= Brown University =

Private university in Providence, Rhode Island, US

- Coat of arms
- Latin: Universitas Brunensis
- Former name: Rhode Island College (1764–1804)
- Motto: In Deo Speramus (Latin)
- Motto in English: "In God We Hope"
- Type: Private research university
- Established: September 15, 1764; 262 years ago
- Accreditation: NECHE
- Academic affiliations: AAU; COFHE; URA; NAICU; space-grant
- Endowment: $9.5 billion (2026)
- Budget: $1.28 billion (2023)
- Chancellor: Brian Moynihan
- President: Christina Paxson
- Provost: Francis J. Doyle III
- Academic staff: 848
- Students: 11,005
- Undergraduates: 7,272
- Postgraduates: 3,130; 602 medical students
- Location: Providence, Rhode Island, United States; 41.826°N 71.403°W
- Campus: 143 acres (58 ha); Midsize city
- Other campuses: Groton; Madrid
- Newspaper: The Brown Daily Herald
- Colors: Seal brown, cardinal red, and white
- Nickname: Bears
- Sporting affiliations: NCAA Division I FCS – Ivy League; ECAC Hockey; EARC; EAWRC; NEISA; CWPA; IRA
- Mascot: Bruno the Bear
- Website: brown.edu

Brown University is a private Ivy League research university in Providence, Rhode Island, United States. The university is the seventh-oldest institution of higher education in the United States, founded in 1764 as the College in the English Colony of Rhode Island and Providence Plantations. One of nine colonial colleges chartered before the American Revolution, it was the first American college to codify that admission and instruction of students was to be equal regardless of the religious affiliation of students.

The university is home to the oldest applied mathematics program in the country and oldest engineering program in the Ivy League. (Note: The school's founding was preceded by that of Harvard Medical School and Dartmouth Medical School. While Yale chartered a medical school in 1810, instruction did not begin for another three years.) It was one of the early doctoral-granting institutions in the U.S., adding masters and doctoral studies in 1887. In 1969, it adopted its Open Curriculum after student lobbying, which eliminated mandatory general education distribution requirements. In 1971, Brown's coordinate women's institution, Pembroke College, was fully merged into the university.

The university comprises the College, the Graduate School, Alpert Medical School, the School of Engineering, the School of Public Health and the School of Professional Studies. Its international programs are organized through the Watson School of International and Public Affairs, and it is academically affiliated with the Marine Biological Laboratory and the Rhode Island School of Design, which offers undergraduate and graduate dual degree programs. The university is surrounded by a federally listed architectural district with a concentration of colonial-era buildings. Benefit Street has one of America's richest concentrations of 18th- and 19th-century architecture. Undergraduate admissions are among the most selective in the country, with an acceptance rate of 5% for the class of 2026.

As of October 2025, 12 Nobel Prize laureates, 1 Fields Medalist, 1 Dan David Prize winner, 7 National Humanities Medalists, (Note: Vartan Gregorian (1998), Edmund Morgan (2000), Donald Kagan (2002), Marilynne Robinson (2012), Gordon S. Wood (2010), Krista Tippett (2014), Natalie Zemon Davis (2012)) and 11 National Medal of Science laureates have been affiliated with Brown as alumni, faculty, or researchers. Alumni also include 29 Pulitzer Prize winners, (Note: George W. Potter, Martin Bernheimer, Kirk Scharfenberg, Alfred Uhry, Tony Horwitz, Joan D. Hedrick, David S. Rohde, Steven Millhauser, Nilo Cruz, Jeffrey Eugenides, Marilynne Robinson, Gareth Cook, James Risen, Usha Lee McFarling, Lynn Nottage, Quiara Alegría Hudes, Ayad Akhtar, David Kertzer, Alissa J. Rubin, Peter Balakian, Kathryn Schulz, Lynn Nottage, Andrew Sean Greer, James Forman Jr., Jackie Sibblies Drury, Benjamin Moser, Marcia Chatelain, Salamishah Tillet, Percival Everett.) 21 billionaires, (Note: John D. Rockefeller Jr. (1897), Sidney Frank (Class of 1942), Ted Turner (Class of 1960), Wilbur Edwin "Ed" Bosarge (1969), Orlando Bravo (1970), Jonathan M. Nelson (1977), Paul Kazarian (1980), Barry Sternlicht (1982), Glenn Creamer (1984), Aneel Bhusri (1988), Chung Yong-jin (1994), Cho Hyun-Sang (1994), Carl Ferdinand Oetker (1996), Andres Santo Domingo (2000), İpek Kıraç (2007), Evan Wallace (2012), Akash Ambani (2013), Devin Finzer (2013), Dylan Field (Class of 2013½), Roberta Anamaria Civita) 4 U.S. secretaries of state, over 100 members of the United States Congress, 58 Rhodes Scholars, 22 MacArthur Genius Fellows, (Note: Richard Benson, Joanna Scott (1985), Richard Foreman (1959), John C. Bonifaz (1989), Lucy Blake (1981), Michael H. Dickinson (1984), Jim Yong Kim (1982), Nawal M. Nour (1984), Sarah Ruhl (1997, 2001), Jennifer Richeson (1994), Lynn Nottage (1986), Edwidge Danticat (1993), Kelly Benoit-Bird (1998), Sebastian Ruth (1997), William Seeley (1993), Donald Antrim (1981), David Lobell (2000), Ben Lerner (2001, 2003), Lauren Redniss (1996), Greg Asbed (1985), Monica Muñoz Martinez (2006), Rina Foygel Barber (2005)) and 38 Olympic medalists.

== History ==
=== Foundation and charter ===
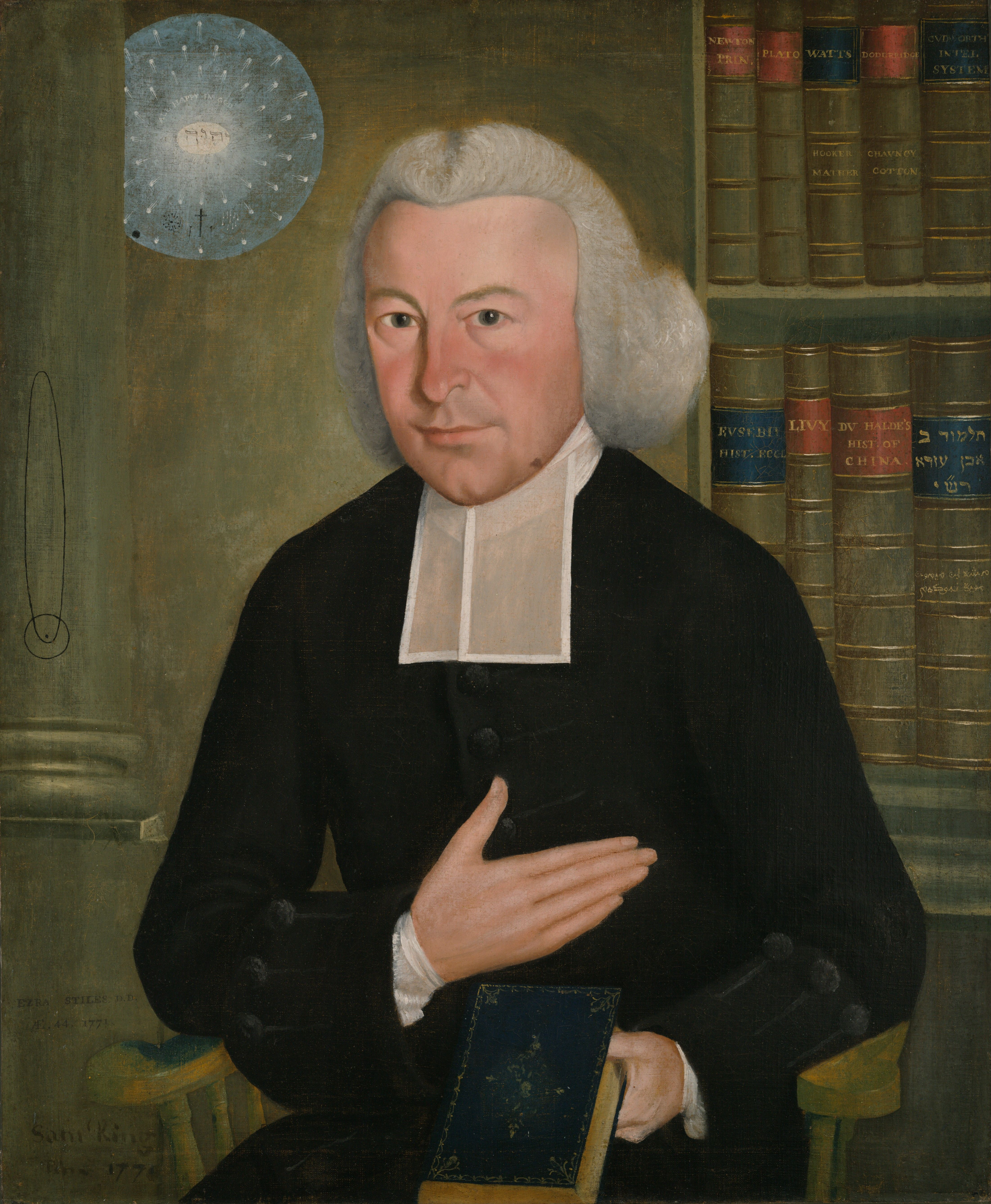
Petitioner Ezra Stiles later became the seventh president of Yale College.

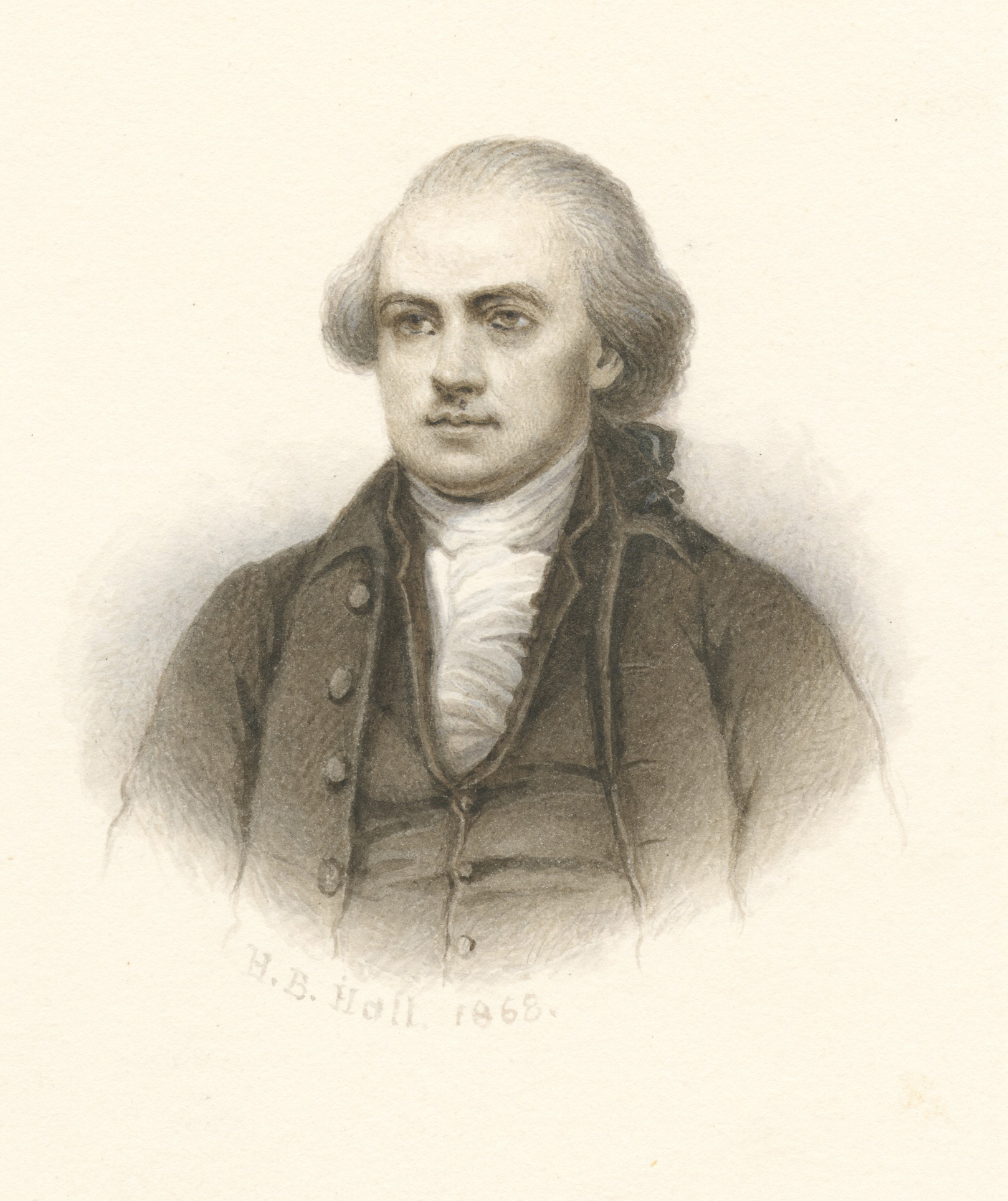
Petitioner William Ellery signed the United States Declaration of Independence in 1776.

In 1761, three residents of Newport, Rhode Island, drafted a petition to the colony's General Assembly:

That your Petitioners propose to open a literary institution or School for instructing young Gentlemen in the Languages, Mathematics, Geography & History, & such other branches of Knowledge as shall be desired. That for this End ... it will be necessary ... to erect a public Building or Buildings for the boarding of the youth & the Residence of the Professors.

The three petitioners were Ezra Stiles, pastor of Newport's Second Congregational Church and future president of Yale University; William Ellery Jr., future signer of the United States Declaration of Independence; and Josias Lyndon, future governor of the colony. Stiles and Ellery later served as co-authors of the college's charter two years later. The editor of Stiles's papers observes, "This draft of a petition connects itself with other evidence of Dr. Stiles's project for a Collegiate Institution in Rhode Island, before the charter of what became Brown University."

The Philadelphia Baptist Association was also interested in establishing a college in Rhode Island, which was founded as a Baptist colony in America, including the mother-church of all American Baptists: the First Baptist Church in America. At the time, the Baptists were unrepresented among the colonial colleges; the Congregationalists had Harvard University and Yale University, the Presbyterians had the College of New Jersey, which later became Princeton University, and the Episcopalians had the College of William & Mary and King's College, which later became Columbia University. The local University of Pennsylvania in their native Philadelphia was founded by Benjamin Franklin without direct association with any particular denomination. Isaac Backus, the Baptist minister and historian of the New England Baptists, who was an inaugural trustee of Brown University, wrote of the October 1762 resolution taken at Philadelphia:

The Philadelphia Association obtained such an acquaintance with our affairs, as to bring them to an apprehension that it was practicable and expedient to erect a college in the Colony of Rhode-Island, under the chief direction of the Baptists; ... Mr. James Manning, who took his first degree in New-Jersey college in September, 1762, was esteemed a suitable leader in this important work.

James Manning arrived at Newport in July 1763 and was introduced to Stiles, who agreed to write the charter for the college. Stiles' first draft was read to the General Assembly in August 1763, and rejected by Baptist members who worried that their denomination would be underrepresented in the College Board of Fellows. A revised charter written by Stiles and Ellery was adopted by the Rhode Island General Assembly on March 3, 1764, in East Greenwich.

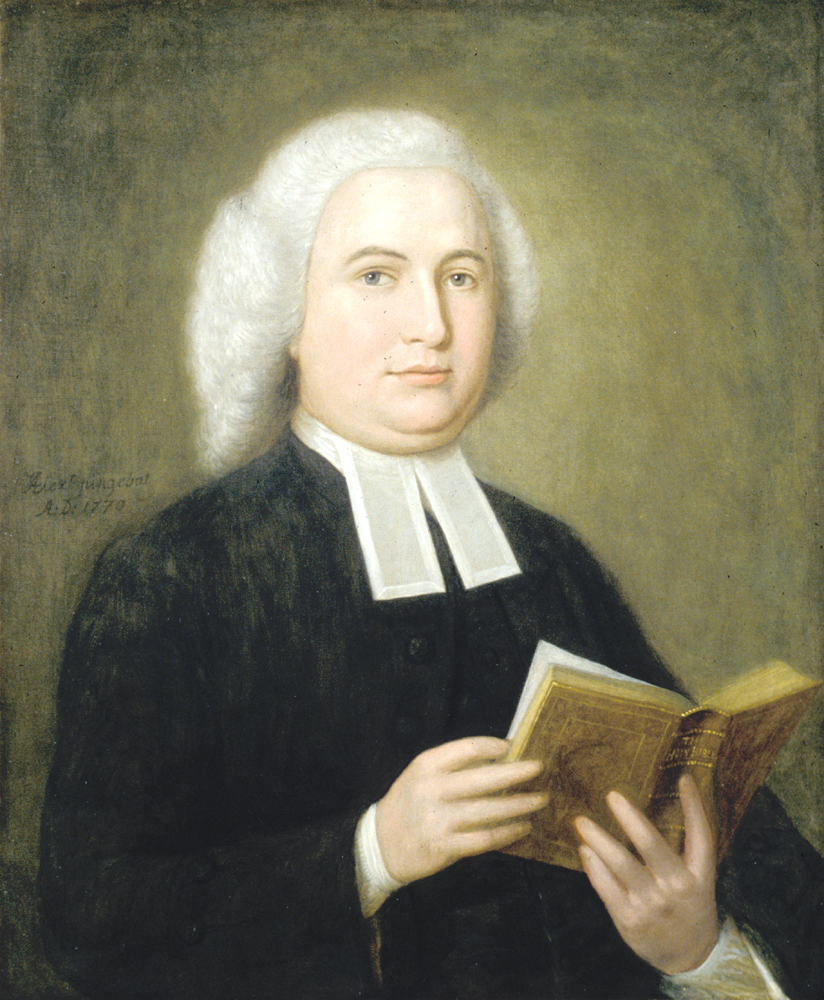
Brown's first president, minister James Manning

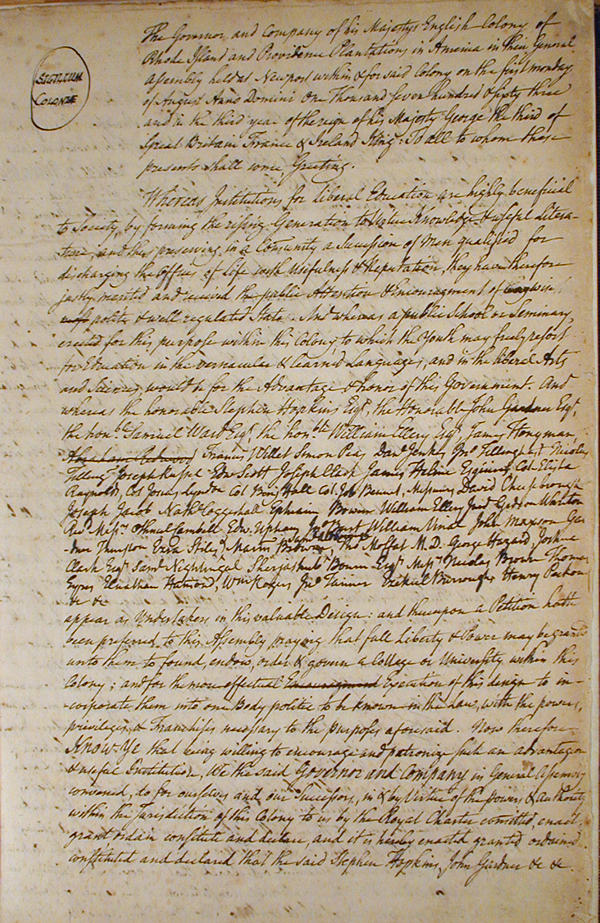
The Ezra Stiles copy of Brown's 1764 charter

In September 1764, the inaugural meeting of the corporation—the college's governing body—was held in Newport's Old Colony House. Governor Stephen Hopkins was chosen chancellor, former and future governor Samuel Ward vice chancellor, John Tillinghast treasurer, and Thomas Eyres secretary. The charter stipulated that the board of trustees should be composed of 22 Baptists, 5 Quakers, 5 Episcopalians, and 4 Congregationalists. Of the 12 Fellows, 8 should be Baptists—including the college president—"and the rest indifferently of any or all Denominations."

At the time of its creation, Brown's charter was a uniquely progressive document. Other colleges had curricular strictures against opposing doctrines, while Brown's charter asserted, "Sectarian differences of opinions, shall not make any Part of the Public and Classical Instruction." The document additionally "recognized more broadly and fundamentally than any other [university charter] the principle of denominational cooperation." The oft-repeated statement that Brown's charter alone prohibited a religious test for College membership is inaccurate; other college charters were similarly liberal in that particular.

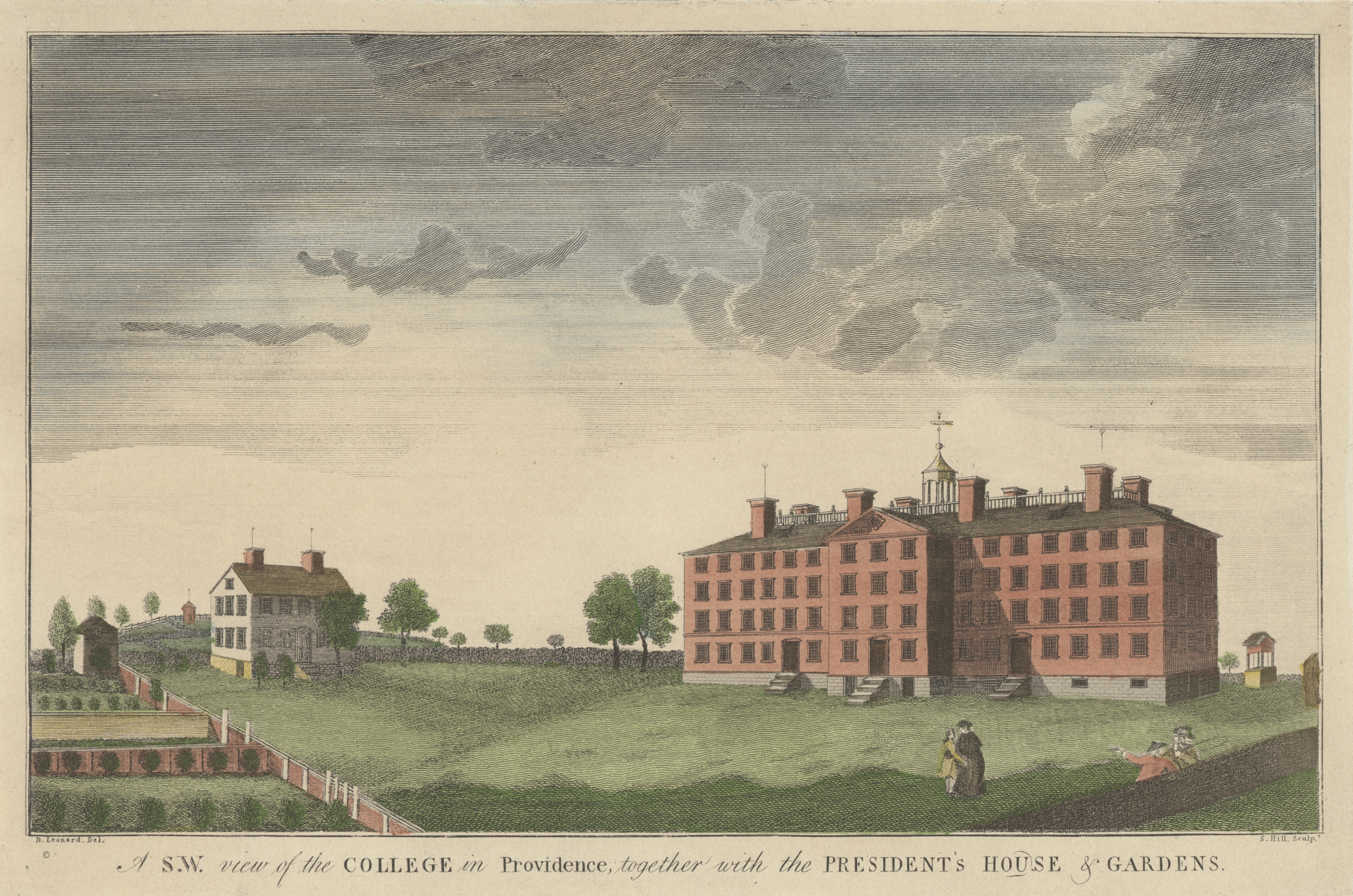
This 1792 engraving is the first published image of Brown. University Hall stands on the right while the President's House sits on the left.

The college was founded as Rhode Island College, at the site of the First Baptist Church in Warren, Rhode Island. Manning was sworn in as the college's first president in 1765 and remained in the role until 1791. In 1766, the college authorized Morgan Edwards to travel to Europe to "solicit Benefactions for this Institution". During his year-and-a-half stay in the British Isles, Edwards secured funding from benefactors including Thomas Penn and Benjamin Franklin.

In 1770, the college moved from Warren to Providence. To establish a campus, John and Moses Brown purchased a four-acre lot on the crest of College Hill on behalf of the school. The majority of the property fell within the bounds of the original home lot of Chad Brown, an ancestor of the Browns and one of the original proprietors of Providence Plantations. After the college was relocated to the city, work began on constructing its first building.

A building committee, organized by the corporation, developed plans for the college's first purpose-built edifice, finalizing a design on February 9, 1770. The subsequent structure, referred to as "The College Edifice" and later as University Hall, may have been modeled on Nassau Hall, built 14 years prior at the College of New Jersey. President Manning, an active member of the building process, was educated at Princeton and might have suggested that Brown's first building resemble that of his alma mater.

==== Brown family ====
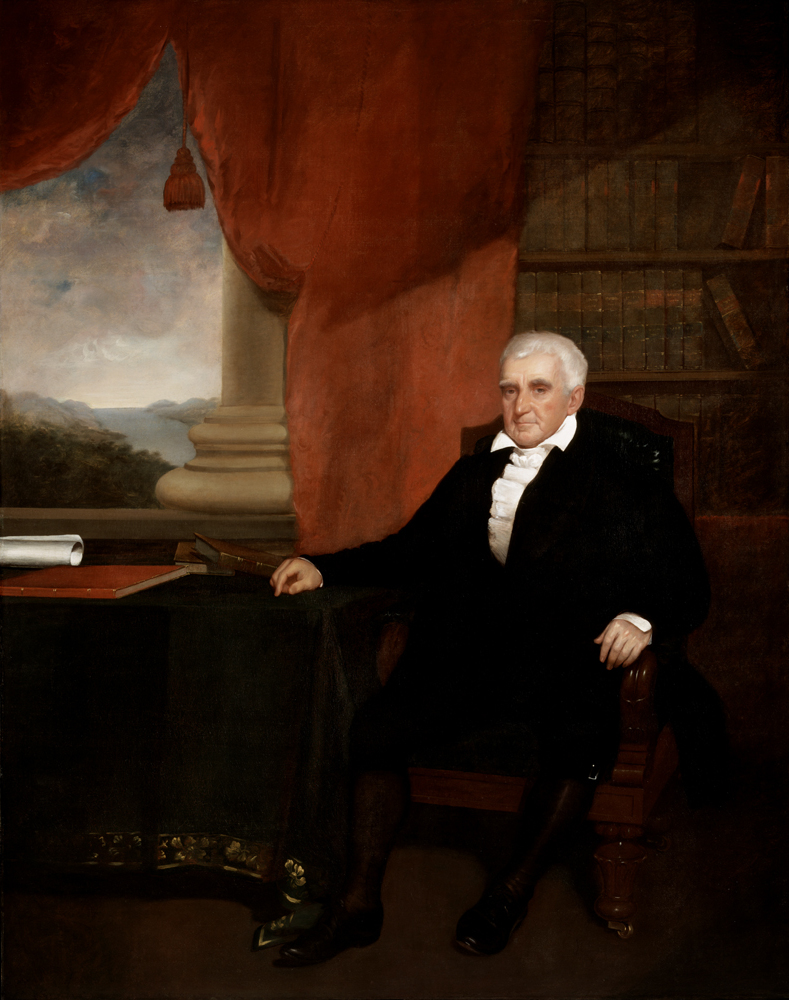
Following the gift of Nicholas Brown Jr. (Class of 1786), the university was renamed in his honor.

Nicholas Brown, John Brown, Joseph Brown, and Moses Brown were instrumental in moving the college to Providence, constructing its first building, and securing its endowment. Joseph became a professor of natural philosophy at the college; John served as its treasurer from 1775 to 1796; and Nicholas Sr's son Nicholas Brown Jr. succeeded his uncle as treasurer from 1796 to 1825.

On September 8, 1803, the corporation voted, "That the donation of $5,000, if made to this College within one Year from the late Commencement, shall entitle the donor to name the College." The following year, the appeal was answered by College Treasurer Nicholas Brown Jr. In a letter dated September 6, 1804, Brown committed "a donation of Five Thousand Dollars to Rhode Island College, to remain in perpetuity as a fund for the establishment of a Professorship of Oratory and Belles Lettres." In recognition of the gift, the corporation on the same day voted, "That this College be called and known in all future time by the Name of Brown University." Over the years, the benefactions of Nicholas Brown Jr., totaled nearly $160,000 and included funds for building Hope College (1821–22) and Manning Hall (1834–35).

In 1904, the John Carter Brown Library was established as an independently funded research library on Brown's campus; the library's collection was founded on that of John Carter Brown, son of Nicholas Brown Jr.

The Brown family was involved in various business ventures in Rhode Island, and accrued wealth both directly and indirectly from the transatlantic slave trade. The family was divided on the issue of slavery. John Brown had defended slavery, while Moses and Nicholas Brown Jr. were fervent abolitionists.

In 2003, under the tenure of President Ruth Simmons, who was the first African-American president of an Ivy League institution, the university established a steering committee to investigate these ties of the university to slavery and recommend a strategy to address them.

==== American Revolution ====
With British vessels patrolling Narragansett Bay in the fall of 1776, the college library was moved out of Providence for safekeeping. During the subsequent American Revolutionary War, Brown's University Hall was used to house French and other revolutionary troops led by General George Washington and the Comte de Rochambeau as they waited to commence the march of 1781 that led to the Siege of Yorktown and the Battle of the Chesapeake. This has been celebrated as marking the defeat of the British and the end of the war. The building functioned as barracks and hospital from December 10, 1776, to April 20, 1780, and as a hospital for French troops from June 26, 1780, to May 27, 1782.

A number of Brown's founders and alumni played roles in the American Revolution and subsequent founding of the United States. Brown's first chancellor, Stephen Hopkins, served as a delegate to the Colonial Congress in Albany in 1754, and to the Continental Congress from 1774 to 1776. James Manning represented Rhode Island at the Congress of the Confederation, while concurrently serving as Brown's first president. Two of Brown's founders, William Ellery and Stephen Hopkins signed the Declaration of Independence.

James Mitchell Varnum, who graduated from Brown with honors in 1769, served as one of General George Washington's Continental Army brigadier generals and later as major general in command of the entire Rhode Island militia. Varnum is noted as the founder and commander of the 1st Rhode Island Regiment, widely regarded as the first Black battalion in U.S. military history. David Howell, who graduated with an A.M. in 1769, served as a delegate to the Continental Congress from 1782 to 1785.

=== Presidents ===
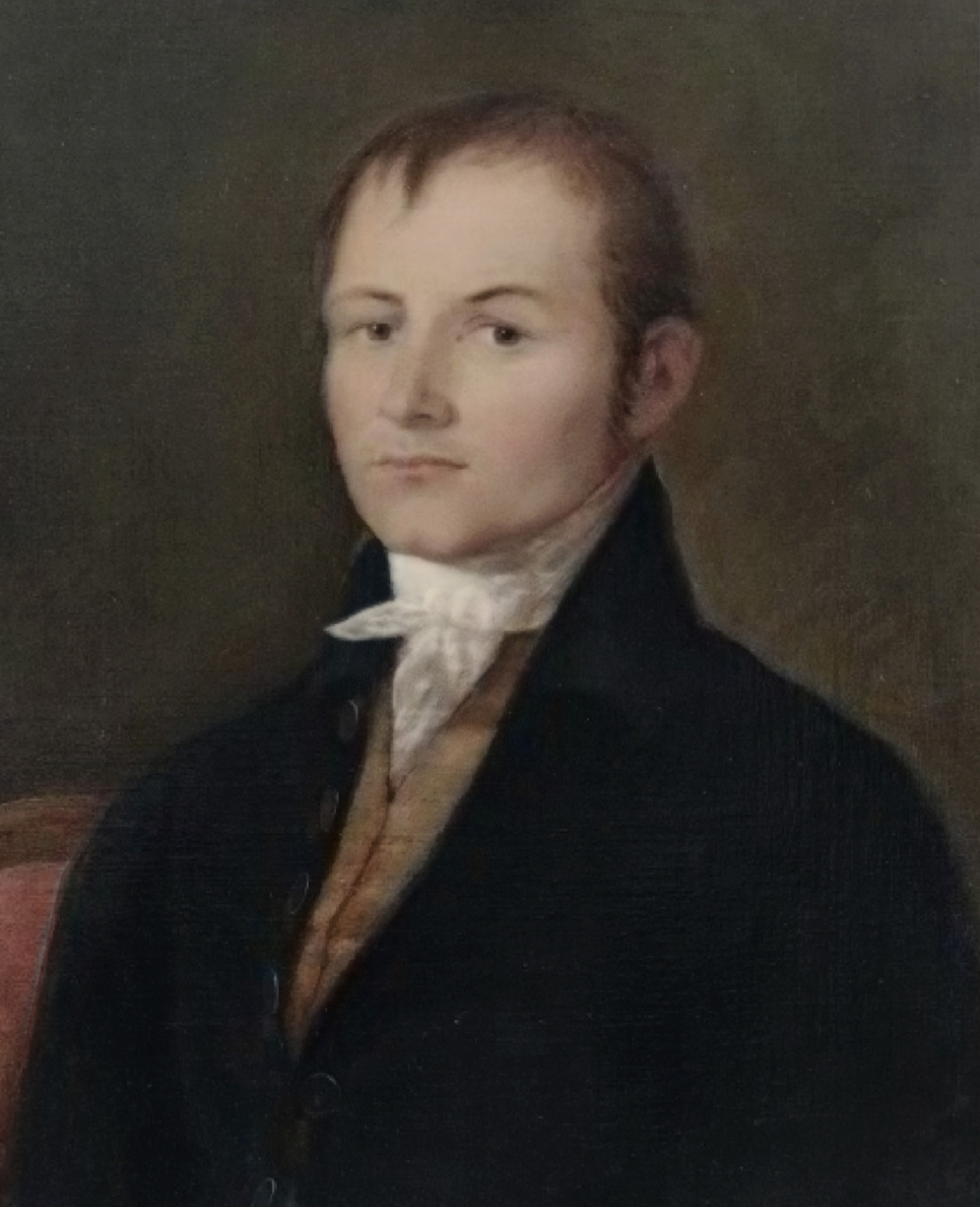
Brown's 2nd president, Jonathan Maxcy, was the first alum to serve as president.

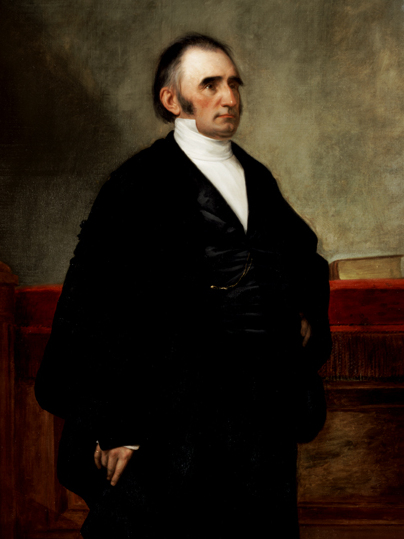
Brown's 4th president, Francis Wayland, urged American universities to adopt a broader curriculum.

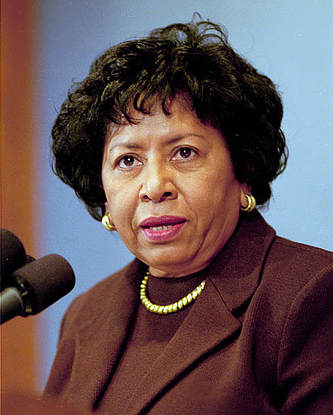
Brown's 18th president, Ruth Simmons, was the Ivy League's first African-American president.

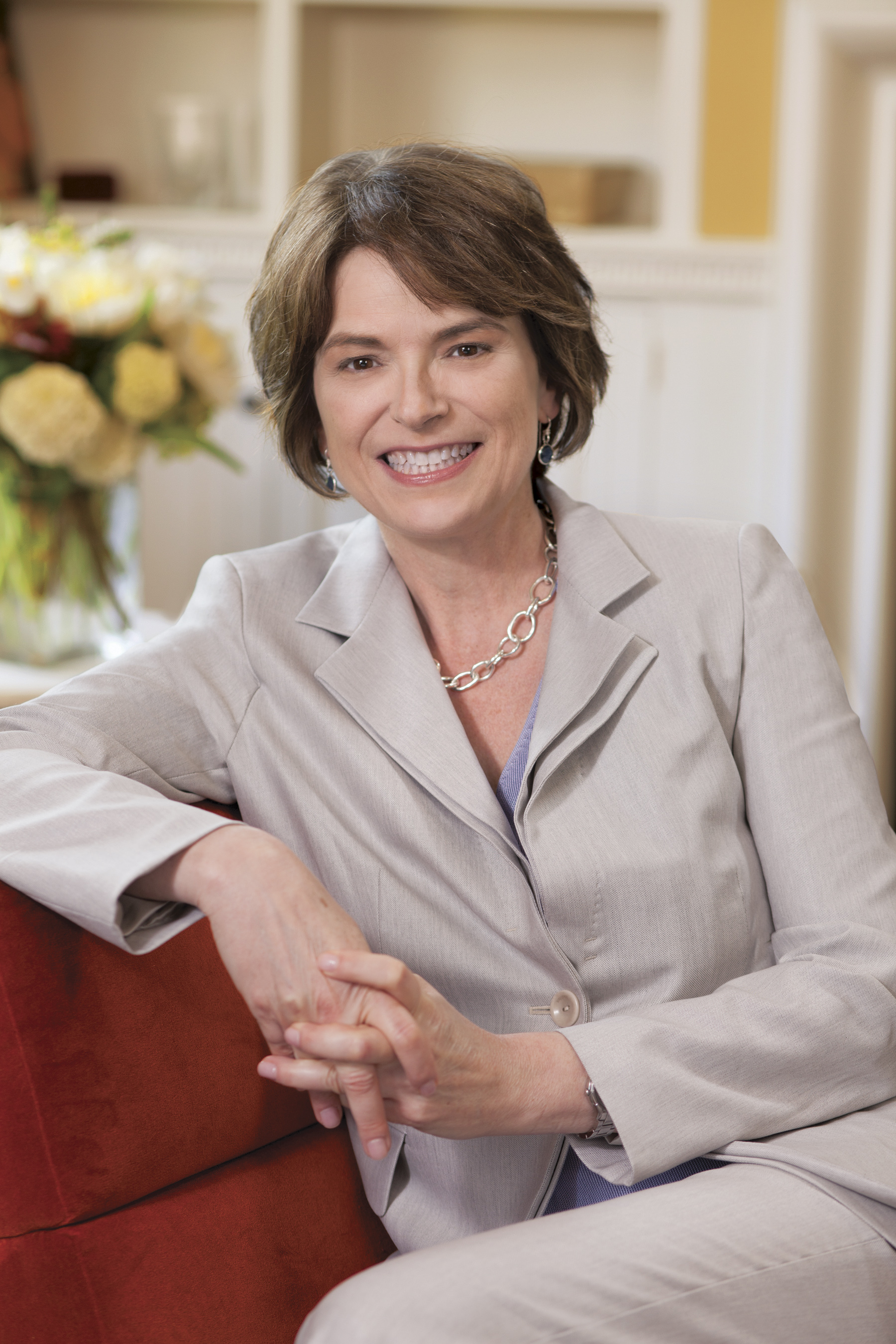
Brown's 19th president, Christina Paxson, has served in the role since 2012.

Nineteen individuals have served as presidents of the university since its founding in 1764. Since 2012, Christina Hull Paxson has served as president. Paxson had previously served as dean of Princeton University's School of Public and International Affairs and chair of Princeton's economics department. Paxson's immediate predecessor, Ruth Simmons, is noted as the first African American president of an Ivy League institution. Other presidents of note include academic, Vartan Gregorian; and philosopher and economist, Francis Wayland.

=== New Curriculum ===
In 1966, the first Group Independent Study Project (GISP) at Brown was formed, involving 80 students and 15 professors. The GISP was inspired by student-initiated experimental schools, especially San Francisco State College, and sought ways to "put students at the center of their education" and "teach students how to think rather than just teaching facts".

Members of the GISP, Ira Magaziner and Elliot Maxwell published a paper of their findings titled, "Draft of a Working Paper for Education at Brown University." The paper made proposals for a new curriculum, including interdisciplinary freshman-year courses that would introduce "modes of thought", with instruction from faculty from different disciplines as well as for an end to letter grades. The following year Magaziner began organizing the student body to press for the reforms, organizing discussions and protests.

In 1968, university president Ray Heffner established a Special Committee on Curricular Philosophy. Composed of administrators, the committee was tasked with developing specific reforms and producing recommendations. A report, produced by the committee, was presented to the faculty, which voted the New Curriculum into existence on May 7, 1969. Its key features included:

- Modes of Thought courses for first-year students
- The introduction of interdisciplinary courses
- The abandonment of "general education" distribution requirements
- The Satisfactory/No Credit (S/NC) grading option
- The ABC/No Credit grading system, which eliminated pluses, minuses, and D's; a grade of "No Credit" (equivalent to F's at other institutions) would not appear on external transcripts.

The Modes of Thought course was discontinued early on, but the other elements remain in place. In 2006, the reintroduction of plus/minus grading was proposed in response to concerns regarding grade inflation. The idea was rejected by the College Curriculum Council after canvassing alumni, faculty, and students, including the original authors of the Magaziner-Maxwell Report.

=== "Slavery and Justice" report ===
In 2003, then-university president Ruth Simmons launched a steering committee to research Brown's eighteenth-century ties to slavery. In October 2006, the committee released a report documenting its findings.

Titled "Slavery and Justice", the document detailed the ways in which the university benefited both directly and indirectly from the transatlantic slave trade and the labor of enslaved people. The report also included seven recommendations for how the university should address this legacy. Brown has since completed a number of these recommendations including the establishment of its Center for the Study of Slavery and Justice, the construction of its Slavery Memorial, and the funding of a $10 million permanent endowment for Providence Public Schools.

The "Slavery and Justice" report marked the first major effort by an American university to address its ties to slavery and prompted other institutions to undertake similar processes.

=== Interaction with the Trump administration ===
On July 30, 2025, Brown struck a deal with the Trump administration to restore federal research grant funding, after the administration froze it due to complaints mainly about antisemitism on the campus in the wake of pro-Palestinian protests. This deal included $50 million to be paid over ten years to state workforce development programs, a vow to exclude transgender women from women's spaces, a commitment to combatting antisemitism, and renewed partnership with Israeli institutions, among other items. This is the third settlement of its kind from a university to the administration, following Columbia University and the University of Pennsylvania.

Following the federal government's offer of compliance with increased restrictions in exchange for preferential treatment in funding decisions, the university's leaders solicited comments from the university community. Once the period for comments concluded, they chose to reject the offer, becoming the second university to do so after Massachusetts Institute of Technology.

== Coat of arms ==
Brown's coat of arms was created in 1834. The prior year, president Francis Wayland had commissioned a committee to update the school's original seal to match the name the university had adopted in 1804. Central in the coat of arms is a white escutcheon divided into four sectors by a red cross. Within each sector of the coat of arms lies an open book. Above the shield is a crest consisting of the upper half of a sun in splendor among the clouds atop a red and white torse.

== Campus ==
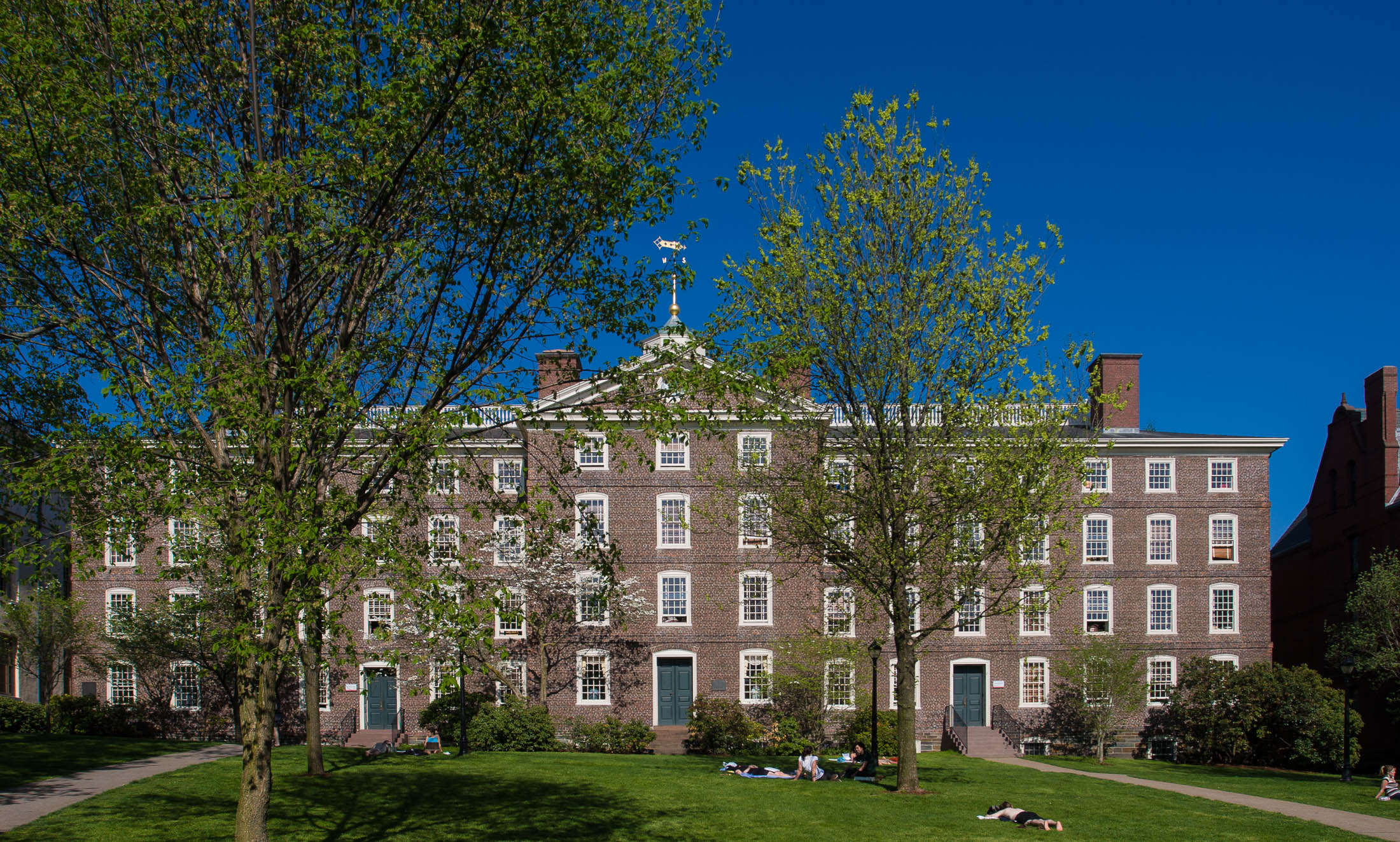
University Hall, Brown's oldest building, was constructed in 1770 and is a National Historic Landmark

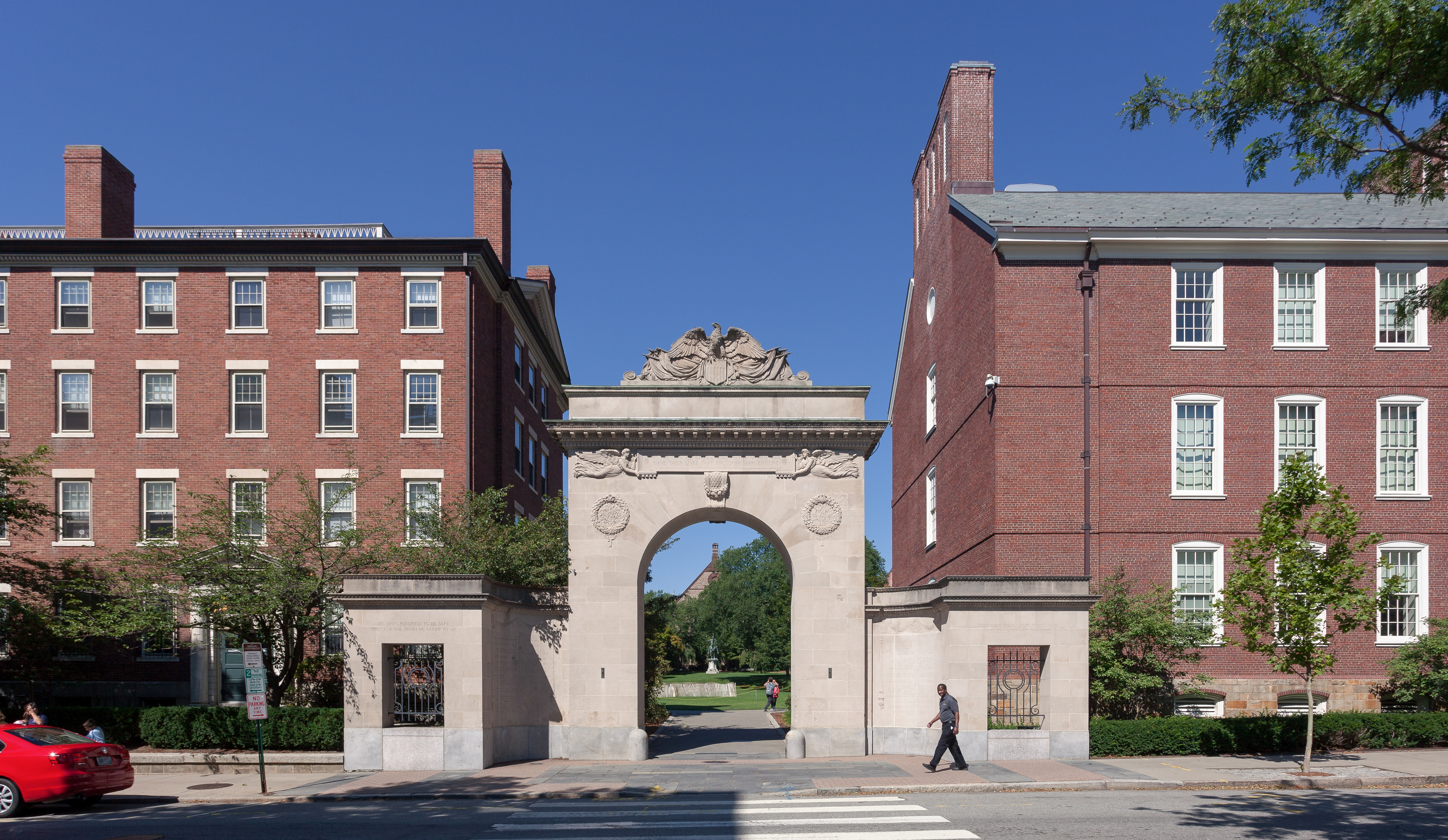
Soldiers Memorial Gate (1921) long marked the eastern edge of Brown's campus.

Brown is the largest institutional landowner in Providence, with properties on College Hill and in the Jewelry District. The university was built contemporaneously with the eighteenth and nineteenth-century precincts surrounding it, making Brown's campus tightly integrated into Providence's urban fabric. Among the noted architects who have shaped Brown's campus are McKim, Mead & White, Philip Johnson, Rafael Viñoly, Diller Scofidio + Renfro, and Robert A. M. Stern.

=== Main campus ===
Brown's main campus, comprises 235 buildings and 143 acres (58 ha) in the East Side neighborhood of College Hill. The university's central campus sits on a 15-acre (6.1 ha) block bounded by Waterman, Prospect, George, and Thayer Streets; newer buildings extend northward, eastward, and southward. Brown's core, historic campus, constructed primarily between 1770 and 1926, is defined by three greens: the Front or Quiet Green, the Main or College Green, and the Ruth J. Simmons Quadrangle (historically known as Lincoln Field). A brick and wrought-iron fence punctuated by decorative gates and arches traces the block's perimeter. This section of campus is primarily Georgian and Richardsonian Romanesque in its architectural character.

To the south of the central campus are academic buildings and residential quadrangles, including Wriston, Keeney, and Gregorian quadrangles. Immediately to the east of the campus core sit Sciences Park and Brown's School of Engineering. North of the central campus are performing and visual arts facilities, life sciences labs, and the Pembroke Campus, which houses both dormitories and academic buildings. Facing the western edge of the central campus sit two of the Brown's seven libraries, the John Hay Library and the John D. Rockefeller Jr. Library.

The university's campus is contiguous with that of the Rhode Island School of Design, which is located immediately to Brown's west, along the slope of College Hill.

==== Van Wickle Gates ====
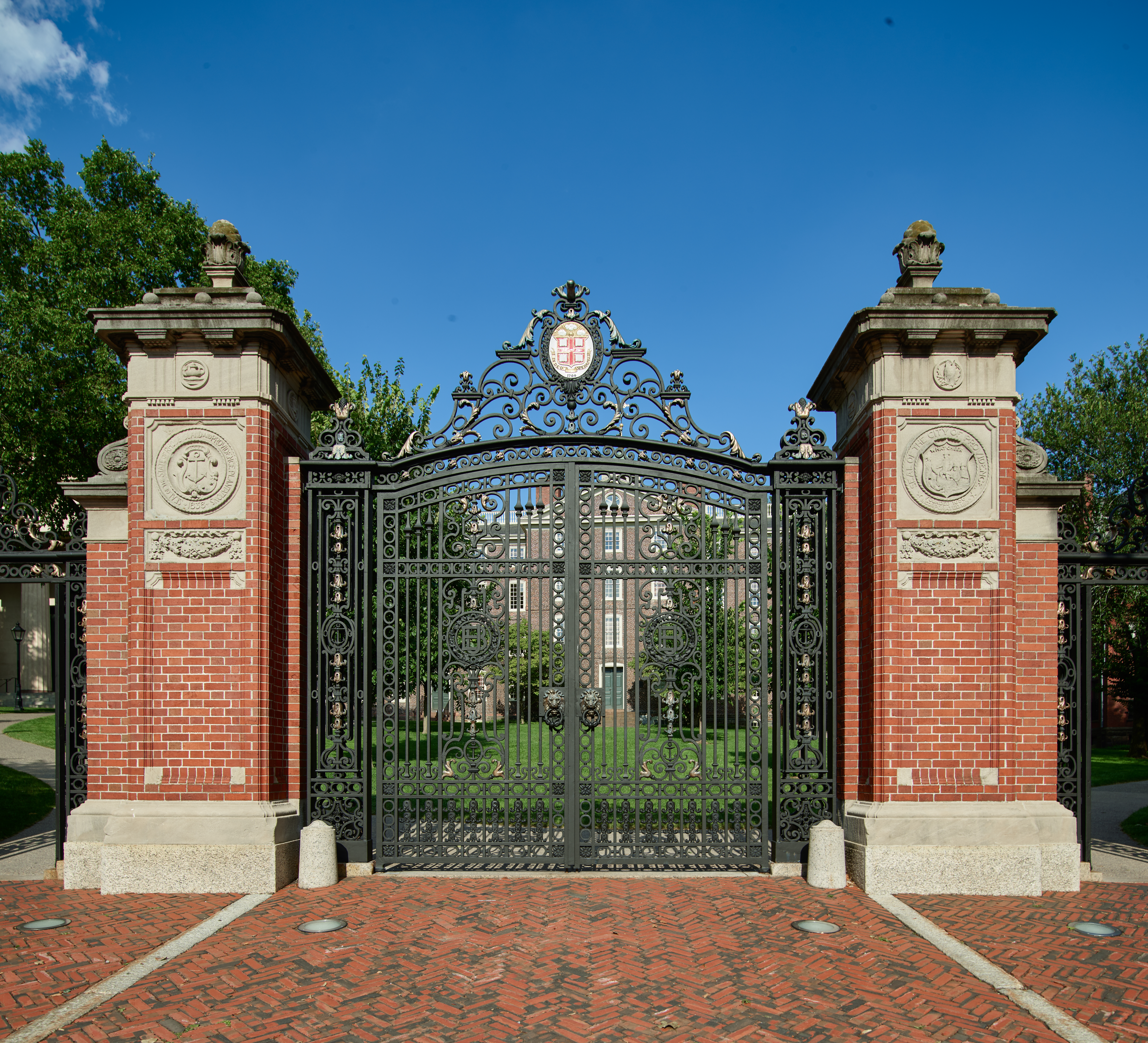
The Van Wickle Gates stand at the crest of College Hill

Built in 1901, the Van Wickle Gates are a set of wrought iron gates that stand at the western edge of Brown's campus. The larger main gate is flanked by two smaller side gates. At Convocation the central gate opens inward to admit the procession of new students; at Commencement, the gate opens outward for the procession of graduates. A Brown superstition holds that students who walk through the central gate a second time prematurely will not graduate, although walking backward is said to cancel the hex.

=== John Hay Library ===
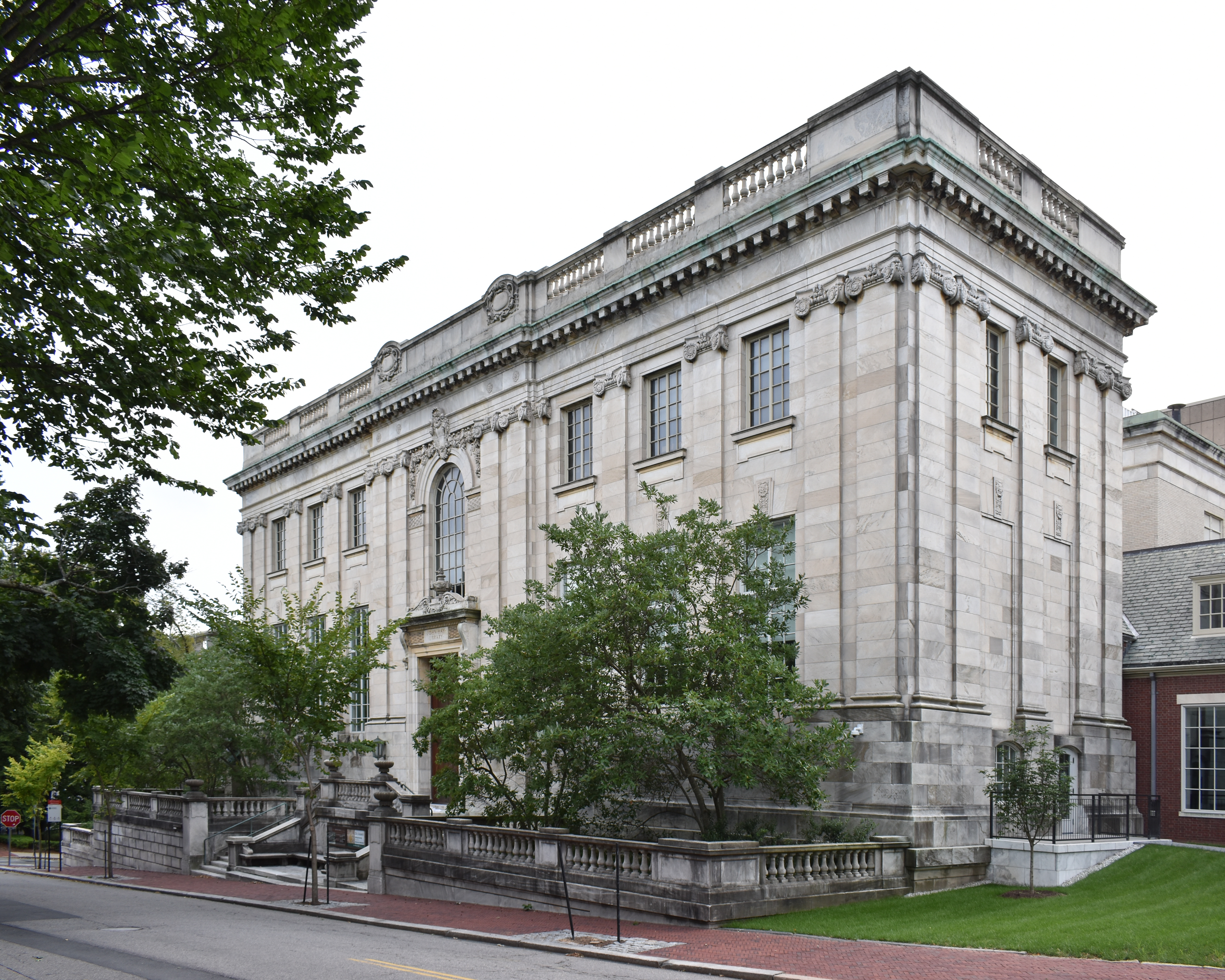
The John Hay Library is home to rare books, special collections, and the university archives.

The John Hay Library is the second oldest library on campus. Opened in 1910, the library is named for John Hay (class of 1858), private secretary to Abraham Lincoln and Secretary of State under William McKinley and Theodore Roosevelt. The construction of the building was funded in large part by Hay's friend, Andrew Carnegie, who contributed half of the $300,000 cost of construction.

The John Hay Library serves as the repository of the university's archives, rare books and manuscripts, and special collections. Noteworthy among the latter are the Anne S. K. Brown Military Collection (described as "the foremost American collection of material devoted to the history and iconography of soldiers and soldiering"), the Harris Collection of American Poetry and Plays (described as "the largest and most comprehensive collection of its kind in any research library"), the Lownes Collection of the History of Science (described as "one of the three most important private collections of books of science in America"), and the papers of H. P. Lovecraft. The Hay Library is home to one of the broadest collections of incunabula in the Americas, one of Brown's two Shakespeare First Folios, the manuscript of George Orwell's Nineteen Eighty-Four, and three books bound in human skin.

=== John Carter Brown Library ===
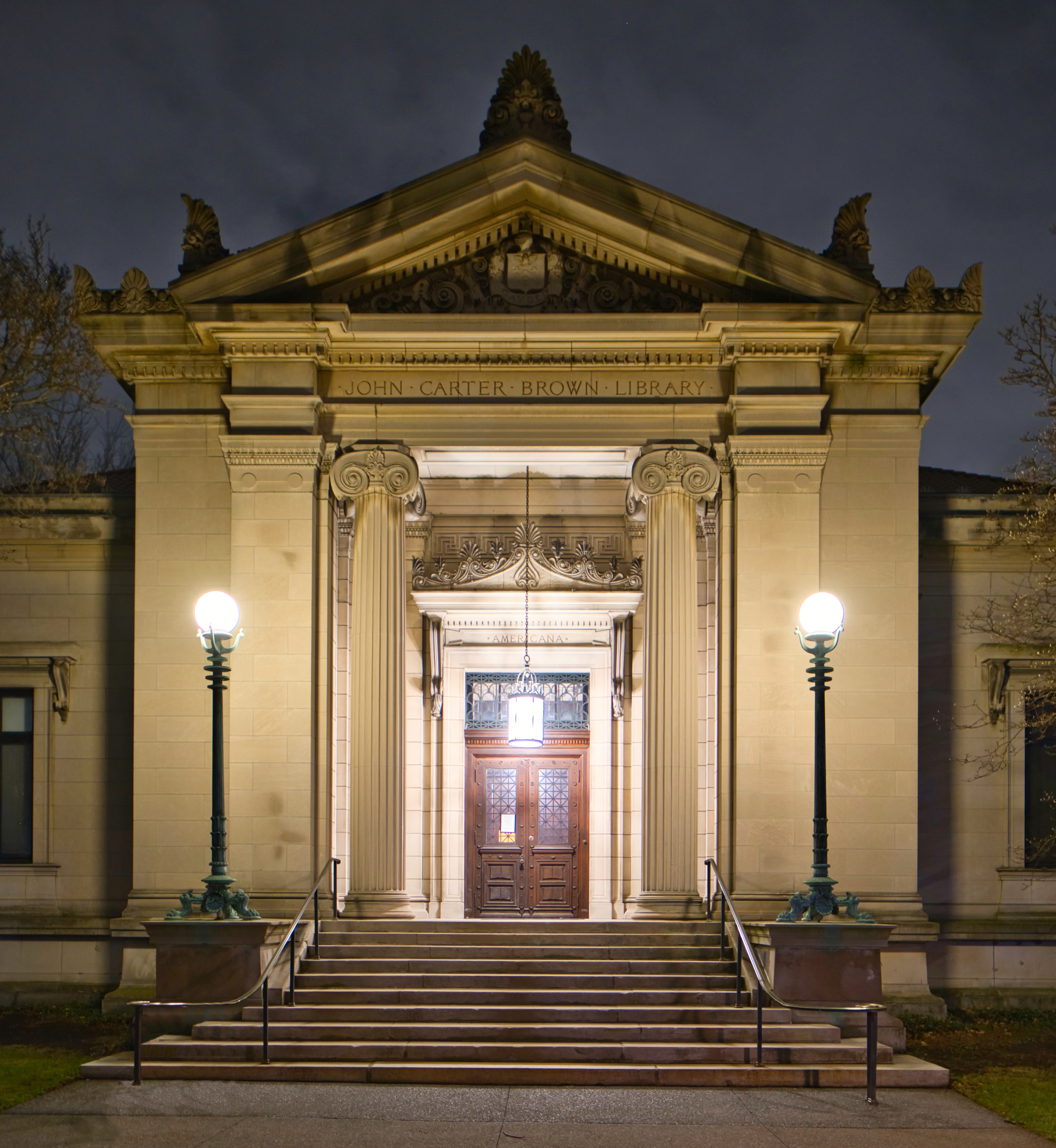
The John Carter Brown Library is one of the world's leading repositories of books, maps, and manuscripts relating to the colonial Americas.

Founded in 1846, the John Carter Brown Library is generally regarded as the world's leading collection of primary historical sources relating to the exploration and colonization of the Americas. While administered and funded separately from the university, the library has been owned by Brown and located on its campus since 1904.

The library contains the best preserved of the eleven surviving copies of the Bay Psalm Book—the earliest extant book printed in British North America and the most expensive printed book in the world. Other holdings include a Shakespeare First Folio and the world's largest collection of 16th-century Mexican texts.

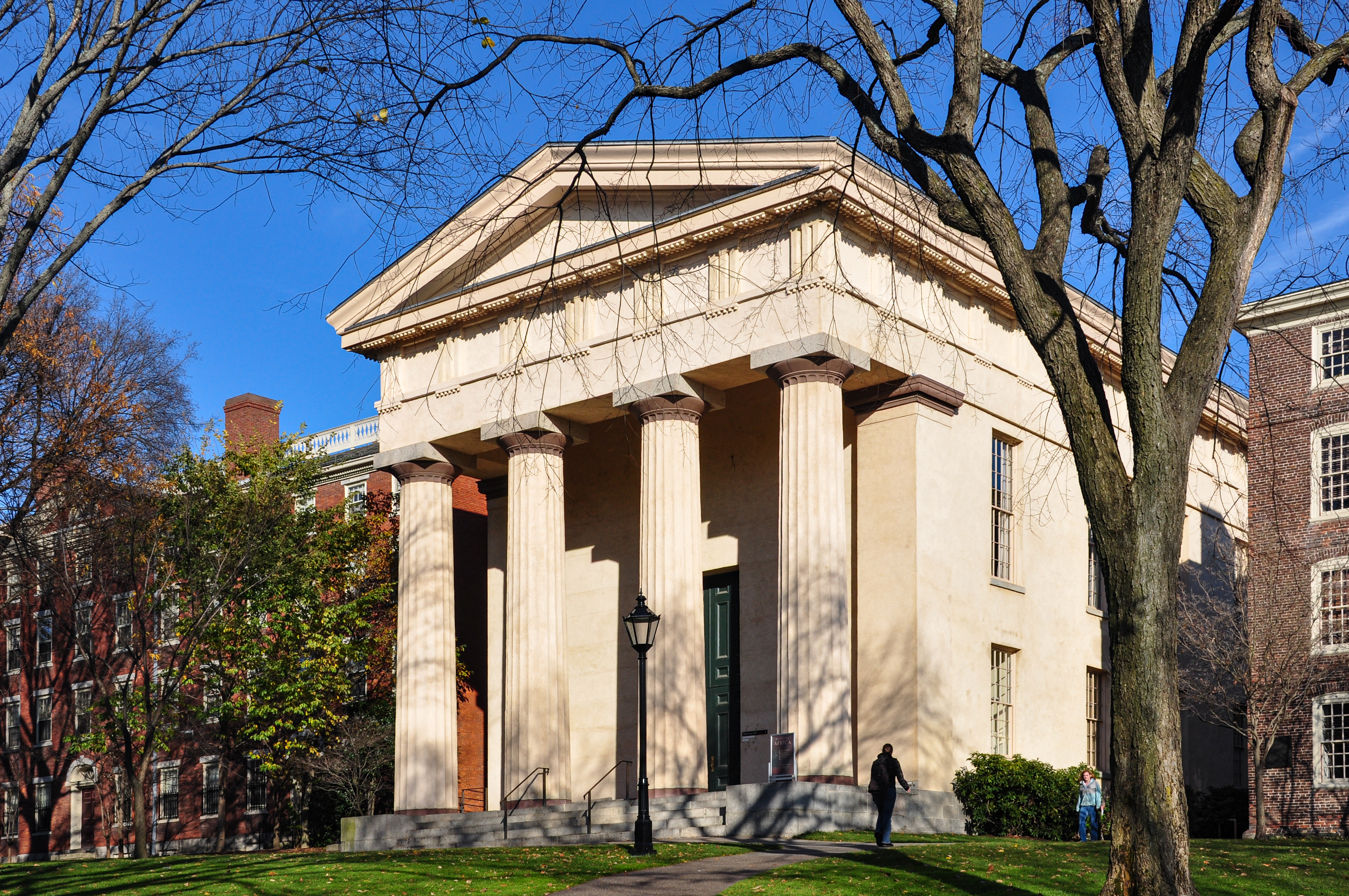
The galleries of Brown's anthropology museum, the Haffenreffer, are located in Manning Hall.

=== Haffenreffer Museum ===
The exhibition galleries of the Haffenreffer Museum of Anthropology, Brown's teaching museum, are located in Manning Hall on the campus's main green. Its one million artifacts, available for research and educational purposes, are located at its Collections Research Center in Bristol, Rhode Island. The museum's goal is to inspire creative and critical thinking about culture by fostering an interdisciplinary understanding of the material world. It provides opportunities for faculty and students to work with collections and the public, teaching through objects and programs in classrooms and exhibitions. The museum sponsors lectures and events in all areas of anthropology and also runs an extensive program of outreach to local schools.

=== Annmary Brown Memorial ===
The Annmary Brown Memorial was constructed from 1903 to 1907 by the politician, Civil War veteran, and book collector General Rush Hawkins, as a mausoleum for his wife, Annmary Brown, a member of the Brown family. In addition to its crypt—the final repository for Brown and Hawkins—the Memorial includes works of art from Hawkins's private collection, including paintings by Angelica Kauffman, Peter Paul Rubens, Gilbert Stuart, Giovanni Battista Tiepolo, Benjamin West, and Eastman Johnson, among others. His collection of over 450 incunabula was relocated to the John Hay Library in 1990. Today the Memorial is home to Brown's Medieval Studies and Renaissance Studies programs.

=== The Walk ===
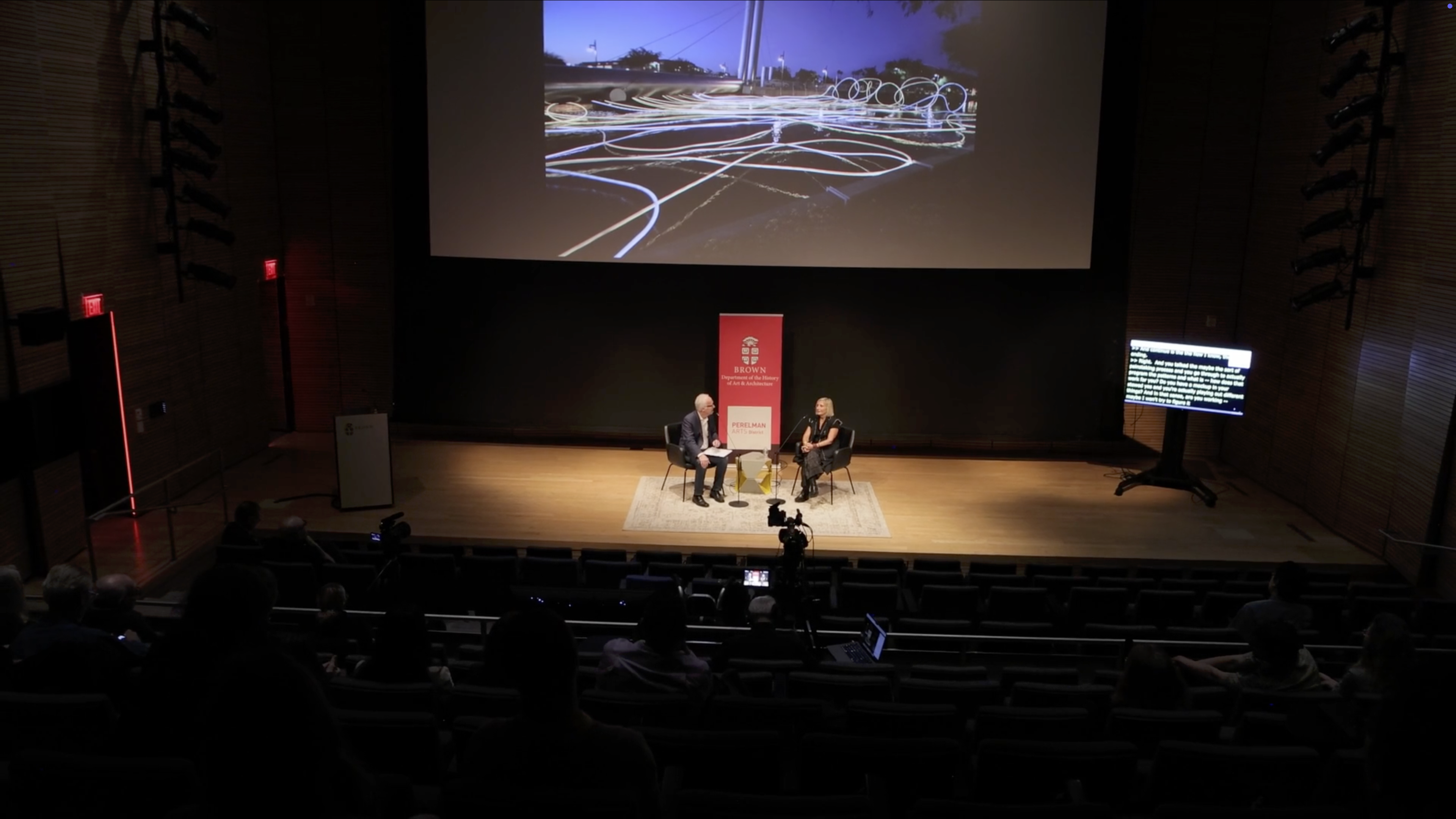
Inside the auditorium of the Granoff Center for the Creative Arts, with Dietrich C. Neumann and Grimanesa Amorós on stage.

The Walk, a landscaped pedestrian corridor, connects the Pembroke Campus to the main campus. It runs parallel to Thayer Street and serves as a primary axis of campus, extending from Ruth Simmons Quadrangle at its southern terminus to the Meeting Street entrance to the Pembroke Campus at its northern end. The walk is bordered by departmental buildings as well as the Lindemann Performing Arts Center and Granoff Center for the Creative Arts.

The corridor is home to public art including sculptures by Maya Lin and Tom Friedman.

=== Pembroke campus ===
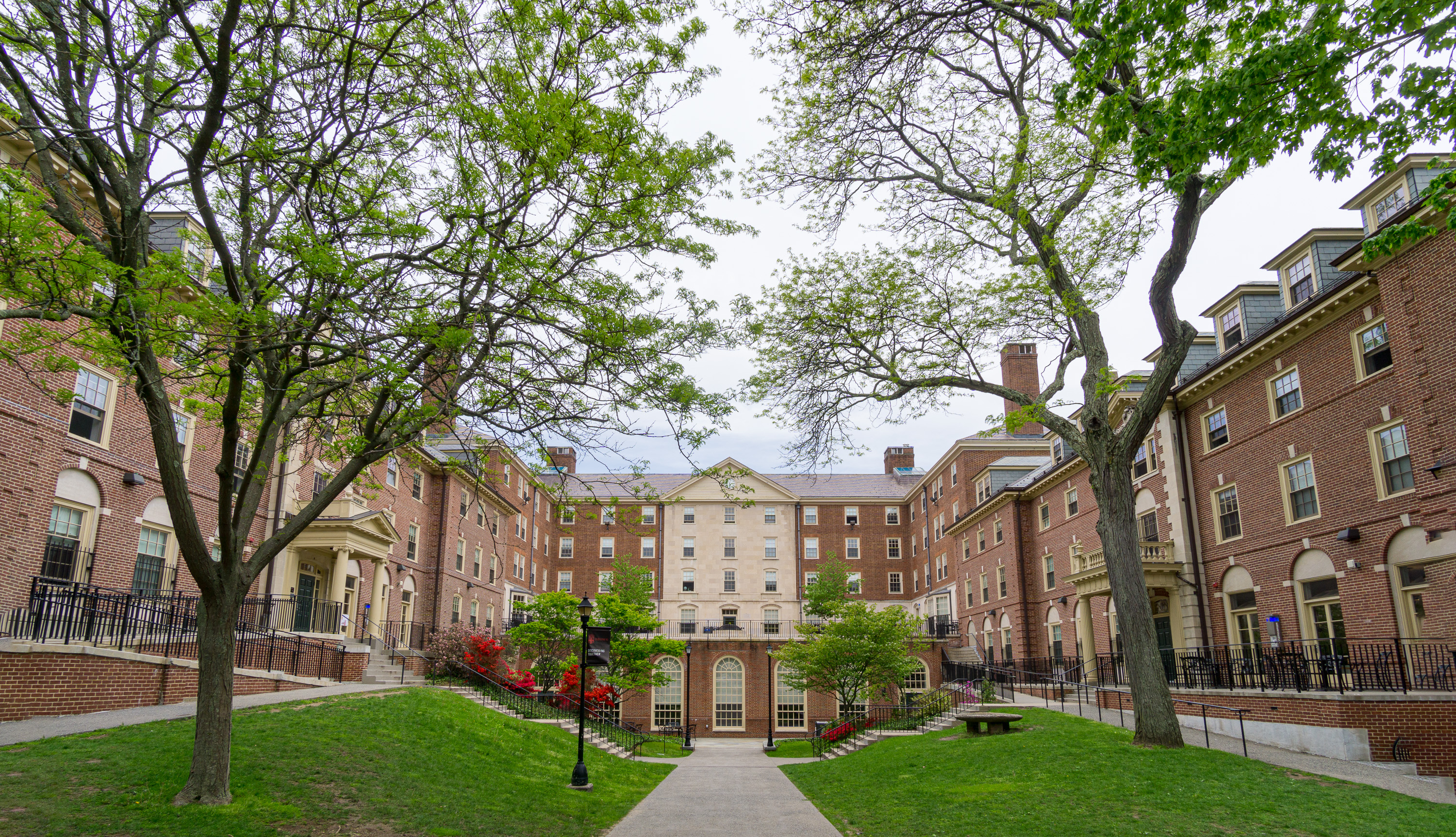
Three dormitories, Metcalf Hall (1919), Andrews Hall (1947), and Miller Hall (1910), formed the heart of Pembroke College and now serve as freshman residences.

The Women's College in Brown University, known as Pembroke College, was founded in October 1891. Upon its 1971 merger with the College of Brown University, Pembroke's campus was absorbed into the larger Brown campus. The Pembroke campus is bordered by Meeting, Brown, Bowen, and Thayer Streets and sits three blocks north of Brown's central campus. The campus is dominated by brick architecture, largely of the Georgian and Victorian styles. The west side of the quadrangle comprises Pembroke Hall (1897), Smith-Buonanno Hall (1907), and Metcalf Hall (1919), while the east side comprises Alumnae Hall (1927) and Miller Hall (1910). The quadrangle culminates on the north with Andrews Hall (1947).

East Campus, centered on Hope and Charlesfield streets, originally served as the campus of Bryant University. In 1969, as Bryant was preparing to relocate to Smithfield, Rhode Island, Brown purchased their Providence campus for $5 million. The transaction expanded the Brown campus by 10 acres (40,000 m^{2}) and 26 buildings. In 1971, Brown renamed the area East Campus. Today, the area is largely used for dormitories.

Thayer Street runs through Brown's main campus. As a commercial corridor frequented by students, Thayer is comparable to Harvard Square or Berkeley's Telegraph Avenue. Wickenden Street, in the adjacent Fox Point neighborhood, is another commercial street similarly popular among students.

Built in 1925, Brown Stadium—the home of the school's football team—is located approximately a mile and a half northeast of the university's central campus. Marston Boathouse, the home of Brown's crew teams, lies on the Seekonk River, to the southeast of campus. Brown's sailing teams are based out of the Ted Turner Sailing Pavilion at the Edgewood Yacht Club in adjacent Cranston.

Since 2011, Brown's Warren Alpert Medical School has been located in Providence's historic Jewelry District, near the medical campus of Brown's teaching hospitals, Rhode Island Hospital and the Women and Infants Hospital of Rhode Island. Other university facilities, including molecular medicine labs and administrative offices, are likewise located in the area.

Brown's School of Public Health occupies a landmark modernist building along the Providence River. Other Brown properties include the 376-acre (1.52 km^{2}) Mount Hope Grant in Bristol, Rhode Island, an important Native American site noted as a location of King Philip's War. Brown's Haffenreffer Museum of Anthropology Collection Research Center, particularly strong in Native American items, is located in the Mount Hope Grant.

=== Sustainability ===
Brown has committed to "minimize its energy use, reduce negative environmental impacts, and promote environmental stewardship." Since 2010, the university has required all new buildings meet LEED silver standards. Between 2007 and 2018, Brown reduced its greenhouse gas emissions by 27 percent; the majority of this reduction is attributable to the university's Thermal Efficiency Project which converted its central heating plant from a steam-powered system to a hot water-powered system.

In 2020, Brown announced it had sold 90 percent of its fossil fuel investments as part of a broader divestment from direct investments and managed funds that focus on fossil fuels. In 2021, the university adopted the goal of reducing quantifiable campus emissions by 75 percent by 2025 and achieving carbon neutrality by 2040. Brown is a member of the Ivy Plus Sustainability Consortium, through which it has committed to best-practice sharing and the ongoing exchange of campus sustainability solutions along with other member institutions.

According to the A. W. Kuchler U.S. potential natural vegetation types, Brown would have a dominant vegetation type of Appalachian Oak (104) with a dominant vegetation form of Eastern Hardwood Forest (25).

== Academics ==
Brown University is accredited by the New England Commission of Higher Education.

=== The College ===
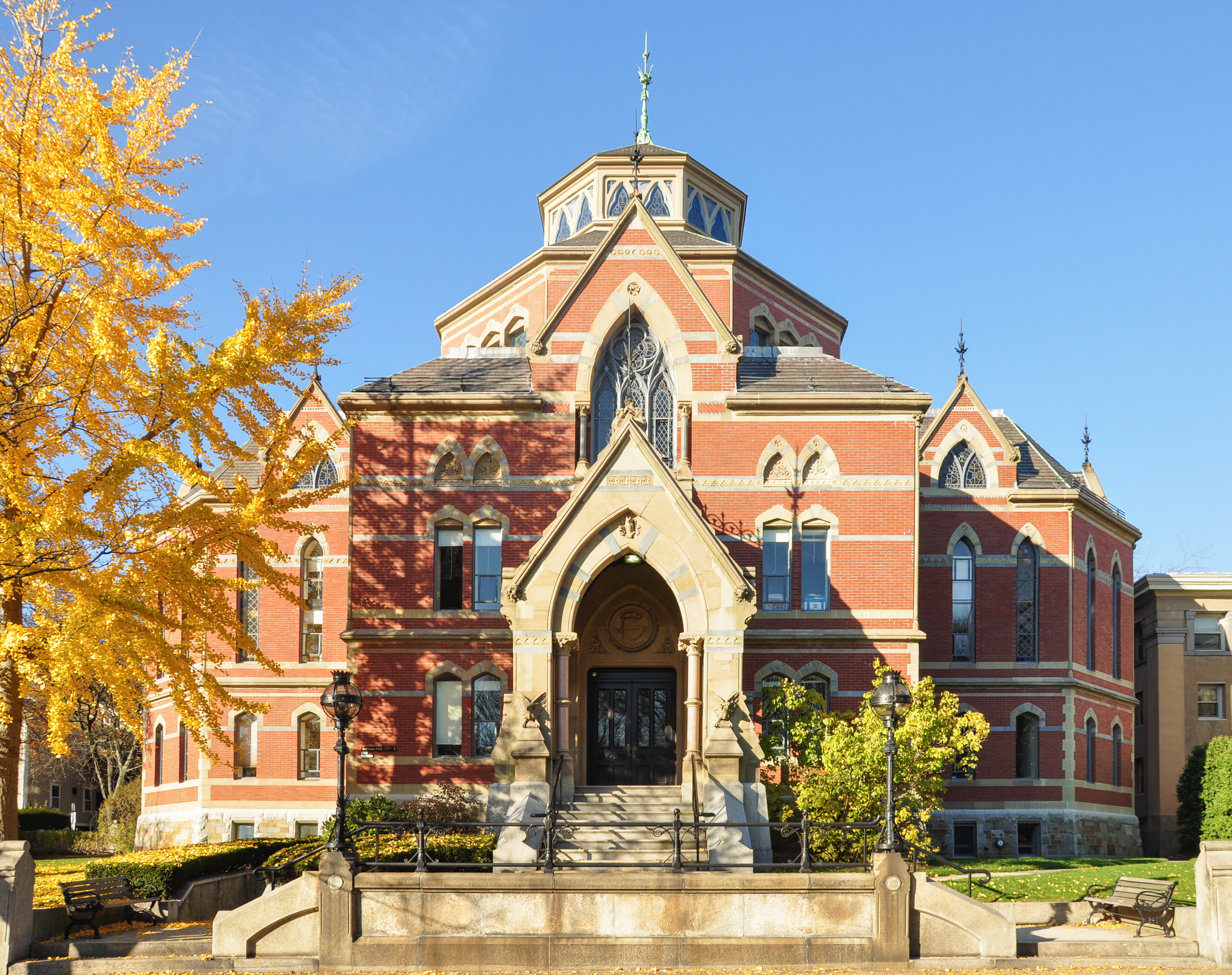
Robinson Hall (1878) was designed by Walker and Gould in the Venetian Gothic style to house Brown's library.

Founded in 1764, the College is Brown's oldest school. About 7,200 undergraduate students are enrolled in the college, and 81 concentrations are offered. For the graduating class of 2020, the most popular concentrations were Computer Science, Economics, Biology, History, Applied Mathematics, International Relations, and Political Science. A quarter of Brown undergraduates complete more than one concentration before graduating. If the existing programs do not align with their intended curricular interests, undergraduates may design and pursue independent concentrations.

Around 35 percent of undergraduates pursue graduate or professional study immediately, 60 percent within 5 years, and 80 percent within 10 years. For the Class of 2009, 56 percent of all undergraduate alumni have since earned graduate degrees. Among undergraduate alumni who go on to receive graduate degrees, the most common degrees earned are J.D. (16%), M.D. (14%), M.A. (14%), M.Sc. (14%), and Ph.D. (11%). The most common institutions from which undergraduate alumni earn graduate degrees are Brown University, Columbia University, and Harvard University.

The highest fields of employment for undergraduate alumni ten years after graduation are education and higher education (15%), medicine (9%), business and finance (9%), law (8%), and computing and technology (7%).

=== Brown and RISD ===
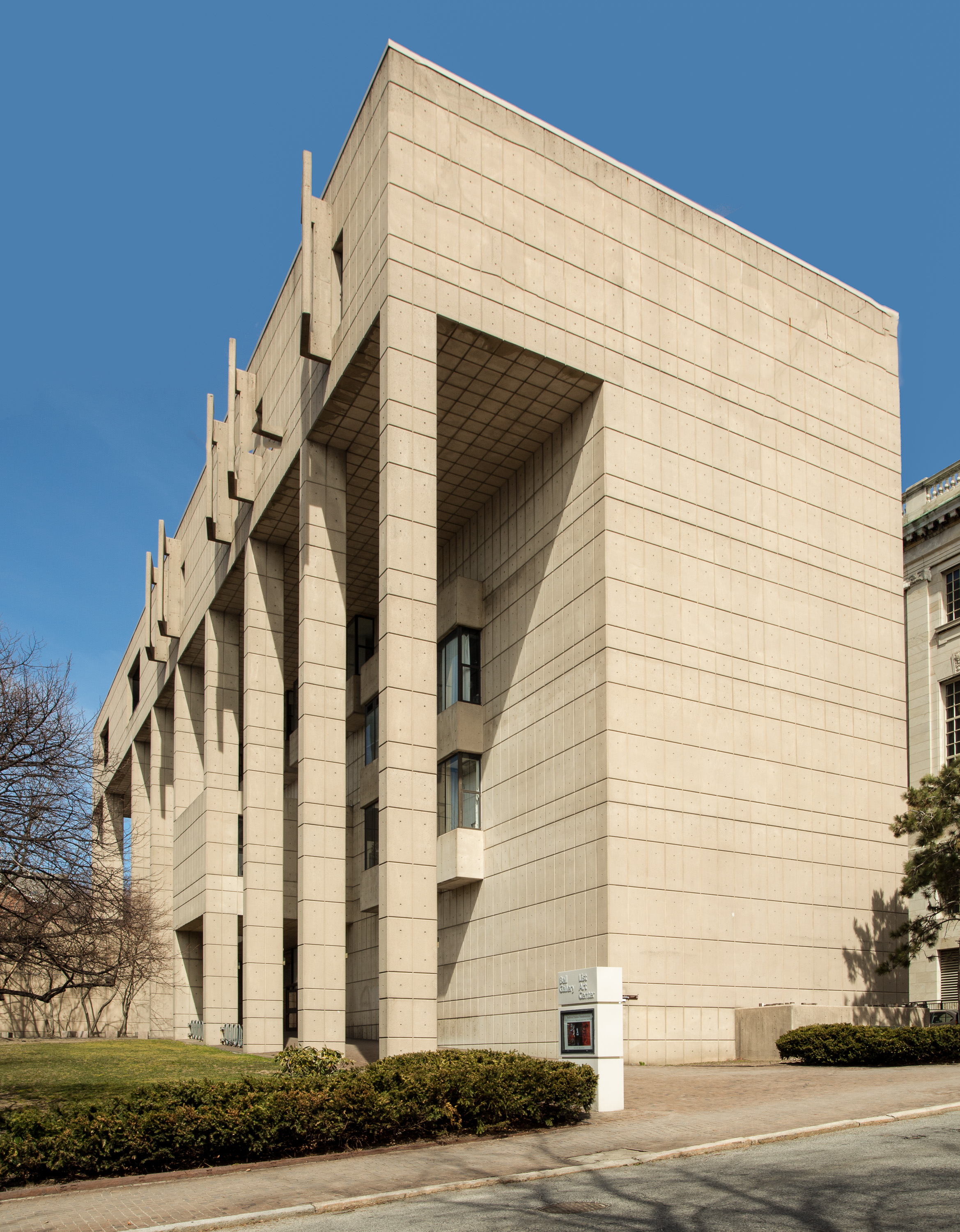
The List Art Center, built 1969–71, designed by Philip Johnson, houses Brown's Department of Visual Art and the David Winton Bell Gallery.

Since its 1893 relocation to College Hill, Rhode Island School of Design (RISD) has bordered Brown to its west. Since 1900, Brown and RISD students have been able to cross-register at the two institutions, with Brown students permitted to take as many as four courses at RISD to count towards their Brown degree. The two institutions partner to provide various student-life services and the two student bodies compose a synergy in the College Hill cultural scene.

==== Dual degree program ====
After several years of discussion between the two institutions and several students pursuing dual degrees unofficially, Brown and RISD formally established a five-year dual degree program in 2007, with the first class matriculating in the fall of 2008. The Brown|RISD Dual Degree Program, among the most selective in the country, offered admission to 20 of the 725 applicants for the class entering in autumn 2020, for an acceptance rate of 2.7%. The program combines the complementary strengths of the two institutions, integrating studio art and design at RISD with Brown's academic offerings. Students are admitted to the dual degree program for a course lasting five years and culminating in both the Bachelor of Arts (A.B.) or Bachelor of Science (Sc.B.) degree from Brown and the Bachelor of Fine Arts (B.F.A.) degree from RISD. Prospective students must apply to the two schools separately and be accepted by separate admissions committees. Their application must then be approved by a third Brown|RISD joint committee.

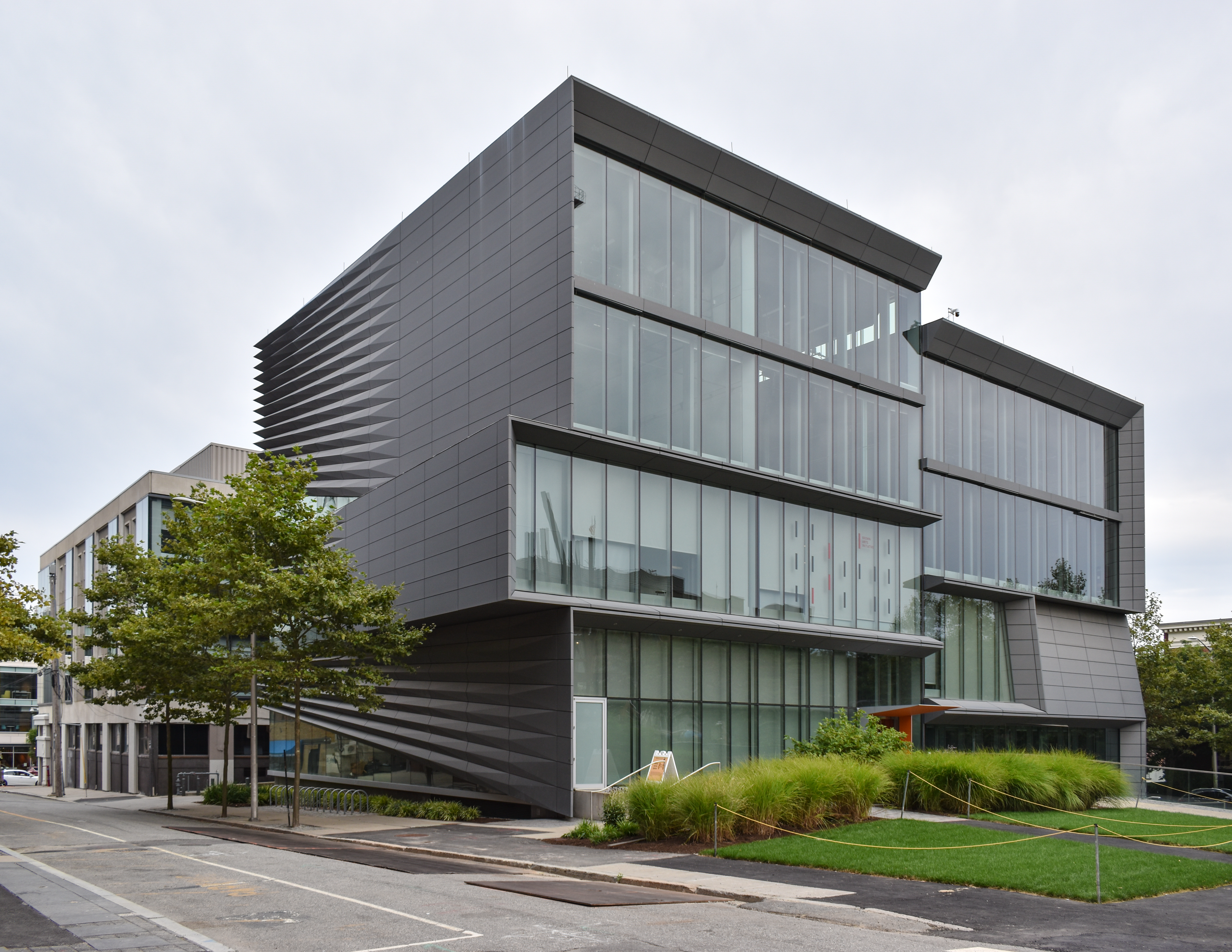
The Granoff Center, designed by Diller Scofidio + Renfro, hosts the annual Brown/RISD Dual Degree exhibition.

In the first year, students live at RISD and complete its first-year Experimental and Foundation Studies curriculum while taking up to three Brown cources. In the second year students live at Brown, during which they take mainly Brown courses while starting on their RISD major requirements. In the third through fifth years, students can elect to live at either school or off-campus, and course distribution is determined by the requirements of each student's unique combination of Brown concentration and RISD major. Students can combine disciplines, for example, industrial design with engineering, anatomical illustration with human biology, philosophy with sculpture or architecture with urban studies. The program holds annual student-organised "BRDD Exhibition" at Brown's Granoff Center for Creative Arts.

==== MADE program ====
In 2020, the two schools announced the establishment of a new joint Master of Arts in Design Engineering program. Abbreviated as MADE, the program intends to combine RISD's programs in industrial design with Brown's programs in engineering. The program is administered through Brown's School of Engineering and RISD's Architecture and Design Division.

=== Theatre and playwriting ===
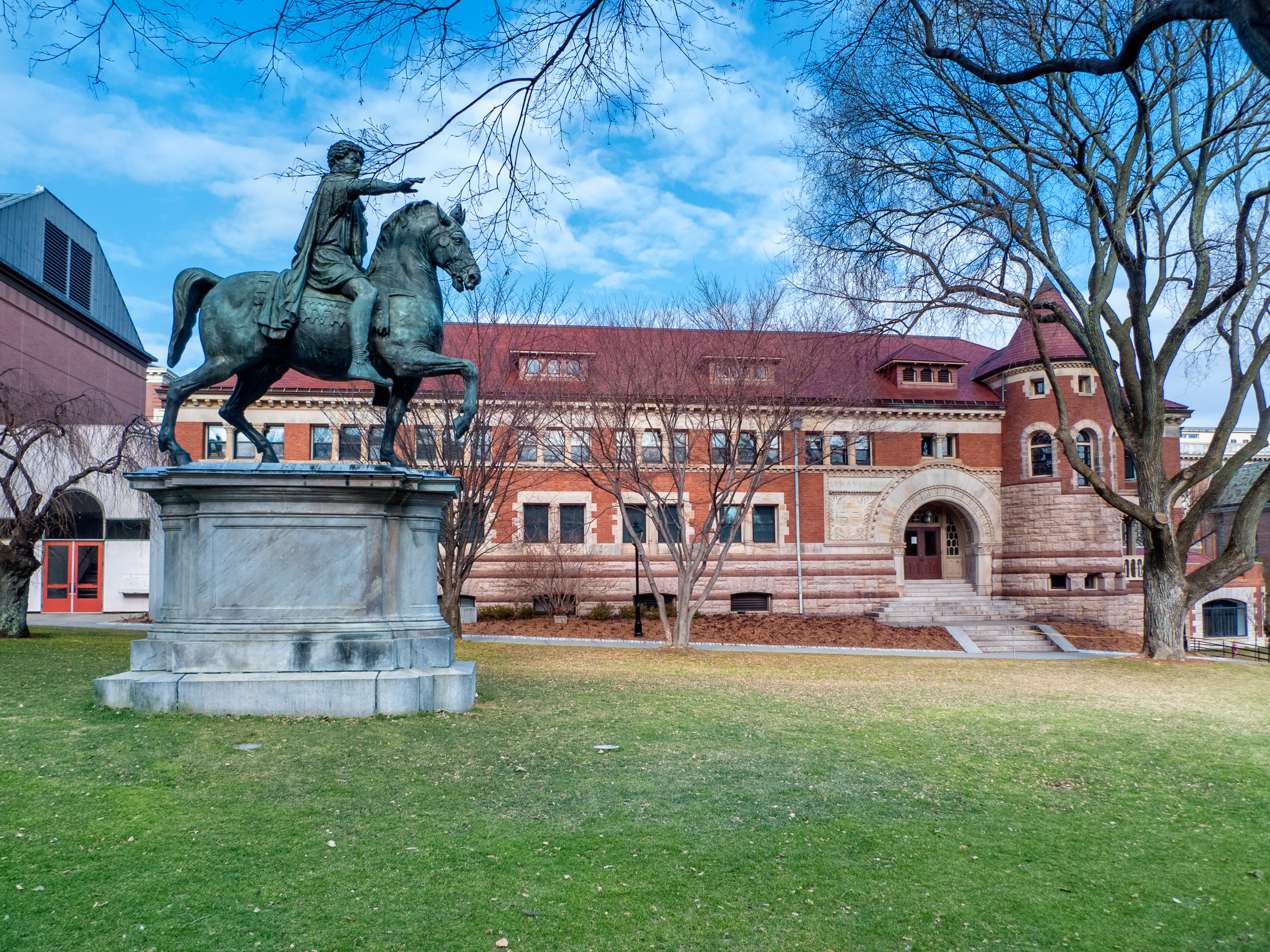
Lyman Hall, built 1890–92, houses the Department of Theatre Arts and Performance Studies.

Brown's theatre and playwriting programs are among the best-regarded in the country. Six Brown graduates have received the Pulitzer Prize for Drama; Alfred Uhry '58, Lynn Nottage '86, Ayad Akhtar '93, Nilo Cruz '94, Quiara Alegría Hudes '04, and Jackie Sibblies Drury MFA '04. In American Theater magazine's 2009 ranking of the most-produced American plays, Brown graduates occupied four of the top five places—Peter Nachtrieb '97, Rachel Sheinkin '89, Sarah Ruhl '97, and Stephen Karam '02.

The undergraduate concentration encompasses programs in theatre history, performance theory, playwriting, dramaturgy, acting, directing, dance, speech, and technical production. Applications for doctoral and master's degree programs are made through the University Graduate School. Master's degrees in acting and directing are pursued in conjunction with the Brown/Trinity Rep MFA program, which partners with the Trinity Repertory Company, a local regional theatre. In January 2025, The Brown/Trinity Rep Master of Fine Arts Programs in Acting and Directing indefinitely paused its new student admissions, effectively ending the program.

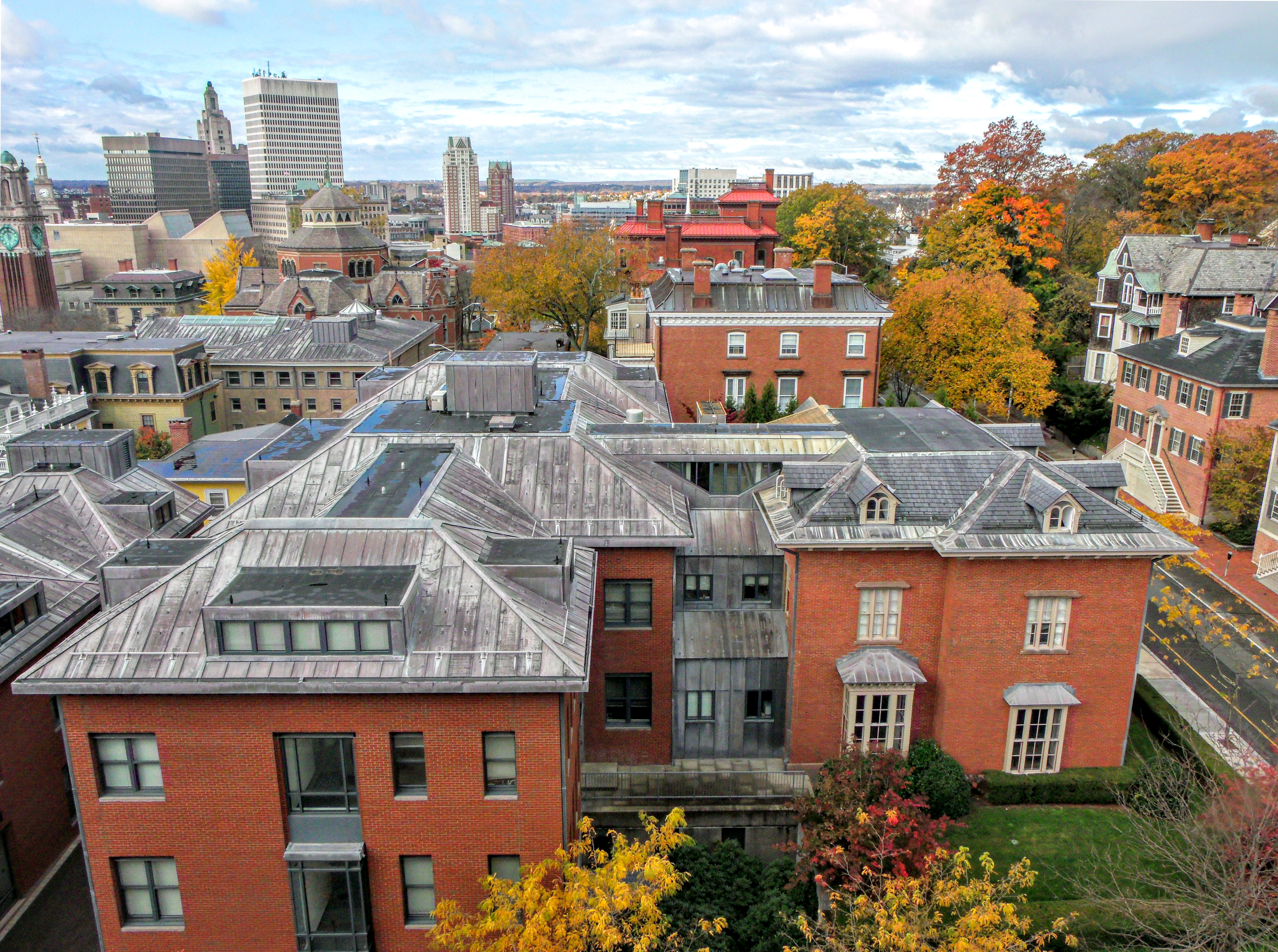
Aerial view of the Brown University English department

=== Writing programs ===
Writing at Brown—fiction, non-fiction, poetry, playwriting, screenwriting, electronic writing, mixed media, and the undergraduate writing proficiency requirement—is catered for by various centers and degree programs, and a faculty that has long included nationally and internationally known authors. The undergraduate concentration in literary arts offers courses in fiction, poetry, screenwriting, literary hypermedia, and translation. Graduate programs include the fiction and poetry MFA writing programs in the literary arts department and the MFA playwriting program in the theatre arts and performance studies department. The non-fiction writing program is offered in the English department. Screenwriting and cinema narrativity courses are offered in the departments of literary arts and modern culture and media. The undergraduate writing proficiency requirement is supported by the Writing Center.

==== Author prizewinners ====
Alumni authors take their degrees across the spectrum of degree concentrations, but a gauge of the strength of writing at Brown is the number of major national writing prizes won. To note only winners since the year 2000: Pulitzer Prize for Fiction-winners Jeffrey Eugenides '82 (2003), Marilynne Robinson '66 (2005), and Andrew Sean Greer '92 (2018); British Orange Prize-winners Marilynne Robinson '66 (2009) and Madeline Miller '00 (2012); Pulitzer Prize for Drama-winners Nilo Cruz '94 (2003), Lynn Nottage '86 (twice, 2009, 2017), Quiara Alegría Hudes '04 (2012), Ayad Akhtar '93 (2013), and Jackie Sibblies Drury MFA '04 (2019); Pulitzer Prize for Biography-winners David Kertzer '69 (2015) and Benjamin Moser '98 (2020); Pulitzer Prize for Journalism-winners James Risen '77 (2006), Gareth Cook '91 (2005), Tony Horwitz '80 (1995), Usha Lee McFarling '89 (2007), David Rohde '90 (1996), Kathryn Schulz '96 (2016), and Alissa J. Rubin '80 (2016); Pulitzer Prize for General Nonfiction-winner James Forman Jr. '88 (2018); Pulitzer Prize for History-winner Marcia Chatelain PhD '08 (2021); Pulitzer Prize for Criticism-winner Salamishah Tillet MAT '97 (2022); and Pulitzer Prize for Poetry-winner Peter Balakian PhD '80 (2016)

=== Computer science ===
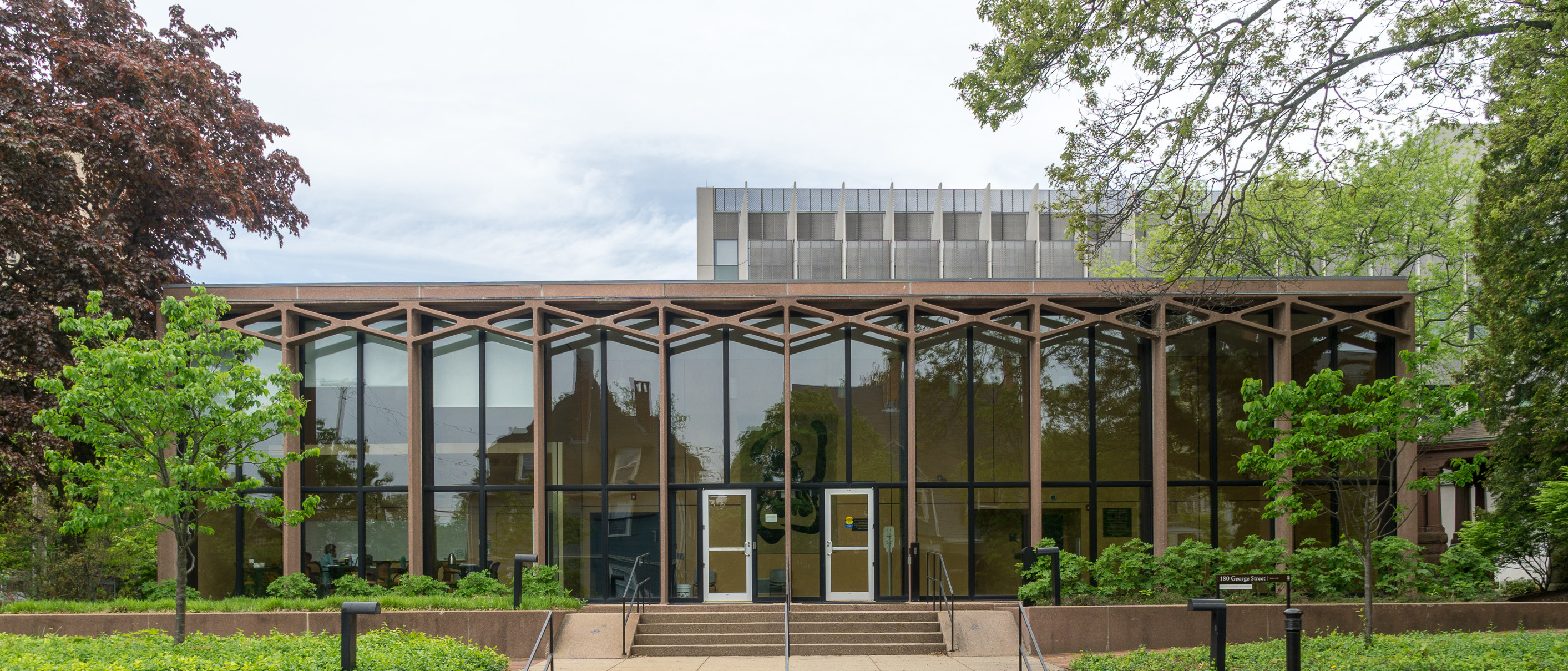
The Brown Computing Laboratory, designed by Philip Johnson

Brown began offering computer science courses through the departments of Economics and Applied Mathematics in 1956 when it acquired an IBM machine. Brown added an IBM 650 in January 1958, the only one of its type between Hartford and Boston. In 1960, Brown opened its first dedicated computer building, the Brown University Computing Laboratory. The facility, designed by Philip Johnson, received an IBM 7070 computer the following year. The first undergraduate Computer Science degrees were awarded in 1974. Brown granted computer sciences full Departmental status in 1979. In 2009, IBM and Brown announced the installation of a supercomputer (by teraflops standards), the most powerful in the southeastern New England region.

In the 1960s, Andries van Dam, along with Ted Nelson and Bob Wallace invented The Hypertext Editing Systems, HES and FRESS while at Brown. Nelson coined the word hypertext while Van Dam's students helped originate XML, XSLT, and related Web standards. Among the school's computer science alumni are principal architect of the Classic Mac OS, Andy Hertzfeld; principal architect of the Intel 80386 and Intel 80486 microprocessors, John Crawford; former CEO of Apple, John Sculley; and digital effects programmer Masi Oka. Other alumni include former CS department head at MIT, John Guttag; software-defined networking pioneer Scott Shenker; Workday founder, Aneel Bhusri; MongoDB founder Eliot Horowitz; Figma founders Dylan Field and Evan Wallace (the latter of whom also created esbuild); OpenSea founder Devin Finzer; and Edward D. Lazowska, professor and Bill & Melinda Gates Foundation Chair emeritus at the University of Washington.

Between 2012 and 2018, the number of concentrators in CS tripled. In 2017, computer science overtook economics as the school's most popular undergraduate concentration.

=== Applied mathematics ===
Brown's program in applied mathematics was established in 1941 making it the oldest such program in the United States. The division is highly ranked and regarded nationally. Among the 67 recipients of the Timoshenko Medal, 22 have been affiliated with Brown's applied mathematics division as faculty, researchers, or students. (Note: Maurice Anthony Biot (1962), William Prager (1966), Hillel Poritsky (1967), Albert E. Green (1974), Chia-Chiao Lin (1975), Erastus H. Lee (1976), George F. Carrier (1978), Daniel C. Drucker (1983), Eli Sternberg (1985), Ronald Rivlin (1987), Bernard Budiansky (1989), James R. Rice (1994), Rodney J. Clifton (2000), L. Ben Freund (2003), Morton Gurtin (2004), Kenneth L. Johnson (2006), Alan Needleman (2011), Subra Suresh (2012), Robert McMeeking (2014), Viggo Tvergaard (2017), Ares J. Rosakis (2018), Huajian Gao (2021))

=== The Joukowsky Institute for Archaeology and the Ancient World ===
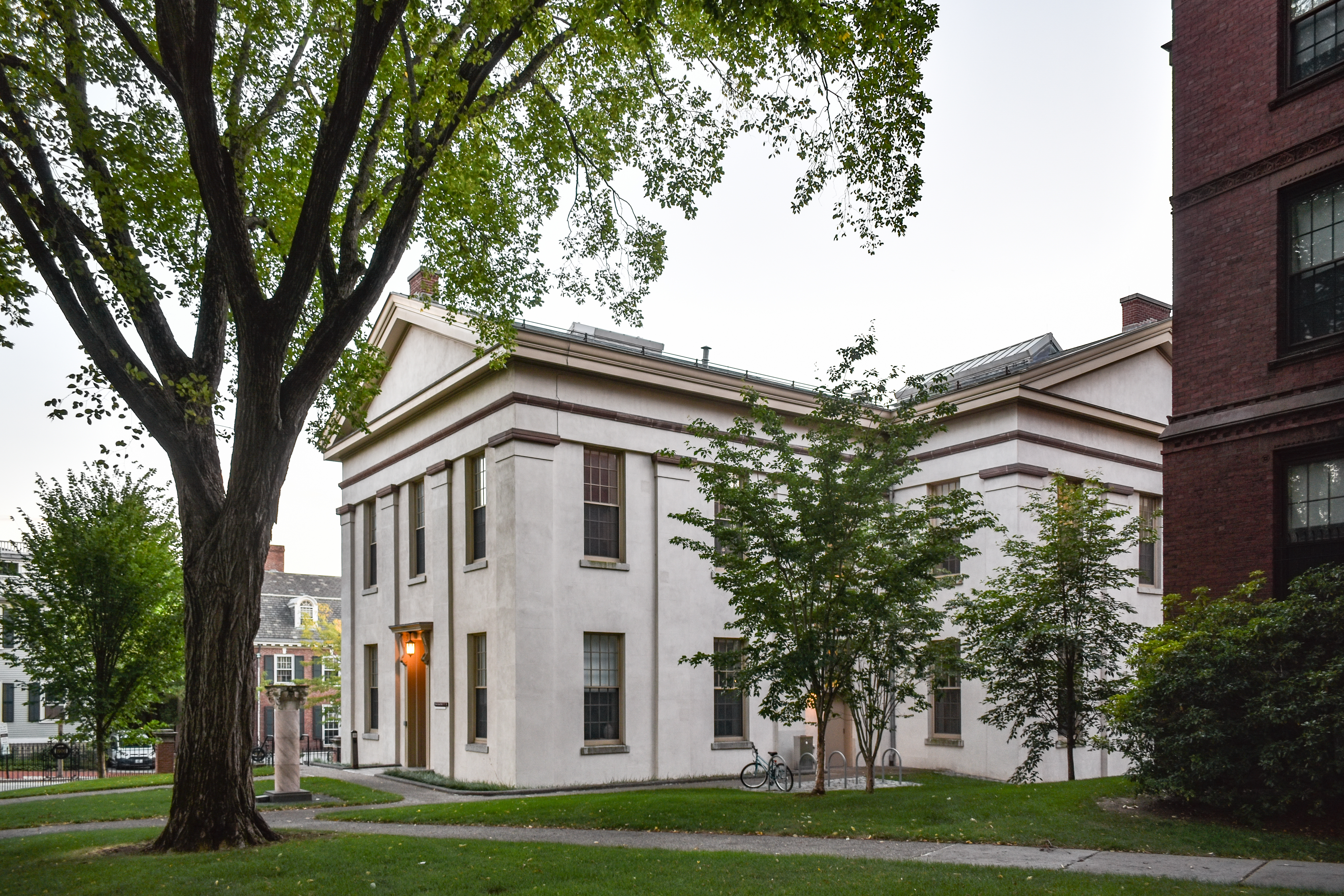
Greek Revival Rhode Island Hall (1840) on the Main Green is home to the Joukowsky Institute.

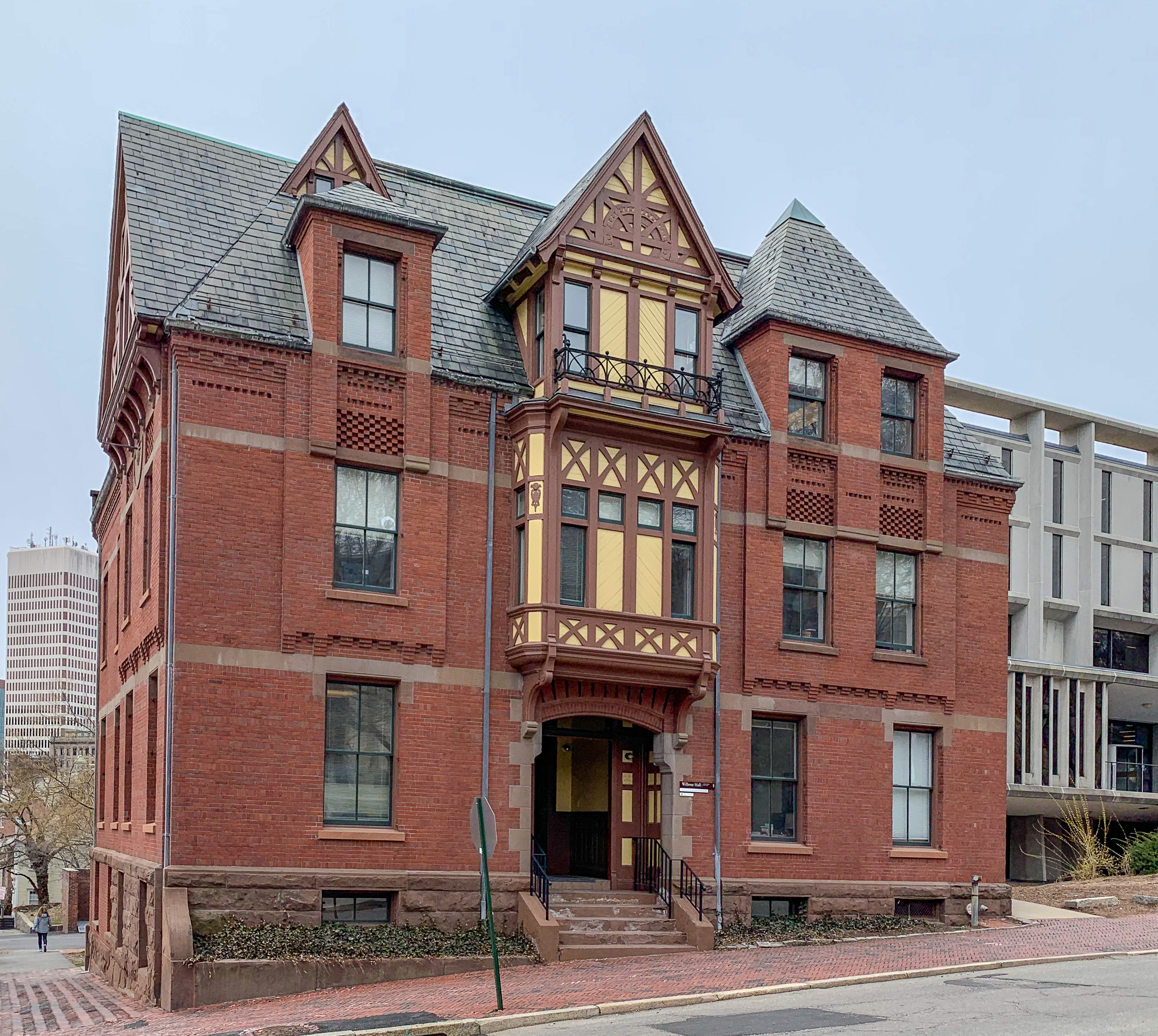
The Department of Egyptology and Assyriology in Wilbour Hall (1888). Wilbour Hall is named for Egyptologist Charles Edwin Wilbour (class of 1854).

Established in 2004, the Joukowsky Institute for Archaeology and the Ancient World is Brown's interdisciplinary research center for archeology and ancient studies. The institute pursues fieldwork, excavations, regional surveys, and academic study of the archaeology and art of the ancient Mediterranean, Egypt, and Western Asia from the Levant to the Caucasus. The institute has a very active fieldwork profile, with faculty-led excavations and regional surveys presently in Petra (Jordan), Abydos (Egypt), Turkey, Sudan, Italy, Mexico, Guatemala, Montserrat, and Providence.

The Joukowsky Institute's faculty includes cross-appointments from the departments of Egyptology, Assyriology, Classics, Anthropology, and History of Art and Architecture. Faculty research and publication areas include Greek and Roman art and architecture, landscape archaeology, urban and religious architecture of the Levant, Roman provincial studies, the Aegean Bronze Age, and the archaeology of the Caucasus. The institute offers visiting teaching appointments and postdoctoral fellowships which have, in recent years, included Near Eastern Archaeology and Art, Classical Archaeology and Art, Islamic Archaeology and Art, and Archaeology and Media Studies.

Egyptology and Assyriology

Facing the Joukowsky Institute, across the Front Green, is the Department of Egyptology and Assyriology, formed in 2006 by the merger of Brown's departments of Egyptology and History of Mathematics. It is one of only a handful of such departments in the United States. The curricular focus is on three principal areas: Egyptology, Assyriology, and the history of the ancient exact sciences (astronomy, astrology, and mathematics). Many courses in the department are open to all Brown undergraduates without prerequisites and include archaeology, languages, history, and Egyptian and Mesopotamian religions, literature, and science. Students concentrating in the department choose a track of either Egyptology or Assyriology. Graduate-level study comprises three tracks to the doctoral degree: Egyptology, Assyriology, or the History of the Exact Sciences in Antiquity.

=== The Watson Institute for International and Public Affairs ===
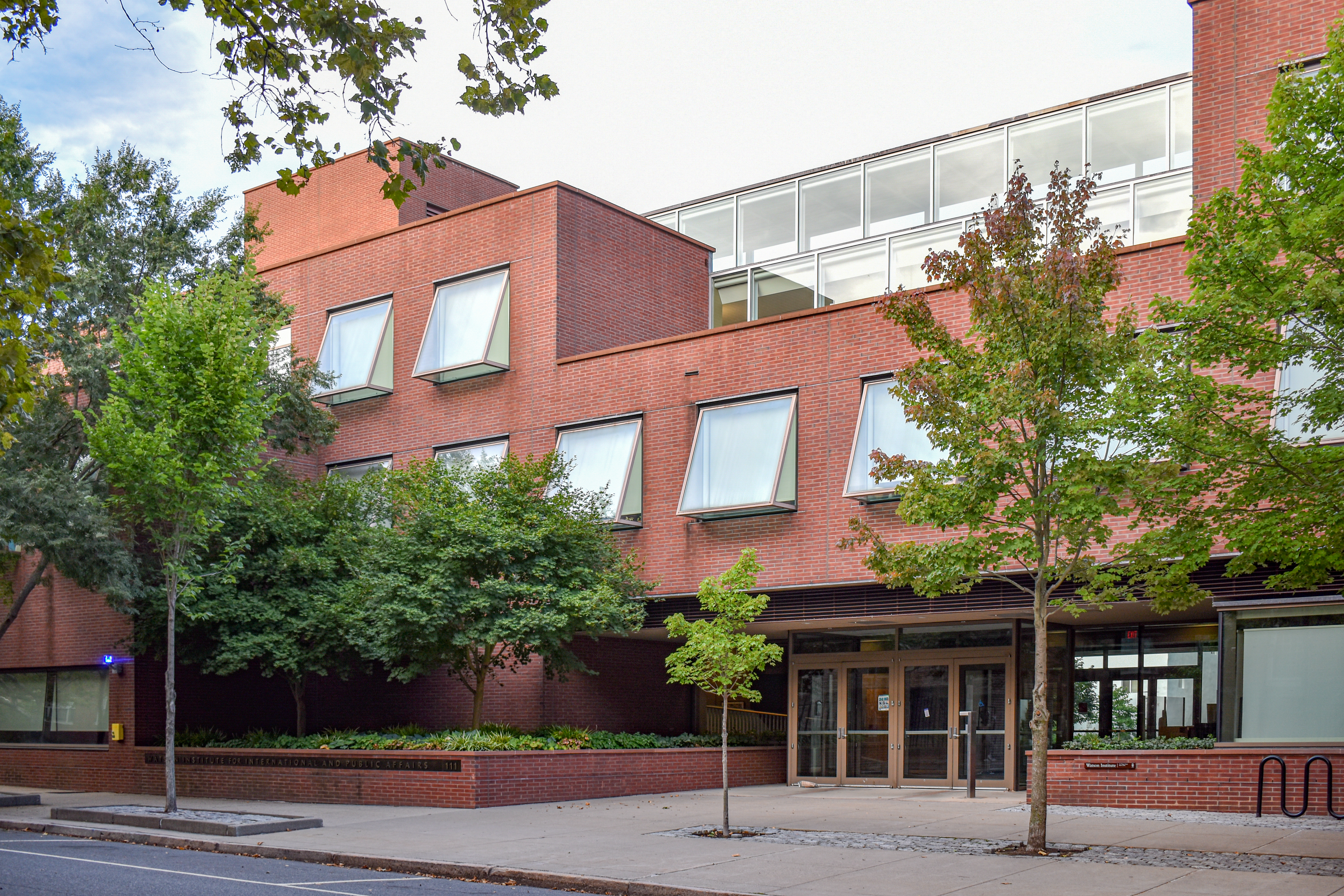
The main building at the Watson Institute for International and Public Affairs was designed by Rafael Viñoly in 2001.

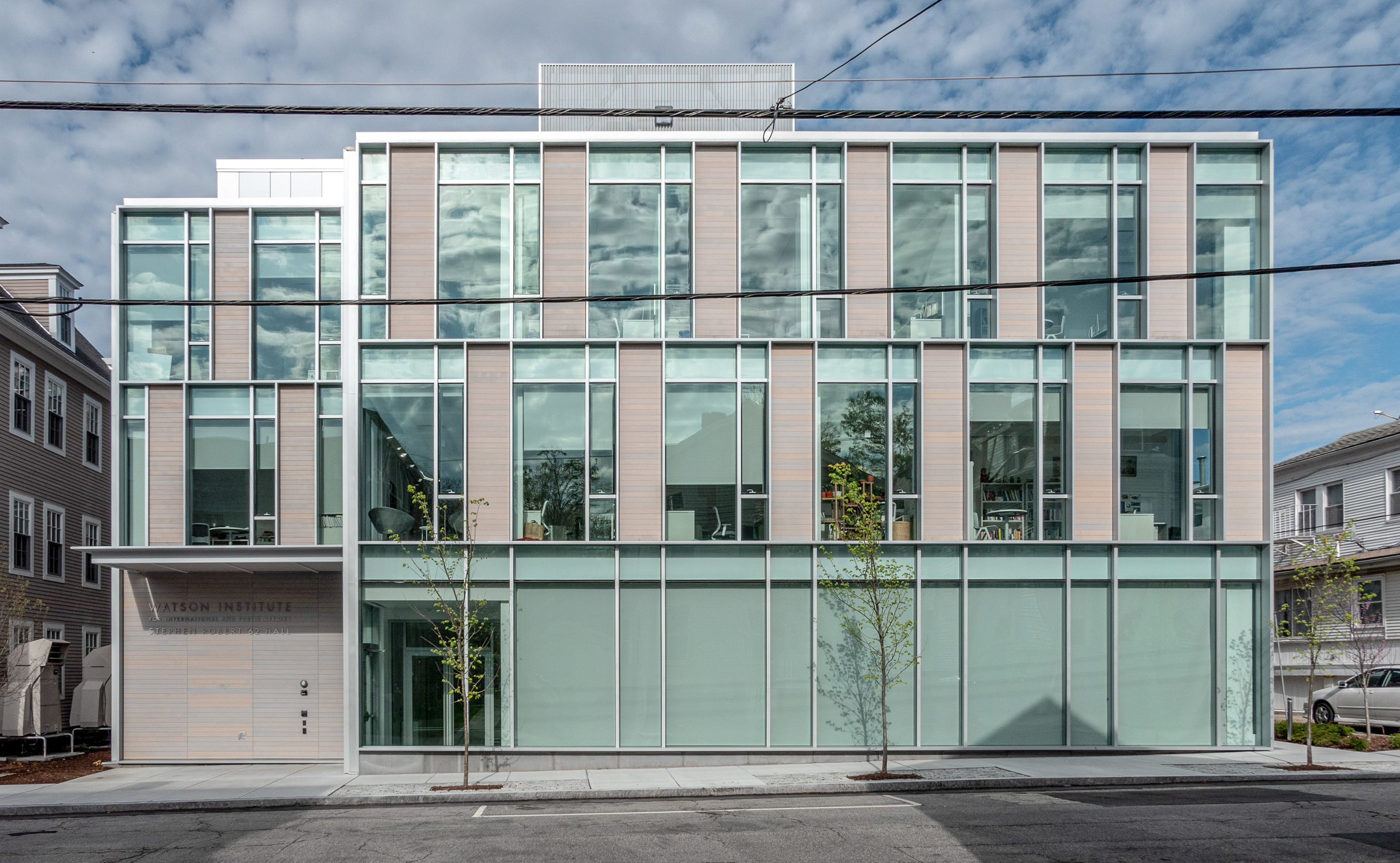
Stephen Robert Hall (2018) at the Watson Institute was designed by Toshiko Mori.

The Watson Institute for International and Public Affairs, Brown's center for the study of global Issues and public affairs, is one of the leading institutes of its type in the country. The institute occupies facilities designed by Uruguayan architect Rafael Viñoly and Japanese architect Toshiko Mori. The institute was initially endowed by Thomas Watson Jr. (Class of 1937), former Ambassador to the Soviet Union and longtime president of IBM.

Institute faculty and faculty emeritus include Italian prime minister and European Commission president Romano Prodi, Brazilian president Fernando Henrique Cardoso, Chilean president Ricardo Lagos Escobar, Mexican novelist and statesman Carlos Fuentes, Brazilian statesman and United Nations commission head Paulo Sérgio Pinheiro, Indian foreign minister and ambassador to the United States Nirupama Rao, American diplomat and Dayton Peace Accords author Richard Holbrooke (Class of 1962), and Sergei Khrushchev, editor of the papers of his father Nikita Khrushchev, leader of the Soviet Union.

The institute's curricular interest is organized into the principal themes of development, security, and governance—with further focuses on globalization, economic uncertainty, security threats, environmental degradation, and poverty. Six Brown undergraduate concentrations are hosted by the Watson Institute: Development Studies, International and Public Affairs, International Relations, Latin American and Caribbean Studies, Middle East Studies, Public Policy, and South Asian Studies. Graduate programs offered at the Watson Institute include the Graduate Program in Development (Ph.D.) and the Master of Public Affairs (M.P.A) Program. The institute also offers postdoctoral, professional development, and global outreach programming. In support of these programs, the institute houses various centers, including the Brazil Initiative, Brown-India Initiative, China Initiative, Middle East Studies Center, The Center for Latin American and Caribbean Studies (CLACS), and the Taubman Center for Public Policy. In recent years, the most internationally cited product of the Watson Institute has been its Costs of War Project, first released in 2011 and continuously updated since. The project comprises a team of economists, anthropologists, political scientists, legal experts, and physicians, and seeks to calculate the economic costs, human casualties, and impact on civil liberties of the wars in Iraq, Afghanistan, and Pakistan since 2001.

=== The School of Engineering ===
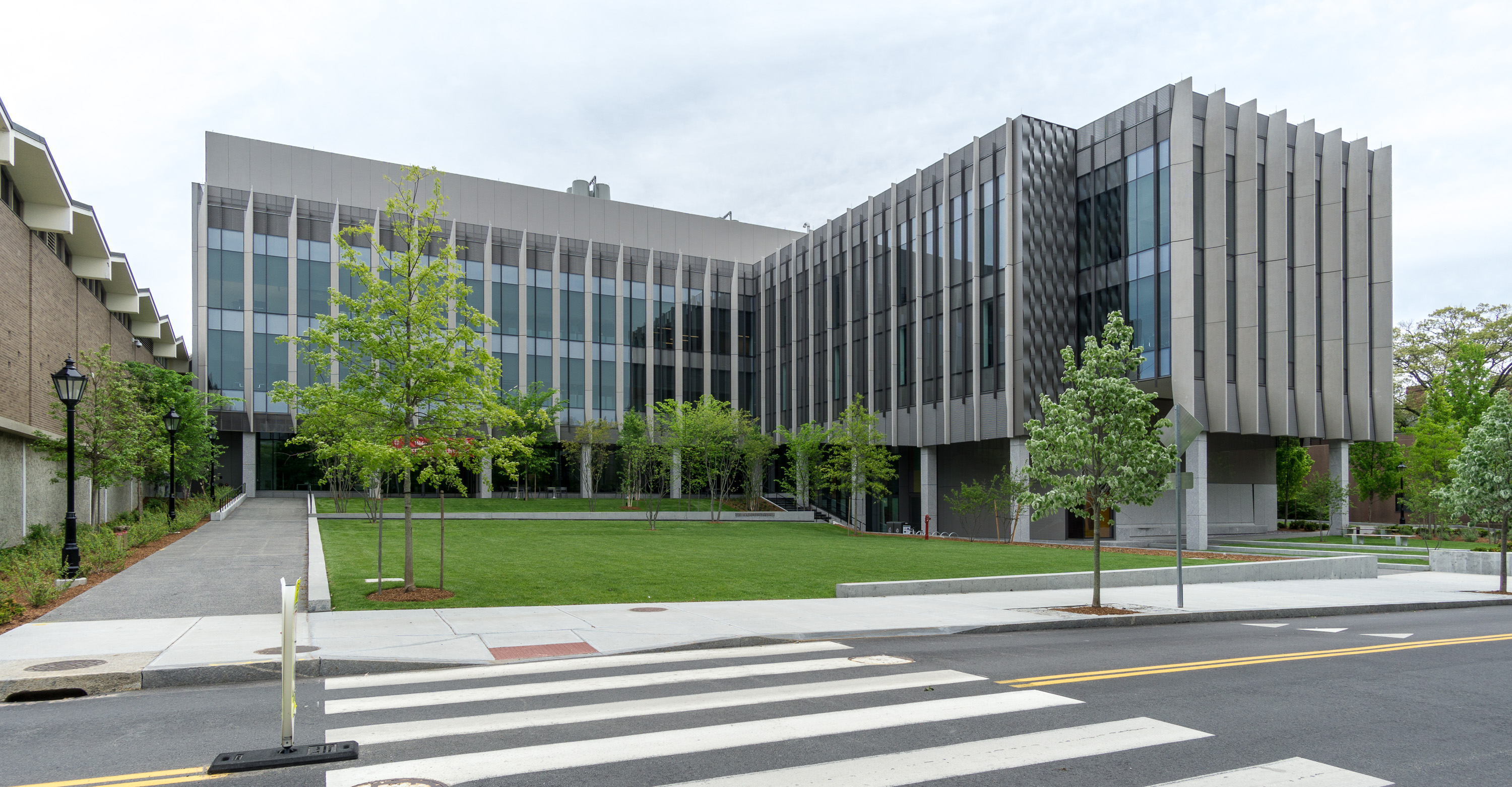
The Brown University Engineering Research Center, completed in 2018 and designed by KieranTimberlake

Established in 1847, Brown's engineering program is the oldest in the Ivy League and the third oldest civilian engineering program in the country. (Note: The program was preceded by that of the Rensselaer Institute (1824) and Union College (1845)) In 1916, Brown's departments of electrical, mechanical, and civil engineering were merged into a single Division of Engineering. In 2010 the division was elevated to a School of Engineering.

Engineering at Brown is especially interdisciplinary. The school is organized without the traditional departments or boundaries found at most schools and follows a model of connectivity between disciplines—including biology, medicine, physics, chemistry, computer science, the humanities, and the social sciences. The school practices an innovative clustering of faculties in which engineers team with non-engineers to bring a convergence of ideas.

Student teams have launched two CubeSats with the support of the School of Engineering. Brown Space Engineering developed EQUiSat a 1U satellite, and another interdisciplinary team developed SBUDNIC a 3U satellite.

=== IE Brown Executive MBA Dual Degree Program ===
Since 2009, Brown has developed an Executive MBA program in conjunction with one of the leading business schools in Europe, IE Business School in Madrid. This relationship has since strengthened, resulting in both institutions offering a dual degree program. In this partnership, Brown provides its traditional coursework, while IE provides most of the business-related subjects, making a differentiated alternative program to other Ivy League EMBAs. The cohort typically consists of 25–30 EMBA candidates from some 20 countries. Classes are held in Providence, Madrid, Cape Town and online.

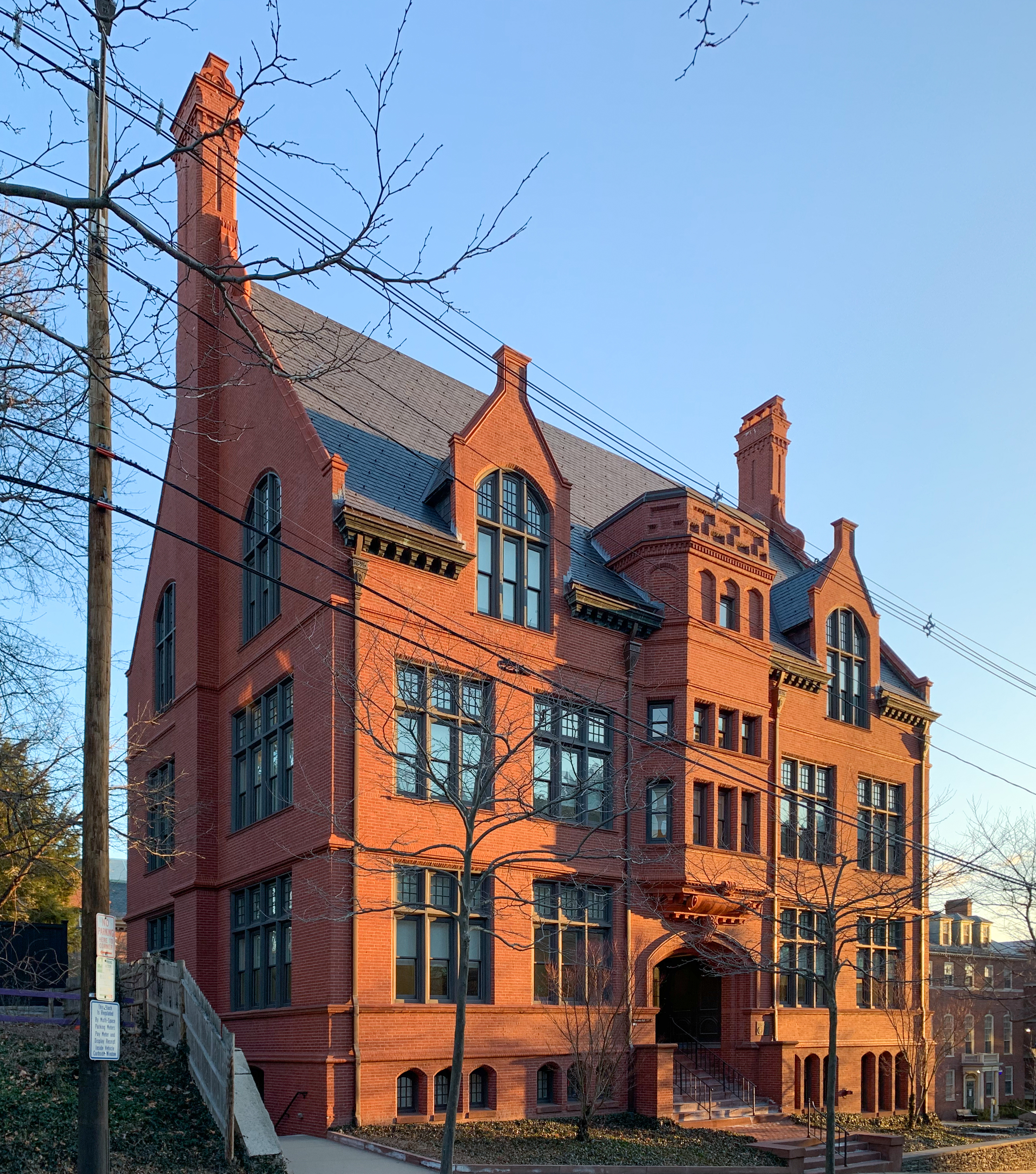
Pembroke Hall (1897) houses the administrative offices of the Pembroke Center for Teaching and Research on Women.

=== The Pembroke Center ===
The Pembroke Center for Teaching and Research on Women was established at Brown in 1981 by Joan Wallach Scott as an interdisciplinary research center on gender. The center is named for Pembroke College, Brown's former women's college, and is affiliated with Brown's Sarah Doyle Women's Center. The Pembroke Center supports Brown's undergraduate concentration in Gender and Sexuality Studies, post-doctoral research fellowships, the annual Pembroke Seminar, and other academic programs. It also manages various collections, archives, and resources, including the Elizabeth Weed Feminist Theory Papers and the Christine Dunlap Farnham Archive.

=== The Graduate School ===
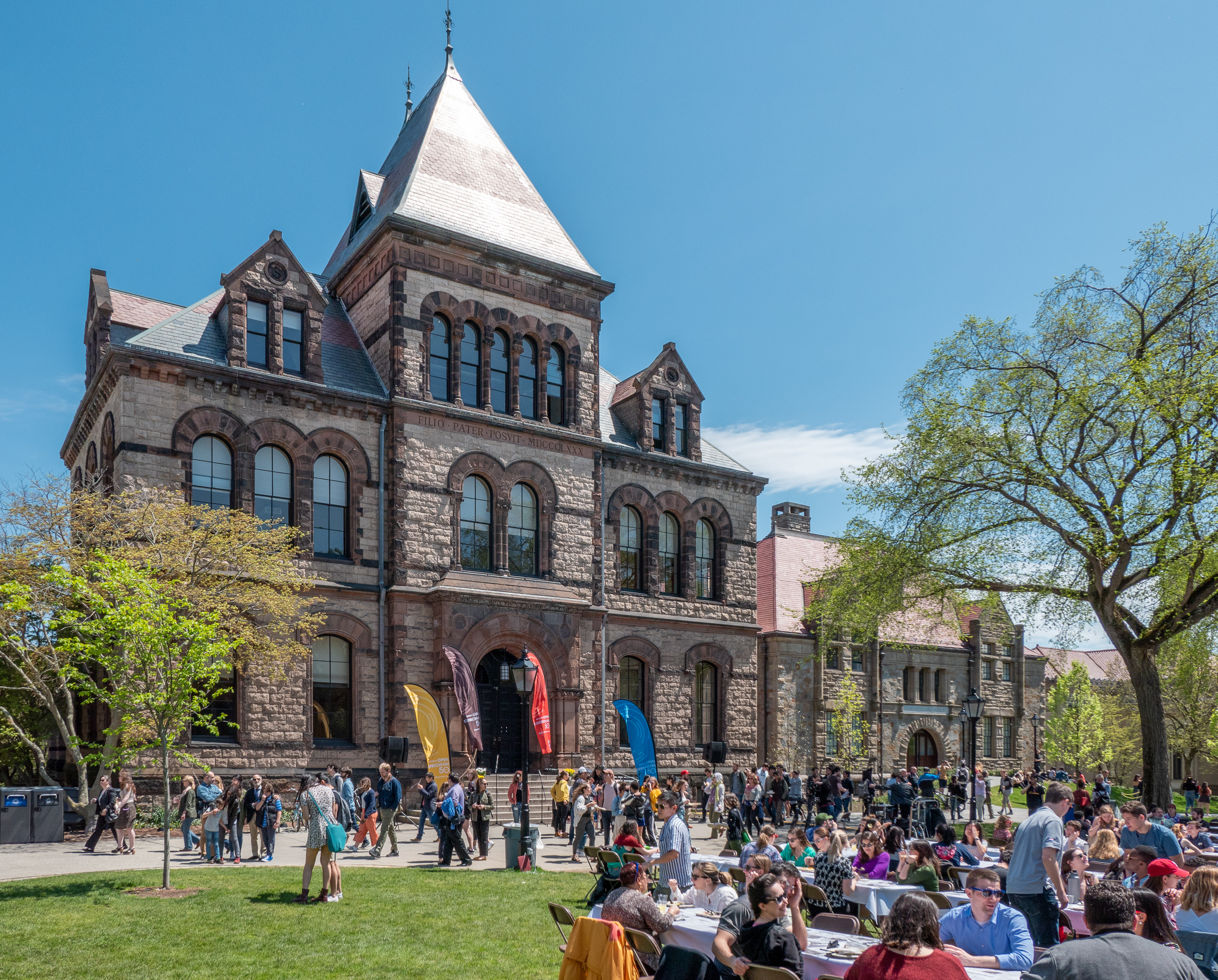
Sayles Hall on the Main Green

Brown introduced graduate courses in the 1870s and granted its first advanced degrees in 1888. The university established a Graduate Department in 1903 and a full Graduate School in 1927.

With an enrollment of approximately 2,600 students, the school currently offers 33 and 51 master's and doctoral programs, respectively. The school additionally offers a number of fifth-year master's programs. Overall, admission to the Graduate School is most competitive, with an acceptance rate averaging at approximately 9 percent in recent years.

=== Carney Institute for Brain Science ===
The Robert J. & Nancy D. Carney Institute for Brain Science is Brown's cross-departmental neuroscience research institute. The institute's core focus areas include brain-computer interfaces and computational neuroscience; additional areas of focus include research into mechanisms of cell death with the interest of developing therapies for neurodegenerative diseases.

The Carney Institute was founded by John Donoghue in 2009 as the Brown Institute for Brain Science and renamed in 2018 in recognition of a $100 million gift. The donation, one of the largest in the university's history, established the institute as one of the best-endowed university neuroscience programs in the country.

=== Alpert Medical School ===
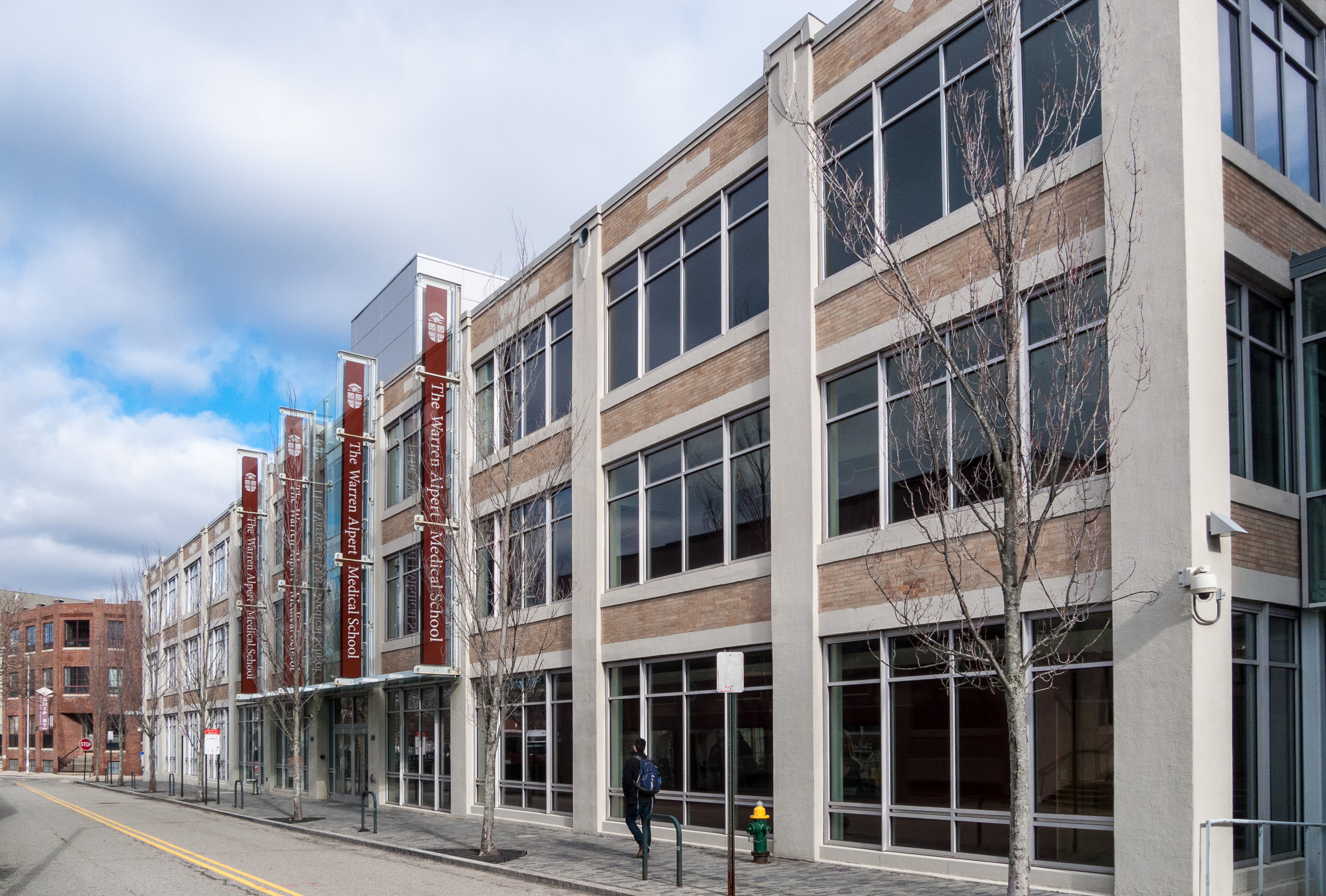
The Alpert Medical School building on Richmond Street

Established in 1811, Brown's Alpert Medical School is the fourth oldest medical school in the Ivy League. (Note: The school's founding was preceded by that of Columbia College of Physicians and Surgeons, Harvard Medical School, and Dartmouth Medical School. While Yale chartered a medical school in 1810, instruction did not begin for another three years.)

In 1827, medical instruction was suspended by President Francis Wayland after the program's faculty declined to follow a new policy requiring students to live on campus. The program was reorganized in 1972; the first M.D. degrees from the new Program in Medicine were awarded to a graduating class of 58 students in 1975. In 1991, the school was officially renamed the Brown University School of Medicine, then renamed once more to Brown Medical School in October 2000. In January 2007, entrepreneur and philanthropist Warren Alpert donated $100 million to the school. In recognition of the gift, the school's name was changed to the Warren Alpert Medical School of Brown University.

In 2020, U.S. News & World Report ranked Brown's medical school the 9th most selective in the country, with an acceptance rate of 2.8%. U.S. News ranks the school 38th for research and 35th for primary care.

Brown's medical school is known especially for its eight-year Program in Liberal Medical Education (PLME), an eight-year combined baccalaureate-M.D. medical program. Inaugurated in 1984, the program is one of the most notable programs of its type in the country, offering admission to only 2% of applicants in 2021.

Since 1976, the Early Identification Program (EIP) has encouraged Rhode Island residents to pursue careers in medicine by recruiting sophomores from Providence College, Rhode Island College, the University of Rhode Island, and Tougaloo College. In 2004, the school once again began to accept applications from premedical students at other colleges and universities via AMCAS like most other medical schools. The medical school also offers M.D./PhD, M.D./M.P.H. and M.D./M.P.P. dual degree programs.

=== School of Public Health ===
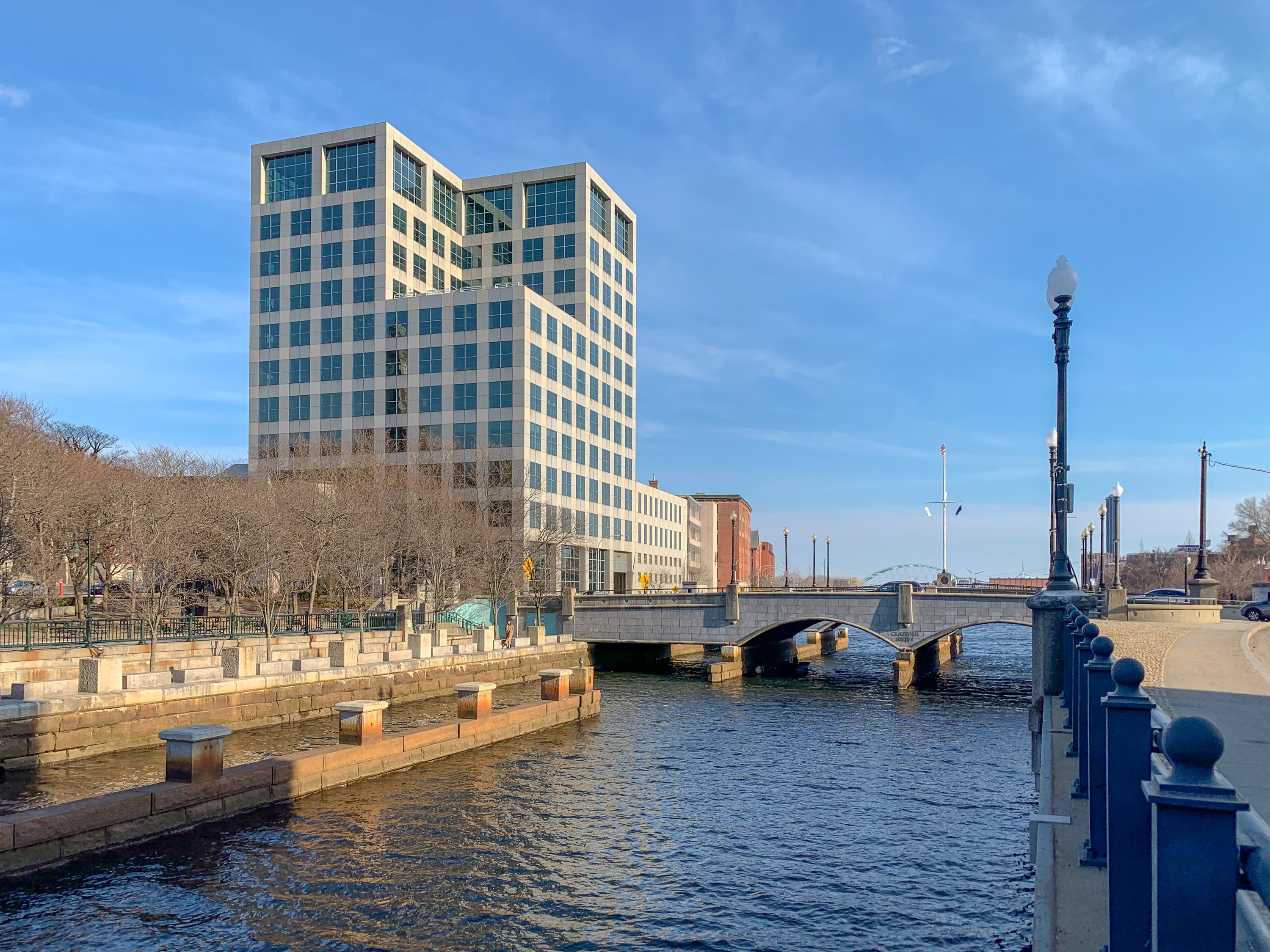
The primary building of the Brown University School of Public Health viewed from across the Providence River

Brown's School of Public Health grew out of the Alpert Medical School's Department of Community Health and was officially founded in 2013 as an independent school. The school issues undergraduate (A.B., Sc.B.), graduate (M.P.H., Sc.M., A.M.), doctoral (Ph.D.), and dual-degrees (M.P.H./M.P.A., M.D./M.P.H.).

=== Online programs ===
The Brown University School of Professional Studies currently offers blended learning Executive master's degrees in Healthcare Leadership, Cyber Security, and Science and Technology Leadership. The master's degrees are designed to help students who have a job and life outside of academia to progress in their respective fields. The students meet in Providence every 6–7 weeks for a weekly seminar each trimester.

The university has also invested in MOOC development starting in 2013, when two courses, Archeology's Dirty Little Secrets and The Fiction of Relationship, both of which received thousands of students. However, after a year of courses, the university broke its contract with Coursera and revamped its online persona and MOOC development department. By 2017, the university released new courses on edx, two of which were The Ethics of Memory and Artful Medicine: Art's Power to Enrich Patient Care. In January 2018, Brown published its first "game-ified" course called Fantastic Places, Unhuman Humans: Exploring Humanity Through Literature, which featured out-of-platform games to help learners understand materials, as well as a story-line that immerses users into a fictional world to help characters along their journey.

== Admissions and financial aid ==
Undergraduate admissions statistics
- 2021 entering class
- Admit rate: 7.67% (▼ −1.79)
- Yield rate: 62.05% (▲ +1.25)

Test scores middle 50%
- SAT EBRW: 750–780
- SAT Math: 750–790
- ACT Composite: 34–36

High school GPA^{[ii]}
- Top 10%: 95% (▲ +4.7)

=== Undergraduate ===
Undergraduate admission to Brown University is considered "most selective" by U.S. News & World Report. For the undergraduate class of 2026, Brown received 50,649 applications—the largest applicant pool in the university's history and a 9% increase from the prior year. Of these applicants, 2,560 were admitted for an acceptance rate of 5.0%, the lowest in the university's history.

In 2021, the university reported a yield rate of 69%. For the academic year 2019–20 the university received 2,030 transfer applications, of which 5.8% were accepted.

Brown's admissions policy is currently stipulated need-blind for all domestic first-year applicants, but will be extended to international first-year applicants starting with the Class of 2029. In 2017, Brown announced that loans would be eliminated from all undergraduate financial aid awards starting in 2018–2019, as part of a new $30 million campaign called the Brown Promise. In 2016–17, the university awarded need-based scholarships worth $120.5 million. The average need-based award for the class of 2020 was $47,940.

=== Graduate ===
In 2017, the Graduate School accepted 11% of 9,215 applicants. In 2021, Brown received a record 948 applications for roughly 90 spots in its Master of Public Health Degree.

In 2020, U.S. News ranked Brown's Warren Alpert Medical School the 9th most selective in the country, with an acceptance rate of 2.8 percent.

== Rankings ==
Academic rankings

National
- Forbes: 18
- U.S. News & World Report: 13 (tie)
- Washington Monthly: 17
- WSJ/College Pulse: 27

Global
- ARWU: 100–150
- QS: 69
- THE: 58
- U.S. News & World Report: 150 (tie)

USNWR graduate school rankings (2022)
Engineering	53
Medicine (Primary Care)	14
Medicine (Research)	35

USNWR departmental rankings (2022)
Biological Sciences	37
Biostatistics	13
Chemistry	62
Computer Science	26
Earth Sciences	12
Economics	20
English	13
History	18
Mathematics	14
Physics	28
Political Science	41
Psychology	23
Public Affairs	62
Public Health	16
Sociology	20

For their 2021 rankings, The Wall Street Journal/Times Higher Education ranked Brown 5th in the "Best Colleges 2021" edition.

The Forbes magazine annual ranking of "America's Top Colleges 2022"—which ranked 600 research universities, liberal arts colleges and service academies—ranked Brown 19th overall and 18th among universities.

U.S. News & World Report ranked Brown 9th among national universities in its 2023 edition. The 2022 edition also ranked Brown 2nd for undergraduate teaching, 25th in Most Innovative Schools, and 14th in Best Value Schools.

Washington Monthly ranked Brown 30th in 2024 among 438 national universities in the U.S. based on its contribution to the public good, as measured by social mobility, research, and promoting public service.

In 2022, U.S. News & World Report ranked Brown 129th globally.

In 2016, 2017, 2018, and 2021, the university produced the most Fulbright recipients of any university in the nation. Through 2018, Brown produced the 7th most Rhodes Scholars of all colleges and universities in the United States.

In 2025, the university was ranked 229 of 257 top colleges in free speech rankings by the Foundation for Individual Rights and Expression, having been ranked by FIRE at 69 in 2024 and at 114 in 2022/2023.

== Research ==
Brown is a member of the Association of American Universities since 1933 and is classified among "R1: Doctoral Universities – Very High Research Activity". In FY 2017, Brown spent $212.3 million on research and was ranked 103rd in the United States by total R&D expenditure by National Science Foundation. In 2021 Brown's School of Public Health received the 4th most funding in NIH awards among schools of public health in the U.S.

== Student life ==
Undergraduate demographics as of fall 2023
Race and ethnicity	Total
White	36%
Asian	20%
Hispanic	12%
International student	12%
Black	9%
Two or more races	8%
Unknown	2%
Economic diversity
Low-income (Note: The percentage of students who received an income-based federal Pell grant intended for low-income students.)	14%
Affluent (Note: The percentage of students who are a part of the American middle class at the bare minimum.)	86%

=== Spring weekend ===
Established in 1950, Spring Weekend is an annual spring music festival for students. Historical performers at the festival have included Ella Fitzgerald, Dizzy Gillespie, Ray Charles, Bob Dylan, Janis Joplin, Bruce Springsteen, and U2. More recent headliners include Kendrick Lamar, Young Thug, Daniel Caesar, Anderson .Paak, Mitski, Aminé, and Mac DeMarco. Since 1960, Spring Weekend has been organized by the student-run Brown Concert Agency.

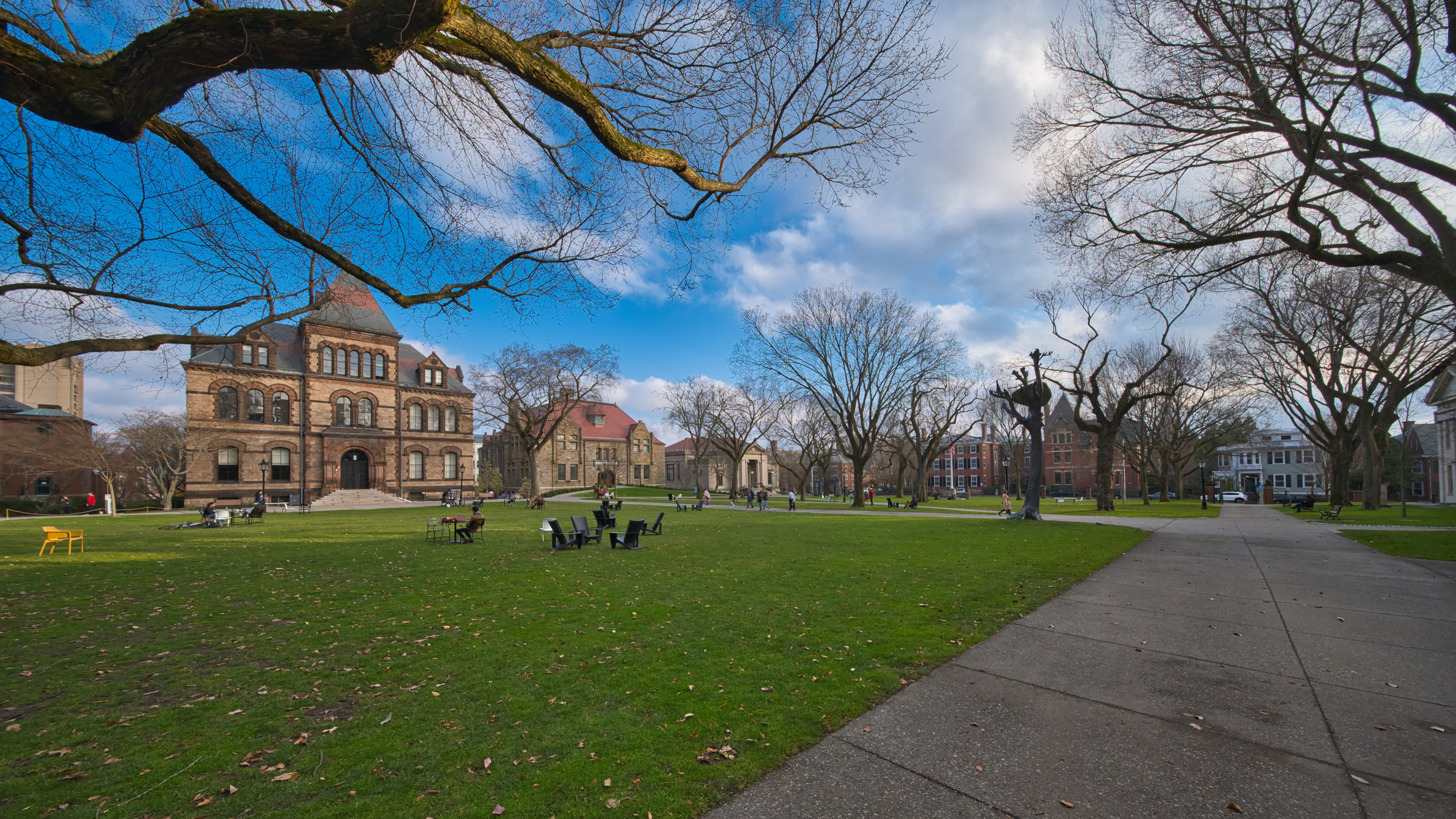
Many Spring Weekend events are hosted on Brown's Main Green.

=== Residential and Greek societies ===
Approximately 12 percent of Brown students participate in Greek life. The university recognizes thirteen active Greek organizations. Since the early 1950s, all Greek organizations on campus have been located in Wriston Quadrangle.

=== Societies and clubs ===
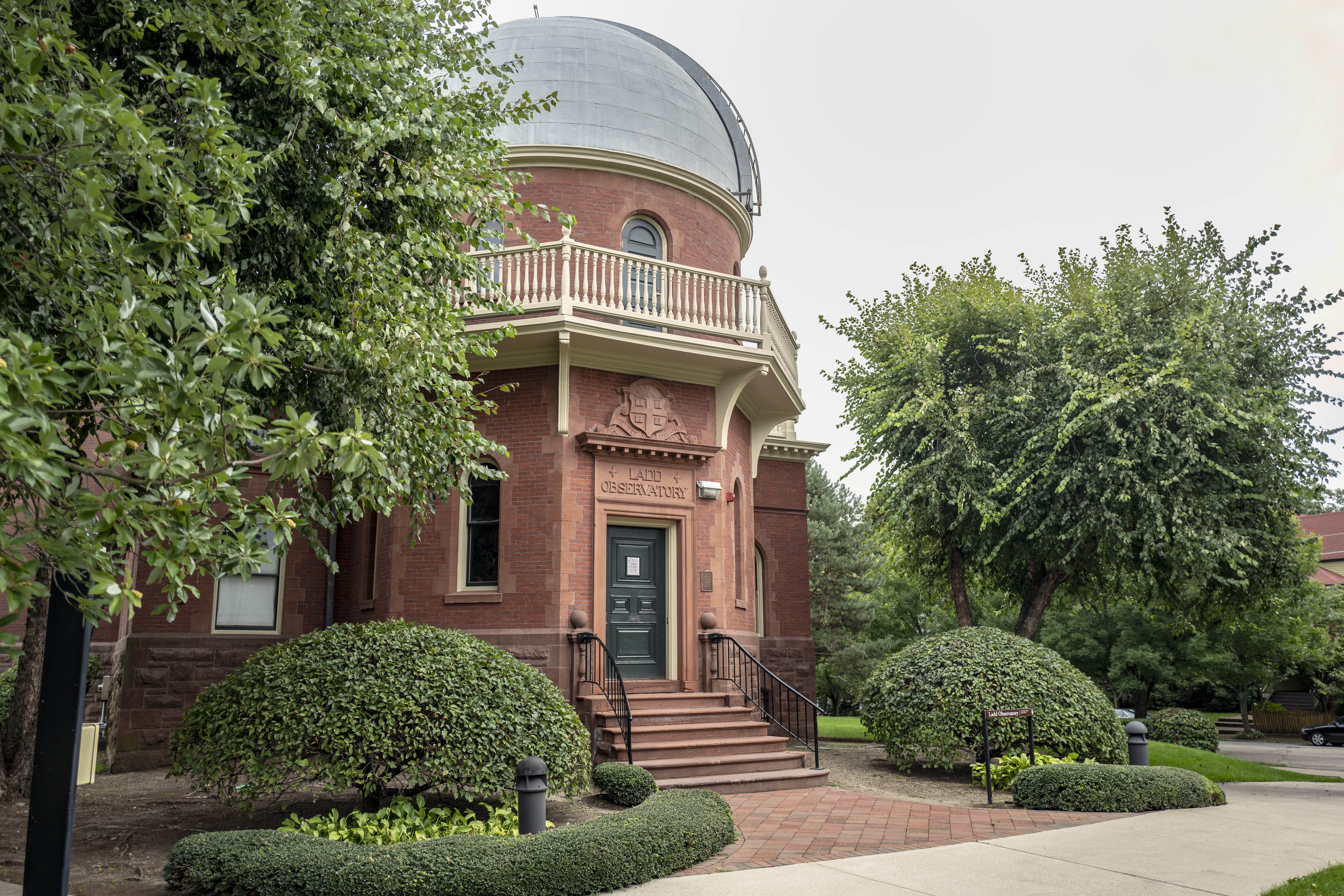
Ladd Observatory, built 1890–1891, is used by Brown Space Engineering, a student group focused on aerospace engineering.

The earliest societies at Brown were devoted to oration and debate. The Pronouncing Society is mentioned in the diary of Solomon Drowne, class of 1773, who was voted its president in 1771. The organization seems to have disappeared during the American Revolutionary War. Subsequent societies include the Misokosmian Society (est. 1798 and renamed the Philermenian Society), the Philandrian Society (est. 1799), the United Brothers (1806), the Philophysian Society (1818), and the Franklin Society (1824). Societies served social as well as academic purposes, with many supporting literary debate and amassing large libraries. Older societies generally aligned with Federalists while younger societies generally leaned Republican.

Societies remained popular into the 1860s, after which they were largely replaced by fraternities.

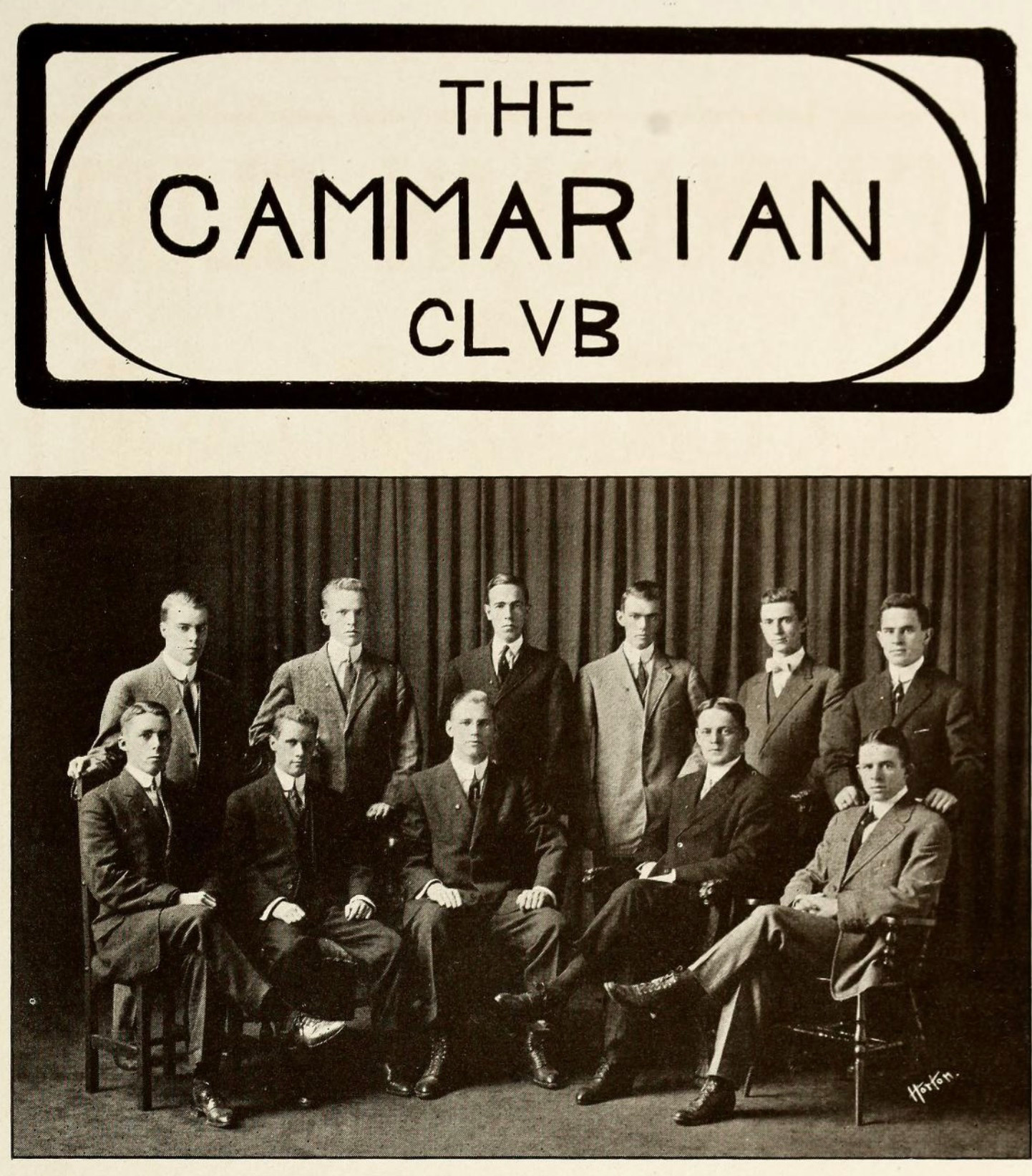
The Cammarian Club in 1910

The Cammarian Club was at first a semi-secret society that "tapped" 15 seniors each year. In 1915, self-perpetuating membership gave way to popular election by the student body, and thenceforward the club served as the de facto undergraduate student government. The organization was dissolved in 1971 and ultimately succeeded by a formal student government.

Societas Domi Pacificae, known colloquially as "Pacifica House", is a present-day, self-described secret society. It purports a continuous line of descent from the Franklin Society of 1824, citing a supposed intermediary "Franklin Society" traceable in the nineteenth century.

=== Student organizations ===
There are over 300 registered student organizations on campus with diverse interests. The Student Activities Fair, during the orientation program, provides first-year students the opportunity to become acquainted with a wide range of organizations. A sample of organizations includes:

- The Brown Daily Herald
- Brown Debating Union
- The Brown Derbies
- Brown International Organization
- Brown Journal of World Affairs
- The Brown Jug
- The Brown Noser
- Brown Political Review
- The Brown Spectator
- Brown University Band
- Brown University Orchestra
- BSR
- Chinese Students and Scholars Association
- The College Hill Independent
- Critical Review
- Ivy Film Festival
- Jabberwocks
- Production Workshop
- Starla and Sons
- Strait Talk
- Students for Sensible Drug Policy
- WBRU

=== LGBTQ+ ===
In 2023, 38% of Brown's students identified as being LGBTQ+, in a poll by The Brown Daily Herald. This was an increase of 14% over the LGBT self-identification in 2010. "Bisexual" was the most common answer among LGBTQ+ respondents to the poll.

=== Resource centers ===
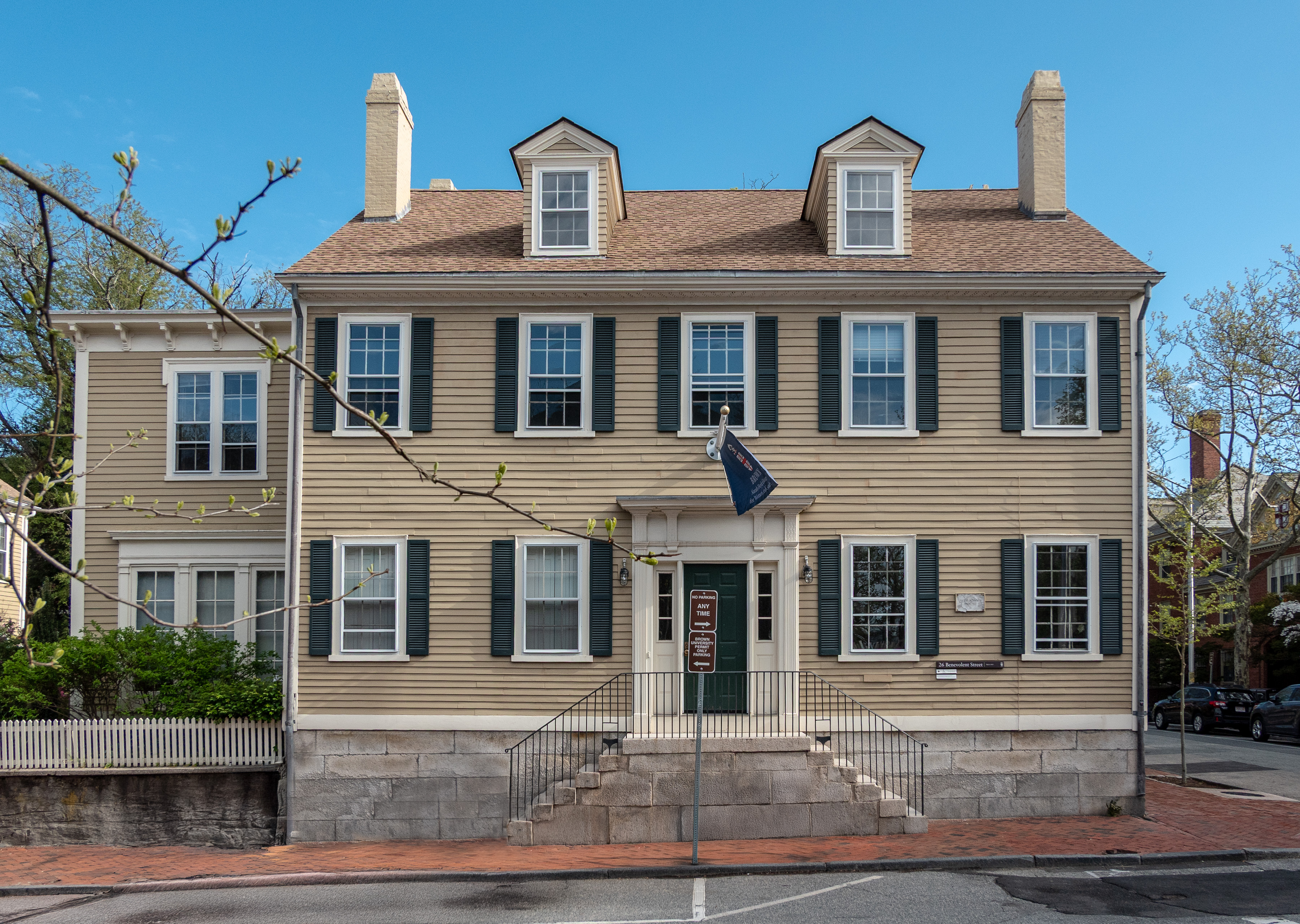
The Sarah Doyle Women's Center

Brown has several resource centers on campus. The centers often act as sources of support as well as safe spaces for students to explore certain aspects of their identity. Additionally, the centers often provide physical spaces for students to study and have meetings. Although most centers are identity-focused, some provide academic support as well.

The Brown Center for Students of Color (BCSC) is a space that provides support for students of color. Established in 1972 at the demand of student protests, the BCSC encourages students to engage in critical dialogue, develop leadership skills, and promote social justice. The center houses various programs for students to share their knowledge and engage in discussion. Programs include the Third World Transition Program, the Minority Peer Counselor Program, the Heritage Series, and other student-led initiatives. Additionally, the BCSC hopes to foster community among the students it serves by providing spaces for students to meet and study.

The Sarah Doyle Women's Center aims to provide a space for members of the Brown community to examine and explore issues surrounding gender. The center was named after one of the first women to attend Brown, Sarah Doyle. The center emphasizes intersectionality in its conversations on gender, encouraging people to see gender as present and relevant in various aspects of life. The center hosts programs and workshops in order to facilitate dialogue and provide resources for students, faculty, and staff.

Other centers include the LGBTQ Center, the Undocumented, First-Generation College and Low-Income Student (U-FLi) Center, and the Curricular Resource Center.

=== Activism ===
==== 1968 Black student walkout ====
On December 5, 1968, several Black women from Pembroke College initiated a walkout in protest of an atmosphere at the colleges described by Black students as a "stifling, frustrating, [and] degrading place for Black students" after feeling the colleges were non-responsive to their concerns. In total, 65 Black students participated in the walkout. Their principal demand was to increase Black student enrollment to 11% of the student populace, in an attempt to match that of the proportion in the US. This ultimately resulted in a 300% increase in Black enrollment the following year, but some demands have yet to be met.

==== Rape lists ====
In the 1990s, walls in women's bathrooms in the John D. Rockefeller Jr. Library were used to graffiti names of alleged male rapists. The practice caused the school to re-evaluate how it handles sexual misbehaviour on campus.

==== Divestment from South Africa ====
In the mid-1980s, under student pressure, the university divested from certain companies involved in South Africa. Some students were still unsatisfied with partial divestment and began a fast in Manning Chapel and the university disenrolled them. In April 1987, "dozens" of students interrupted a university corporation meeting, leading to 20 being put on probation.

==== Protest of speech by NYPD Commissioner Ray Kelly ====
In 2013, students and Providence community members protested and disrupted a speech by then-NYPD Commissioner Raymond Kelly. The incident was cited by Greg Lukianoff, president of the Foundation for Individual Rights and Expression, as a high-profile example of a form of student protest questioning conceptions of free speech. The incident was also the subject of a short critical documentary in 2016 by Brown alumnus Rob Montz.

==== Israel-Gaza protests ====
In early November 2023, twenty students of Jewish background affiliated with the campus group "Jews for Ceasefire Now" (later renamed "Jews for Palestinian Liberation") staged a sit in at University Hall, resulting in their arrests by order of the University administration. The students were protesting the Gaza genocide and calling for a ceasefire, as well as for the university to divest from companies that "facilitate the 'Israeli military occupation' in Gaza."

A few weeks later, the campus was rocked by the shooting of an undergraduate student from Palestine, Hisham Awartani, while he was visiting family in Vermont. In the wake of the shooting, in early December 2023, forty-one more students held a sit-in with similar demands which resulted in additional arrests by the University. The following semester, as the administration continued to press charges on the forty-one sit-in participants, nineteen students participated in an eight-day hunger strike preceding a corporation meeting with the demand to present their case to corporation members.

During the wave of pro-Palestine university protests in the spring of that year, Brown University students erected a "Gaza Solidarity Encampment" on the University's Main Green, which involved over 80 students and stood for a week before negotiations between the protestors and the Brown administration brought the standoff to a close, resulting in a large number of students being put on probations of various lengths.

In October 2024, the corporation held an early vote on the issue of divestment, rejecting the proposal in an 8-2 vote. Following a University investigation into student protests resulting from this decision, the University suspended the Students for Justice in Palestine chapter at Brown.

== Athletics ==
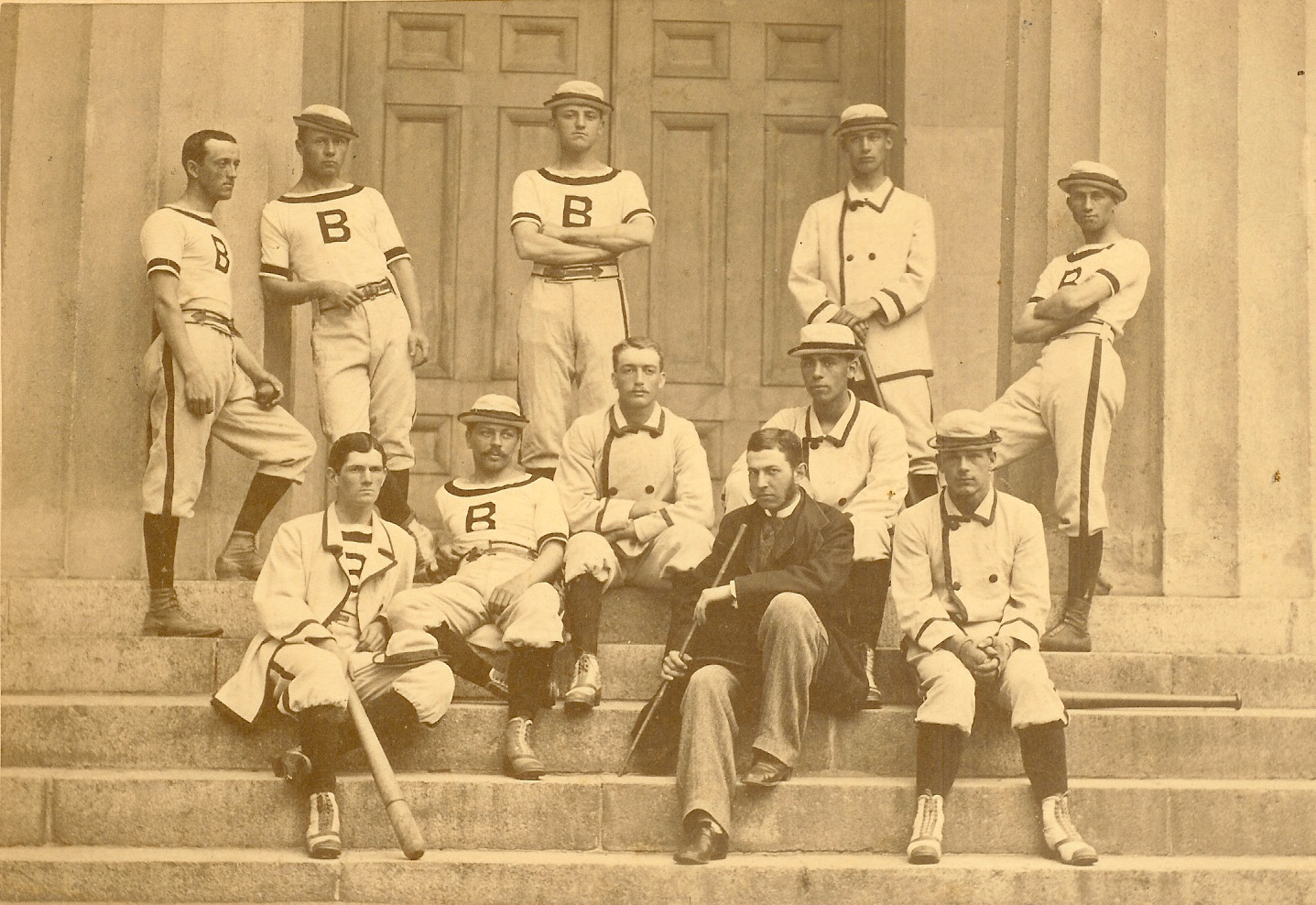
The 1879 Brown baseball varsity, with W.E. White seated second from right. White's appearance in an 1879 major league game may be the first person of color to play professional baseball, 68 years before Jackie Robinson.

Brown is a member of the Ivy League athletic conference, which is categorized as a Division I (top-level) conference of the National Collegiate Athletic Association (NCAA).

The Brown Bears has one of the largest university sports programs in the United States, sponsoring 32 varsity intercollegiate teams. Brown's athletic program is one of the U.S. News & World Report top 20—the "College Sports Honor Roll"—based on breadth of the program and athletes' graduation rates.

Athletic facilities

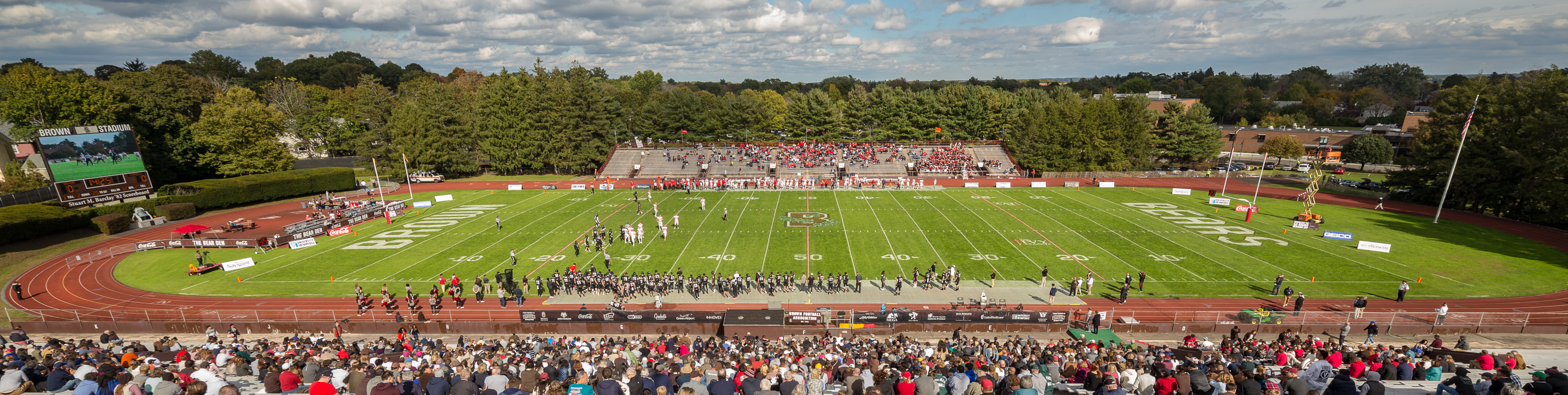
Brown Stadium (opened 1925)

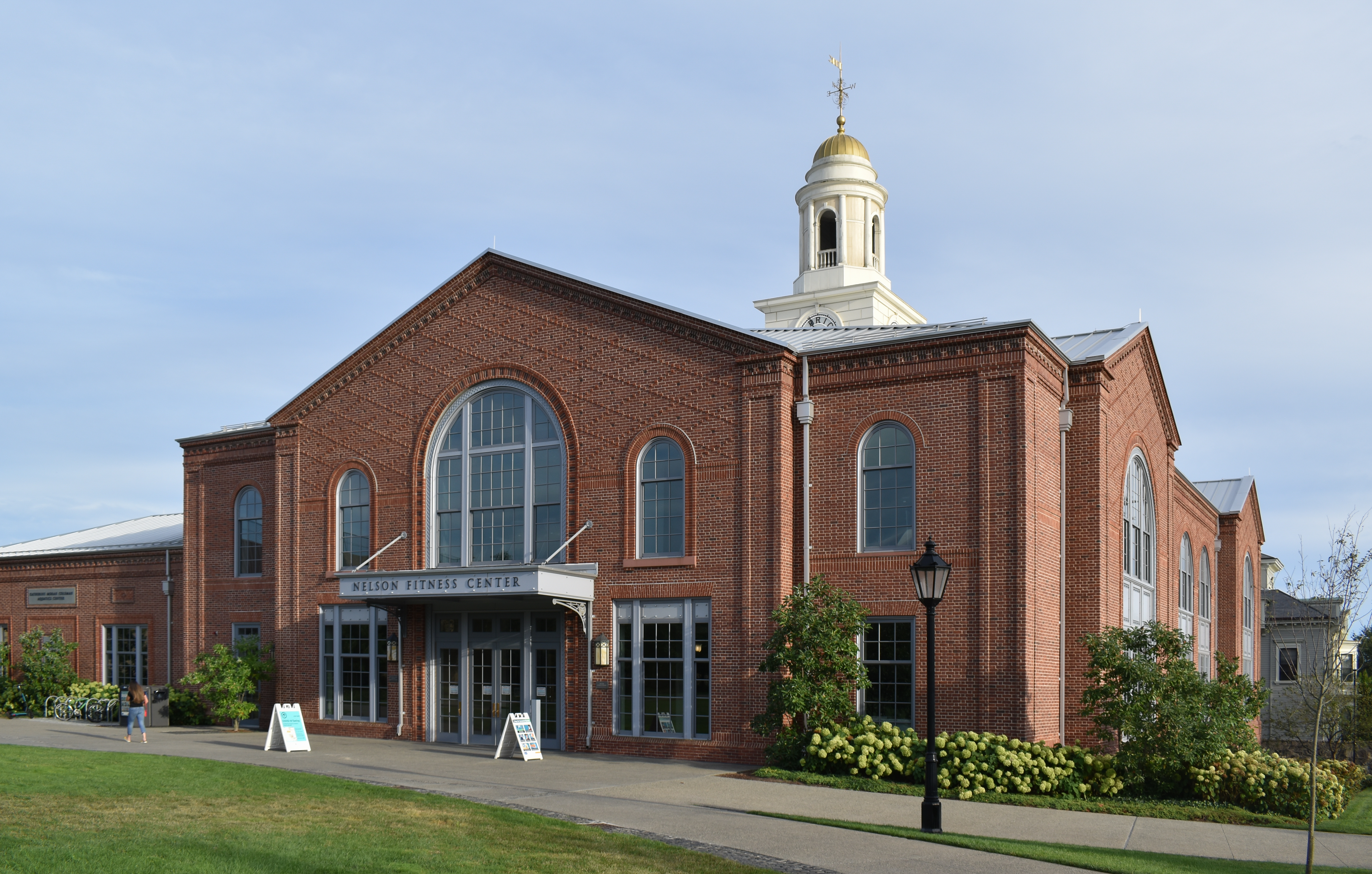
Nelson Fitness Center (opened 2012)

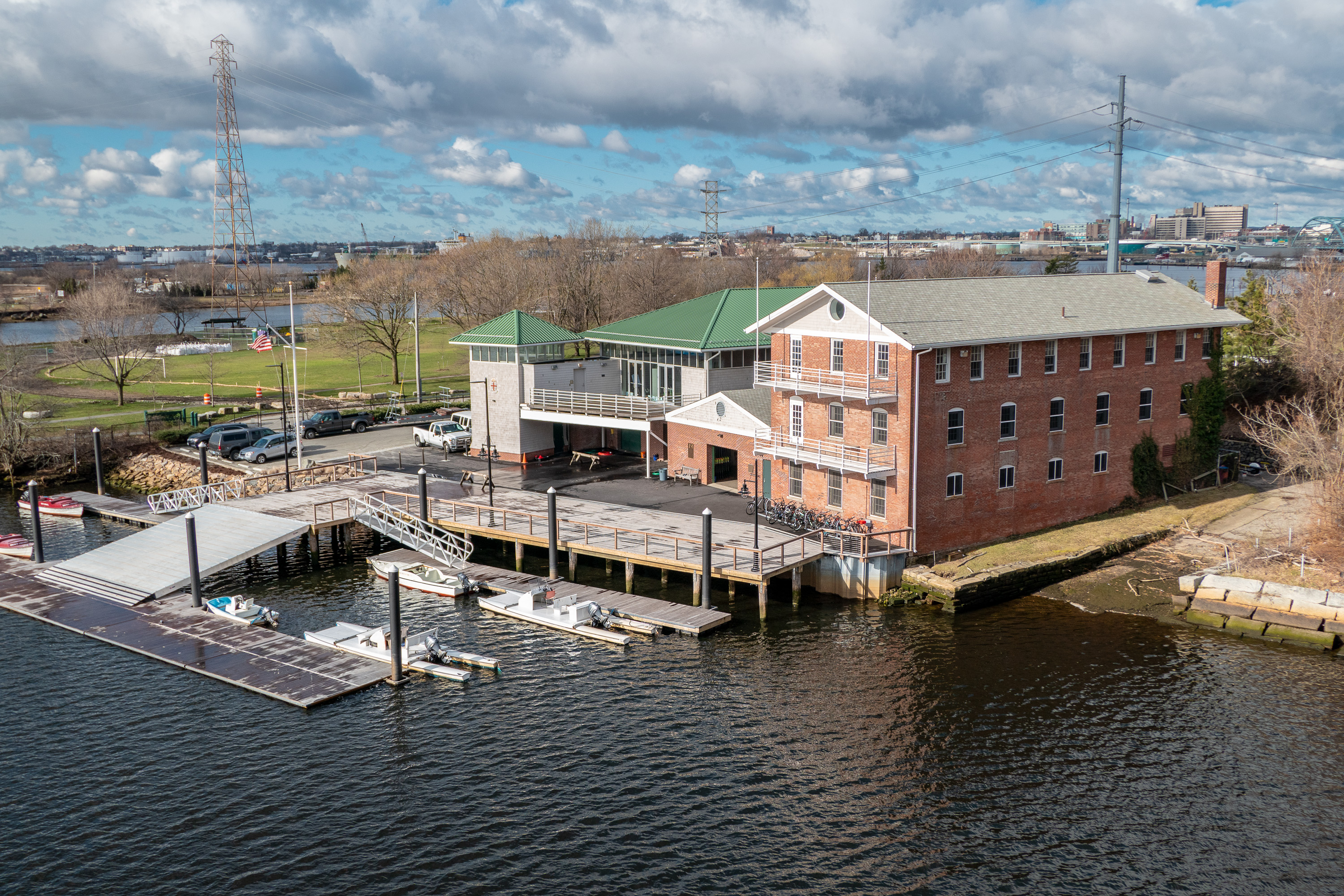
Marston Boathouse, on the Seekonk River

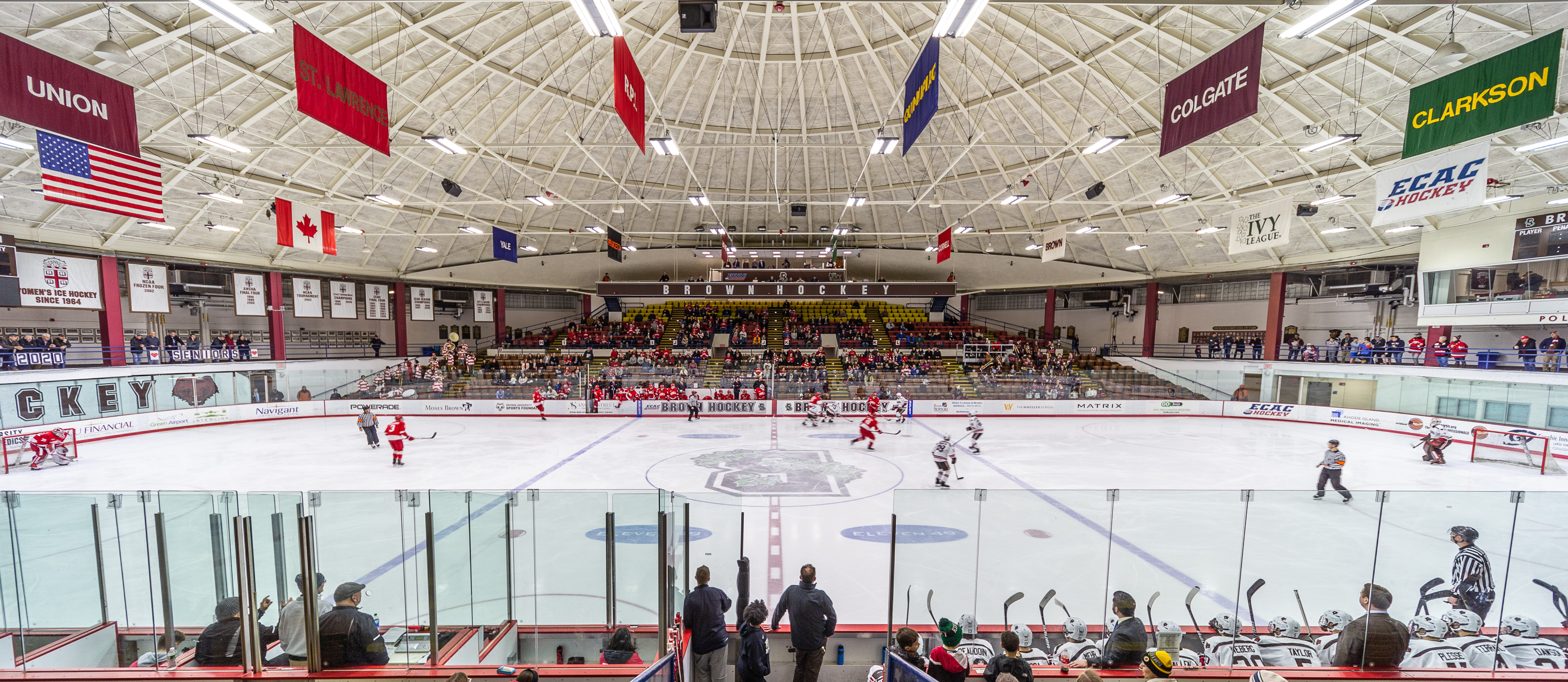
Meehan Auditorium (opened 1961)

Brown's newest varsity teams are men’s and women’s squash and golf, promoted back to varsity from club-sport status in 2026. Brown women's rowing has won seven national titles between 1999 and 2011. Brown men's rowing perennially finishes in the top 5 in the nation, most recently winning silver, bronze, and silver in the national championship races of 2012, 2013, and 2014. The men's and women's crews have also won championship trophies at the Henley Royal Regatta and the Henley Women's Regatta. Brown's men's soccer is consistently ranked in the top 20 and has won 18 Ivy League titles overall; recent soccer graduates play professionally in Major League Soccer and overseas.

Brown football, under its most successful coach historically, Phil Estes, won Ivy League championships in 1999, 2005, and 2008. high-profile alumni of the football program include former Houston Texans head coach Bill O'Brien; former Penn State football coach Joe Paterno, Heisman Trophy namesake John W. Heisman, and Pollard Award namesake Fritz Pollard.

Brown women's gymnastics won the Ivy League tournament in 2013 and 2014. The Brown women's sailing team has won five national championships, most recently in 2019, while the coed sailing team won three national championships in 1942, 1948, and 2026. Both teams are consistency ranked in the top 10 in the nation.

The first intercollegiate ice hockey game in America was played between Brown and Harvard on January 19, 1898. The first university rowing regatta larger than a dual-meet was held between Brown, Harvard, and Yale at Lake Quinsigamond in Massachusetts on July 26, 1859.

Brown also supports competitive intercollegiate club sports, including ultimate frisbee. The men's ultimate team, Brownian Motion, has won four national championships, in 2000, 2005, 2019 and 2024. The Brown men’s rugby team is consistently one of the best in the nation. Originally formed in 1960, it has won Division 1 National Championships in 2022 and 2024. They have also won 8 Ivy League Championships since 2020.

== Notable people ==
=== Faculty ===
Among Brown's past and present faculty are eight Nobel Laureates: Lars Onsager (Chemistry, 1968), Leon Cooper (Physics, 1972), George Snell (Physiology or Medicine, 1980), George Stigler (Economic Sciences, 1982), Henry David Abraham (Peace, 1985), Vernon L. Smith (Economic Sciences, 2002), J. Michael Kosterlitz (Physics, 2016), and Peter Howitt (Economic Sciences, 2025).

Notable past and present faculty include biologists Anne Fausto-Sterling (Ph.D. 1970) and Kenneth R. Miller (Sc.B. 1970); computer scientists Robert Sedgewick and Andries van Dam; economists Hyman Minsky, Glenn Loury, George Stigler, Mark Blyth, and Emily Oster; historians Gordon S. Wood and Joan Wallach Scott; mathematicians David Gale, David Mumford, Mary Cartwright, and Solomon Lefschetz; physicists Sylvester James Gates and Gerald Guralnik. Faculty in literature include Chinua Achebe, Ama Ata Aidoo, and Carlos Fuentes. Among Brown's faculty and fellows in political science, and public affairs are the former prime minister of Italy and former EU chief, Romano Prodi; former president of Brazil, Fernando Cardoso; former president of Chile, Ricardo Lagos; and son of Soviet Premier Nikita Khrushchev, Sergei Khrushchev. Other faculty include philosopher Martha Nussbaum, author Ibram X. Kendi, and public health doctor Ashish Jha.

=== In popular culture ===
Mentions of Brown in fiction and popular culture include the following. Family Guy character Brian Griffin is a Brown alumnus. The O.C.'s main character Seth Cohen is denied acceptance to Brown while his girlfriend Summer Roberts is accepted.

== See also ==
- List of Brown University statues
- Brown University alma mater
- Josiah S. Carberry
