= Steven Holl =

American architect

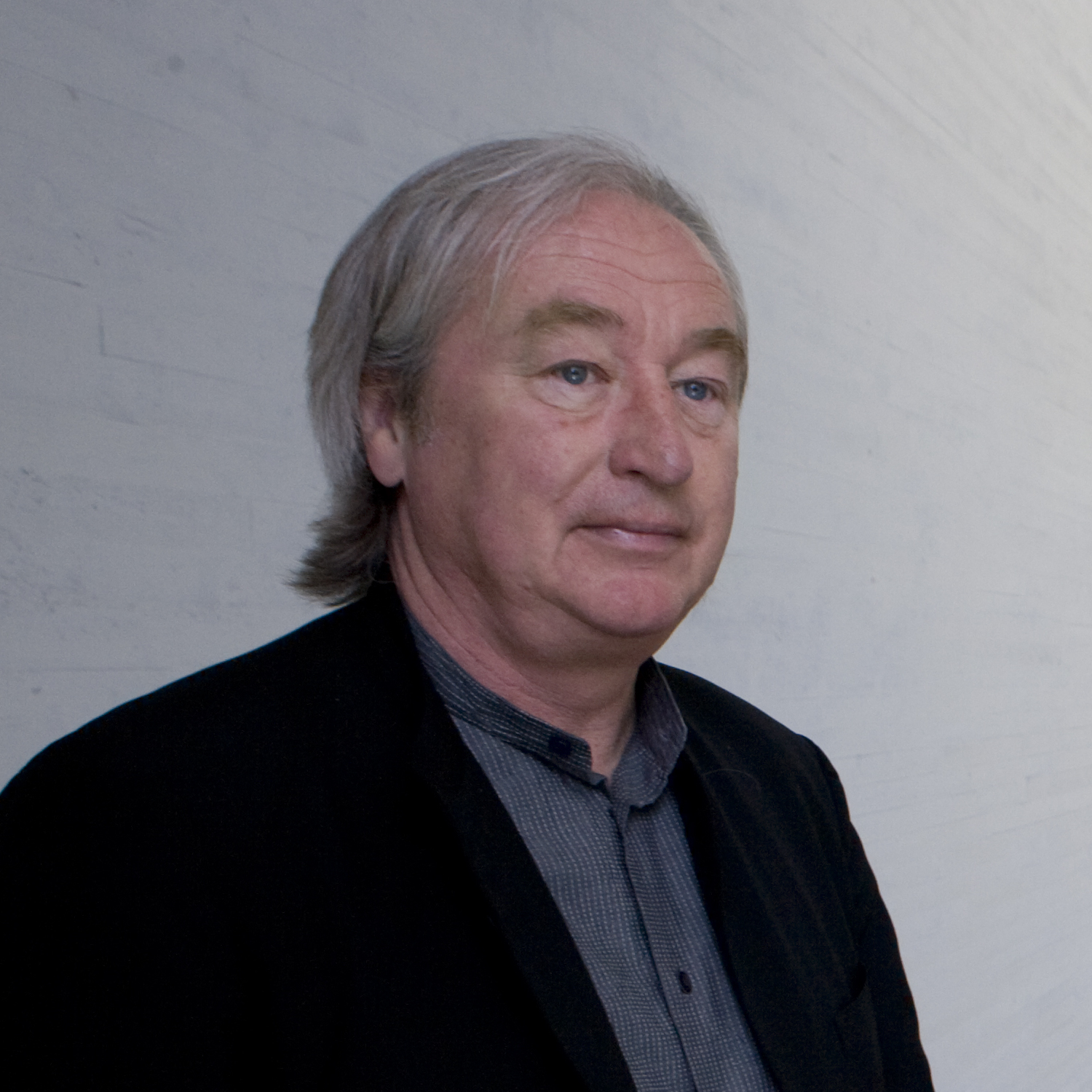
- Steven Holl in Helsinki, Finland in 2008
- Born: December 9, 1947 (age 78); Bremerton, Washington
- Education: University of Washington (BA); Architectural Association School of Architecture
- Occupation: Architect
- Spouse: Dimitra Tsachrelia Holl
- Children: Io Holl, Thevos Holl
- Awards: Alvar Aalto Medal (1998); BBVA Foundation Frontiers of Knowledge Award (2008); AIA Gold Medal (2012); Praemium Imperiale (2014); The Daylight Award (2016)
- Practice: Steven Holl Architects
- Buildings: Kiasma Contemporary Art Museum, Helsinki, Nelson-Atkins Museum of Art, Kansas City, Linked Hybrid, Beijing, Knut Hamsun Center, Hamarøy, Norway, [Kinder Building, Museum of Fine Arts Houston], Houston, Texas, [Rubenstein Commons, Institute for Advanced Study (IAS)], Princeton, New Jersey

Steven Holl (born December 9, 1947) is a New York–based American architect and watercolorist.

His work includes the 2022 Rubenstein Commons at the Institute for Advanced Study; the 2020 Campus expansion of the Museum of Fine Arts Houston including the Nancy and Rich Kinder Building and Glassell School of Art; the 2019 REACH expansion of the John F. Kennedy Center for the Performing Arts; the 2019 Hunters Point Library in Queens, New York; the 2007 Bloch Building addition to the Nelson-Atkins Museum of Art in Kansas City, Missouri; and the 2009 Linked Hybrid mixed-use complex in Beijing, China.

== Career ==
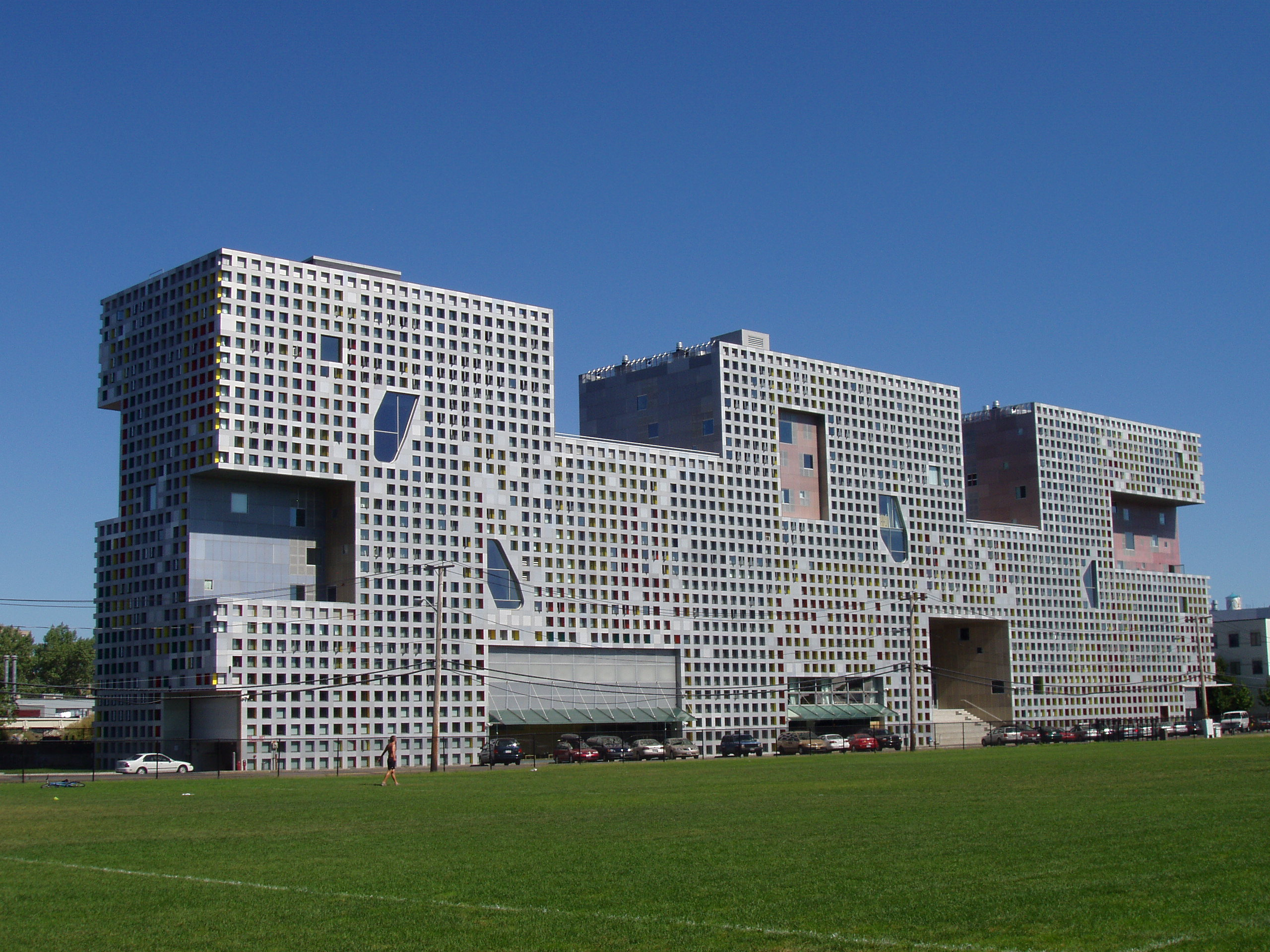
Steven Holl's design for Simmons Hall of MIT won the Harleston Parker Medal in 2004.

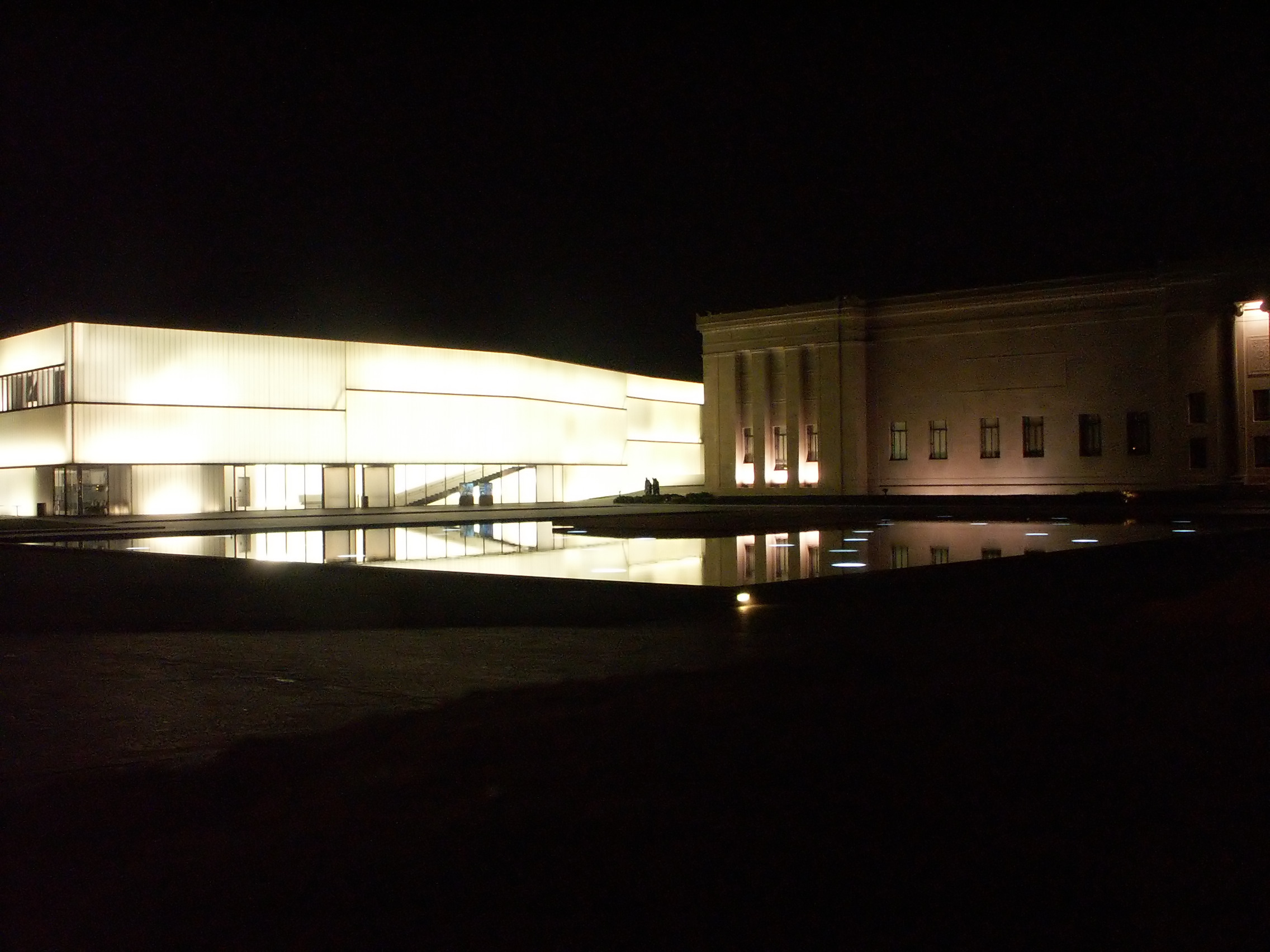
Bloch Addition to the Nelson-Atkins Museum of Art, 2007

=== Family and education ===
Holl was born on December 9, 1947, and grew up in Bremerton and Manchester, Washington. He is the son of Myron Holl of Washington state and Helen Mae Holl of Alabama. He has described his father as "full blooded Norwegian". Holl received a Bachelor of Arts from the University of Washington (department of architecture) in 1971, pursuing architectural studies in Rome in 1970 under Astra Zarina.

1960s and early '70s, he landed a job at Lawrence Halprin's office before heading to London's Architectural Association. "He was doing private projects, trying to be an architect, looking for work," recalls bookseller-publisher William Stout, who shared an apartment with Holl on Telegraph Hill. Holl also was the first (very part-time) employee at Stout's architectural bookshop in Jackson Square.

In 1976, he did postgraduate work at the Architectural Association in London, where he came in contact with architects such as Rem Koolhaas, Leon Krier, Charles Jenks, Elia Zenghelis, Zaha Hadid, and Bernard Tschumi.

=== Recognition and awards ===
In 1998, Holl was awarded the Alvar Aalto Medal. In 2000, Holl was elected to the American Academy of Arts and Letters. In July 2001, Time magazine described Holl as ‘America’s Best Architect,’ citing his ‘buildings that satisfy the spirit as well as the eye.’ Other awards and distinctions include the best architectural design in New York for The Pace Collection showroom in 1986 from the American Institute of Architects, the New York American Institute of Architects Medal of Honor (1997), the French Grande Médaille d’Or (2001), the Smithsonian Institution's Cooper-Hewitt National Design Award in Architecture (2002), Honorary Fellow of the Royal Institute of British Architects (2003), the Arnold W. Brunner Prize in Architecture from the American Academy of Arts and Letters, and the 2008 BBVA Foundation Frontiers of Knowledge Award in the Arts category. In 2007, Steven Holl Architects received the AIA Institute Honor Award and the AIA New York Chapter Architecture Merit Award for Art Building West for the School of Art and Art History (University of Iowa, Iowa City). The Higgins Hall Insertion at Pratt Institute (Brooklyn, New York) and the New Residence at the Swiss Embassy both received the AIA New York Chapter Architecture Honor Award in 2007. In 2010, Herning Museum of Contemporary Art, (Herning, Denmark) was awarded the RIBA International Award. The Horizontal Skyscraper-Vanke Center received the 2011 AIA Institute National Honor Award, as well as the AIA NY Honor Award. In 2011, he was named a Senior Fellow of the Design Futures Council., and Holl was named the 2012 AIA Gold Medal winner. In 2014, Holl was awarded the Praemium Imperiale Prize for Architecture. In 2016, Holl received The Daylight Award in Architecture, presented by the foundations VILLUM FONDEN, VELUX FONDEN and VELUX STIFTUNG. In 2017, Holl was awarded the Distinguished Alumni Award from the University of Washington. Steven Holl Architects was awarded the AIA New York President’s Award in 2019. In 2022, the Chapel of St. Ignatius was awarded the Twenty-Five Year Award by the American Institute of Architects.

=== Teaching ===
Holl is a tenured professor at Columbia University, where he has taught since 1981 with Dimitra Tsachrelia. He co-teaches a seminar on the relationship between music and architecture at Columbia University.

=== 'T' Space ===
In 2010, Holl founded 'T' Space, a multidisciplinary arts organization in Rhinebeck, New York. The organization runs a summer exhibition series and an emerging architects summer residency. The 'T' Space Synthesis of the Arts Series presents 2 to 3 exhibitions annually. As of 2019, it has exhibited architects José Oubrerie, Tatiana Bilbao, and Neil Denari, as well as artists such as Ai Weiwei, Pat Steir, and Brice Marden. In 2017, 'T' Space began a summertime residency program for young architects and artists. Program participants work on site-specific architectural concepts and attend lectures, field visits, and critiques. In addition to its arts and educational programming,'T' Space maintains a publication program and a 30-acre nature reserve with outdoor installations. In 2019, construction was completed on 'T' Space's architectural archive and research library, which houses Holl's watercolors, models and drawings from his practice.

=== Public events and lectures ===
- 2025 – Steven Holl in Conversation with Peter Eisenman: Cornell AAP Island Editions.
- 2025 – Keynote lecture titled “Imaginary Causes in Architecture” during the Mextrópoli Architecture Festival in Mexico City.
- 2024 – "Gazes on Material: the truth of making between architecture and art", public event at the Roman Aquarium (Casa dell'Architettura), Rome. Holl delivered the lecture "Art Drives Architecture"; Mino Caggiula also spoke and was described by Domus as a student of Holl. The event was organized by Diasen and moderated by Walter Mariotti.
- 2024 – Conversation with Toshiko Mori at the Harvard Graduate School of Design, moderated by Walter Mariotti (Domus).
- 2024 – "Color, Light, and Time", public lecture at the Weitzman School of Design (University of Pennsylvania), part of the Abend Family/EwingCole series (recording available).
- 2023 – Public lecture at Rensselaer Polytechnic Institute (School of Architecture), "Questions of Perception" (EMPAC Concert Hall).
- 2017 – AIA UK / RIBA Keynote Lecture, London (12 December).
- 2016 – "Architecture in Time", lecture at the Fay Jones School of Architecture and Design, University of Arkansas.
- 2015 – "Poetry of Structure", Ahmad Tehrani Mini‑Symposium, MIT (Long Lounge).
- 2012 – Windmueller Artist Lecture, Virginia Commonwealth University (Richmond).
- 2012 – "Discussions in Architecture": in conversation with Preston Scott Cohen, Harvard Graduate School of Design (recording).
- 2010 – RIBA Charles Jencks Award presentation followed by a public lecture at RIBA, chaired by Charles Jencks (30 November).

=== Exhibitions ===
- Drawing as Thought, 2025, curated by Kristin Feireiss, Museum for Architectural Drawing, Berlin.
- Making Architecture, 2018–2025, on view at: The Dorsky Museum, New York, US (2025); Museum of Fine Arts, Houston, US (2025); Bellevue Arts Museum (2020); Nanjing Sifang Art Museum (2019); the Urban Network Office (UNO) and FU Space, Shanghai (2019); and ARCHI-DEPOT Museum, Tokyo (2019).
- Idea and Phenomena. Steven Holl, 2002-2021, Architekturzentrum Wien, Vienna, Austria. (2002); Schwedisches Architekturmuseum Stockholm, Sweden (2003); Garanti Gallery, Istanbul, Turkey (2003); The Roca Beijing Gallery, Beijing (2021);
- Parallax, 2000, Max Protetch Gallery, New York, US.
- The Architect's Sketchbook: Current Practice, 1992, The Canadian Centre for Architecture, Montréal, Canada.
- Emilio Ambasz/Steven Holl: Architecture, 1989, MoMA, New York, US.

== Works ==
=== Early works ===
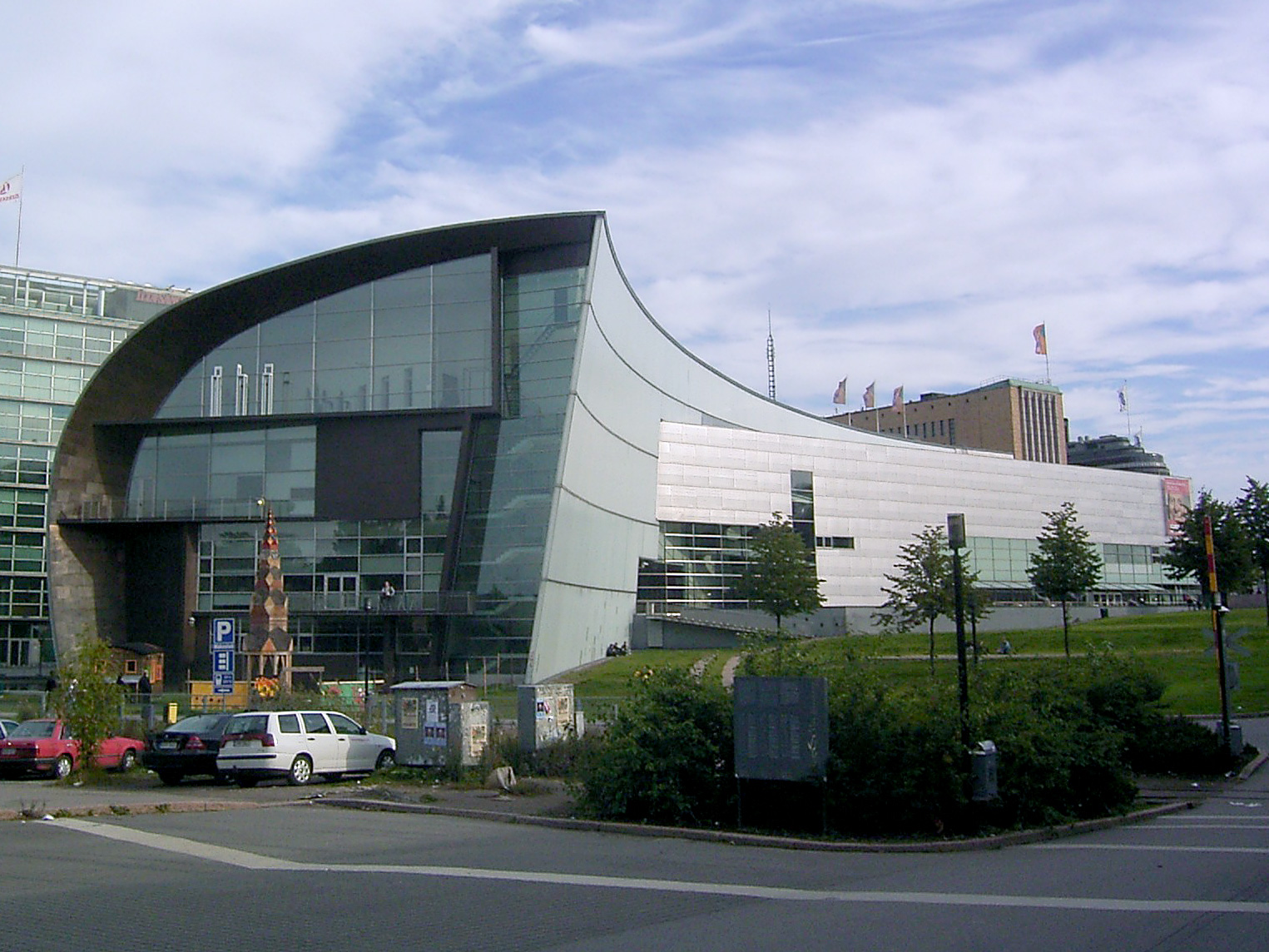
Kiasma, Helsinki, 1993-1998

During his early years in New York, Holl, along with architect and book collector William Stout, launched the experimental publication series Pamphlet Architecture. Pamphlet Architecture became a venue for experimental architectural work and featured authors such as Lebbeus Woods, Zaha Hadid, and Alberto Sartoris.

Holl received one of three first prizes in the 1988 invited competition for an addition to Berlin's Amerika-Gedenkbibliothek (American Memorial Library). The scheme was not realized following German reunification. In 1989 the Museum of Modern Art in New York presented the exhibition Emilio Ambasz/Steven Holl: Architecture (February 9–April 4). MoMA also holds models and drawings by Steven Holl Architects in its collection. In the 1992 international competition for Helsinki's new museum of contemporary art, Holl's proposal Chiasma was selected as the winner and the museum, named Kiasma, opened to the public in 1998. The name Kiasma derives from the Greek chiasma, meaning "crossing".

Holl designed the Chapel of St. Ignatius (built 1994–1997), a Jesuit chapel at Seattle University. The building is sited in the center of a former street and elongates the plan to create new campus quadrangles to the north, west and south, with a future quadrangle planned to the east. In 1997, the plan of the chapel won a design award in the American Institute of Architects of New York. According to Holl, the chapel’s concept reflects St. Ignatius’s vision of the ‘inner spiritual life, "seven bottles of light in a stone box", by creating seven volumes of different light. Each volume represents a different part of Jesuit Catholic worship, and has differently colored glass so that various parts of the building are marked out by colored light. Light sources are tinted both in this way and by indirect reflection from painted surfaces, and each is paired with its complementary color. In 2022, the Chapel of St. Ignatius received the AIA Twenty-five Year Award.

== Selected Projects ==
Work	Location	Completed
Hybrid Building	Seaside, Florida	1988
Void Space/Hinge Space Housing, Nexus World	Fukuoka, Japan	1991
Stretto House	Dallas, Texas	1991
Storefront for Art and Architecture	New York, New York	1993
Cranbrook Institute of Science	Bloomfield Hills, Michigan	1998
Chapel of St. Ignatius at Seattle University	Seattle, Washington	1997
Kiasma, Museum of Contemporary Art	Helsinki, Finland	1998
Sarphatistraat Offices	Amsterdam, Netherlands	2000
Bellevue Arts Museum	Bellevue, Washington	2001
Simmons Hall, Massachusetts Institute of Technology	Cambridge, Massachusetts	2002
Linked Hybrid	Beijing, China	2009
Knut Hamsun Centre (Hamsunsenteret)	Nordland, Norway	2009
Herning Museum of Contemporary Art	Herning, Denmark	2009
Cite de l'Ocean et du Surf, in collaboration with Solange Fabiao	Biarritz, France	2011
Daeyang Gallery and House	Seoul, South Korea	2012
Campbell Sports Center at Columbia University	New York, New York	2013
Maggie's Centres Barts	London, United Kingdom	2017
Student Performing Arts Center, University of Pennsylvania	Philadelphia, Pennsylvania	Under Construction

== Selected publications ==
=== By Steven Holl ===
- Steven Holl: Inspiration and Process in Architecture, Princeton Architectural Press, New York, 2020.
- Compression, Princeton Architectural Press, New York, 2019.
- Seven Houses: Luminist Architecture, Rizzoli International Publishers, 2018.
- Color Light Time, Lars Müller Publishers, 2012.
- Scale, Lars Müller Publishers, 2012.
- Urbanisms: Working with Doubt, Princeton Architectural Press, 2009.
- House - Black Swan Theory, Princeton Architectural Press, 2007.
- Questions of Perception: Phenomenology of Architecture, William Stout Books, 2007.
- Idea and Phenomena, Lars Müller Publishers, 2002.
- Written in Water, 2002, Lars Müller Publishers
- Parallax, Princeton Architectural Press, New York, 2000.
- Pamphlet Architecture 1-10, Princeton Architectural Press, New York, 1998.
- Intertwining, Princeton Architectural Press, New York, 1996.
- Pamphlet Architecture 13: Edge of a City, Princeton Architectural Press, New York, 1996.
- Steven Holl: Educating our Perception, in “Magic Materials II”, Daidalos, August 1995.
- Anchoring, Princeton Architectural Press, New York, 1989.
- Pamphlet Architecture 5: Alphabetical City, Princeton Architectural Press, New York, 1980.
- Pamphlet Architecture 9: Rural and Urban House Types, Princeton Architectural Press, New York, 1983.
- Along with Pallasmaa and Alberto Perez-Gomez, Holl wrote essays for a 1994 special issue of the Japanese architectural journal A+U under the title "Questions of Perception: Phenomenology of Architecture." The publication was reissued as a book in 2006.

==== Monographs ====
- Steven Holl: Drawing as Thought by Kristin Feireiss, Tchoban Foundation, Museum für Architekturzeichnung, 2025.
- Lake of the Mind: A Conversation with Steven Holl, LetteraVentidue, Diana Carta, 2018.
- Steven Holl, Robert McCarter, Phaidon, New York, 2015.
