= Chris McVoy =

American architect based in New York

- Born: 1964 (age 61–62); Ankara, Turkey
- Education: Columbia University; University of Virginia
- Occupation: Architect
- Spouse: Beth O'Neill
- Awards: AIANY, Society of American Registered Architects, MacDowell
- Practice: O'Neill McVoy Architects
- Buildings: with Steven Holl Architects: Bloch Building (Nelson-Atkins Museum of Art); The REACH (Kennedy Center); Kinder Building (Museum of Fine Arts, Houston) with O'Neill McVoy Architects: Church Hill Community Hybrid
- Projects: with O'Neill McVoy Architects: Bronx Children's Museum
- Website: O'Neill McVoy Architects

Chris McVoy (born 1964) is an American architect based in New York. He is a design partner at O'Neill McVoy Architects, the architectural firm in Brooklyn he co-founded with architect Beth O'Neill. For over two decades, he was senior partner at Steven Holl Architects and is partner emeritus.

McVoy's work has focused on the design and construction of cultural and educational buildings, as well as the integration of new structures into sites of cultural and historical significance. Among the projects for which he served as partner in charge with Steven Holl Architects are the Nelson-Atkins Museum of Art Bloch Building (2007), the University of Iowa Visual Arts Building (2016), the REACH expansion of the Kennedy Center for the Performing Arts (2019), and the Museum of Fine Arts Houston campus extension (2020). His projects at O'Neill McVoy include the Bronx Children's Museum (2022) and Church Hill Community Hybrid (2021). McVoy's work has received awards from the American Institute of Architects New York (AIANY), the Society of American Registered Architects (SARA), Urban Land Institute, and MacDowell.

== Education and career ==
McVoy was born in Ankara, Turkey in 1964. He earned a BA in architecture from the University of Virginia in 1986 and a Master of Architecture from Columbia University in 1992.

After graduating, he worked with Tod Williams Billie Tsien Architects for a year. In 1994, he joined Steven Holl Architects (SHA) and was named the firm's first partner in 2000. He served as senior partner until becoming partner emeritus in 2024. Concurrent to his work at SHA, McVoy and architect Beth O'Neill co-founded O'Neill McVoy Architects in 2012, where he has served as design partner. Based in Brooklyn, the firm operates a multi-scale practice that includes institutional, commercial and residential buildings and interior build-outs.

McVoy has been a lecturer at The New School / Parsons School of Design since 2023. He has been a visiting critic at Andes University (Colombia), Columbia University, Pratt Institute, University of Michigan, Harvard University and Yale University.

== Work ==
McVoy is known for his inventive and integrative architectural style, used primarily in the education and arts sectors. Commentators note his connection-based approach to architecture, regarding building design as a means to link users with nature, with community and with their own purpose and senses. His projects have received critical attention for their fusion of aspirational design elements with pragmatic ones. Esthetically, these works are noted for their open, fluid layouts and symbolically framed views, as well as their innovative use of raw materials and light.

McVoy's development process is considered inclusive, incorporating extensive consideration of local impact and internal project goals. His projects are often described as community-centric, both for their integrative design and their participatory development approach. He deploys design elements such as permeability and color to establish continuity with surrounding environs and uses input from local stakeholders—including children—to guide the direction and execution of projects.

=== Projects at Steven Holl Architects ===
Steven Holl Architects (SHA) is widely known for its work in creating large-scale art centers. McVoy acted as partner-in-charge and co-designer with Steven Holl on many of these projects, including the Nelson-Atkins Museum Bloch Building, the University of Iowa Visual Arts Building, and MFA Houston's Kinder Building. The architects developed a reputation for winning commissions with imaginative, unorthodox proposals.

In 2007, Kansas City's Nelson-Atkins Museum opened its Bloch Building, for which McVoy co-designed and served as partner in charge while at SHA. The building received widespread critical attention for its structural use of glass and inventive integration with the museum's landscape, situating parts of the construction beneath new rooftop gardens that blended into the museum's existing sculpture park. Architecture historian Barry Bergdoll called the work "transformative," stating that "Holl, McVoy and their associates bypassed a literal interpretation of the brief…to reimagine the very relationship of the institution's functions to the landscape and the adjacent city fabric."

In 2016, McVoy co-designed and was partner in charge of the University of Iowa's Visual Arts Building (VAB). The hilltop structure provides 126,000 square feet of program space for the university's art department. The building was designed with loftlike interiors and an exterior of perforated stainless steel panels that modulate light and reduce solar gain. Curvilinear carve-outs in structure bring daylight deep into the building and create a staircase-wrapped atrium that provides ventilation and anchors movement. The designers built lounge areas into circulation routes to encourage interaction and collaboration. Despite the high-energy needs associated with art production facilities, the VAB's energy-conscious design earned LEED Gold status and a $550,000 incentive for its energy performance, projected to save the university $300,000 annually.

In the 2010s, the firm created a nearly 500,000 square foot expansion at the Museum of Fine Arts, Houston which included the Glassell School of Art (2018) and Kinder Museum Building (2020), together with underground passageways linking multiple buildings. The Glassell building houses studios, gallery spaces, an auditorium and a rooftop garden with amphitheater. The Kinder Museum offers 184,000 square feet of modern and contemporary art galleries with a film theater, restaurant, café and conference center. Its design centralizes natural light with a translucent glass tube façade together with a diffused-light roof treatment that emulates clouds. The roof and ribbon staircase are noted for their hidden-structure design which create a "floating" appearance. Critic Michael J. Lewis of the Wall Street Journal wrote: "The Kinder is a triumph. It is impressive by day or night, adroitly integrated into its site, and—best of all—designed with special consideration for the ease and comfort of its users."

In 2019, the firm inaugurated the REACH expansion of the Kennedy Center, for which McVoy served as partner in charge. The $250 million expansion features an iceberg-like construction that situates 72,000 square feet of interior space within and largely below nearly five acres of landscape. Three white pavilions overlook a manicured, artificial ground plane which together cover two levels of performance space as well as a parking garage. A porous entrance scheme, outdoor viewing area and studio mezzanines democratize access to the space. The project received critical attention for its pairing of inventive design and meaningful symbolism with high functional performance.

McVoy also saw the completion of three other arts structures at SHA—the Glasgow School of Art's Reid Building (2014), VCU Richmond's Institute for Contemporary Art (another LEED Gold building) and the Franklin & Marshall College Winter Arts Center (2019)—as well as the Campbell Sports Center at Columbia University (2013) and Hunters Point Community Library (2019).

=== Projects at O'Neill McVoy Architects ===
In 2021, O'Neill McVoy designed a four-story, multi-use building complex in Richmond's Church Hill North neighborhood, housing a culinary school together with affordable residential units and commercial space in a 50,000 square foot structure. Sited at the area's main intersection, the split-layout complex was conceived and planned by the firm—in collaboration with private investment, community members and local government—as a catalyst for addressing affordable food and housing challenges cited by local residents. Critic Edwin Slipek of Style Weekly described the building as "striking," noting that its "aggressively modern" use of poured concrete was tempered by rustication treatments that echo neighborhood brickwork and by the ample use of glass, which affords views to passersby of the kitchens and garden within. The project's community-centric approach drew attention as a potentially viable alternative to gentrification for effecting urban renewal.

In two youth-oriented projects, O'Neill McVoy created designs and interior build-outs that drew upon Swiss psychologist Jean Piaget's understanding of how children perceive space, emphasizing flow, sensory connection and the intentional use of color and light. The Bronx Children's Museum (2022) is a 15,676 square-foot, LEED Gold build-out within a 1920s-era historic building on the Harlem River near Yankee Stadium. The resulting museum features a series of topographically rich, themed play areas that flow from one to another in curvilinear fashion. Susan T. Rodriguez, of Architect Magazine, stated, "It's a wonderful place for children to move and flow through the spaces…an exuberant counterpoint to the historical industrial box." Nature is a central theme both conceptually and materially, with references to water integrated throughout and materials like oak heartwood floor tile providing an educational and tactile connection to the surrounding environment. The design made extensive, innovative use of cross-laminated timber (CLT) to create its modern, curved surfaces. The project was noted by critics for being the first use of curved CLT in the U.S.

For the interior of Language and Laughter Studio Preschool (2024), a French immersion preschool and language center in Brooklyn, the firm integrated the institution's learning philosophy—rooted in nature, art and psychology—with Piaget's theories and with architectural style elements from buildings by Le Corbusier and Luis Barragán. Visually, the design takes an energetic, light-and-color-based approach using continuous surfaces of polychromatic, curved interior partitions made of 100% recycled acrylic that shift in appearance, animated by silhouetted activity on the other side. The interior's materials further the emphasis on sensory phenomena and nature, with floors of rapidly renewable cork bark and soft, sky-blue acoustic ceiling panels bearing cloud-like shapes.

== Recognition ==
McVoy's work at O'Neill McVoy and Steven Holl Architects (SHA) has been recognized by architectural organizations and publications. The Bronx Children's Museum project received the Urban Land Institute New York Award for Excellence in Adaptive Reuse (2023) and design awards from The Architect's Newspaper, Architect Magazine and the American Institute of Architects, New York (AIANY). In 2022, the Church Hill North Community Hybrid project was recognized for design and social impact by The Architect's Newspaper and Architizer. An O'Neill McVoy residential project, Clinton Hill Courtyard House (2016), was honored by the Society of American Registered Architects (SARA) and The Architect's Newspaper.

Recognition for SHA projects for which McVoy served as partner in charge include: a Barrier-Free America Award from Paralyzed Veterans of America (2022) and an AIANY Design Honor Award (2020) for the Kennedy Center REACH; an American Institute of Architects New York State honor (2021) for the MFAH Kinder Building; AIANY (2020) and SARA (2019) honors for the Hunters Point Community Library; Architizer and AIANY (2018) honors for the Institute for Contemporary Art, VCU; and a "Best of the Year in Education" Interior Design Magazine (2016) award and AIANY honor for the University of Iowa Visual Arts Building.

In 2025, McVoy received a MacDowell fellowship for architecture-design.

== Selected projects ==
Work	Location	Firm	Completed
Nelson Atkins Museum of Art, Bloch Building	Kansas City, Missouri	Steven Holl Architects	2007
Campbell Sports Center at Columbia University	New York, New York	Steven Holl Architects	2013
Glasgow School of Art, Reid Building	Glasgow, Scotland	Steven Holl Architects	2014
University of Iowa Visual Arts Building	Iowa City, Iowa	Steven Holl Architects	2016
Maggie's Centres Barts	London, United Kingdom	Steven Holl Architects	2017
Virginia Commonwealth University, Institute for Contemporary Art	Richmond, Virginia	Steven Holl Architects	2018
Franklin & Marshall College, Winter Visual Arts Center	Lancaster, PA	Steven Holl Architects	2019
Kennedy Center, The REACH	Washington, District of Columbia	Steven Holl Architects	2019
Museum of Fine Arts, Houston, Kinder Building	Houston, Texas	Steven Holl Architects	2020
Church Hill Community Hybrid	Richmond, Virginia	O'Neill McVoy Architects	2021
Bronx Children's Museum	Bronx, New York	O'Neill McVoy Architects	2023
