= Caggiula =

Caggiula is a surname. Notable people with the surname include:

- Drake Caggiula (born 1994), Canadian ice hockey left wing
- Mino Caggiula (born 1977), Italian-Swiss architect
