= Campbell Sports Center =

Coordinates: 40.87166°N 73.91419°W

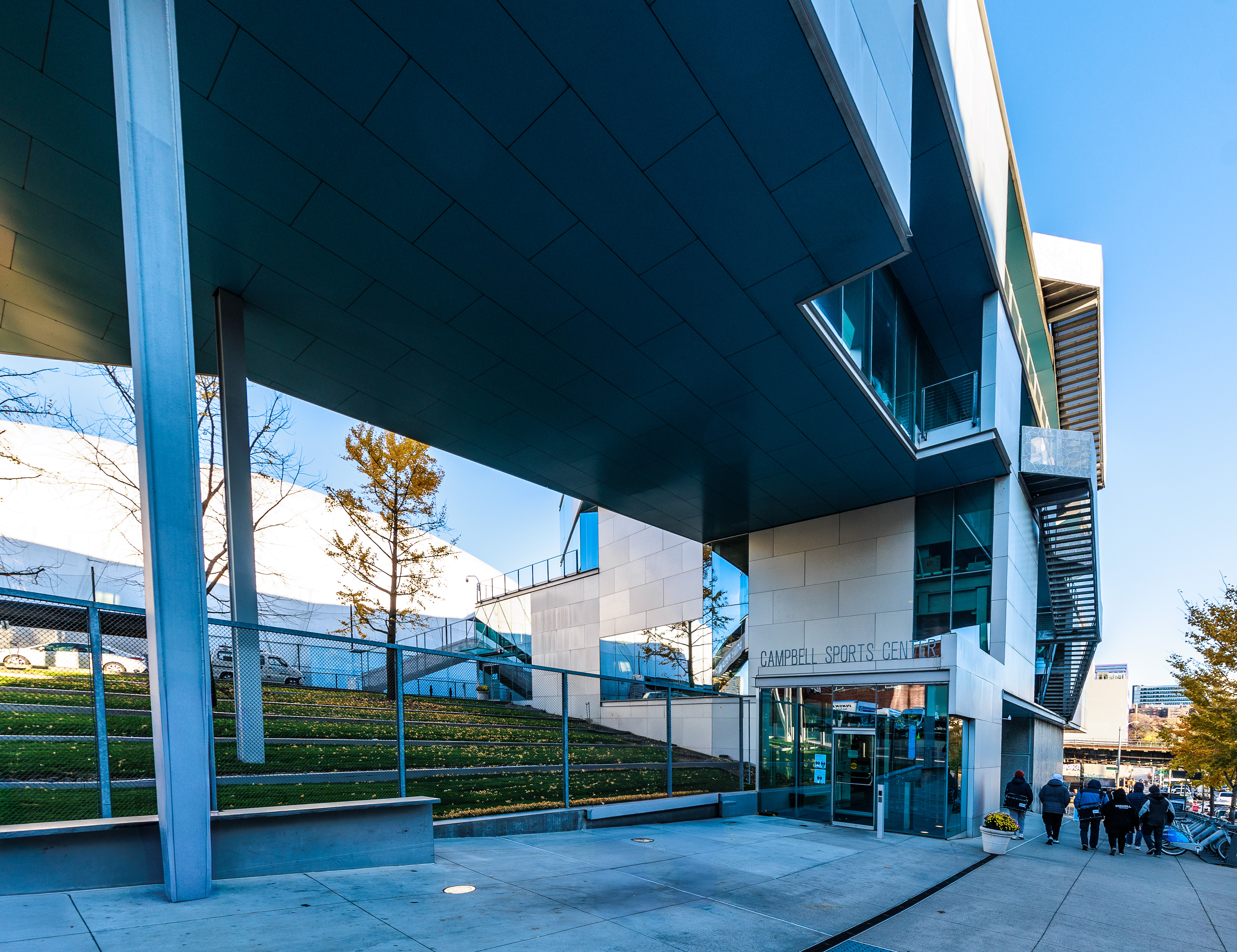
- Interactive map of the Campbell Sports Center area

General information
- Type: athletics facility
- Location: New York, New York
- Construction started: 2008
- Completed: 2012
- Opening: 2012

Technical details
- Floor count: 5
- Floor area: 48,000 sf

Design and construction
- Architect: Steven Holl Architects
- Structural engineer: Robert Silman Associates

The Campbell Sports Center, a Columbia University's Baker Field Athletics Complex, is designed by Steven Holl and senior partner Chris McVoy.

Sited on the corner of West 218th street and Broadway, the Campbell Sports Center aims to form an inviting new gateway to the Baker Athletics Complex, the primary athletics facility for the University’s outdoor sports program.

Steven Holl Architects' design concept for the building is based on "points on the ground, lines in space," which refers to field play diagrams used for football, soccer, baseball, and develops from point foundations on the sloping site. External stairs and terraces along the facade connect the building with the athletic fields below, giving views from the upper levels over the Baker Athletics Complex and Manhattan.

The five story, 48,000sf facility, which opened in Fall 2012, houses strength and conditioning spaces, offices for varsity sports, an auditorium, a hospitality suite and student-athlete study rooms.

== Reviews ==
Michael Kimmelman of The New York Times called it "not a beauty. But it is a tough, sophisticated and imaginative work of architecture for a devilish site."
