= Liu Haowei =

Chinese architect

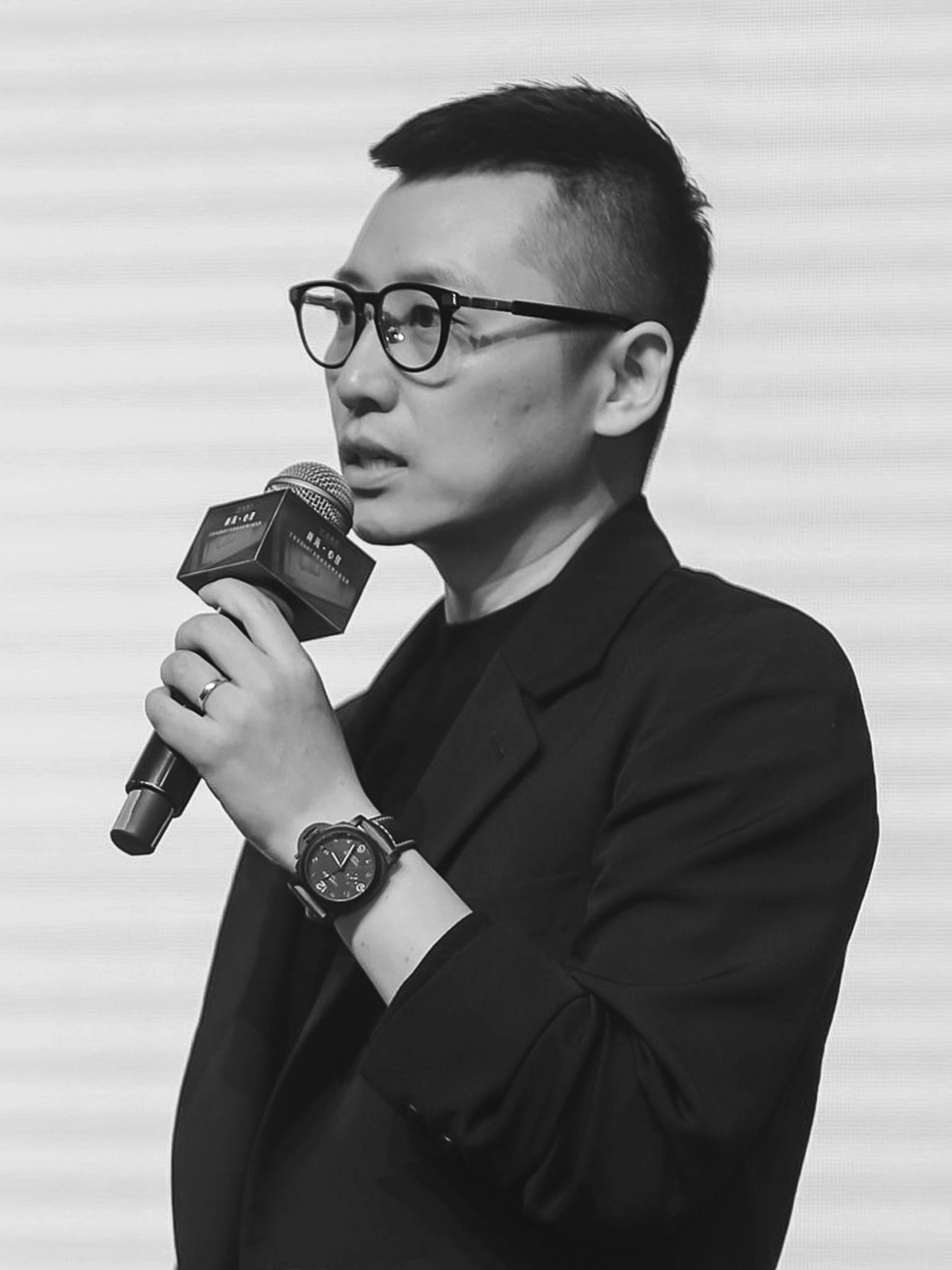
- Education: School of Architecture, Central Academy of Fine Arts
- Occupation: Architect
- Notable work: Beijing Collaborative Innovation Park Maldives Airport Economic Zone Development CAFA Qingdao Campus Planning Design Korea Samcheok Yisabu Dokdo Memorial Park Dali Nanzhao Folklore Island Planning and Architecture Design Weifang Art Center
- Website: www.caaarch.com

Liu Haowei (Chinese: 刘昊威.; pinyin: liú hàowēi), is a Chinese architect who graduated from the School of Architecture of the Central Academy of Fine Arts and is the founder of CAA architects. He is a member of the Architectural Art Committee of the China Artists Association, an expert consultant of the Art Design Institute of the Central Academy of Fine Arts, a guest professor of the Ningbo Research Institute of Zhejiang University, and the "Men of the Year" of the Chinese version of GQ magazine.

== Career ==
In 2006, Liu Haowei founded CAA architects, a Beijing-based international practice with offices in New York and Hong Kong, which has led projects of various types and scales.

In 2018, he founded CAA LAB, the research and development institution of CAA architects. In the same year, CAA LAB developed China's first design software based on AR technology -SZ (Chinese: 少装 shǎo zhuāng) App; in 2021, it launched the "Living on Mars" plan aimed at exploring and innovating the second residence of human beings; in 2022, it founded META CAALAB

== Design theory ==
Liu Haowei proposes the Neo-futuristic idea of Design for Tomorrow, while incorporating the spirit of Oriental Humanism for adaptive, resilient and future-oriented design. The strong intention is to combine architecture and art and to redefine how both disciplines can impact on the future city in an era of sustainability and digital technology.

== Signature projects ==
His representative projects include architecture projects, like West Mountain Innovation Valley-Beijing Collaborative Innovation Park, CAFA Qingdao Campus, Ocean's Heaven-Maldives Airport Economic Zone Development, Korea Samcheok Yisabu Dokdo Memorial Park, Dali Nanzhao Folklore Island, Weifang Art Center, Israel Day Care Center, Zhong Huan Plaza Art Center, New Element Photographic Academy, etc., interior projects, like CASA TALIA Restaurant, MQ Studio, SirTeen Club, Smile Angel Children's Hospital, Beijing-Shanghai High-Speed Railway, as well as art installations, like Crystal Space City, End of the World, and City Evolution.

== Awards and honors ==
Liu Haowei has won many global Awards, including the MUSE Design Award Platinum Prize, Architecture MasterPrize, WA Award, BUILD Award, IDA Award, Global Future Design Award, World Design Award, German Design Award, etc.
