= Philip Merrill Environmental Center =

Coordinates: 38.932658°N 76.462522°W

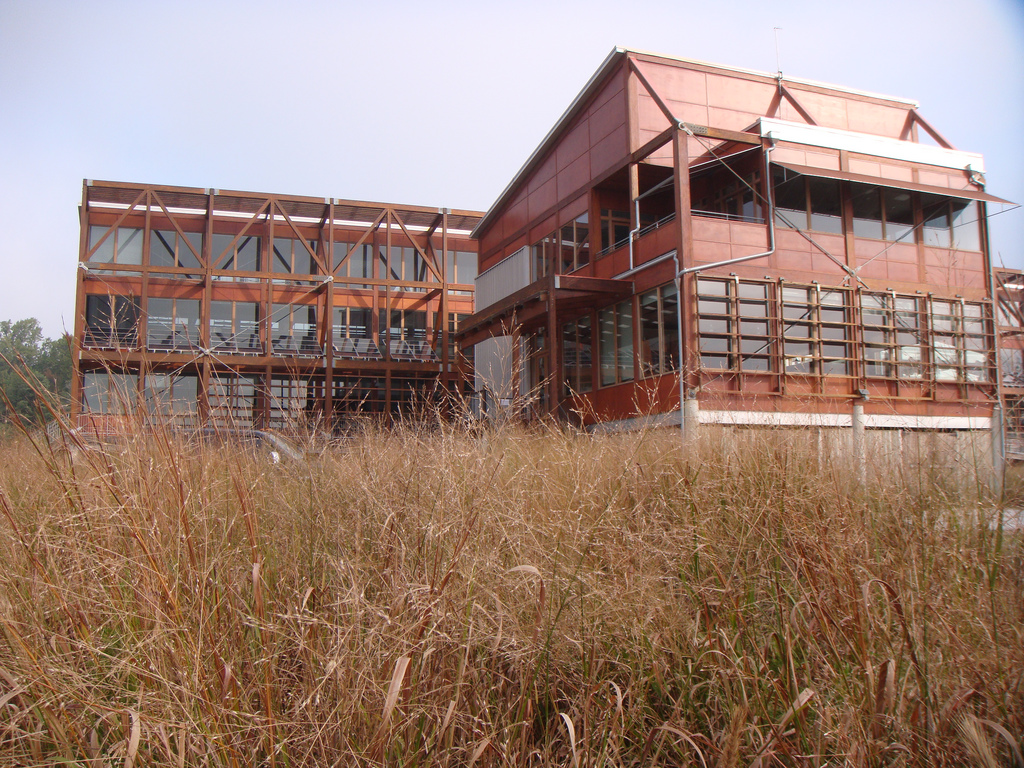
The Philip Merrill Environmental Center

The Philip Merrill Environmental Center is a Green building owned and operated by the Chesapeake Bay Foundation. Built in 2001, the Merrill Center is located in Annapolis, Maryland on the western shore of the Chesapeake Bay. The building serves as the headquarters office building for the CBF, but is also available to rent for business and social occasions.

The center is named for Philip Merrill, an American diplomat, publisher, banker, and philanthropist. The building was the first to receive the Leadership in Energy and Environmental Design (LEED) "Platinum" rating from the United States Green Building Council. This recognition confirmed that the center was the most environmentally friendly building in the country at the time when it was built. Items used in the building include recycled materials, renewable resources, and passive and active solar power and use.

The Philip Merrill Environmental Center won the 2026 Twenty-five Year Award from the American Institute of Architects.
