= International Design Awards =

- Native name: IDA
- Description: Recognizing design visionaries and emerging talent across multiple disciplines
- Country: United States (Los Angeles-based)
- Presented by: Farmani Group
- Website: https://www.idesignawards.com

The International Design Awards (IDA) are a group of awards that recognize, celebrate and promote design visionaries and emerging talent in architecture, interior, product, graphic and fashion design.

== Overview ==
The International Design Awards (IDA) exists to recognize, celebrate and promote exceptional design visionaries and discover emerging talent in Architecture, Interior, Product, Graphic and Fashion Design worldwide.

Each year, a selected jury of industry experts from each of the five IDA disciplines (Architecture, Fashion, Interior, Product and Graphic Design) determine one winning project from each discipline, as well as one emerging designer award from each discipline.

In addition to the annual "of the Year" honors, IDA also confers tiered prizes — Gold, Silver and Bronze — within each discipline based on jury score. Notable Gold recipients have included the Maserati MC20 (Product Design, 2021), San Francisco International Airport’s Terminal 3, Boarding Area E by Gensler (Interior Design, 2015), the Moesgaard Museum by Henning Larsen (Architecture, 2015), and Blade by Mino Caggiula (Architecture, 2023). A searchable directory of yearly winners is maintained by the organizer.

== History ==
A handful of designers, thinkers and entrepreneurs created the International Design Awards in 2007 as a response to the lack of recognition and celebration for smart and sustainable multidisciplinary design.

The International Design Awards were developed by Farmani Group. Recipients of Designer of the Year or Emerging Designer of the Year are awarded by invitation to the biannual International Design Awards gala in Los Angeles, a press campaign including links to their website reaching over 100,000 design professionals, press and potential clients, inclusion in the International Design Awards Design Directory and their Gallery of Winning Work, a feature in the International Design Awards Book of Designs, which is distributed to museums and design bookstores internationally, an International Design Awards Certificate of Achievements and permission to use the International Design Awards Winner's Seal on their website and printed materials.

Farmani Group assembled IDA as the design sibling of the Annual Lucie Awards for Photography.

== Honorees ==
=== 2007 ===
Designer of the Year:

- Architect of the Year - Skidmore, Owings & Merrill LLP - Al-Rajhi Bank Headquarters
- Fashion Design of the Year - JC Obando - Fall 2007
- Graphic Design of the Year – Volume Inc. - SFMOMA Poster
- Interior Design of the Year – Ministry of Design – SHO U
- Product Design of the Year – Humanscale Design Studio – T5

Emerging Designer of the Year:

- Architect of the Year – Orangelabs Studio – Biomedical Research Institute
- Graphic Design of the Year – Student – Symbols to Cultivate Change
- Interior Design of the Year – Timothy Schreiber – Evolution_Table
- Product Design of the Year – Pratt Institute – The Min. Chair

=== 2008 ===
Designer of the Year:

- Architect of the Year – PTW Architects with ARUP and CCDI – The Watercube
- Fashion Design of the Year – Toni Maticevski – Maticevski Spring Summer 2009
- Graphic Design of the Year – ICONISUS L & Y – Nip/tuck Operation Table
- Interior Design of the Year – Simone Micheli Architectural Hero – New Urban Face
- Product Design of the Year – Karten Design – Simple Tech Simple Drive

Emerging Designer of the Year:

- Architect of the Year – Vahan Misakyan – Project of a Hotel
- Fashion Design of the Year – Bonkuk Koo – Fashion Institute of Technology – Deep Black Sea
- Graphic Design of the Year – Alexandra Krietzsch – Rotary Watch Packaging
- Interior Design of the Year – RMIT University – Restaurant of the Earthly Deli
- Product Design of the Year – Shelly Shelly - Loft

=== 2009 ===
Designer of the Year:

- Architect of the Year – Architecton – K Clinic
- Fashion Designer of the Year – Society for Rational Dress – Society for Rational Dress
- Graphic Designer of the Year – Clif Bar Creative Group – Clif Bar Eco Challenge
- Interior Designer of the Year – Kossmann.dejong – Lee future center
- Product Designer of the Year – fuseproject – Mission ONE Motorbike

Emerging Designer of the Year:

- Architect of the Year – Studio 804 – Springfield Residence
- Graphic Designer of the Year – Derek Heinze Texas A & M – Commerce – SIGG Aluminum Bottles
- Interior Designer of the Year – Moscow State Stroganov Academy Design and Applied Arts – Contemporary art center
- Product Designer of the Year – Alper Gunduz - Revolv`O - as you can see the links https://www.idesignawards.com/winners/zoom.php?eid=9-3564-09 and https://www.idesignawards.com/winners/index.php?compNum=IDA%2009&level=student

=== 2010 ===
Designer of the Year:

- Architect of the Year – Henning Larsen Architects A/S – Batumi Aquarium
- Fashion Designer of the Year – KWARK – Kasia. N summer 10
- Graphic Designer of the Year – Love for Art & Business – The Royal Wedding
- Interior Designer of the Year – Ministry of Design – Leo BURNETT
- Product Designer of the Year – fuseproject – Herman Miller SAYL Chair

Emerging Designer of the Year:

- Architect of the Year – Yashin Kemal – Bus Terminal, Beijing, China
- Fashion Designer of the Year – Si Kim/Morpholision – Morphology Vision
- Graphic Designer of the Year – Tiffany Chui/Blue Coin Design Loft LP – NATURE'S FRESH COLOUR
- Interior Designer of the Year – UCO – making 5 different functional
- Product Designer of the Year – AMV-Design – Edge Desk

=== 2011 ===
Designer of the Year:

- Architecture of the Year – Bates Masi + Architects – Sam's Creek
- Fashion Design of the Year – Rei Kawakubo, founder and designer, Junya Watanabe, Tao Kurihara, Fumito Ganryu, Adrian Joffe designers – 2011 Collection
- Graphic Designer of the Year – Andrew J. Nilsen [Art director] Brian Stauffer [Illustrator] – Worlds Apart
- Interior Design of the Year – One Plus Partnership Limited – Wuhan Pixel Box Cinema
- Product Design of the Year – Fisker Automotive – Fisker Karma EVer

Emerging Designer of the Year:

- Architecture of the Year – Bryant Lau Liang Cheng – Amalgamation
- Product Designer of the Year – Jesse Leeworthy – Ishke
- Graphic Design of the Year – Fung, Cheng-Wen – Money Attack
- Interior Design of the Year – KBU International College – Mecanique Toy Store

=== 2012 ===
Designer of the Year:

- Architecture of the Year – Ward+Blake Architects – EarthWall 2
- Fashion Design of the Year – Ashish Gupta Fall 2012
- Graphic Design of the Year – CASA REX – 14th USP Book Festival
- Interior Design of the Year – Nikken Space Design LTD – THE ROPPONGI TOKYO
- Product Design of the Year – One & Co – Windows Phone 8S

Emerging Designer of the Year:

- Architecture of the Year – Bryant Lau Liang Cheng – Metamorphosis
- Fashion Design of the Year – Eunsol Ansley Lee – Movement as Fashion-Art
- Graphic Design of the Year – Temple University – Junction
- Interior Design of the Year – University of Applied Sciences Darmstadt, banozic architecture | scenography – Trillusion
- Product Design of the Year – Nur Yıldırım - Steam Beam

=== 2013 ===
Designer of the Year:

- Architecture of the Year – ATP architects engineers - G3 Shopping Resort
- Fashion Design of the Year – Masha Ma - AW 2014
- Graphic Design of the Year – Rice Creative - UNICEF ZEROawards
- Interior Design of the Year – Camenzind Evolution in collaboration with Henry J. Lyons Architects - GoogleOfficeCampusDublin
- Product Design of the Year – fuseproject - MINI Jambox Speaker for Jawbone

Emerging Designer of the Year:

- Architecture of the Year – Alison Chan Student at University of Hong kong (Architecture Thesis) - Wine Anatomy
- Fashion Design of the Year – E WHA LIM - Never Ever Land
- Graphic Design of the Year – Josh Turner - Next Time Make Sure They Get Lego
- Interior Design of the Year – Drexel University - Neuro-creativity Center
- Product Design of the Year – Joongu Kim - PINECONE

=== 2014 ===
Designer of the Year:

- Architecture of the Year – PLUS-SUM Studio – Guggenheim Helsinki
- Fashion Design of the Year – Paragon Design Limited - Wearable art 2013
- Graphic Design of the Year – CASA REX – Campari Gift Box
- Interior Design of the Year – Gensler – San Francisco International Airport, Terminal 3, Boarding Area E
- Product Design of the Year – Studio Backs – Vessel Kitchen

Emerging Designer of the Year:

- Architecture of the Year – VAK Studio – QUAD ONE Module Housing
- Fashion Design of the Year – CADAVER – Obsolescence
- Graphic Design of the Year – WOODBURY UNIVERSITY – Icelandic Cultural Center Logo
- Interior Design of the Year – PBSA Duesseldorf/ Germany
- Product Design of the Year – The University of Nottingham (UNNC) - The Smart Sofa

=== 2015 ===
Design of the Year:

- Architectural Design of the Year – Arup Associates – Singapore National Stadium
- Fashion Design of the Year – Gabriele Colangelo – Spring & Summer 2015
- Graphic Design of the Year – Mert Kizilay – Frank Riggio – TTTT
- Interior Design of the Year – CURIOSITY – Palazzo Fendi
- Product Design of the Year – Volvo Cars – The all-new 2016 XC90

Emerging Designer of the Year:

- Emerging Architectural Designer of the Year – Arezou Zaredar - Five Senses Museum
- Emerging Fashion Designer of the Year – Savannah College of Art and Design- Haint II
- Emerging Graphic Designer of the Year – Jiyoung Oh- Their Danger, A dangerous Commute
- Emerging Interior Designer of the Year – Tara Headley- Promoting Peace and Cultural understanding between the United States and the Middle East through experience design
- Emerging Product Designer of the Year – Sean Naderzad Aaron Mazikowski- The Seamless

=== 2016 ===
Design of the Year:

- Architectural Design of the Year – Stinessen Arkitektur - Manshausen Island Resort
- Fashion Design of the Year – Alisa Sibgatova – Witch Craft – - New Classics
- Graphic Design of the Year – Phoenix The Creative Studio– Cannes Lions Survival Kit
- Interior Design of the Year – Panorama International Ltd.– Wateryard House
- Product Design of the Year – Elica S.p.A.– Nikolatesla

Emerging Designer of the Year:

- Emerging Architectural Designer of the Year – Reyhane Sanati - Mothers & babies Care center
- Emerging Fashion Designer of the Year – Savannah College of Art and Design- Tibet Woman
- Emerging Graphic Designer of the Year – Yu-Jia Huang - Baskerville: Eyewear & More
- Emerging Interior Designer of the Year – National Taipei University of Technology -

Natural Healing Workshop

- Emerging Product Designer of the Year – Mohammadamir Safari- Aalto Chair

=== 2017 ===
Design of the Year:

- Architectural Design of the Year – fjmt-Bunjil Place
- Fashion Design of the Year – //JENS_LAUGESEN - HYreCON 01 TRILOGY / AW18 collection
- Graphic Design of the Year – Open - ACLU visual identity
- Interior Design of the Year – Mesura - Can Llimona
- Product Design of the Year - Elica S.p.A. - Lullaby

Emerging Designer of the Year:

- Emerging Architectural Designer of the Year – Najafabad Branch Islamic Azad University (Iaun)-Hotel Bio
- Emerging Fashion Designer of the Year – Savannah College of Art and Design - Suora
- Emerging Graphic Designer of the Year – Savannah College of Art and Design - Nihilism For Beginners
- Emerging Interior Designer of the Year – British Higher School of Art and Design - Center For Multimedia Arts "ges-2"
- Emerging Product Designer of the Year –Islamic Art University of Tabriz - BlackHoleHood

=== 2018 ===
Design of the Year:

- Architectural Design of the Year – Challenge Design - Yuanlu Community Center in Chongqing
- Fashion Design of the Year – Nanushka- Nanushka Pre-Fall 2019 collection
- Graphic Design of the Year – BRED – Drew’s ABCs
- Interior Design of the Year – Gensler - Gusto
- Product Design of the Year - Valery Graznov & Semenko Design - Uslon Life-saving swimwear

Emerging Designer of the Year:

- Emerging Architectural Designer of the Year – Instituto Marangoni Milano Design School - Taino Interpretation Centre
- Emerging Fashion Designer of the Year – Central Saint Martins- Bunker Office
- Emerging Graphic Designer of the Year – School of Visual Arts - Sakura Matsuri: Cherry Blossom Festival
- Emerging Interior Designer of the Year – New York School of Interior Design - M hotel
- Emerging Product Designer of the Year – Ming Chi University of Technology - RBTT

=== 2019 ===
Design of the Year:

- Architectural Design of the Year – Domaen Ltd - ARB Residence
- Fashion Design of the Year – Gavin Rajah Atelier - Cleopatra in Africa
- Graphic Design of the Year – Logitech Europe S.A. - G502 LIGHTSPEED Wireless Gaming Mouse Video
- Interior Design of the Year – fujian Wuje Decoration Design Engineering Co. Ltd - WUJE
- Product Design of the Year - Neuron EV - TORQ

Emerging Designer of the Year:

- Emerging Architectural Designer of the Year – Yiyang Xu; Jingyi Ye (Arctic Saver Tower)
- Emerging Fashion Designer of the Year – Yayi Chen (in tran · sient)
- Emerging Graphic Designer of the Year – SCAD Student Designer (Mother Shrub Identity Rebrand)
- Emerging Interior Designer of the Year – Zhuolan Zhang (Spa Chameleon)
- Emerging Product Designer of the Year – Macie Whitbeck, Lillian Hubbell, Valerie Nuñez (Axis for Natural Disasters)

=== 2020 ===
Design of the Year:

- Architectural Design of the Year - aoe – One Sino Park
- Fashion Design of the Year - V Visionary Design Studio – V VISSI: revisit - Collection of Sustainability
- Graphic Design of the Year - Logitech Europe S.A. – Ergo Characters
- Interior Design of the Year - Karim Rashid Inc – Switch Bahrain
- Product Design of the Year- Lotus Cars - Lotus Evija

Emerging Designer of the Year:

- Architectural Design of the Year – Jui-Feng Tang, Chih-Ting Yeh, Lang Wen Ma – Cyclone Catcher
- Fashion Design of the Year – Team HANDIONE – Be covered with mystique
- Graphic Design of the Year – Bonggu(Jeremy) Kang – Mystic Wings
- Interior Design of the Year – Jessica Wing Lam Ma – The Independent Living Inc.
- Product Design of the Year – Siyu Ai – Elevate-X

=== 2021 ===
Design of the Year:

- Architectural Design of the Year - SYN Architects, Zou Yingxi – The Hometown Moon
- Fashion Design of the Year - Kyle Denman – mul·ti·po·lar—ex·ist·ence
- Graphic Design of the Year - Pepsico Design & Innovation, Pepsico Design & Innovation – Pepsi Culture Can LTO - Mexico
- Interior Design of the Year - Atelier Štěpán s.r.o., Marek Štěpán – Church of Beatified Restitute
- Product Design of the Year - Maserati S.p.a. - Maserati MC20

Emerging Designer of the Year:

- Architectural Design of the Year – Savannah College of Art and Design, Mateo Mantilla – Terminale Dell'Isola
- Fashion Design of the Year – IFA Paris, Olivia Natasha Jieftara – Traverse in Within
- Graphic Design of the Year – Savannah College of Art and Design, Nora Bukhari – You title sequence
- Interior Design of the Year – Savannah College of Art and Design, Crystal Martin – Rich's Department Store Rehabilitation
- Product Design of the Year – Artcenter College of Design, Chingyu Lei – Tesla Model D

=== 2022 ===
Design of the Year:

- Architectural Design of the Year – Zhejiang Province Institute of Architectural Design and Research, Yao Zhiyu;Fang Fang – Shangyu Museum
- Fashion Design of the Year – GENERIC SENS LTD / JENS LAUGESEN DESIGN STUDIO, Jens Laugesen – INRECON / SOLARIS AW22
- Graphic Design of the Year – Total Design, Edwin van Praet – Limburgs Museum – Van ós. For everybody.
- Interior Design of the Year – Dina Marciano Design, Dina Marciano – Emerald Bay
- Product Design of the Year – OXOS, Luke Pfost – MC2

Emerging Designer of the Year:

- Architectural Design of the Year – Azad, Mahsa Mohebbi, Mitra Mohebbi, Amin Moazzen – Crassula
- Fashion Design of the Year – Auckland University of Technology, Sheetol Chawla – Spiritual Shift
- Graphic Design of the Year – Utah Valley University, Joslynn Taylor – Desired
- Interior Design of the Year – New York School of Interior Design, Sheng Wei Yang – Moncler Soho
- Product Design of the Year – Artcenter College of Design, Shuaicheng (Drake) Dong – ATLAS

=== 2023 ===
Designer of the Year:

- Architectural Design of the Year – REX, Joshua Ramus – The Perelman Performing Arts Center
- Fashion Design of the Year – Maara Collective, Julie Shaw (in collaboration with Bula'bula Arts) – Maayama-li Dress
- Graphic Design of the Year – Yiwen Zhang, Yiwen Zhang – Rhythmic Structure of Typography
- Interior Design of the Year – SpActrum - Yan Pan; Guan Xiaohao – Hangzhou M2 Art Center
- Product Design of the Year – fusodesign, Ivan Vecchia – AirOwater-water dispenser

Emerging Designer of the Year:

- Architectural Design of the Year – LuXun Academy of Fine Arts，Northwest University, Yao Dai – PURE
- Fashion Design of the Year – Savannah College of Art and Design, Nathan Batra – Humanesque
- Graphic Design of the Year – Savannah College of Art and Design, Aarushi Menon – The Celestial Archivist
- Product Design of the Year – Central Saint Martins - University of The Arts London, Ahmet Ergun, Stefano Balzan, Yutong Zhang – Rekit

=== 2024 ===
Designer of the Year:

- Architectural Design of the Year – LYT-X STUDIO – Brise-Vent Havre Harbor Museum
- Fashion Design of the Year – Marginalia
- Graphic Design of the Year – Munchkin
- Interior Design of the Year – Fujian Jianyan Engineering Consulting Co., Ltd. – Wanbao Christian Church
- Product Design of the Year – Framery – Framery smart pod product family

Emerging Designer of the Year:

- Architectural Design of the Year – Pratt Institute – Exploratorium
- Fashion Design of the Year – Parsons School of Design – Nostalgia
- Graphic Design of the Year – Swinburne University of Technology – The Homeless Project
- Interior Design of the Year – University of Architecture Ho Chi Minh City – El tren en España
- Product Design of the Year – Savannah College of Art and Design – Tyr Concept EV
