= The Pace Collection =

American furniture company

- Industry: Furniture
- Founded: 1960
- Founder: Irving Rosen; Leon Rosen
- Defunct: 2001

The Pace Collection was a high-end contemporary furniture company in business from 1960 to 2001. The company was founded by Irving and Leon Rosen in New York City. The showroom was located in Manhattan on East 62nd Street to offer its fine furniture and services to the contract interior design trade. The Pace Collection advertised in numerous architectural and interior design periodicals. The Pace Collection furniture designs were all distinctly different from those offered by Knoll (company), Herman Miller, Steelcase and other contract furniture companies.

The Pace Collection line of desks, tables and cabinets was distinguished by the unique Rosen style employing rich, exotic wood veneers having high-gloss finishes with polished stainless steel trim. The Pace Collection also offered its own line of chairs, sofas, shelves and accessories. The Rosens patented many of their designs.

In 1985, the Rosen partnership ended. Leon Rosen commissioned New York architect Steven Holl to design a new showroom. This showroom, which opened in 1986, was located on the corner of Madison Avenue and East 72nd Street. Holl received the American Institute of Architects (AIA) award for best architectural design in New York in 1986 for the new Pace Collection showroom. Holl also designed several furniture pieces for The Pace Collection, which were patented.

After opening of the new showroom, president Leon Rosen told New York magazine, “I wanted high visibility. I wanted this showcase to serve as a reminder to our regular customers, and to expose our company to new people.”
