= Daeyang Gallery and House =

Building in Seoul, South Korea

Coordinates: 37.59291°N 127.07657°E

- Interactive map of the Daeyang Gallery and House area

General information
- Location: Seoul, South Korea
- Construction started: 2008
- Completed: 2012
- Opening: June 2012

Technical details
- Floor area: 10703 sf

Design and construction
- Architect: Steven Holl Architects

The Daeyang Gallery and House, designed by Steven Holl Architects, is located in the Kangbuk neighborhood of Seoul, South Korea. The geometry of the roof plan was inspired by a 1967 sketch for a music score by Hungarian composer István Anhalt.

Three pavilion, one for entry, one event space, and one residential, are separated by a reflecting pool. Below, they are connected by a continuous art gallery space. Skylights cut in the roof of the pavilions and in the base of the reflecting pool bring natural light to the spaces, and gallery level below.

The interiors of the pavilions have red and charcoal stained wood, and the exterior is a rain screen of patinated copper.

The 10703 sf house and gallery was completed in June 2012.
