= Alice Trepp =

Ecuadorian visual artist

- Born: Quito, Ecuador
- Known for: Painting, sculpture, drawing

Alice Trepp is an Ecuadorian visual artist and sculptor whose work spans figurative painting and drawing. Her art has been exhibited in prominent institutions such as the Museo de América in Madrid and the Museo Nahim Isaías in Guayaquil.

== Career ==
Born in Quito, Ecuador, Trepp studied drawing, painting and sculpture in Ecuador and abroad, later pursuing an international artistic career. In 2019 she held a solo exhibition titled La Carga at the Museo de América in Madrid, a state ethnography and culture museum, which was covered by media outlets including *El Comercio*. The La Carga project subsequently toured in Ecuador, including a solo show at the Museo Nahim Isaías in Guayaquil, covered by *Expreso* and *El Universo*.

In 2023, she participated in the group exhibition Arte e Identidad at the Centro Cultural Metropolitano in Quito, an event supported by the Municipality of Quito.

Trepp’s atelier, located near Origlio in Switzerland, was designed by Mino Caggiula and has been featured in architectural publications. The design seamlessly integrates into the landscape, embedding the atelier within the hillside and incorporating a cenote as the architectural and sensory core.

== Awards ==
In 2017 she received the Premio Mariano Aguilera a la Trayectoria, one of Ecuador’s major art awards.

== Selected exhibitions ==
- 2019 – La Carga, Museo de América, Madrid, Spain (solo)
- 2019 – La Carga, Museo Nahim Isaías, Guayaquil, Ecuador (solo)
- 2023 – Arte e Identidad, Centro Cultural Metropolitano, Quito, Ecuador (group)
