= Chesapeake Bay Foundation =

American non-profit organization

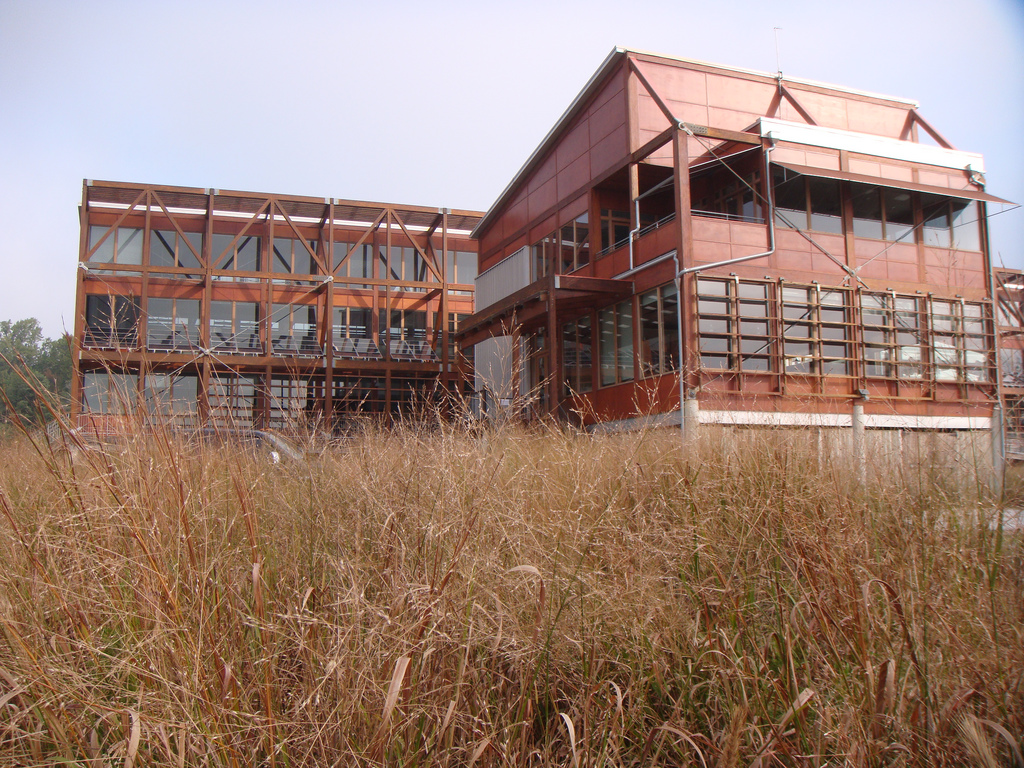
- The Philip Merrill Environmental Center, Chesapeake Bay Foundation headquarters
- Founded: 1967; 59 years ago
- Founder: Arthur Sherwood et al.
- Type: Nonprofit
- Tax ID no.: 52-6065757
- Legal status: 501(c)(3)
- Purpose: Environmental protection and preservation
- Headquarters: Annapolis, Maryland
- Location: United States
- Board Chair: Otis S. Jones
- President: Hilary Harp Falk
- Staff: 185
- Website: www.cbf.org

The Chesapeake Bay Foundation (CBF) is a non-profit organization devoted to the restoration and protection of the Chesapeake Bay in the United States. It was founded in 1967 and has headquarters offices in Annapolis, Maryland. The foundation has field offices in Salisbury, Maryland; Harrisburg, Pennsylvania; Richmond, Virginia; Norfolk, Virginia and Washington, D.C.

== Establishment ==
The foundation was established by Arthur Sherwood, a businessman and lawyer, with friends in 1967. As of 1996 CBF had about 80,000 dues-paying members.

== Programs ==
CBF offers an outdoor education program that has introduced several generations of school children to the Chesapeake Bay through several idyllic outposts along the Bay's shores, such as Fox Island, Smith Island, Bishops Head, and others. Children learn the fragile nature of the Bay's ecosystem, and the extent of its watershed, much of which includes their own homes in suburbia. CBF also lobbies state and local governments on regulations intended to protect the health of the Bay.

In 2024, the CBF lobbied to stop construction of proposed power lines through Maryland.

=== Litigation ===
The foundation has litigated multiple cases regarding protection of bay water quality, both at the federal and state level.

In 2009, CBF filed suit against the US Environmental Protection Agency (EPA) for its failure to finalize a total maximum daily load (TMDL) ruling pursuant to the Clean Water Act that would restrict water pollution from farms, land development, power plants and sewage treatment plants. EPA agreed to settle the lawsuit and issued its TMDL for nitrogen, phosphorus and sediment pollution on December 29, 2010. This was the largest, most complex TMDL document that EPA had issued to date. In early 2011 the American Farm Bureau Federation and other agricultural trade associations, along with the National Association of Home Builders filed suit challenging EPA's authority to issue the TMDL. CBF and other organizations (both environmental groups and local governments) filed a motion to intervene in the case. In 2013 the Pennsylvania district court judge upheld EPA's authority, and following appeal by the trade associations, the judge's decision was affirmed by the Third Circuit Court of Appeals. In 2016 the US Supreme Court declined to hear the case, thereby upholding EPA's authority.

In the 2010s and 2020s, CBF was involved in lawsuits to stop the relicensing of the Conowingo dam, a hydropower plant that generates emission-free electricity to power 165,000 homes.

In 2020 CBF filed a lawsuit against EPA for its failure to require the states of New York and Pennsylvania to reduce pollution in the bay.

== New headquarters building ==
In 2001, CBF moved from a walkable downtown location in Annapolis to a new headquarters building, the Philip Merrill Environmental Center, about 5 miles (8 km) outside of town. The new building, at the former site of the Bay Ridge Inn on the western shore of the Chesapeake Bay, is a green building that demonstrates a number of energy-saving and other sustainable features. It was the first building to receive the Leadership in Energy and Environmental Design (LEED) "Platinum" rating from the United States Green Building Council.

The new headquarters is not accessible by public transportation. The foundation's choice for a new headquarters site symbolizes a dilemma of the modern environmental movement: how to be connected to the environment without despoiling it. In this case, the enlarged footprint of employees and visitors forced to drive to the building was offset by its reduced imperviousness compared to the former inn, use of recycled materials, re-use of wastewater on-site, and use of composting toilets. The building was an early adopter of green building principles, but apart from automobiles and bicycles, remains inaccessible by other modes of transportation.

== Leadership ==
In January 2021 CBF president Will Baker announced that he intended to retire by the end of 2021. Baker became president and Chief Executive Officer (CEO) of the organization in 1981. In November 2021 the foundation announced that the new president and CEO will be Hilary Harp Falk.

== See also ==
- South River Federation
