= Frederick J. Smith House =

Coordinates: 41.0545°N 73.4559°W

- Interactive map of the Frederick J. Smith House area

General information
- Location: Toekeneke, Darien, CT, 16 Shennamere Rd,, Darien, CT
- Year built: 1967

Design and construction
- Architect: Richard Meier
- Architecture firm: Richard Meier Associates
- Awards: AIA National Honor Award Twenty-five Year Award AIA AIA New England Award AIANY Award

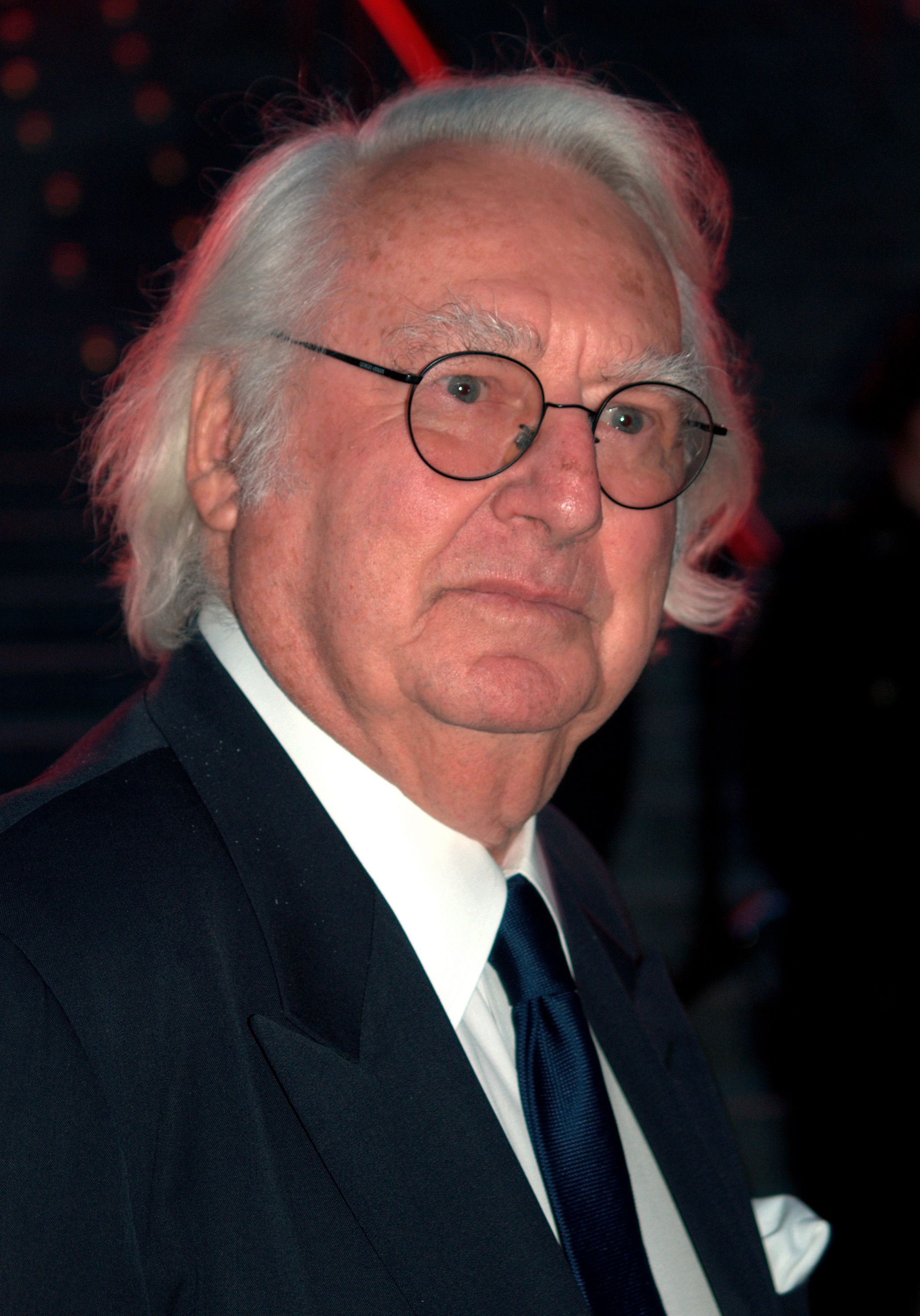
Pictured is well-known architect Richard Meier, who was responsible for the design of the Smith house.

The Smith House is a work of contemporary architecture designed by Richard Meier, a well-known architect born in 1934 who led the avant-garde modern architecture movement of the 1960s. The Smith House was planned starting in 1965 and completed in 1967 in Darien, Connecticut, and overlooks the Long Island Sound from the Connecticut coast. The 2,800 square-foot home has been featured in numerous books and has won various prestigious awards.

The back of the Smith House, which faces the water, has an open façade with three levels of glass enclosure, providing sweeping, waterfront views. "There is a formal layering, giving a sense of progression, as one moves across the site from the entrance road down to the shore, and the 'line of progression' determines the major site axis," Meier has written. "Perpendicular to this axis, the intersecting planes in the house respond to the rhythms of the slope, trees, rock outcroppings, and the shoreline." Shortly after the house was built, Fred and Carole Smith divorced. When Carole remarried, Meier was hired to expand the house. A 300 square-foot expansion was added to the master suite. The house was owned by the Smith's sons, Chuck Smith & Hobie Smith. In 2022, the sons sold the house privately to Thomas Majewski, a longstanding resident of the neighborhood.

To give some context to the architect, Richard Meier was born in 1934, and was one of the five leading avant-garde architects in the 1960s, along with Charles Gwathmey, Peter Eisenman, Michael Graves, and John Hejduk. The Fred I. Smith House was one of Meier's first largely-recognized works and was part of a series of single-family homes that mark a first-step in Meier's work. It won numerous prizes shortly following its construction. In 1968, one year after it was constructed, it won the AIA National Honor Award, the AIA New England Award, the AIANY Award, and the AIA National Award. Later, in 2000, it received yet another award, the Twenty-five Year Award from the American Institute of Architects.
