= Linked Hybrid =

Building complex in Beijing, China

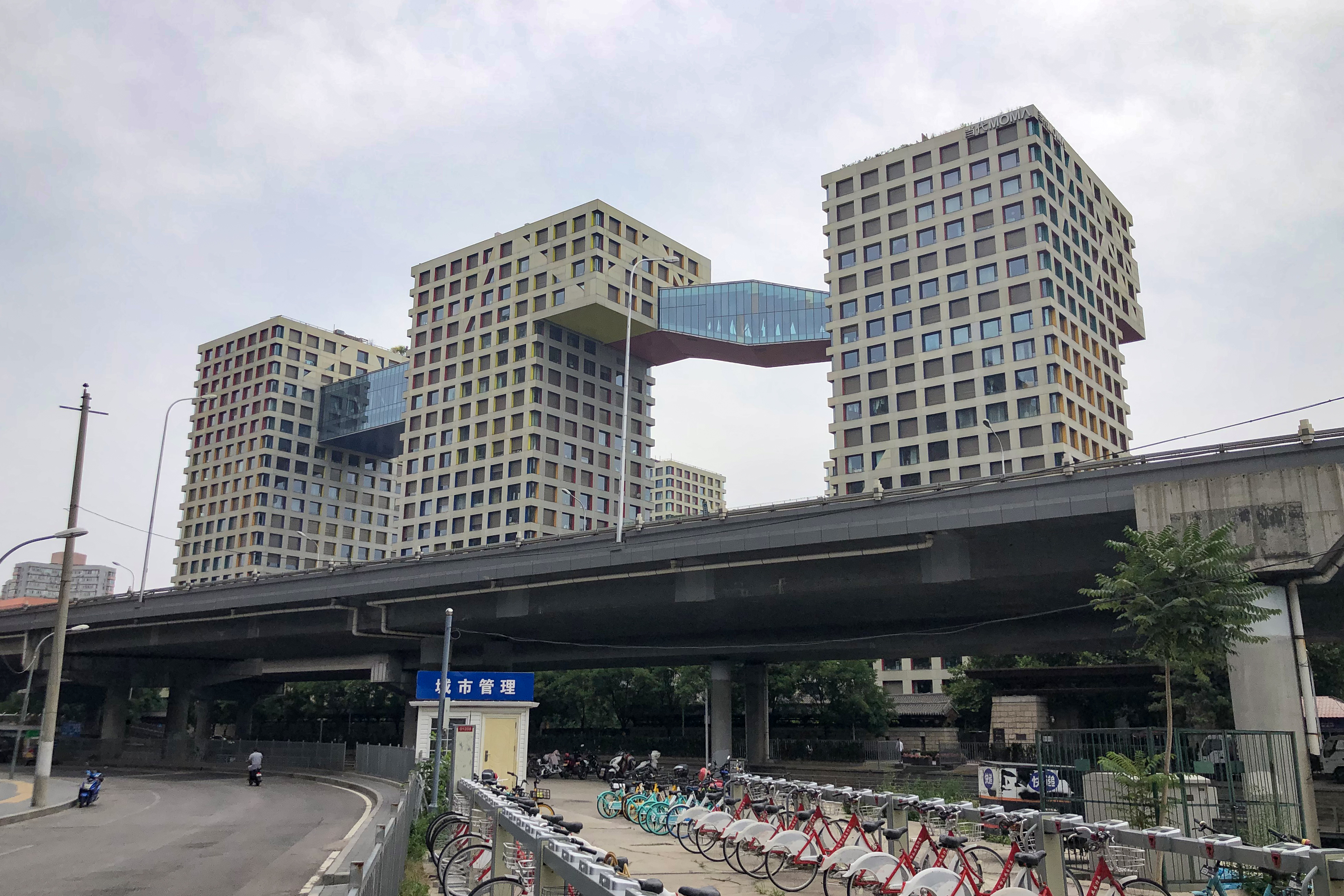
- Interactive map of the Linked Hybrid area

General information
- Location: Dongzhimen Subdistrict, Dongcheng District, Beijing, China
- Coordinates: 39°56′57.50″N 116°25′53.50″E
- Construction started: 2003
- Completed: 2009
- Opening: 2009

Height
- Roof: 223 ft (68 m)

Technical details
- Floor count: 21
- Floor area: 221,426 sm

Design and construction
- Architect: Steven Holl Architects
- Structural engineer: Guy Nordenson and Associates; Cosentini Associates
- Main contractor: Beijing Construction Engineering Group

Linked Hybrid (Chinese: 北京当代MOMA) is a building complex built in Beijing, China designed by Steven Holl Architects. It is recognized for its environmental design and uses geo-thermal wells for cooling and heating. Linked Hybrid has won several awards such as the Best Tall Building Overall Award by the Council on Tall Buildings and Urban Habitat in 2009.

Located near the old city wall, it was designed as a pedestrian-oriented combination of public and private space that encourages the use of shared resources and reduces the need for wasteful modes of transit.

== Features ==
Linked Hybrid was built from 2003 to 2009. It has over 2500 inhabitants. It contains 750 apartments, commercial areas, parking, hotel, cinema, and educational facilities including a kindergarten and Montessori school.

== Sustainable Aspects ==
Linked Hybrid's ground source heat pump system shoulders 70% of the complex's yearly heating and cooling load. The system consists of 655 geothermal wells, 100 meters below the basement foundation. The underground wells have taken the place of above-ground space normally needed for cooling towers, increasing available green areas, minimizing noise pollution and significantly reducing the CO_{2} emissions created by traditional heating/cooling methods.

Linked Hybrid makes use of a technique called displacement ventilation, in which air that is slightly below desired temperature in a room is released from the floor. The cooler air displaces the warmer air, causing it to be released from the room and resulting in a cooler overall space and a fresh breathing environment.

== Awards ==
- Popular Science Engineering Award for Largest Geothermal Housing Complex, USA, 2006
- AIA New York Chapter Sustainable Design Award, USA, 2008
- CTBUH 2009 Best Tall Building Overall and Asia & Australasia, USA
- CTBUH 2009 Best Tall Building Overall
- Architectural Record China, "Good Design is Good Business" Award for Best Residential Project, 2010
