= Twenty-five Year Award =

Architectural prize

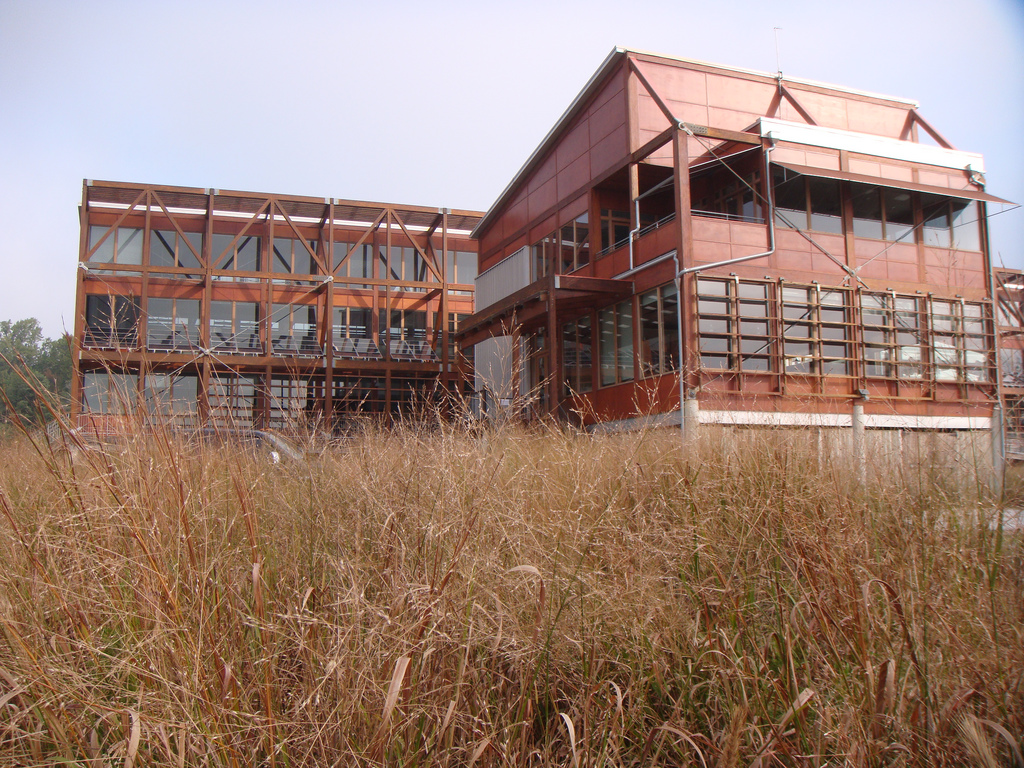
- The 2026 award recipient, the Philip Merrill Environmental Center (Annapolis, Maryland)
- Awarded for: Long-term excellence in American architecture
- Country: United States
- Presented by: American Institute of Architects
- First award: 1969
- Website: aia.org

The Twenty-five Year Award is an architectural prize awarded each year by the American Institute of Architects (AIA) to "a building that has set a precedent for the last 25 to 35 years and continues to set standards of excellence for its architectural design and significance" and which was designed by an architect licensed in the United States. The Twenty-five Year Award was first presented in 1969, and has been handed out every year from 1971 onward, with the exceptions of 2018 and 2025. In 2026, the prize was awarded to the Philip Merrill Environmental Center in Annapolis, Maryland by SmithGroup.

Five buildings in New York City have received the award, the most of any city. Washington, D.C., is second with three, while Boston, Chicago, Los Angeles, and New Haven each have two. Only seven buildings outside of the United States have received the award: two in London, England, and one each in Jeddah, Saudi Arabia; Barcelona, Spain; Bilbao, Spain; Paris, France; and Tokyo, Japan.

Finnish American architect Eero Saarinen designed or contributed to six buildings so honored, tied with the architectural firm of Skidmore, Owings & Merrill. Louis I. Kahn and Frank Lloyd Wright each have five buildings that have been honored that were designed or contributed to by them; Frank Lloyd Wright has 4, and there are three apiece by Ludwig Mies van der Rohe and the firm Pei Cobb Freed & Partners. Of the 53 projects that received this award through 2022, only three had women as contributing architects: the Eames House, the Vietnam Veterans Memorial, and the Sainsbury Wing at the National Gallery.

== Eligibility ==
The Twenty-five Year Award can be awarded to any type of architectural project and may be either a single structure or a group of structures that compose a larger whole. Winners have included monuments, such as the Gateway Arch and Vietnam Veterans Memorial, and groupings of buildings, such as the Salk Institute for Biological Studies and Haystack Mountain School of Crafts. Most buildings nominated for this award are new structures but one winner, Faneuil Hall Marketplace, was a substantial renovation of warehouses into a festival marketplace.

For a project to be eligible to win the Twenty-five Year Award, it must have been built between 25 and 35 years before the year of the award. It must also have been designed by "an architect licensed in the United States at the time of the project's completion". This means that the award candidate can be anywhere in the world, but must have been designed by a licensed American architect, such as the Fundació Joan Miró in Spain.

To be nominated the project must be in a "substantially completed form" as well as "in good condition". Potential candidates must not have been altered substantially since they were built. Change of use is allowed by the rules, but the "original intent" of the structure must still be intact. These changes of use include reorganization of interior space. This was taken into account with the Price Tower, which when built was a mix of offices and apartments, but when awarded, had only one apartment remaining. The award is presented at the AIA National Convention each year.

== Nomination procedure ==
"Any AIA member, group of members, component, or Knowledge Community" is allowed to nominate a project for the Twenty-five Year Award. A project may be nominated multiple times, as long as it still complies with the eligibility requirements. Nominees are judged by today's architectural standards in their function, execution, and creativity. The project and its site are judged together, with any changes in context taken into account.

== Award recipients ==
The "Year" column, which indicates when the building won the award, links to an article about the year's significant architectural events.

Year	Building(s) city	Image	Architect(s)
1969	Rockefeller Center; New York City, New York	Rockefeller Center and surrounding buildings	Reinhard & Hofmeister; Corbett, Harrison & MacMurray
1971	Crow Island School; Winnetka, Illinois	Crow Island School	Perkins, Wheeler & Will; Eliel & Eero Saarinen
1972	Baldwin Hills Village; Los Angeles, California	Main building of Baldwin Hills Village	Reginald D. Johnson; Wilson, Merrill & Alexander; Clarence S. Stein
1973	Taliesin West; Paradise Valley, Arizona	Taliesin West with a pool in the foreground	Frank Lloyd Wright
1974	Johnson and Son Administration Building; Racine, Wisconsin	The Johnson Wax building with a large globe in the foreground	Frank Lloyd Wright
1975	Philip Johnson's Residence ("The Glass House"); New Canaan, Connecticut	The glas shouse surrounded by trees, pathways, and a lawn	Philip Johnson
1976	860–880 North Lakeshore Drive Apartments; Chicago, Illinois	860–880 Lakeshore Drive with surrounding roads and buildings	Ludwig Mies van der Rohe
1977	Christ Lutheran Church; Minneapolis, Minnesota	Christ Lutheran Church	Saarinen, Saarinen & Associates; Hills, Gilbertson & Hays
1978	Eames House; Pacific Palisades, California	The front door and trees of the Eames House	Charles and Ray Eames
1979	Yale University Art Gallery; New Haven, Connecticut	Side View of the Yale University Art Gallery	Louis I. Kahn
1980	Lever House; New York City, New York	Lever House, surrounding buildings, and plaza	Skidmore, Owings & Merrill
1981	Farnsworth House; Plano, Illinois	Farnsworth house during the winter	Ludwig Mies van der Rohe
1982	Equitable Savings and Loan Building; Portland, Oregon	The Equitable Savings and Loan Building and surrounding buildings	Pietro Belluschi
1983	Price Tower; Bartlesville, Oklahoma	Price Tower on an overcast day	Frank Lloyd Wright
1984	Seagram Building; New York City, New York	Seagram Building viewed from its broad side	Ludwig Mies van der Rohe
1985	General Motors Technical Center; Warren, Michigan	General Motors Technical Center viewed from afar	Eero Saarinen and Associates with Smith, Hinchman & Grylls
1986	Solomon R. Guggenheim Museum; New York City, New York	The Guggenheim museum with taxis in the foreground	Frank Lloyd Wright
1987	Bavinger House; Norman, Oklahoma	Bavinger house and surrounding forest	Bruce Goff
1988	Washington Dulles International Airport Terminal Building; Chantilly, Virginia	Dulles Airport Terminal Building	Eero Saarinen and Associates
1989	Vanna Venturi House; Chestnut Hill, Pennsylvania	Vanna Venturi House and front yard	Robert Venturi
1990	Gateway Arch; St. Louis, Missouri	The Gateway Arch with the Saint Louis skyline in the background	Eero Saarinen and Associates
1991	Sea Ranch Condominium One; Sea Ranch, California	Sea Ranch Condominium One viewed from land	Moore Lyndon Turnbull Whitaker
1992	Salk Institute for Biological Studies; La Jolla, California	The Salk Institute viewed from below	Louis I. Kahn
1993	Deere & Company Administrative Center; Moline, Illinois	Deere & Company Administrative Center with surrounding streets	Eero Saarinen and Associates
1994	Haystack Mountain School of Crafts; Deer Isle, Maine	—	Edward Larrabee Barnes
1995	Ford Foundation Headquarters; New York City, New York	Ford Foundation Headquarters partially obscured by trees	Kevin Roche, John Dinkeloo and Associates
1996	United States Air Force Academy Cadet Chapel; Colorado Springs, Colorado	Air Force Cadet Chapel against a blue sky	Skidmore, Owings & Merrill
1997	Phillips Exeter Academy Library; Exeter, New Hampshire	Phillips Exter Academy Library with surrounding lawn and trees	Louis I. Kahn
1998	Kimbell Art Museum; Fort Worth, Texas	Kimbell Art Museum and surrounding green	Louis I. Kahn
1999	John Hancock Center; Chicago, Illinois	John Hancock Center and Chicago water tower	Skidmore, Owings & Merrill
2000	The Smith House; Darien, Connecticut	—	Richard Meier & Partners
2001	Weyerhaeuser Corporate Headquarters; Federal Way, Washington	View of the Weyerhaeuser headquarters showing a parking lot in the foreground and the cascadign plants over its facade.	Skidmore, Owings & Merrill LLP, Fazlur Rahman Khan
2002	Fundació Joan Miró; Barcelona, Spain	Fundació Joan Miró and entrance way gardens	Sert Jackson and Associates
2003	Design Research Headquarters Building; Cambridge, Massachusetts	Front of the Design Research Headquarters Building	BTA Architects (formerly Benjamin Thompson & Associates, Inc.)
2004	East Building, National Gallery of Art; Washington, D.C.	East Building of the national Gallery of Art with surrounding plaza	I.M. Pei & Partners, Architects
2005	Yale Center for British Art; New Haven, Connecticut	Yale Center for British Art with surrounding buildings and trees	Louis I. Kahn
2006	Thorncrown Chapel; Eureka Springs, Arkansas	Front of the Thorncrown Chapel partially obscured by trees	E. Fay Jones
2007	Vietnam Veterans Memorial; Washington, D.C.	Aerial view of the Vietnam Veterans Memorial	Maya Lin, designer; Cooper-Lecky Architects, architect of record
2008	The Atheneum; New Harmony, Indiana	The Antheneum and surrounding lawn	Richard Meier & Partners
2009	Faneuil Hall Marketplace; Boston, Massachusetts	Oblique view of Faneuil hall Marketplace and surrounding pedestrian mall	BTA Architects (formerly Benjamin Thompson & Associates, Inc.)
2010	The Hajj Terminal at King Abdulaziz International Airport; Jeddah, Saudi Arabia	Interior of the Hajj Terminal	Skidmore, Owings & Merrill LLP
2011	John Hancock Tower; Boston, Massachusetts	The John Hancock Tower with the Charles River in the foreground	I.M. Pei & Partners
2012	Gehry Residence; Santa Monica, California	View of Gehry Residence	Gehry Partners LLP
2013	Menil Collection; Houston, Texas	View of Menil Collection	Renzo Piano Building Workshop LLP
2014	Washington Metro; Washington, D.C.	Intersection of ceiling vaults at Metro Center station	Harry Weese
2015	Exchange House, Broadgate; London, England	Exchange House seen from Exchange Square	Skidmore, Owings & Merrill LLP
2016	Monterey Bay Aquarium; Monterey, California	The main entrance of the Monterey Bay Aquarium and the smokestacks on its roof resemble the former Hovden Cannery that it replaced	EHDD
2017	Grand Louvre – Phase 1 Paris, rance	Nighttime scene of the Louvre courtyard in Paris, with the iconic glass pyramid designed by I.M. Pei in the foreground and the palace in the background	Pei Cobb Freed & Partners
2018	No award		
2019	Sainsbury Wing at the National Gallery; London, England	National Gallery London Sainsbury Wing	Venturi, Scott Brown and Associates
2020	Conjunctive Points-The New City; Culver City, California	The Samitaur Tower at Conjunctive Points-The New City	Eric Owen Moss Architects
2021	Burton Barr Central Library; Phoenix, Arizona	Burton Barr Central Library	Will Bruder
2022	Chapel of St. Ignatius; Seattle, Washington	Chapel of St. Ignatius	Steven Holl Architects
2023	Guggenheim Museum Bilbao; Bilbao, Spain	Guggenheim Museum Bilbao	Gehry Partners
2024	Tokyo International Forum; Tokyo, Japan	Tokyo International Forum	Rafael Viñoly Architects
2025	No award		
2026	Philip Merrill Environmental Center; Annapolis, Maryland	Tokyo International Forum	SmithGroup

== See also ==
- Stirling Prize
