= Chapel of St. Ignatius =

Jesuit chapel in Seattle, Washington, US

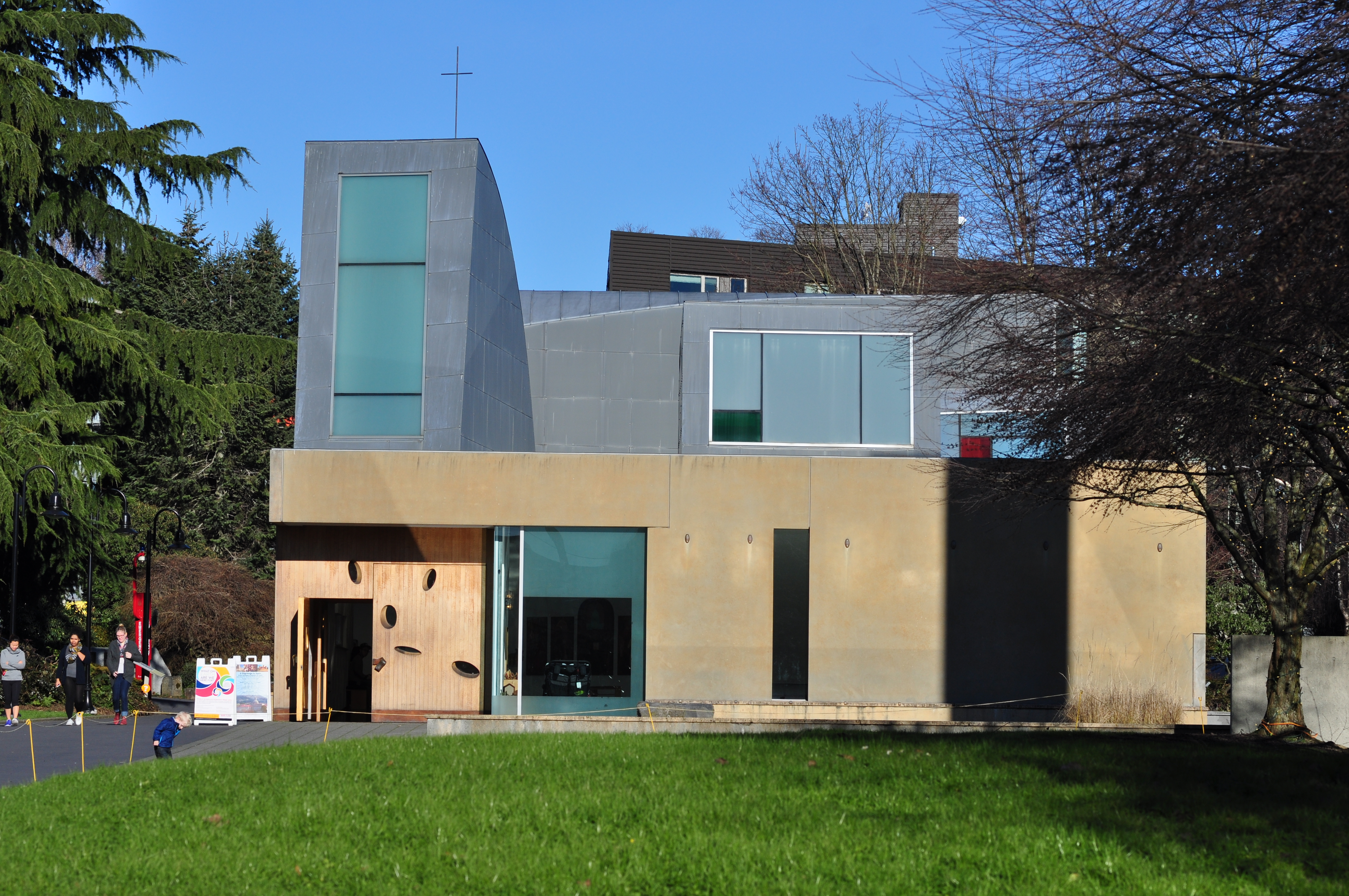
- Exterior, 2016
- Interactive map of the Chapel of St. Ignatius area

General information
- Location: Seattle, Washington, United States
- Coordinates: 47°36′41″N 122°19′5″W

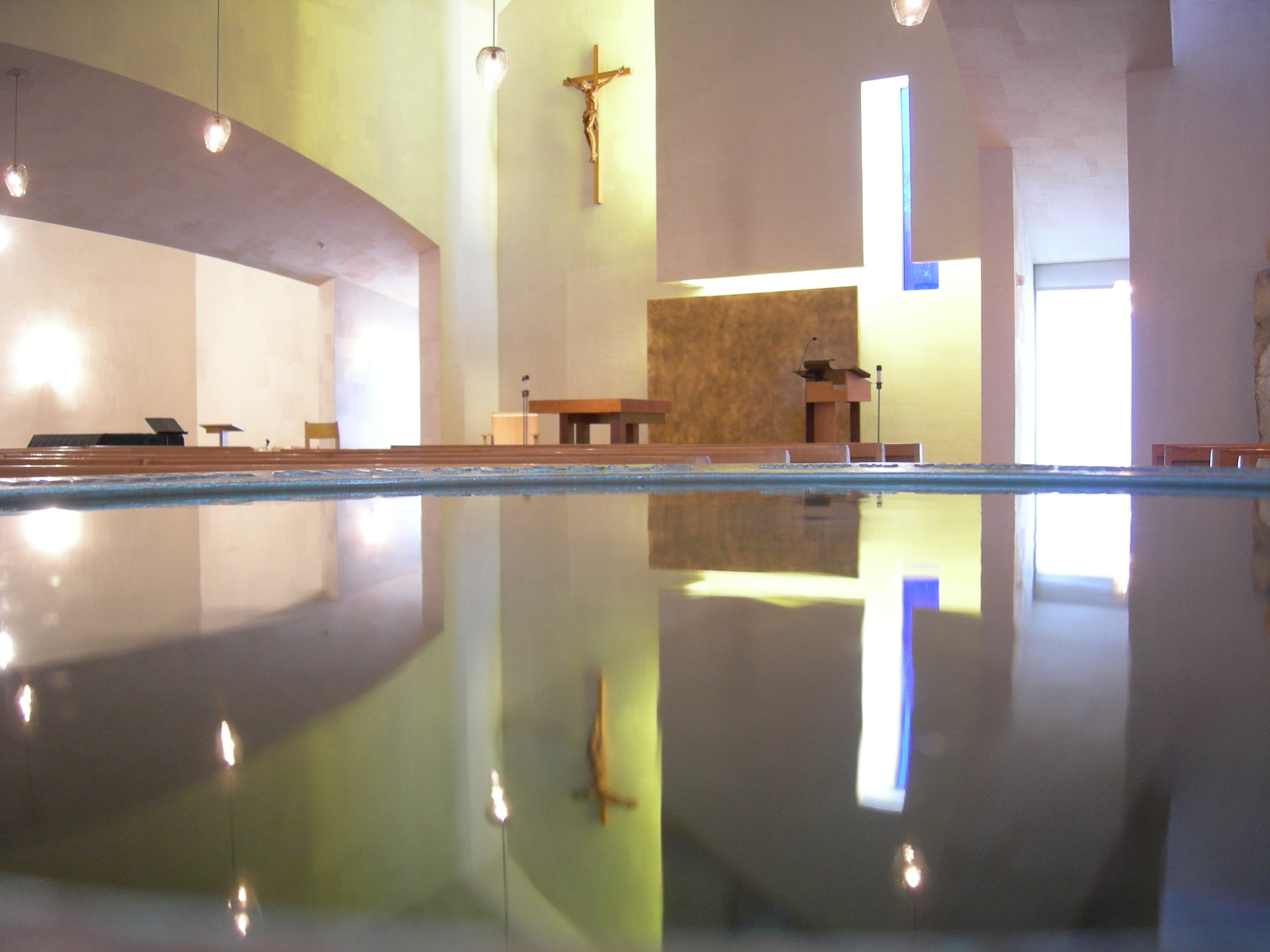
Interior of the chapel, reflected in the baptismal font.

The Chapel of St. Ignatius is a Jesuit chapel on the Seattle University campus in the U.S. state of Washington, completed in 1997. The design earned Steven Holl Architects a Twenty-five Year Award from the American Institute of Architects. A scale model of the building is in the permanent collection of the Museum of Modern Art in New York City.

Holl described his design for the chapel as "seven bottles of light in a stone box," with daylight taking on color by bouncing off colored baffles and passing through colored glass lenses. The same occurs in reverse at night, with light emanating from the building's internal illumination taking on color from the same mechanisms.

Although Holl's conception is rooted in the theology of St. Ignatius, Seattle journalist and critic Charles Mudede has described the building as "more spiritual than Christian," and has written that it is "hard to pray" there because "all one wants to do is look at the pretty lights pouring through skylights and colored windows... As at Ronchamp, the architect, not God, is worshiped in this box with bottles of light."
