= Steven Holl Architects =

Private architecture and urban design studio

Steven Holl Architects PC (SHA)
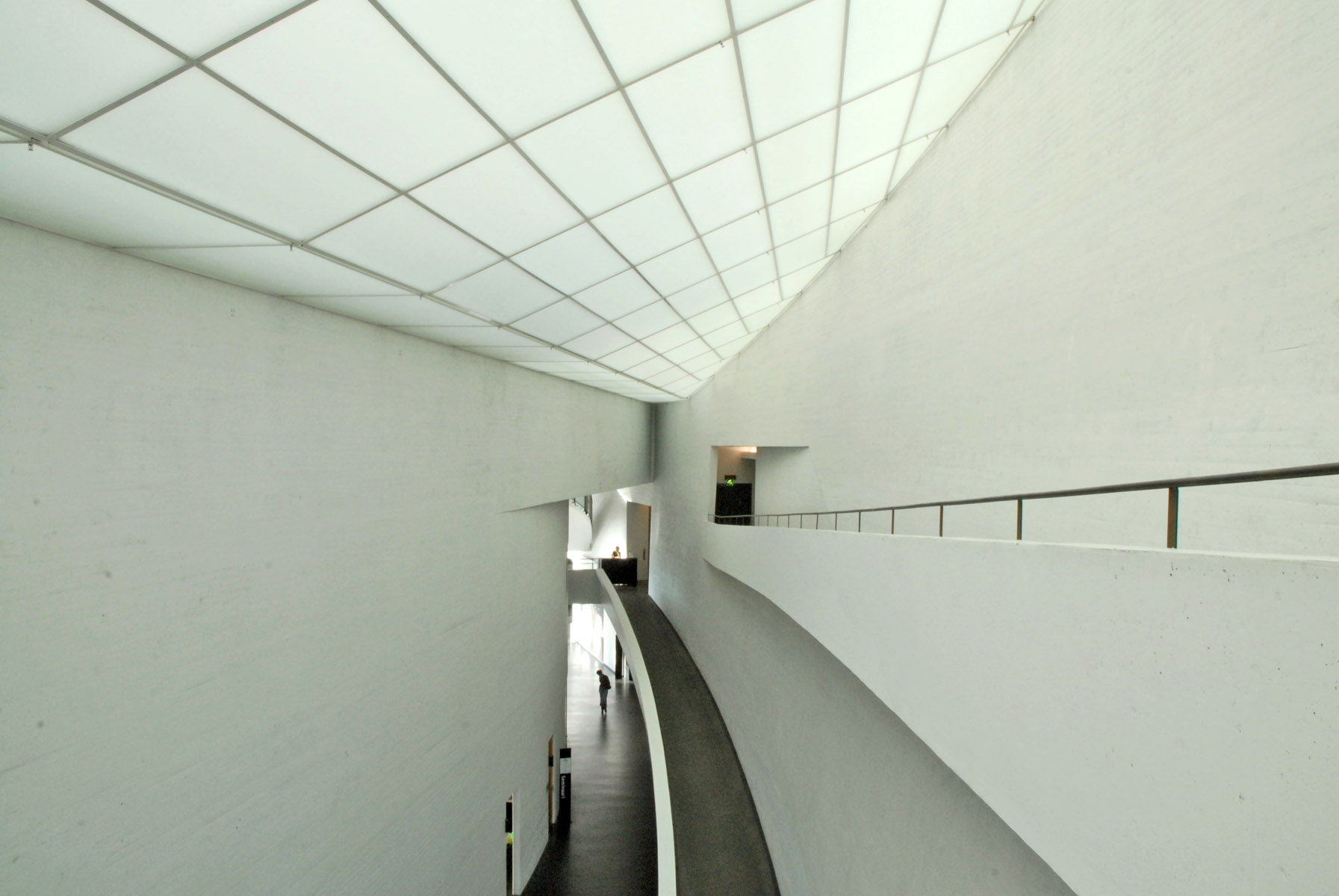

Practice information
- Firm type: Private architecture and urban design studio
- Partners: Noah Yaffe; Roberto Bannura; Olaf Schmidt
- Founders: Steven Holl
- Principals: Steven Holl; Dimitra Tsachrelia Holl
- Founded: 1977
- No. of employees: Approximately 30
- Location: New York City, US; Hudson Valley (Rhinebeck, New York), US; Beijing, China

Website
- Official website

Steven Holl Architects (SHA) is a private architecture and urban design studio founded in 1977 by Steven Holl. The practice operates from offices in New York City and the Hudson Valley in the US and Beijing in China, with a team of roughly 30 designers. Steven leads the office together with principal Dimitra Tsachrelia and partners Noah Yaffe, Roberto Bannura, and Olaf Schmidt.

== Philosophy and design process ==
Each project begins with Holl's watercolor sketches exploring light, volume, and spatial character, which evolve through physical models and iterative critiques. The firm's design philosophy is shaped collectively: Dimitra Tsachrelia leads the Hudson Valley and New York offices and contributes across academic, cultural, residential, and exhibition projects; Roberto Bannura directs the Beijing office and brings international experience across large-scale cultural and urban works; Noah Yaffe leads academic and cultural commissions as well as complex residential and mixed-use projects; Olaf Schmidt provides technical leadership in the delivery of cultural, civic, and private-sector buildings.

== Notable projects ==
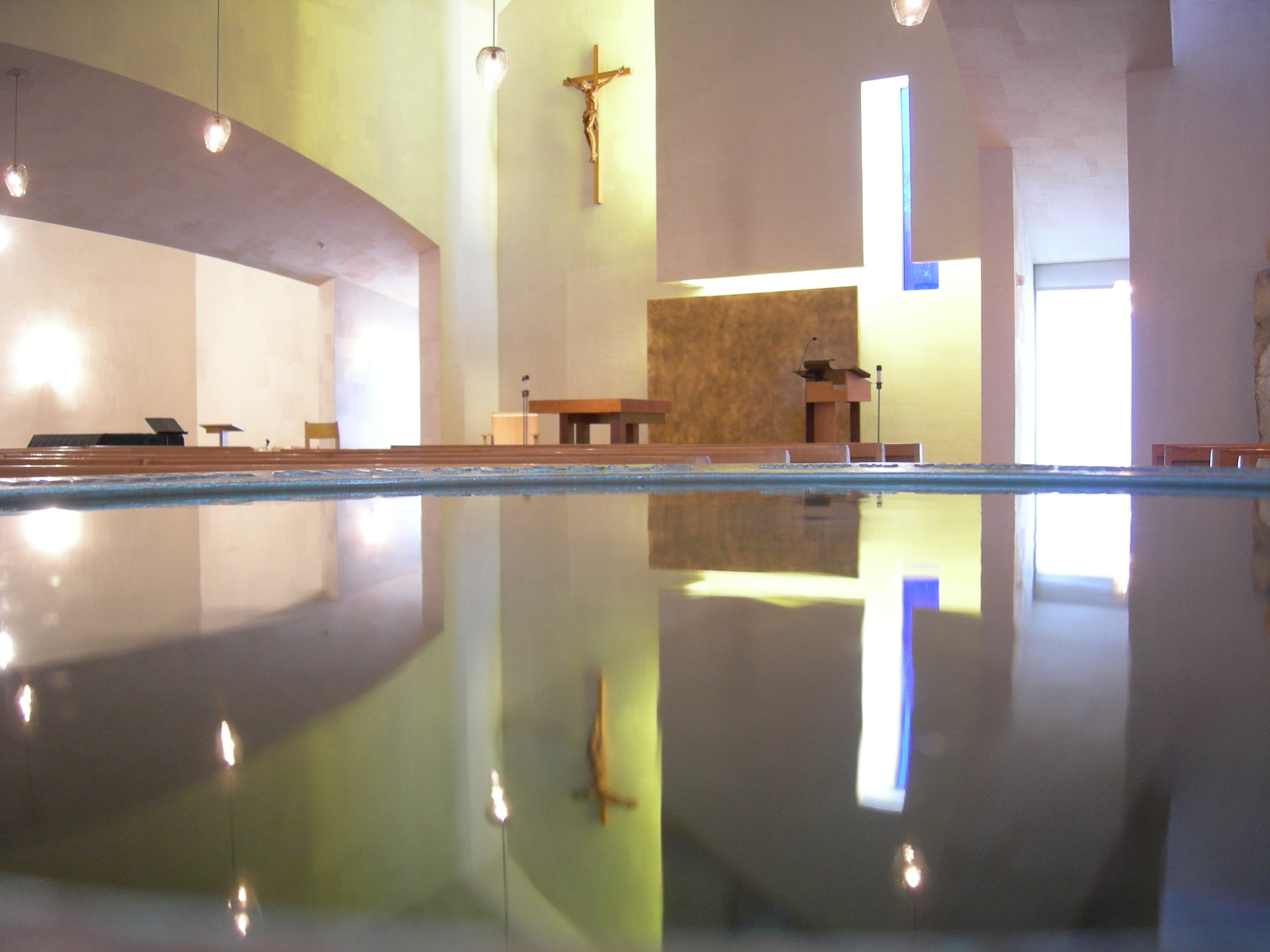
Interior of The Chapel of St. Ignatius

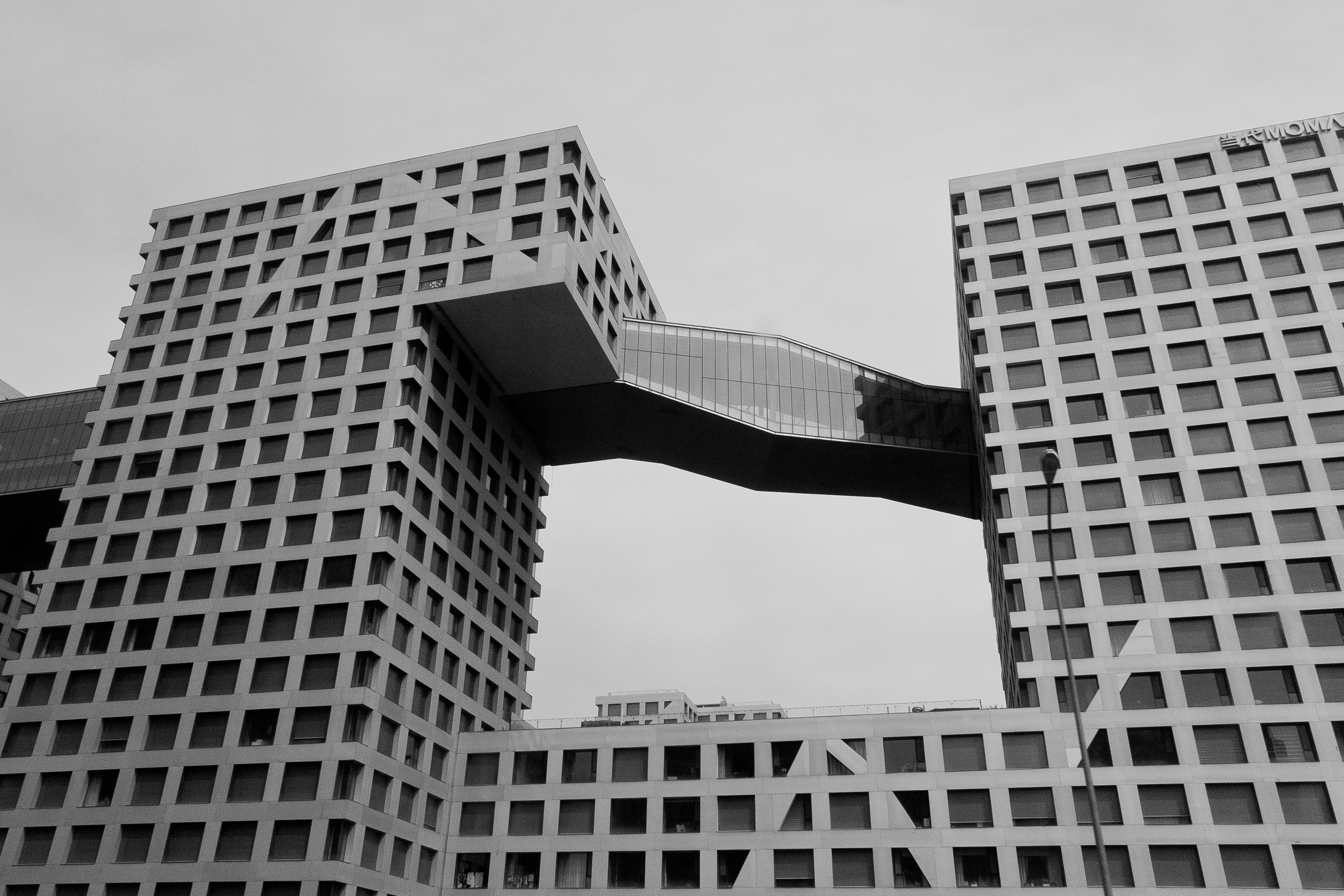
Linked Hybrid, Beijing, China

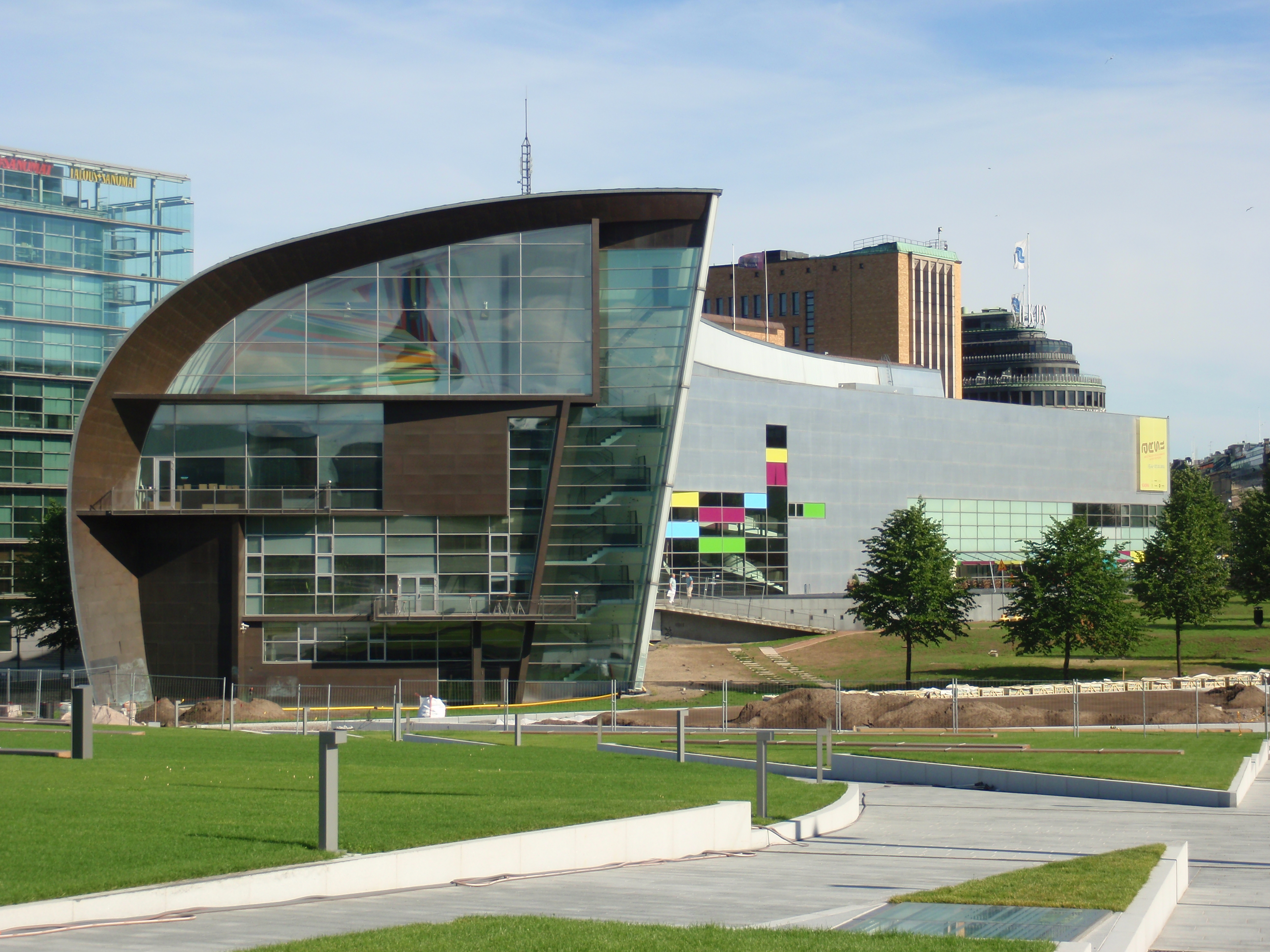
Kiasma Museum of Contemporary Art

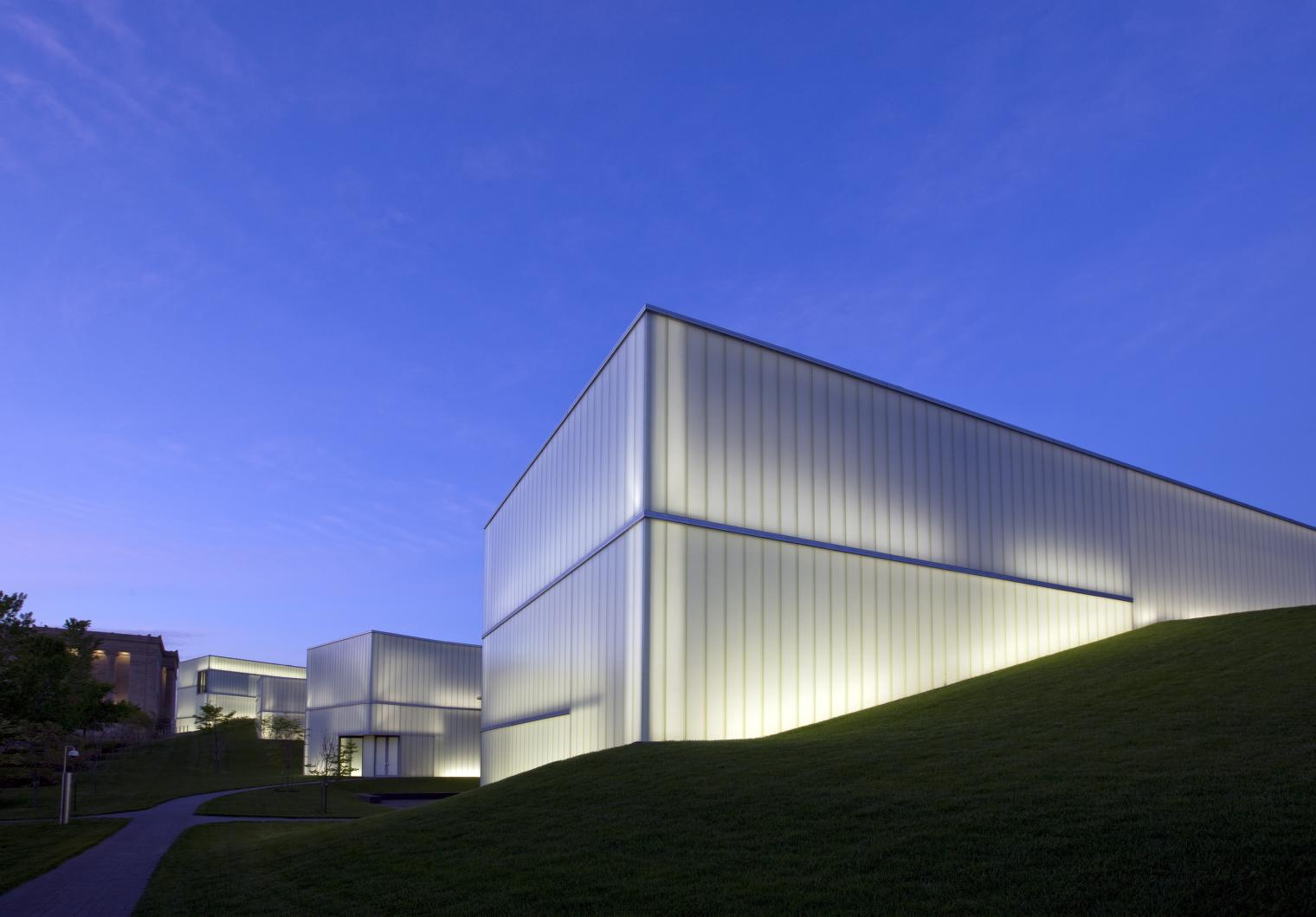
Nelson-Atkins Museum of Art, Bloch Building

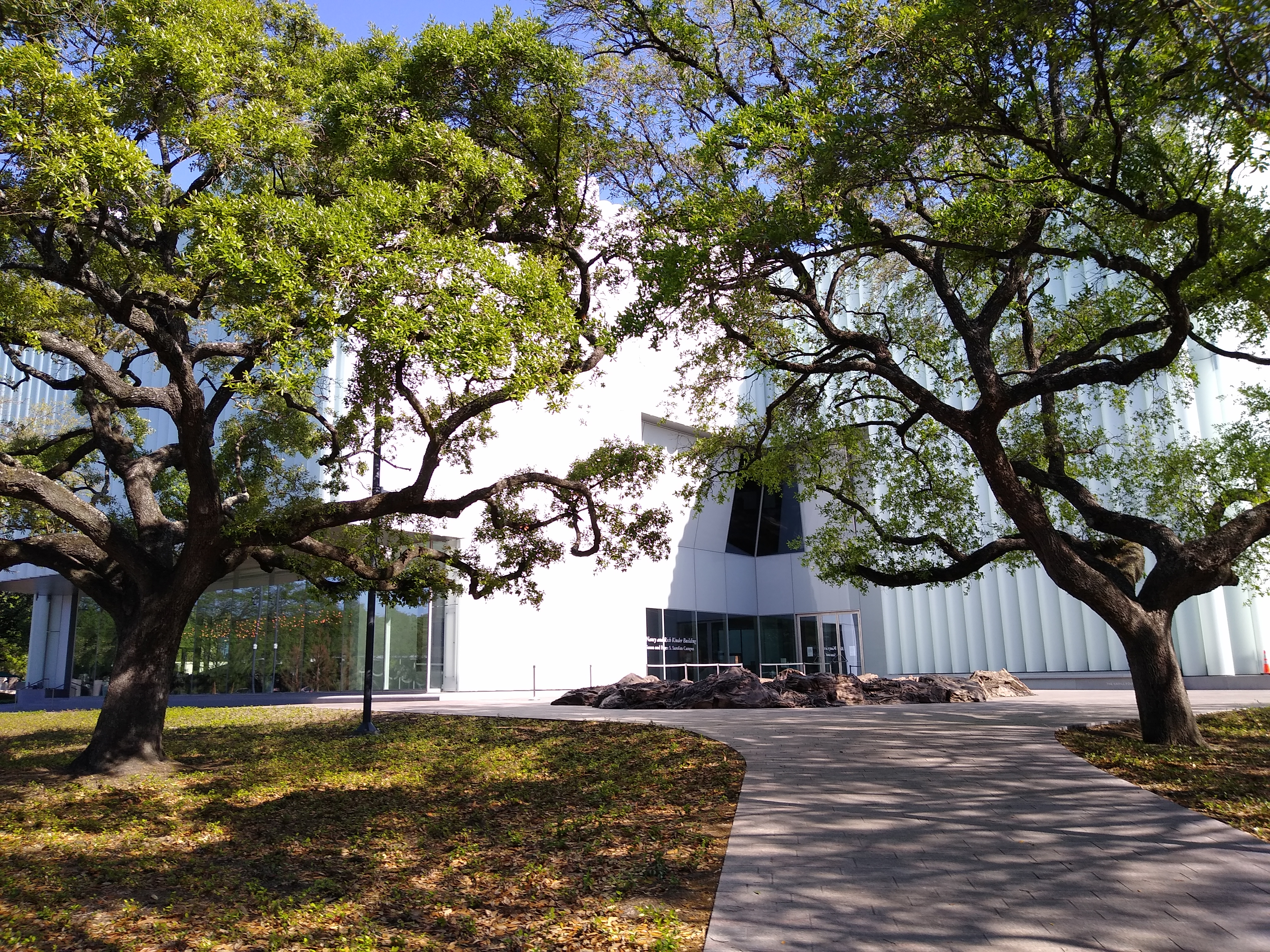
Nancy and Rich Kinder Museum Building, Museum of Fine Arts Houston (MFAH)

SHA's work includes numerous award-winning cultural and civic projects. Early milestones such as the Chapel of St. Ignatius received both a national AIA Award and the AIA Twenty-Five Year Award. Kiasma in Helsinki, the Bloch Building in Kansas City, Linked Hybrid in Beijing, The REACH at the Kennedy Center in Washington, D.C., and the Kinder Building in Houston are among the firm's internationally recognized projects.

== Recognition ==
In 2019, SHA received the AIA New York President's Award, honoring the firm's collective achievement in producing concept-driven, contextually sensitive design. In 2023, partner Roberto Bannura was awarded the Claude Françoise Brunet de Baines Medal.

== Archive ==
The Steven Myron Holl Foundation maintains an extensive archive in Rhinebeck, including more than 1,200 models, 4,400 books, 20,000 watercolors, and a wide range of drawings, materials, and correspondence documenting the full design process. Dimitra Tsachrelia serves on the board of the Steven Myron Holl Foundation.
