= Mino Caggiula =

Swiss architect

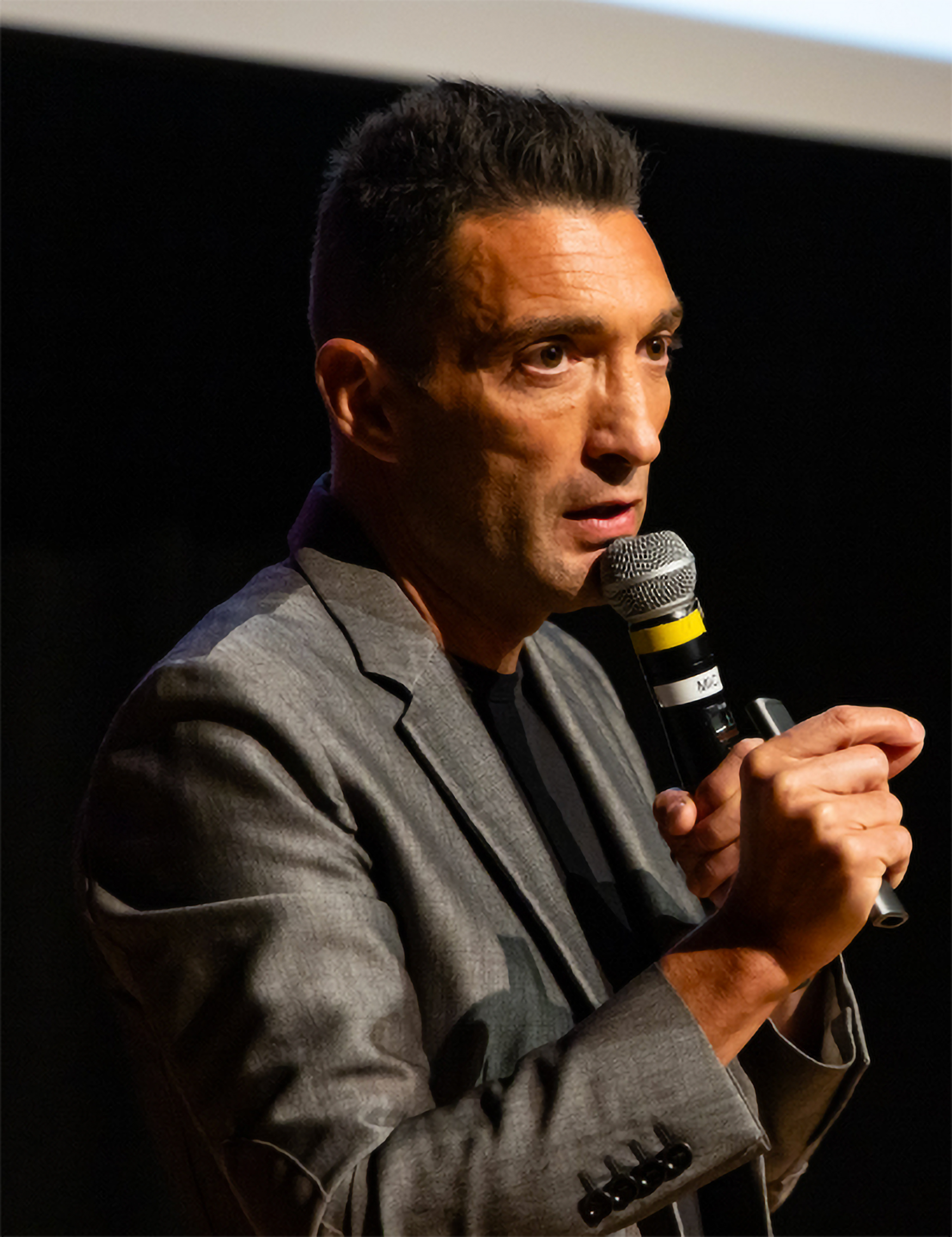
- Caggiula speaking at TASIS The American School in Switzerland (2024)
- Born: Cosimo Mino Caggiula; 1977 (age 48–49)
- Occupation: Architect
- Practice: Mino Caggiula Architects
- Website: Official website

Cosimo Mino Caggiula (born 1977) is an Italian-Swiss architect mainly active in Lugano and Milan. He is known for residential projects in Ticino including the Blade Residence in Canobbio and Nizza Paradise Residence in Paradiso.

== Career ==
Caggiula studied at the Mendrisio Academy of Architecture (USI). Early in his career he worked in the United States with Steven Holl. He later established his practice in Lugano and Milan; the company was incorporated in Switzerland in 2014 as Mino Caggiula Architects SA.

== Notable works ==
- Blade Residence (Canobbio, Switzerland). Residential complex characterized by curved weathering steel partitions.
- Nizza Paradise Residence (Paradiso, Switzerland).
- Atelier Alice Trepp (Origlio, Switzerland). Artist's studio for sculptor Alice Trepp.
- Paguro Residence (Lugano, Switzerland). Expansion of a late-nineteenth-century villa.

== Awards and recognition ==
- Architecture MasterPrize (2023) for the Blade Residence.
- International Design Awards (IDA) Gold, Architecture category, for the Blade Residence (2023).
- BLT Built Design Awards (2023), Blade Residence listed among category winners.
- Outstanding Property Award London (OPAL) Platinum, for the Blade Residence (2023).

== Publications ==
- Open Being: Mino Caggiula Architects (The Plan Editions, 2021).
