= L'Observatoire International =

Lighting design firm

- Industry: Lighting design firm
- Founded: 1993
- Founder: Hervé Descottes
- Headquarters: New York City, New York, Paris, London, Seoul
- Number of locations: 4
- Area served: Worldwide
- Number of employees: 40
- Website: www.lobsintl.com

L'Observatoire International is a lighting design firm established by Hervé Descottes in 1993 in New York City. The firm works within a range of different spatial expressions including architecture, landscape, urban, and fine art projects.

L'Observatoire has become known for its innovative ways of applying light within the built environment, and does so by merging the latest technologies with an aesthetic paradigm in order to most advantageously engage and reveal the program, space, and form. The firm has collaborated with architects and designers including Steven Holl, Frank Gehry, Diller Scofidio + Renfro, Jean Nouvel, Richard Meier, Peter Marino.

In July 2025, L'Observatoire International opened an office in London, expanding the studio's presence beyond its established offices in New York, Paris, and Seoul.

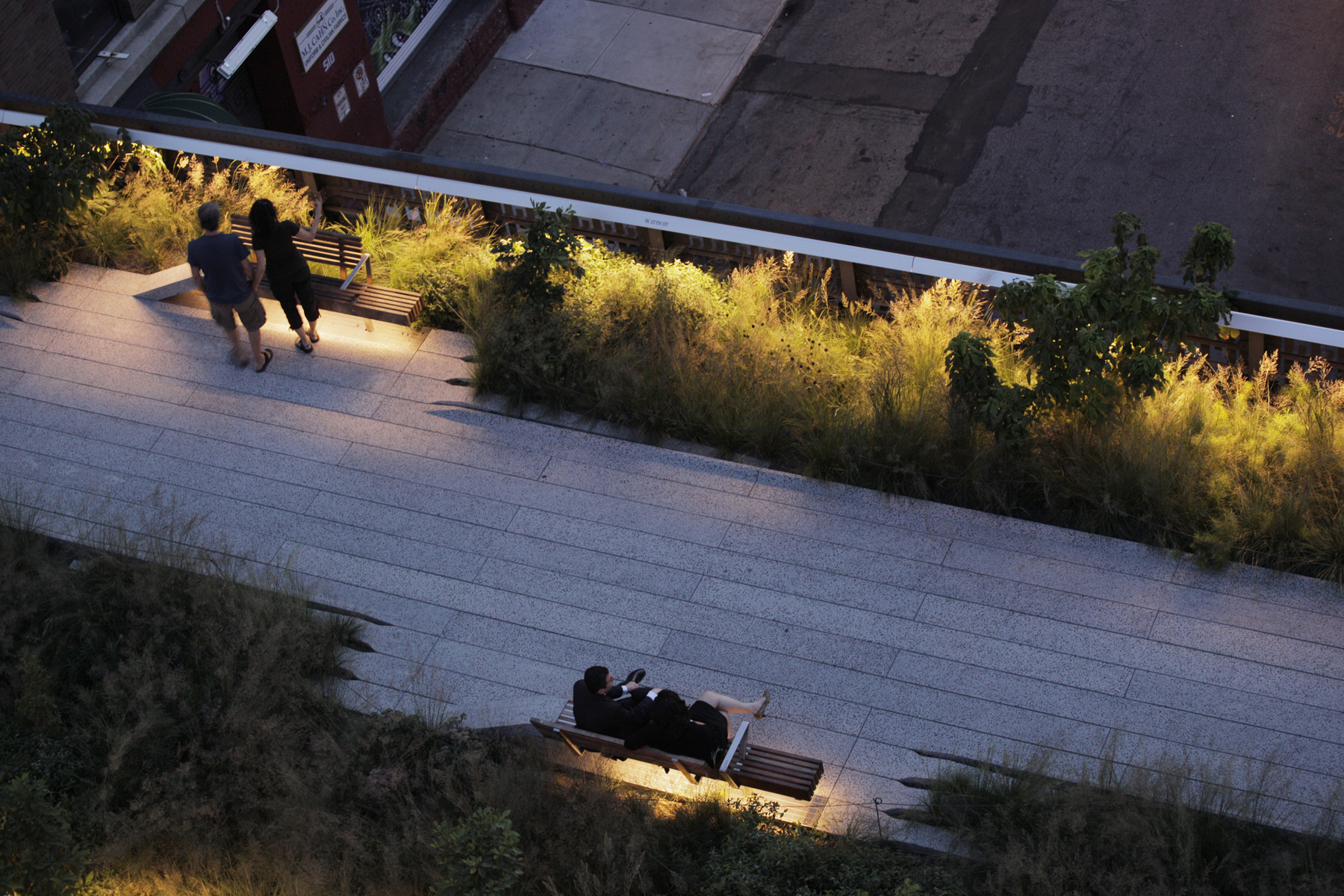
The High Line in NYC, with lighting design by L'Observatoire International

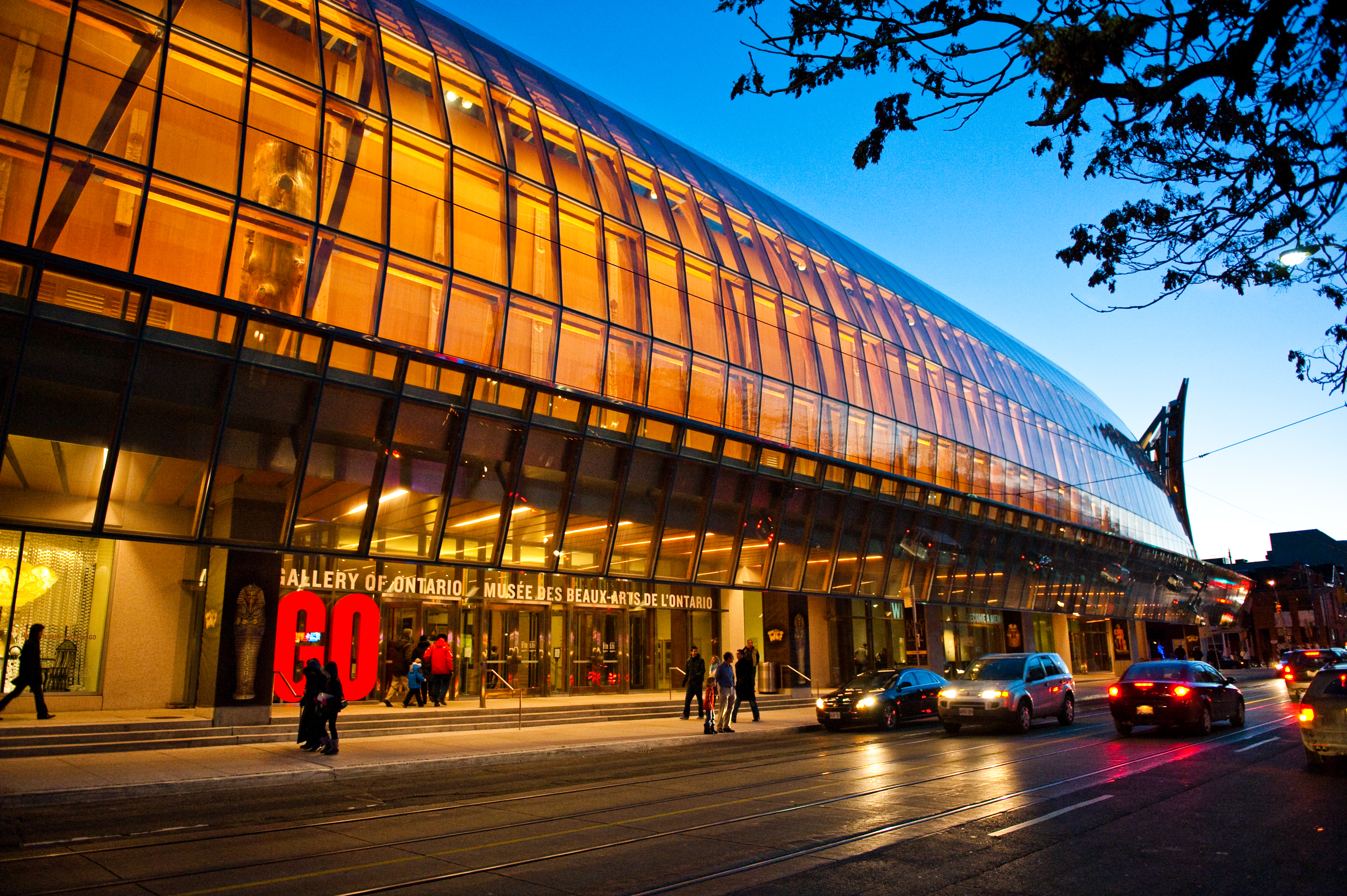
The Art Gallery of Ontario, with lighting design by L'Observatoire International

== Recent notable works ==
- Guggenheim Abu Dhabi, Gehry Partners, LLP, Abu Dhabi (2026)
- Marcel, at the Breuer Building, New York NY, USA (2026)
- Fondation Cartier pour l'Art Contemporain, Paris, France (2025)
- National Gallery's Sainsbury Wing, London, UK (2025)
- Le Grand Café, at Le Grand Palais, Paris, France (2025)
- Central Presbyterian Church, New York NY, USA (2025)
- Faena New York, New York NY, USA (2025)
- The Frick Collection, New York NY, USA (2025)
- Bloomberg Student Center, at The Johns Hopkins University, Baltimore MD, USA (2025)
- Printemps New York, New York NY, USA (2025)
- Clemente Bar, New York NY, USA (2024)
- Locanda Verde Hudson Yards, New York NY, USA (2024)
- South Street Seaport, New York NY, USA (2024)
- La Tête d'Or, New York NY, USA (2024)
- Azabudai Hills, Tokyo, Japan (2024)
- Transamerica Pyramid, Foster and Partners, San Francisco, CA, USA (2024)
- Coqodaq, Rockwell Group, New York NY, USA (2024)
- Harrods Facade, London, UK (2024)
- Blanton Museum of Art Grounds, Austin TX, USA (2024)
- Korean Cultural Center New York, New York NY, USA (2024)
- Lindemann Performing Arts Center at Brown University, REX (architecture firm), Providence, RI, USA (2023)
- De Durgerdam Boutique Hotel, K&P Architekten, Buro Belen, Amsterdam, Netherlands (2023)
- The Schwarzman Center at Yale University, Robert A.M. Stern Architects, LLP, New Haven, CT, USA (2022)
- LUMA Arles, Gehry Partners, LLP, Arles, France (2021)
- Audrey Irmas Pavilion, Office for Metropolitan Architecture, Los Angeles, CA, USA (2021)
- Winter Visual Arts Center of Franklin & Marshall College, Steven Holl Architects, Lancaster, PA, USA (2020)
- Dwight D. Eisenhower Memorial, Gehry Partners, LLP, Washington, DC (2020)
- The Nancy and Rich Kinder Building of the Museum of Fine Arts, Houston, Steven Holl Architects, Houston, TX, USA (2020)
- National Museum of Qatar, Ateliers Jean Nouvel, Doha, Qatar (2019)
- Vessel (structure), Heatherwick Studio, New York NY, USA (2019)
- The REACH of the John F. Kennedy Center for the Performing Arts, Steven Holl Architects, Washington DC, USA (2019)
- Château de Malleret Chai, Dubuisson Architecture, Le Pian-Médoc, France (2018)
- Le Louvre, Pyramid Renovation, Dubuisson Architecture, Paris, France (2018)
- Institute for Contemporary Art, Richmond, Steven Holl Architects, Richmond, VA, USA (2018)
- The Grill at Seagram Building, in collaboration with designer William T. Georgis, New York NY, USA (2017)
- Faena Hotel Miami Beach, Bazmark, Miami, FL, USA (2015)
- Philharmonie de Paris, Ateliers Jean Nouvel, Paris, France (2015)
- Seamarq Hotel, Richard Meier Partners, Gengneung, South Korea (2015)
- House of Dior Seoul, Peter Marino Architects, Christian de Partzamparc, Seoul, South Korea (2015)
- Metropolitan Museum of Art, Olin Partnership, New York NY, USA (2014)
- Aspen Art Museum, Shigeru Ban Architects, Aspen, CO, USA (2014)
- Fondation Louis Vuitton, Gehry Partners, LLP, Paris, France (2014)
- Hotel Bayerischer Hof, Munich, Agence Jouin Manku, Munich, Germany (2014)
- Fendi Avenue Montaigne, Curiosity, Paris, France (2014)
- Viña Vik, Smijan Radic, Millahue, Chile (2014)
- Conrad Hotel, KPF, New York, NY, USA (2012)
- Daeyang Gallery & Guesthouse, Steven Holl Architects, Seoul, Korea (2012)
- Museum of the Moving Image, Leeser Architecture, Queens, NY (2011)
- Cite de l'Ocean et du Surf, Steven Holl Architects, Biarritz, France (2011)
- Beekman Tower, Gehry Partners, LLP, New York, NY (2011)
- Virginia Museum of Fine Arts, Rick Mather Architects + SMBW, Richmond, VA (2011)
- Steel Stacks Campus, Wallace Roberts & Todd, Bethlehem, PA (2011)
- Vanke Center, Steven Holl Architects, Shenzhen, China (2011)
- Taikoo Place, Wong & Ouyang, Hong Kong, China (2010)
- Marc Jacobs Tokyo, Stephan Jakitsch Architects, Tokyo, Japan (2010)
- Hermes Rive Gauche, Rene Dumas, Architecture Interieure, Paris, France (2010)
- ABC Kitchen, Jan Burtz, Jim Denney, Eric Slayton, New York, NY (2010)
- Les Lalanne, Musee de Arts Decoratifs, Peter Marino Architects, Paris, France (2010)
- Lincoln Center Redevelopment: Alice Tully Hall, Diller, Scorfidio + Renfro, New York, NY (2009)
- The High Line, Field Operations, New York, NY (2009)
- The Standard Hotel, Polshek Partnership Architects, New York, NY (2009)
- Juilliard School Expansion, Diller Scofidio + Renfro, New York, NY, USA (2008)
- Art Gallery of Ontario, Gehry Partners, LLP, Toronto, Canada (2008)
- Newtown Creek Wastewater Treatment Plant, Polshek Partnership (now Ennead Architects), Brooklyn, NY (2008)
- The Pink Project: Make It Right Foundation, Graft, Founder: Brad Pitt, New Orleans, LA (2008)
- Louis Vuitton Foundation for Creation, Gehry Partners, LLP, Paris, France (2008)
- Lou Ruvo Center for Brain Health, Gehry Partners, LLP, Las Vegas, NV (2008)
- Novartis, Gehry Partners, LLP, Basel, Switzerland (2008)
- The French Presidency of the European Union, Agence Sylvain Dubuisson, Brussels, Belgium (2007)
- Vivocity, Toyo Ito & Associates, Singapore (2007)
- Musée des Arts Décoratifs, Sylvain Dubuisson, Paris, France (2007)
- Guthrie Theater, Atelier Jean Nouvel, Minneapolis, MN (2006)
- Buffalo Bayou: Sabine to Bagby Promenade, SWA Group, Houston, TX (2006)
- Bronx Museum, Architectonica, New York, NY (2006)
- Columbus Circle, Olin Partnership, New York, NY (2005)
- Sculptural Ensemble of Constantin Brâncuși at Târgu Jiu, OLIN, Târgu Jiu, Romania (2004)
- Leeum Samsung Museum of Art, Atelier Jean Nouvel, OMA/Rem Koolhas, Seoul, Korea (2004)
- Walt-Disney Concert Hall, Frank O. Gehry & Associates, Los Angeles, CA (2003)
- Richard B. Fisher Center for the Performing Arts, Frank O. Gehry & Associates, Annandale-On-Hudson, NY, USA (2003)
- Bellevue Arts Museum, Steven Holl Architects, Bellevue, WA (2001)
- Langston Hughes Library, Maya lin Studio, Clinton, TN (2000)
- Kiasma Museum of Contemporary Art, Steven Holl Architects, Helsinki, Finland (1998)
- Cranbrook Institute of Science, Steven Holl Architects, Bloomfield Hills, MI (1998)
- Chapel of St. Ignatius, Steven Holl Architects, Seattle, WA, USA (1997)

== Awards ==
- 2026 - American Academy of Arts and Letters Award in Architecture
- 2026 - Architizer Award Special Mention for Bloomberg Student Center, at The Johns Hopkins University, Baltimore, MD, USA
- 2026 - Architizer Award Special Mention for The Frick Collection, New York NY, USA
- 2026 - Architizer Award Special Mention for Faena New York, New York NY, USA
- 2026 - Illuminating Engineering Institute of Japan (IEJ) Good Lighting Award for Azabudai Hills, Tokyo, Japan
- 2026 - IES Illumination Award of Merit for The Frick Collection, New York NY, USA
- 2026 - IES Illumination Award of Merit for Bloomberg Student Center, at The Johns Hopkins University, Baltimore, MD, USA
- 2026 - IES Illumination Award of Merit for Printemps New York, New York NY, USA
- 2025 - Best of Year Interior Design, Large Retail Winner, for Printemps New York, New York NY, USA
- 2025 - Architect's Newspaper Best of Design Honorable Mention for Transamerica Pyramid, San Francisco, CA, USA
- 2025 - Dezeen Award, Architectural Lighting Design of the Year, for Hermès’s Collections at Milan Design Week, Milan, Italy
- 2025 - LIT Award Visitor Experience & Museum Exhibition Winner for Hermès’s Collections at Milan Design Week, Milan, Italy
- 2025 - LIT Award Retail Lighting Winner for Printemps New York, New York NY, USA
- 2025 - LIT Award Bar & Restaurant Winner for Le Grand Café, at Le Grand Palais, Paris, France
- 2025 - LIT Award Bar & Restaurant Winner for Clemente Bar, New York NY, USA
- 2025 - Beacon Award of Excellence, Retail Lighting Design, for Printemps New York, New York NY, USA
- 2025 - Beacon Award of Excellence, Commercial Interior Lighting Design, for Transamerica Pyramid, San Francisco, CA, USA
- 2025 - AIA New York Design Award of Merit in Architecture, for Lindemann Performing Arts Center at Brown University, Providence, RI, USA
- 2025 - AIA New York Design Award of Honor in Urban Design, for Blanton Museum of Art Grounds, Austin TX, USA
- 2025 - AIA New York Design Award, Citation for Biodiversity, for Google NYC at St. John’s Terminal
- 2025 - Design Educates Award, Silver Prize in Architectural Design, for Lindemann Performing Arts Center at Brown University, Providence, RI, USA
- 2025 - IES Illumination Award of Merit for Coqodaq, New York NY, USA
- 2025 - NYCxDesign Award, Shining Moment, for Korean Cultural Center New York, New York NY, USA
- 2025 - IALD Award of Merit for Transamerica Pyramid, San Francisco, CA, USA
- 2025 - Illuminating Engineering Institute of Japan (IEJ) Good Lighting Award for Toranomon Hills Station Tower, Tokyo, Japan
- 2024 - Best of Year Interior Design, Shining Moment, for Lindemann Performing Arts Center at Brown University, Providence, RI, USA
- 2024 - LIT Award Bar & Restaurant Winner for Coqodaq, New York NY, USA
- 2024 - LIT Award Cultural Building Winner for Lindemann Performing Arts Center at Brown University, Providence, RI, USA
- 2024 - IES Illumination Award of Merit for Audemars Piguet House New York, New York NY, USA
- 2023 - LIT Award Fashion Design Lighting, for Hermès’s Collections at Milan Design Week, Milan, Italy
- 2023 - LIT Award Cultural Building Lighting Design, for Museum of Tolerance Jerusalem, Jerusalem, Israel.
- 2023 - LIT Award Bar and Restaurant Lighting Design, for Tin Building by Jean-Georges, New York NY, USA
- 2023 - Architect's Newspaper Best of Practice Award Winner Lighting Design Firm Northeast
- 2023 - IES Illumination Award of Merit for The Schwarzman Center at Yale University, New Haven, CT, USA
- 2023 - LUMEN Award of Excellence, for Tin Building by Jean-Georges, New York NY, USA
- 2023 - IES Illumination Award of Merit for Tin Building by Jean-Georges, New York NY, USA
- 2023 - IALD Award of Merit for The Schwarzman Center at Yale University, New Haven, CT, USA
- 2023 - Architizer Award, Architect + Light, Popular Choice, for The Schwarzman Center at Yale University, New Haven, CT, USA
- 2022 - American Institute of Architects Los Angeles, Building of the Year Award for Audrey Irmas Pavilion, Office for Metropolitan Architecture, Los Angeles, CA, USA
- 2022 - Architect's Newspaper Best of Design Honorable Mention for Hermès’s Collections at Milan Design Week, Milan, Italy
- 2022 - LUMEN Award of Merit, for Winter Visual Arts Center of Franklin & Marshall College, Lancaster, PA, USA
- 2022 - LIT Award Design of the Year, for Hermès’s Collections at Milan Design Week, Milan, Italy
- 2022 - Best of Year Interior Design, for Hermès’s Collections at Milan Design Week, Milan, Italy
- 2022 - Best of Year Interior Design, for The Schwarzman Center at Yale University, New Haven, CT, USA
- 2022 - IES Illumination Award of Merit for Audrey Irmas Pavilion, Office for Metropolitan Architecture, Los Angeles, CA, USA
- 2021 - LIT Award for Dwight D. Eisenhower Memorial, Gehry Partners, LLP, Washington, DC
- 2021 - IES Illumination Award of Merit for The Nancy and Rich Kinder Building of the Museum of Fine Arts, Houston, Houston, TX, USA
- 2021 - IES Illumination Award of Merit for the British Galleries at the MET, New York NY, USA
- 2021 - IES Illumination Award of Merit for Winter Visual Arts Center of Franklin & Marshall College, Lancaster, PA, USA
- 2021 - NYCxDesign Award, Shining Moment, forThe Edge Observation Desk at 30 Hudson Yards, New York NY, USA
- 2016 - Architizer Award for Fondation Louis Vuitton (Paris, France)
- 2015 - IES Illumination Award for The Metropolitan of Arts (New York, USA)
- 2014 - Global Awards for Excellence for Steel Stacks Campus (Bethlehem, PA)
- 2014 - Architizer Award for The High Line (New York, USA)
- 2014 - Lumen Award for Les Haras Strasbourg (Strasbourg, France)
- 2014 - IES Illumination Award for Private Residence in Fire Island (Fire Island, USA)
- 2014 - IES Illumination Award for Lafayette Grand Cafe (New York, USA)
- 2014 - IES Illumination Award for Les Haras Strasbourg (Strasbourg, France)
- 2013 - IES Illumination Award for Le Ciel de Paris (Paris, France)
- 2013 - IES Illumination Award for Conrad Hotel (New York, NY)
- 2013 - IES Illumination Award for Daeyang House and Gallery (Seoul, South Korea)
- 2013 - IES Illumination Award for Vintry Fine Wines (New York, NY)
- 2013 - IES Illumination Award for the Virgin Atlantic JFK Clubhouse (New York, NY)
- 2013 - IALD Award awarded to Cite du Surf et de L'Ocean (Biarritz, France)
- 2013 - GE Edison Award (highest honor) for Vintry Fine Wines (New York, NY)
- Lumen Award of Merit awarded to the following projects: Cite du Surf et de L'Ocean (Biarritz, France) and The High Line (New York, NY) (2012)
- IALD Award of Special Citation for Sensitive Application of Light in a Repurposed Urban Setting for The High Line (New York, NY) (2012)
- IES Illuminations award of Merit Awarded to the following projects: The Cosmopolitan (Las Vegas, NV), Hermes Rive Gauche (Paris, France), Cite du Surf et de L'Ocean (Biarritz, France), and The High Line (New York, NY) (2012)
- Wan Awards Retail Interior Award for RDAI's Hermes Store (Paris, France) (2011)
- Municipal Arts Society's Masterworks Award Best Restoration for the Queens Theatre in the Park (Queens, NY) (2011)
- Lumen Award of Merit for Lincoln Center Redevelopment: Alice Tully Hall and the Juilliard School (New York, NY) and Private Residence (Kuala Lumpur, Malaysia) (2010)
- World Architecture News Award in Civic Building Category for the New York Korea Cultural Center (New York, NY)(2010)
- IES Illuminations award of Merit Awarded to the following projects: Newton Creek Waste Water Pollution Treatment Plant (New York, NY), The High Line (New York, NY), and Lincoln Center Redevelopment: Alice Tully Hall and the Juilliard School (New York, NY)(2010)
- Best Redesign awarded by The Municipal Art Society of New York Awarded to the following projects: Lincoln Center Redevelopment: Alice Tully Hall (New York, NY) and The High Line (New York, NY)(2010)
- Commendable Achievement Exterior Lighting from Architectural Lighting Magazine's Sixth Annual Light and Architecture Design Awards for Newtown Creek Wastewater Treatment Plant (Brooklyn, NY)(2009
- ASLA Design Excellence Award for Buffalo Bayou: Sabine to Bagby Promenade (Houston, TX)(2009)
- Chevalier des Arts et LettresKnight of Arts and Letters Award administered by the Minister of Culture and the Government of France (2008)
- Award of Merit from the American Institute of Architects (AIA) for Theory World Headquarters and Retail Flagship (New York, NY)(2008)
- Yellow Pencil Award from D&AD (British Design and Art Direction) for Environmental Design/Installation for the Make It Right Foundation's Pink Project with Graft as architect (New Orleans, LA)(2008)
- Award of Excellence from the American Society of Landscape Architects for the Buffalo Bayou: Sabine to Bagby Promenade (Houston, TX)(2007)
- General Design Award of Honor from ASLA for Columbus Circle (New York, NY)(2006)
- Institute Honor from Collaborative Achievement in Design American Institute of Architects (AIA)(2003)
- Award for Excellence in Design from the Art Commission of New York City for the exterior lighting of the P.S.1 Contemporary Art Center in Long Island City (New York, NY) (2003)

== Book Publications ==
- Descottes, Hervé; Cecilia E. Ramos (2011). Architectural Lighting, Designing with Light and Space. New York: Princeton Architectural Press. ISBN 978-1-56898-938-9.
- Descottes, Hervé (2005). Ultimate Lighting Design. Italy: TeNeues. ISBN 3-8327-9016-0.
