= Adam Sokol =

American architect

- Born: New York, NY
- Education: Columbia University; Yale School of Architecture
- Occupation: Architect
- Awards: Architectural Record Vanguard; NYCxDesign, American Institute of Architects Awards, Architizer Award
- Practice: asap/
- Website: www.asap.pro

Adam Sokol is an American architect and founder of the Adam Sokol Architecture Practice (asap/). Considered one of the leading architects of his generation, he is known for implementing a sophisticated geometry to his designs that draws from ancient and classical architecture.

== Early life ==
Sokol grew up in New York State. He was inspired by studying ancient Mayan, Indian, Egyptian, and Roman architecture.

== Career ==
From 2006 - 2011, Sokol was an assistant professor of architecture at the University at Buffalo. The majority of his designs integrate architecture into the fabric of historic city layouts. Examples include the X-House in Beijing, China featured in Architectural Digest, the highrise Spring Street Hotel in Los Angeles, and the Emperor Hotel Qianmen.

In 2019, Sokol was awarded the Architectural Record Design Vanguard award, and in 2023 he was named a NYCxDesign award winner for his XL House at Columbus Circle in Manhattan. He is a registered architect in New York and California and a member of the American Institute of Architects (AIA), and also the recipient of multiple AIA awards.

His "Allen Apartments" project in Buffalo, NY was described by a senior city planner as “perhaps the best example of the Green Code at work” and “one of the best new buildings in Buffalo.” Bloomberg CityLab describes the project as "symbol of a new era for Buffalo — an innovative, multiunit residential building constructed in a historic district, without a single zoning variance." The project, recognized with design awards in Los Angeles and New York, was also described by Architectural Record as "deftly inserted...with contextual massing and straightforward, well-detailed materials."

His headquarters for Zhen Fund, a noted venture capital firm based in Beijing, was completed in 2021, received numerous accolades and publications worldwide, including awards from Architizer and Interior Design magazine. Featuring a lyrical geometry derived from parabolas, the space was described as "ethereal" by Wallpaper* magazine and "simple yet effective...flipping convention on its head" by Frame.

His firm created the "Skid Grow" project which reimagines Skid Row, Los Angeles as a neighborhood with a 115 acre elevated park and executing the best land use policies to create meaningful affordable housing in Southern California.

His work has been featured in The New York Times and publications by Rizzoli, among others. Sokol's buildings were also featured at the Museum of the City of New York.

=== Current Projects ===
Recent and forthcoming work includes residential, commercial, multifamily residential, and institutional projects in California, Washington (state), Colorado, and New York (state) and South Carolina.

== Education ==
Sokol earned a Bachelor of Arts from Columbia University followed by a Master of Architecture with from Yale University. At Columbia he studied with noted historians Barry Bergdoll and Kenneth Frampton, and then with Robert A. M. Stern, Vincent Scully, Demetri Porphyrios and Frank Gehry at Yale. Sokol has also studied at Harvard University and the Sorbonne University in Paris, France.
