= Silence Please (company) =

Speaker design studio and hi-fi listening space

- Interactive map of Silence Please

General information
- Location: 132 Bowery Floor 2, Manhattan, New York, United States
- Coordinates: 40.7189°N 73.9949°W

Silence Please is a speaker design studio and hi-fi listening space located in the Bowery of Manhattan in New York City.

== Space ==
Silence Please's Bowery hi-li listening space includes "one, long loft" featuring a showroom and sitting area, as well as a Duty Free Records shop and a tea shop behind it. In addition to Silence Please's speakers, it also includes interior pieces by Graine Studio and artworks by artists like Frédéric Heurlier Cimolai.

The hi-fi listening space also supports events with musicians. In June 2025, it hosted a listening session with Brian Eno and Beatie Wolfe, both of whom debuted their respective new albums there. In July, it hosted TOKI-O Nights, a "tasting and listening experience" in collaboration with Suntory to pay homage "to Tokyo’s famed izakayas and cultural space." During NYCxDesign, it presented Silent Matters, a modern reinterpretation of the Japanese tea ceremony "through contemporary sound, light and movement."

The studio told Dezeen that "The primary inspiration behind our design was to create a physical space in the heart of New York City that offers a deeper connection to sound, providing a place of unity through listening and discovery."

== Speakers ==
Silence Please designs speakers. Some were shown at the Collectible design fair in Europe in 2024.
