= Katherine Bergeron =

American academic administrator

Katherine Bergeron (born 1958) is an American musicologist and academic administrator. She was the 11th President of Connecticut College in New London, Connecticut from January 1, 2014 to June 30, 2023, when she resigned after complaints about "administrative overreach, micromanagement and lack of transparency".

== Early life and education ==
Bergeron was born in New London, Connecticut, in 1958. She earned a bachelor of arts degree in music from Wesleyan University and master and doctoral degrees in music from Cornell University.

== Career ==
Bergeron's scholarship has focused on French music and culture of the late 19th and early 20th centuries. Bergeron has held professorships at the University of North Carolina at Chapel Hill, Tufts University, University of California at Berkeley, and at Brown University, where she also served as dean of the college from 2006 to 2013.

=== President of Connecticut College ===
On August 20, 2013, the Connecticut College Board of Trustees elected Bergeron as the 11th president of Connecticut College. Bergeron took office on January 1, 2014.

Bergeron has supported overhauling the Connecticut College curriculum. During her tenure, Connecticut College received the largest gift in its history to support financial aid, career education, and athletics. The College also completed a $10 million renovation of the Charles E. Shain Library that transformed the mid-century facility into a more modern space. The library has received several design awards for its architecture.

In May of 2016, student occupiers moved into Fanning Hall to demand accountability from the Connecticut College administration regarding its handling of alleged bias incidents.

==== 2023 fundraising controversy and resignation ====
Bergeron was the subject of controversy in the spring of 2023 after she scheduled a Connecticut College fundraising event at the allegedly formerly racist and antisemitic Everglades Club in Palm Beach, Florida, despite the urging of the college's Dean of Institutional Equity and Inclusion, Rodmon King, to schedule the event elsewhere. This was listed as one of the key factors that led to his resignation, alongside Bergeron's supposed history of bullying and demeaning her colleagues. On February 27, 2023, students began an occupation of Fanning Hall, Connecticut College's administrative building, in protest, which lasted ten days, during which time classes were suspended. Students also organized a march on Fanning Hall in support of Jewish and minority peers, with many students calling Bergeron racist and anti-Semitic. Faculty also took a vote of no confidence over her presidency. On March 24, 2023, after negotiation with faculty, the board of trustees, and ad-hoc student groups, Bergeron announced that she would resign at the end of the Spring 2023 semester, one year before her contract was to expire. On June 30, 2023, her last day in office, the board of trustees awarded her the title of President Emerita.

== Personal life ==
Bergeron is married to Joseph Butch Rovan, a composer and multimedia artist who is professor of music at Brown University and former director of the Brown Arts Institute.

== Published works ==
A selection of Bergeron's publications include:

- Bergeron, K. (1992). Disciplining Music: Musicology and Its Canons, ed., Katherine Bergeron and Philip Bohlman. Chicago: University of Chicago Press
- Bergeron, K. (1998). Decadent Enchantments: The Revival of Gregorian Chant at Solesmes. Berkeley: University of California Press
- Bergeron, K. (2004). Music, Rhythm, Language. Special Issue of Representations, ed. Katherine Bergeron vol. 86 (Spring)
- Bergeron, K. (2010). Voice Lessons: French Mélodie in the Belle Epoque. New York: Oxford University Press
- Bergeron, K. (2011). The Free Elective Curriculum. Piotr Wilczek and Mark O’Connor, eds., Collegium/ College/ Kolegium: College and the Academic Community in the European and the American Tradition. Uniwersytet Warszawski.
- Bergeron, K. (2012) A Tradition of Reform: The Curriculum at Brown University. Paul Blackmore and Camille Kandiko, eds., Strategic Curriculum Change in Universities: Global Trends. London: Routledge
- Bergeron, K. (2014). Listening to Write. Christiane Donahue, ed. The Power of Writing. Hanover, New Hampshire: University Press of New England
