= Hervé Descottes =

Hervé Descottes is a French lighting designer, business owner and author. He established the lighting design firm L'Observatoire International in New York City in 1993 after eight years of design practice in Paris, France. Descottes personally creates the lighting concepts for all projects designed by L'Observatoire International, and oversees project development through project completion. He is the author of Ultimate Lighting Design (teNeues, 2005) and co-authored Architectural Lighting, Designing with Light and Space (Princeton Architectural Press, 2011) with Cecilia E. Ramos. Mr. Descottes has been recognized numerous times by the lighting design and architectural community. He has received awards from the International Association of Lighting Designers, the Illuminating Engineering Society and the New York City Illuminating Engineering Society, the American Institute of Architects, the American Society of Landscape Architects, D&ADAD, the Municipal Art Society of New York City, and the GE Corporation. In 2008, Descottes was named Chevalier of the Order of Arts and Letters by the French Minister of Culture for his work in lighting design.

In 2026, Hervé Descottes received the Architecture Prize from the American Academy of Arts and Letters, recognizing architects whose work is distinguished by a strong personal direction.

A comprehensive list of projects and awards is at the L'Observatoire International article.

== Selected projects ==
- Guggenheim Abu Dhabi, Gehry Partners, LLP, Abu Dhabi (2026)
- Fondation Cartier pour l'Art Contemporain, Paris, France (2025)
- National Gallery's Sainsbury Wing, London, UK (2025)
- The Frick Collection, New York NY, USA (2025)
- Bloomberg Student Center, at The Johns Hopkins University, Baltimore MD, USA (2025)
- Azabudai Hills, Tokyo, Japan (2024)
- Transamerica Pyramid, Foster and Partners, San Francisco, CA, USA (2024)
- Lindemann Performing Arts Center at Brown University, REX (architecture firm), Providence, RI, USA (2023)
- The Schwarzman Center at Yale University, Robert A.M. Stern Architects, LLP, New Haven, CT, USA (2022)
- LUMA Arles, Gehry Partners, LLP, Arles, France (2021)
- Audrey Irmas Pavilion, Office for Metropolitan Architecture, Los Angeles, CA, USA (2021)
- Winter Visual Arts Center of Franklin & Marshall College, Steven Holl Architects, Lancaster, PA, USA (2020)
- Dwight D. Eisenhower Memorial, Gehry Partners, LLP, Washington, DC (2020)
- The Nancy and Rich Kinder Building of the Museum of Fine Arts, Houston, Steven Holl Architects, Houston, TX, USA (2020)
- National Museum of Qatar, Qatar: designed by Ateliers Jean Nouvel
- Hudson Yards Masterplan, Towers 10, 15, 30, 35, 50, The Vessel: designed by KPF, DS+R, Heatherwick Studio
- Musée du Louvre Pyramid Renovation: designed by Agence Search
- LVMH Global Concepts (Louis Vuitton, Fendi, Dior, Dior Parfums): for LVMH
- LVMH brand stores, worldwide various architects plus for LVMH
- Facebook Menlo Park: designed by: Gehry Partners
- Metropolitan Museum of Art façade and plaza, NYC: designed by Olin Partnership
- Aspen Art Museum, Aspen, CO: designed by Shigeru Ban Architects
- Kennedy Center for the Performing Arts expansion, Washington, D.C.: designed by Steven Holl Architects
- Fondation Louis Vuitton, Paris: designed by Gehry Partners
- Guggenheim Abu Dhabi: designed by Gehry Partners
- Chanel, Los Angeles, London: designed by Peter Marino Architect
- Van Cleef & Arpels Flagships, Paris, HK, NY Cdesigned by Agence Jouin Manku
- Van Cleef & Arpels Exhibition, Tokyo, NYC, Paris, Shanghai: designed by Agence Jouin Manku
- Lincoln Center Redevelopment, NYC: designed by Diller, Scofidio + Renfro, FX Fowle
- Museum of the Moving Image, NYC: designed by Leeser Architecture
- Cité du Surf et de l’Océan, Biarrtiz: designed by Steven Holl Architects
- The Highline, NYC: designed by Field Operations, DS+R
- The Art Gallery of Ontario, Toronto: designed by Gehry Partners
- Virginia Museum of Fine Arts, Richmond, VA: designed by Rick Mather + SMBW
- Walt Disney Concert Hall, Los Angeles: designed by Gehry Partners
- Columbus Circle Redevelopment, NYC: designed by Olin Partnership
- Leeum Samsung Museum of Art, Seoul: designed by Ateliers Jean Nouvel, OMA, Mario Botta

== Lectures ==
- Temporary transformation and activation of TALEA Green Cells workshop at the University of Bologna, Italy, 2026
- Light for Spaces Round Table at The Euroluce International Lighting Forum at Salone del Mobile in Milan, Italy, 2025
- Friends of ESDA of the Metropolitan Museum of Art, New York, USA, 2019
- Hervé Descottes in Conversation with Cindy Allen, Interior Design Innovation, New York, USA, 2019
- Belysnings, Stockholm, Sweden, 2018
- Designing with Light, Chicago Architecture Biennal Symposium, Chicago, USA, 2017
- Columbia CORE I Series, New York, USA, 2016
- Foro Lighting en Site IES, Mexico, 2015
- University Penn Design, Philadelphia, PA, USA, 2015
- Using Light as Infrastructure, Chester City UK, 2014
- Ubuntu: Design Symposium, Sangmyung University, Seoul, Korea, 2011
- OHNY, Friends of the High Line, New York, USA, 2010
- Light and Theater, New York, NY, USA, 2008
- Art, Architecture and Light, Athens, Greece, 2008
- Making Light, IES Mexico, Mexico City, Mexico, 2008
- Evocative Luminance, IES NY, New York, USA, 2007
- Rediscovering Columbus, New York, USA, 2007
- UW School of Architecture, University of Waterloo, Canada, 2006
- Cooper Union School of Architecture, New York, USA, 2006
- Lighting Design Talk, Cedar Lake Theater, New York, USA, 2006
- Center of Mediterranean Architecture, Chania Crete, Greece, 2004
- Hommage to James Turrell, Institute Franco-Portugais, Lisbon, 2003

== Bibliography ==
- Ultimate Lighting Design (teNeues, 2005)
- Architectural Lighting, Designing with Light and Space co-authored with Cecilia E. Ramos (Princeton Architectural Press, 2011)
