= Ivy Film Festival =

American student-run film festival

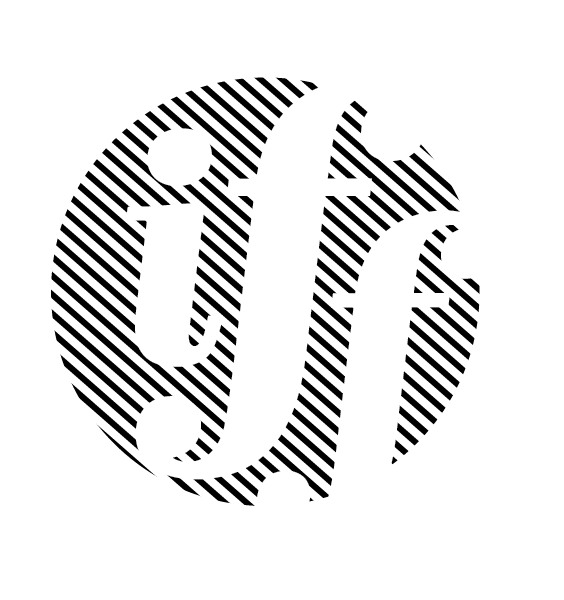
- Location: Brown University, Providence, Rhode Island
- Founded: 2001; 25 years ago
- Founded by: David Peck and Justin Slosky
- Website: ivyfilmfestival.org

Ivy Film Festival (IFF) is the world's largest student-run film festival, hosted annually on the campus of Brown University. The Festival was started in 2001 by then-Brown juniors David Peck and Justin Slosky in collaboration with students of the other seven Ivy League schools including vice chairman Doug Imbruce from Columbia University. The founders' goal was to create a venue to showcase and honor the work of talented student filmmakers. The Ivy Film Festival currently accepts submissions from around the world for both its short film and screenplay competitions.

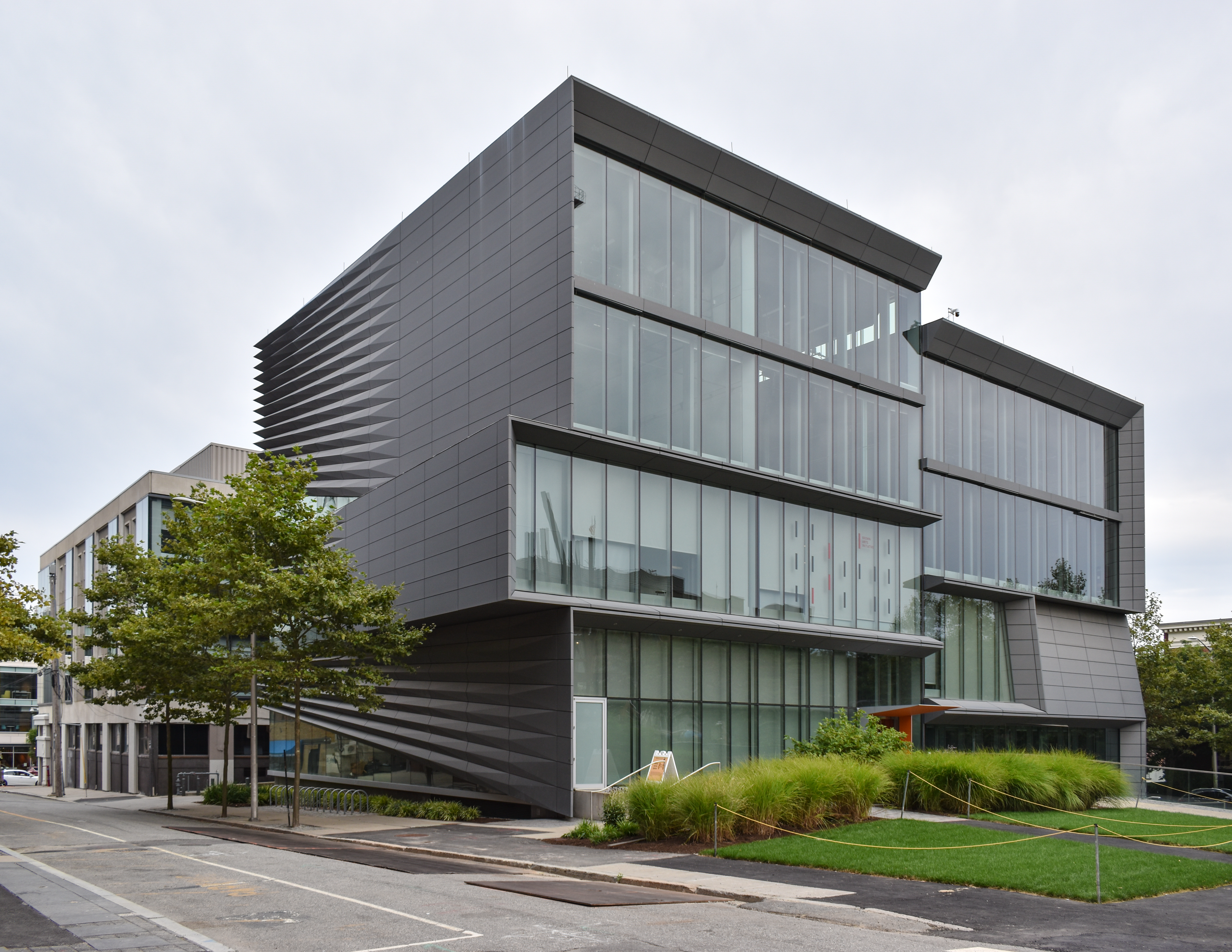
IFF events are primarily hosted in Brown's Granoff Center

In addition to student film screenings, the Festival hosts advanced screenings of commercial and independent features as well as discussion panels, academic workshops, and keynote addresses with industry guests, who attend the Festival to engage in wide-ranging discussions about film and the entertainment industry. Subjects addressed at festival events have included the relationship between film and social justice, how one can achieve success in the entertainment industry, and the merits of attending film school. Past attendees of Ivy Film Festival include well-known film directors, screenwriters, and actors, such as Jack Nicholson, Martin Scorsese, Oliver Stone, Tim Robbins, Lena Dunham, Adrien Brody, Aaron Sorkin, James Franco, Wes Craven, Philip Glass, Mira Nair, Chan-wook Park, Doug Liman, John Cho, Kal Penn, Davis Guggenheim, Dylan Kidd, James Toback, John Hamburg, Julia Stiles, Laura Linney, and Michael Showalter. Preview screenings hosted by the Festival have included Neighbors, Locke, The Way, Way Back, The East, (500) Days of Summer, Star Trek (2009), Mean Girls, The Believer, Brick, Shine a Light, The Aristocrats, and the Academy Award-winning and -nominated No Country for Old Men, Super Size Me, Half Nelson, Murderball, Water, and Iraq in Fragments.

== History ==
=== 2000s ===
The inaugural Ivy Film Festival was held in December 2001. A product of collaboration between the organizers, Brown's Modern Culture and Media Department, the Brown Film Society and students at other Ivy League universities, the festival weekend screened 46 student films, selected from over 150 entries, and welcomed over 300 attendees. Events hosted by the Festival included talks from Oliver Stone and Henry Bean as well as the U.S. premiere of James Toback's Harvard Man, starring Adrien Grenier.

The second festival, held in April 2003 due to its growth, attracted even more attention. The additions of an international student film competition and a screenplay competition broadened interest. Guests such as Tim Robbins and Julia Stiles spoke and accepted awards; director Dylan Kidd shared his film Roger Dodger, and panelists from across the country shared their advice and experiences with students.

The 2004 Ivy Film Festival featured unprecedented expansion, with 1,500 people in attendance and over 200 student films submitted. The Festival hosted and presented awards to director Wes Craven and Academy Award-winning actor Adrien Brody, as well as holding a business panel featuring Paramount Studio Vice Chairman Rob Friedman. The Festival held exclusive advance screenings of Mean Girls and Supersize Me, celebrated films at the time that are now considered favorite cult classics.

In 2005, the Ivy Film Festival screened the movies The Aristocrats and Murderball and featured John Hamburg, writer of the screenplays of Zoolander and Meet the Parents, as a keynote speaker. Ellen Kuras, cinematographer for Eternal Sunshine of the Spotless Mind also led a workshop, while Luke Greenfield led a talk focused on working in Hollywood.

The 5th annual Ivy Film Festival, held in 2006, featured screenings of Black Gold, Occupation: Dreamland, Kinky Boots, Take the Lead, and The Children of Chabannes, as well as Sundance favorites Iraq in Fragments, Half Nelson, and Brick. Students from Columbia University, New York University, Cornell University, and Brown University walked away with awards in the Undergraduate categories, which were jured by Brown alumnus Michael Showalter, the acclaimed actor and co-writer of Wet Hot American Summer; Marc Francis, the director of Black Gold; Mark Ross, a producer at Maguire Entertainment; David Courier, a senior programmer for Outfest, the Sundance Film Festival and the Berlin Film Festival; and Lisa Gossels, the director of Children of Chabannes.

The 2007 festival included pre-release screenings of Sundance Film Festival selections, panels, and workshops with award-winning filmmakers, and presentations by Doug Liman, director of The Bourne Identity and Chan-wook Park, director of Oldboy. Other guests included actor John Cho and Academy Award-winning writer and director Sarah Kernochan.

The 2008 Film Festival was the first student film festival to have a machinima genre. The 2008 festival featured a keynote address by Fox Filmed Entertainment Co-chairman and CEO, Tom Rothman, and a master class led by Martin Scorsese.

The 2009 Film Festival occurred on April 21–26 and featured a keynote panel with actor Jack Nicholson, Chinatown producer Robert Evans, and Paramount Chairman and CEO Brad Grey, moderated by former Variety Editor-in-Chief Peter Bart.

=== 2010s ===
The 2010 Ivy Film Festival featured an advance screening of Waiting for Superman, followed by a Q&A with director Davis Guggenheim. The festival also featured two film industry panels. The first, titled “From the Ground Up,” featured producer Andrew Renzi and writer and actor Christopher Thornton. The second, titled “Where Creativity and Commerce Merge,” featured production and development VP Abby Ex, development VP Bryan Unkeless, executive VP Milan Popelka, and production VP Adam Rosenberg.

The 2011 Ivy Film Festival occurred Tuesday, April 19 to Sunday, April 24. The festival featured undergraduate and graduate films along with professional films previously screened at the Sundance Film Festival. Most of the screenings included question and answer panels with directors, producers, writers, and actors alike. Guests included journalist Charlie Rose, director Max Winkler and actor Michael Angarano, among others. IFF also hosted a keynote panel featuring acclaimed actor James Franco and the screenwriter of The Social Network and The West Wing, Aaron Sorkin.

The 2012 Ivy Film Festival featured a selection of industry talks, including Laura Linney ‘86 and Kal Penn. Barry Levinson, the Oscar-winning director of Rain Man, accompanied his newest film The Bay, his first foray into the genre of horror. IFF also premiered the first two episodes of HBO's hit series Girls before they were televised and hosted a Q&A with creator, director, and star Lena Dunham. Additional events included advanced screenings such as Zal Batmanglij's directorial debut, The Sound of My Voice; the celebrated documentary The Invisible War; and the documentary The Atomic States of America, which was followed by a talk with producer George Hornig. These events complemented diverse Official Selection blocks, featuring submissions from over fifteen countries, including Zambia, Nicaragua, Poland, and Nepal.

The 2013 Ivy Film Festival included pre-release screenings of The Way, Way Back, The Kings of Summer, The East, and The Reluctant Fundamentalist, which was followed by a Q&A with director Mira Nair. Brown alumni and Warm Bodies director Jonathan Levine ‘00 spoke about his film at a preview screening in January. Other guests included producers Christine Vachon ‘83, Brad Simpson ‘95, and Mark Heyman ‘02. The Festival also hosted screenings of Searching for Sugar Man and After Tiller as part of its Stories for Change Series. The Festival concluded with a packed screening of the horror classic Scream, which was accompanied by a keynote address from horror movie maestro Wes Craven.

The 2014 Ivy Film Festival featured screenings of diverse films including Darren Aronofsky's Noah, Steven Knight's Locke, Leah Meyerhoff's I Believe in Unicorns, Zachary Heinzerling's Cutie and the Boxer, and Nicholas Stoller's Neighbors. Keynote speaker Wes Anderson addressed audiences in two sold-out theatre rooms via Skype following a screening of his critically acclaimed film, The Grand Budapest Hotel. The 2014 Festival had a number of individual speakers including Casey Neistat and David Frankel as well as a “Women in Entertainment” panel Nancy Josephson, Karen O’Hara, Samantha Stiglitz, and Lauren Zalaznick.

In 2015, Ivy Film Festival featured advanced screenings of Slow West and Trainwreck as well as screenings and The Sisterhood of Night and Dosa Hunt, which were both followed by panel discussions. The 2015 Festival introduced the Screenplay Reading series, where selected submissions to the Screenplay Competition were read live by a panel of actors. Attendees were invited to participate in workshops with Matthew Frost and Michael Schultz, and to see a panel focusing on animation in film with Brenda Chapman, Ron Ryder, and Barbara Meier. The Festival also hosted keynote addresses from Todd Haynes ‘85 and Jason Schwartzman.

The 2016 Ivy Film Festival took place from April 6 through April 12, featuring keynote speakers Jodie Foster and Robert De Niro and pre-release screenings of the films Krisha and Popstar: Never Stop Never Stopping. Panels featuring special industry guests included "The Audience in Revolt: 'Gender, Race, and Representation in Hollywood'" and "New Modes of Storytelling." 2016 was the first year that the official selection was exhibited at each Ivy League university. Robert De Niro's appearance was part of a moderated discussion led by Brown University's current president, Christina Paxson, and preceded by a screening of the HBO documentary Remembering the Artist, Robert De Niro, Sr.

The 2017 festival featured three speakers M. Night Shyamalan, Barry Levinson and Ezra Edelman as well as 25 films.

The 17th Ivy Film Festival, hosted in 2018, featured guests Shia LaBeouf and screenings of Mid90s and Eighth Grade.

In 2019, the festival hosted André Leon Talley, Logan Lerman, Olivia Wilde, and Beanie Feldstein and screened films including Booksmart, The Farewell, and Mickey and the Bear

=== 2020s ===
The 19th Ivy Film Festival was held virtually due to the COVID-19 pandemic.
