= Perry and Marty Granoff Center for the Creative Arts =

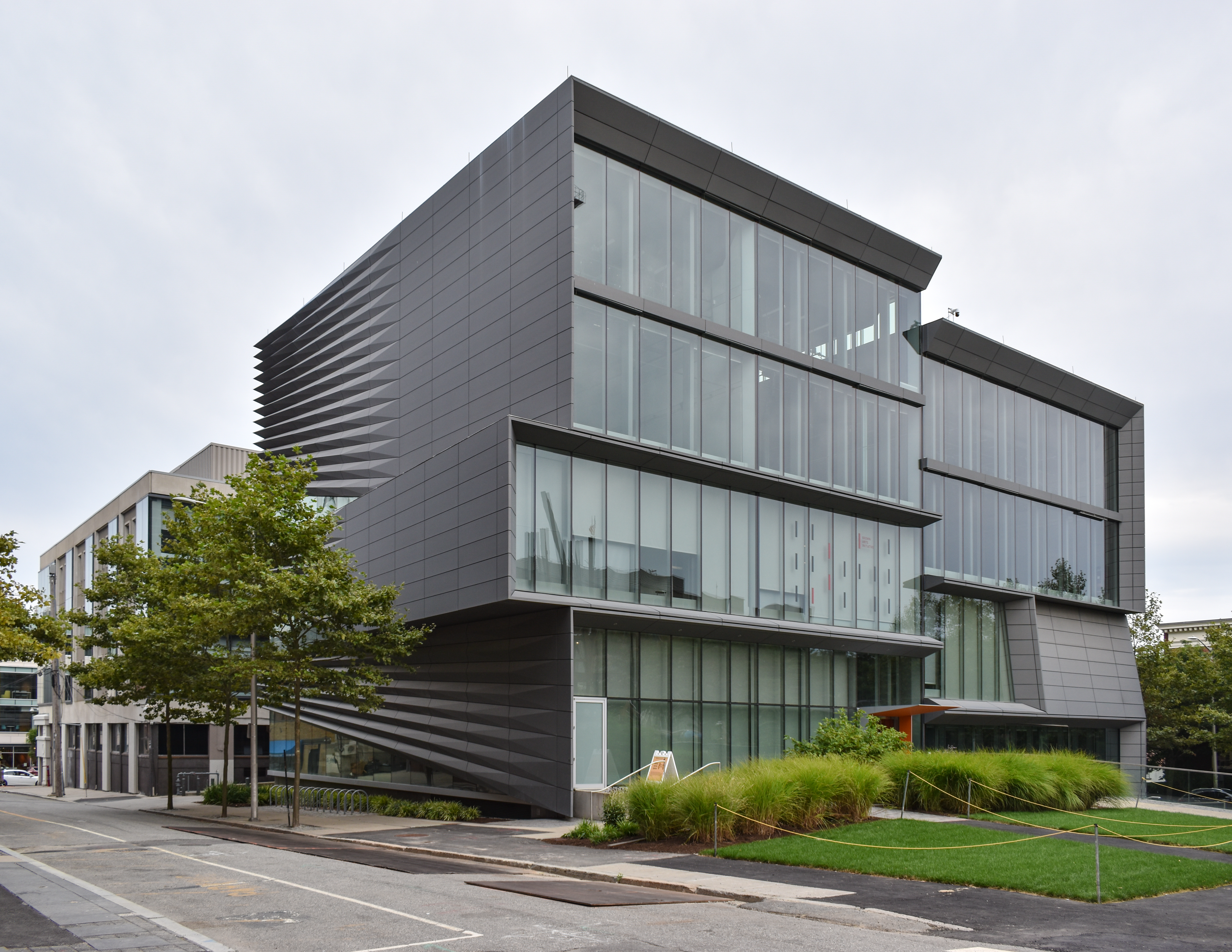
- Interactive map of Perry and Marty Granoff Center for the Creative Arts
- Location: Providence, RI
- Coordinates: 41.82828°N 71.40148°W
- Owner: Brown University

Construction
- Groundbreaking: May 21st, 2009
- Opened: 2011
- Cost: $38 million
- Architect: Diller Scofidio + Renfro

Website
- arts.brown.edu/granoff-center

The Perry and Marty Granoff Center for the Creative Arts (known simply as the Granoff Center colloquially) is a visual and performing arts facility at Brown University in Providence, Rhode Island. The building is home to the Brown Arts Institute.

Designed by New York–based firm Diller Scofidio + Renfro, the building includes at 218-seat auditorium, as well as various other performance and exhibition spaces. The 38,000 square foot building is notable for its split facade: its right side is sunken half a floor below its left side, creating a disjointed effect.

The building's construction cost was $38 million. The building is named for Perry and Martin Granoff, the primary benefactors of its construction.

== Reception ==
In a 2011 article published after the center's opening, New York Times architecture critic Nicolai Ouroussoff described the building as a "handsome piece of architecture" that "creates wonderful visual relationship."

== Performing Arts Center ==
In February 2018, the University announced plans to construct the Lindemann Performing Arts Center adjacent to the Granoff Center. According to the Brown Daily Herald, the new Performing Arts Center is intended to serve as a performance–focused counterpart to Granoff, which functions as a “laboratory space.”

== Gallery ==
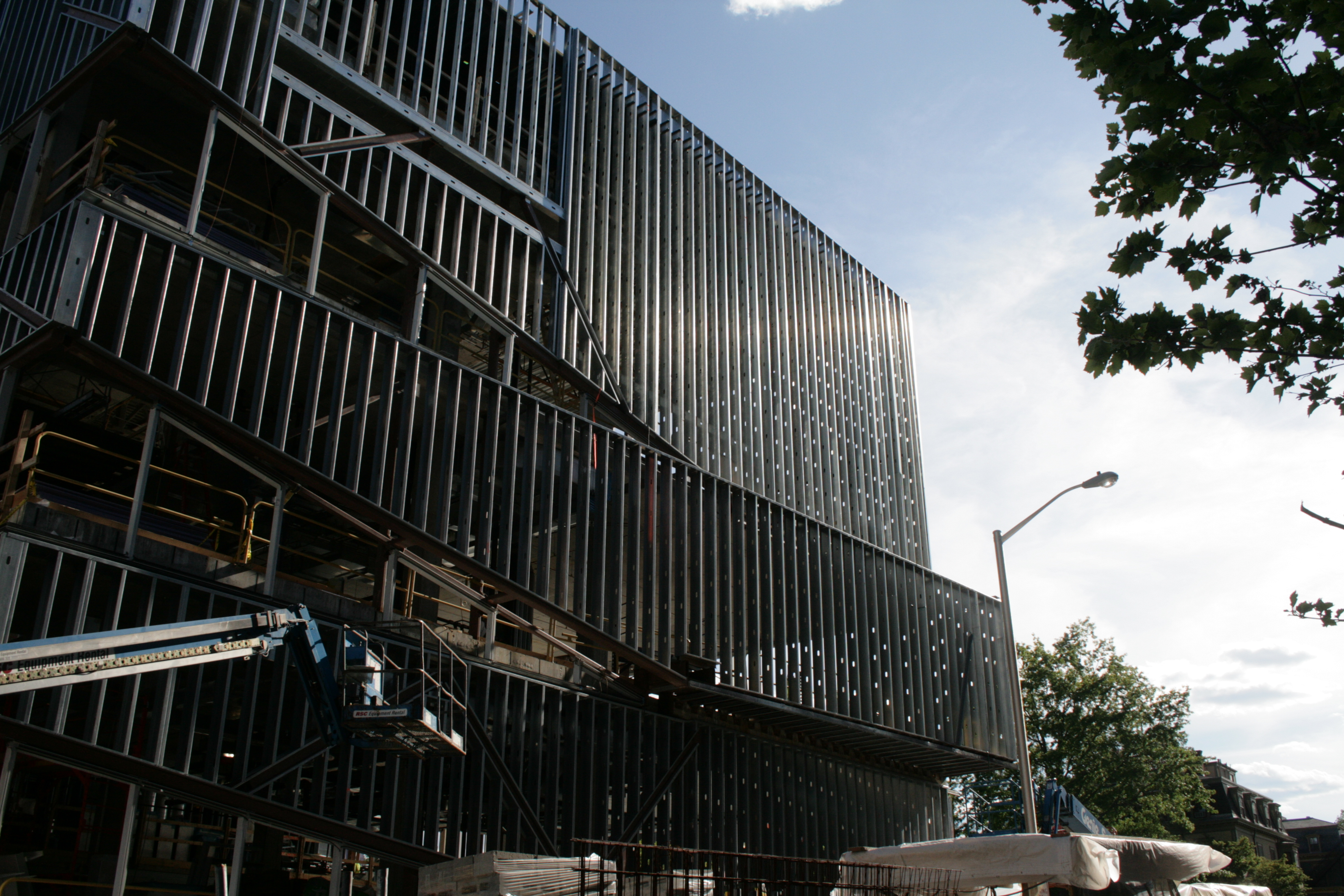
Construction of the building, May 2010

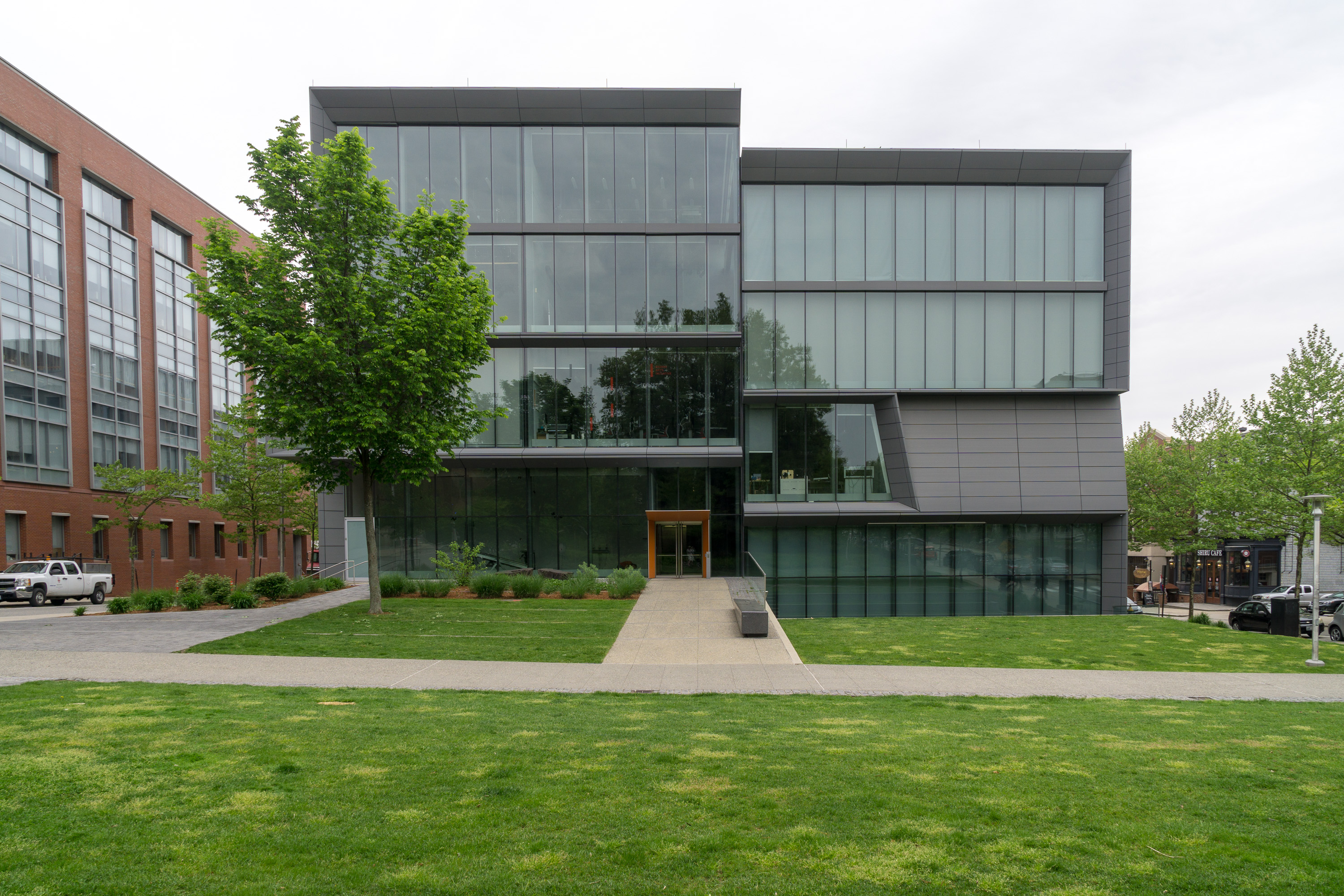

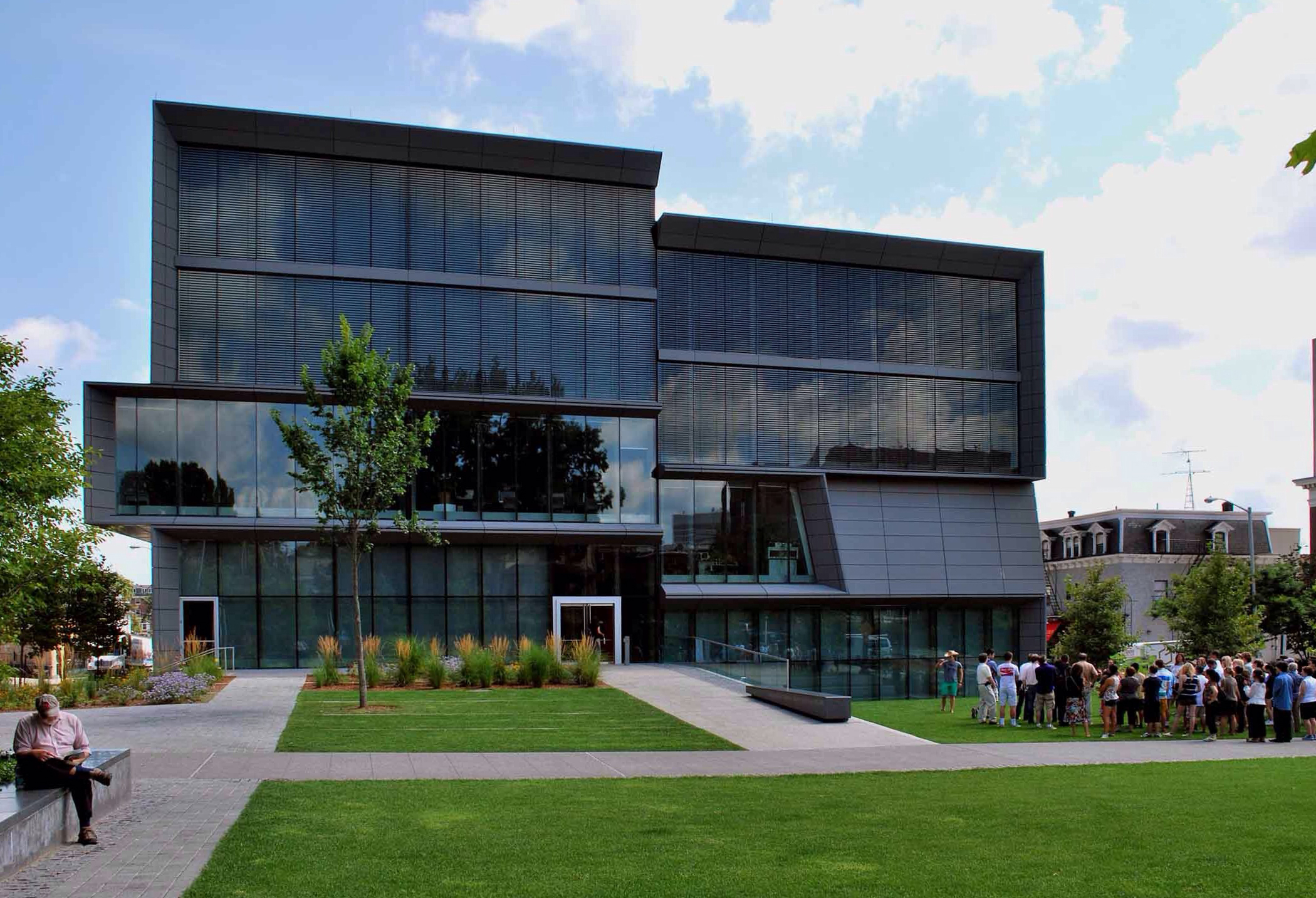

== See also ==
- List of Brown University buildings
- Ivy Film Festival
