= Thalia Field =

American author

Thalia Field (born 1966) is an American author known for innovative fiction and interdisciplinary literature. She teaches experimental fiction and interdisciplinary performance at Brown University, where she also serves as Faculty Director of the Brown Arts Institute.

Field has published four books with New Directions Publishing, most recently Personhood, which is the companion volume to Bird Lovers, Backyard from 2010. Both books inquire into human-animal dilemmas and tragic human-animal narratives that surround us.

Her recent novel, Experimental Animals (A Reality Fiction)], published by Solid Objects (NY) is a collage-based and genre-blending novel that explores the origins of both experimental literature and modern experimental bio-medicine. Based on the marriage of Claude and Fanny Bernard, the novel also features women activists who have been overlooked in science history and focuses particularly on the living animal body in pain (vivisection) as foundational to the history of physiology.

In collaboration with French writer/translator Abigail Lang, she has published a lyric essay, A Prank of Georges, with Essay Press, and an experimental essay collaboration, Leave to Remain (Legends of Janus), with Dalkey Archive in 2020.

A "performance novel", ULULU (Clown Shrapnel), was published by Coffee House Press 2007.
