= Newtown Creek Wastewater Treatment Plant =

Sewage treatment facility in New York City

Coordinates: 40°44′03″N 73°56′47″W

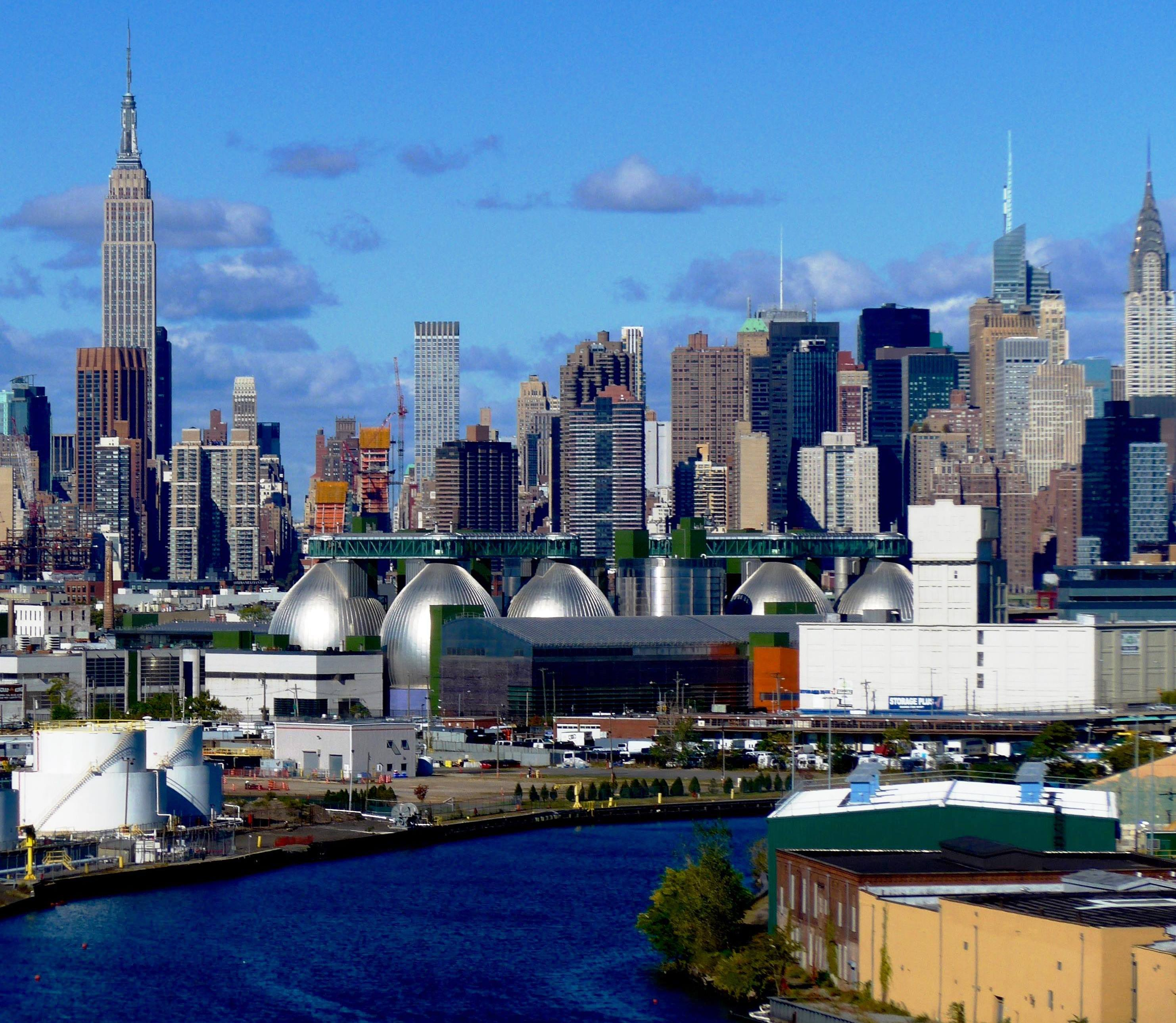
The plant as seen from the Kosciuszko Bridge

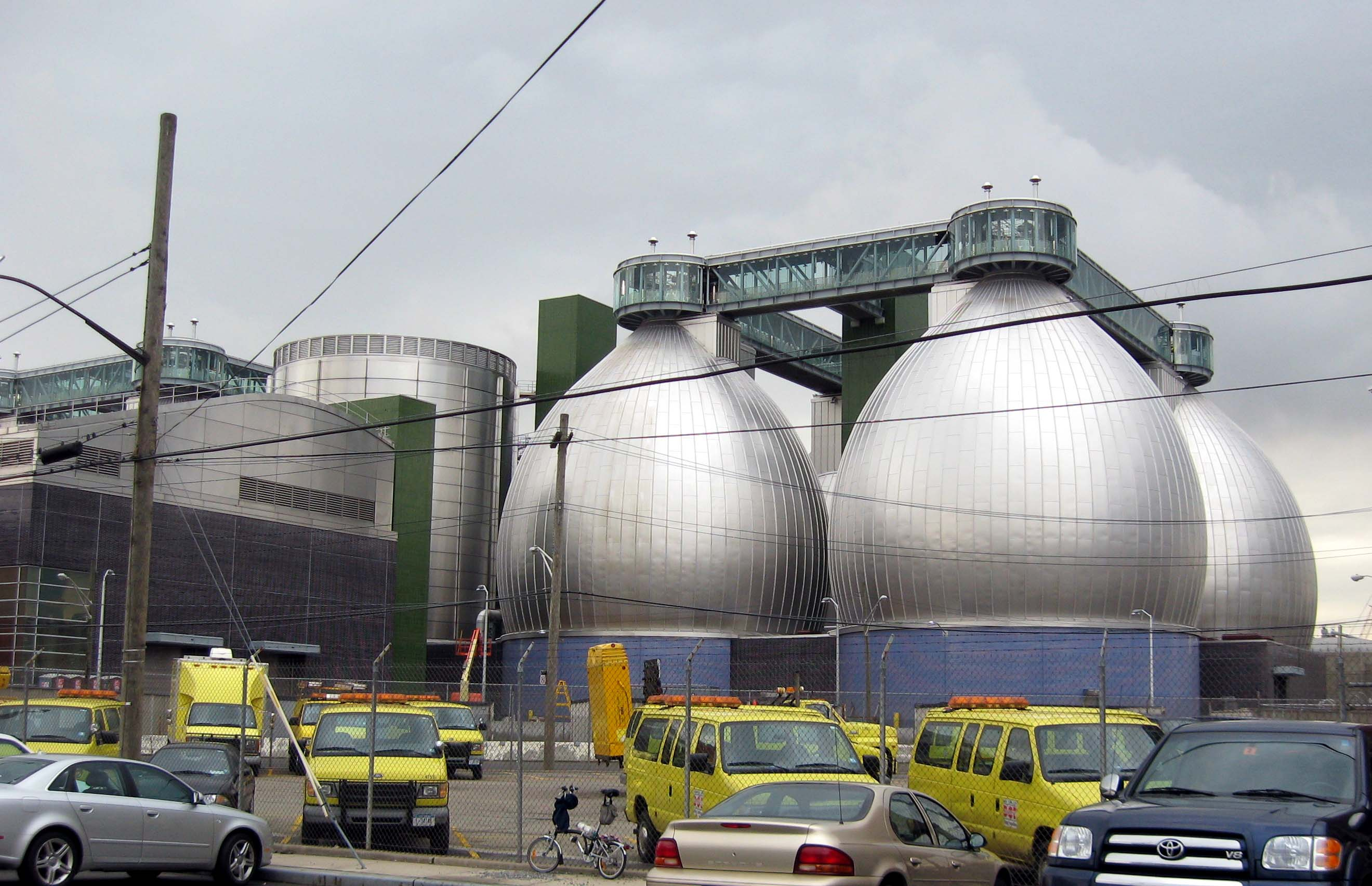
Three "digester eggs" at Newtown Creek Wastewater Treatment Plant

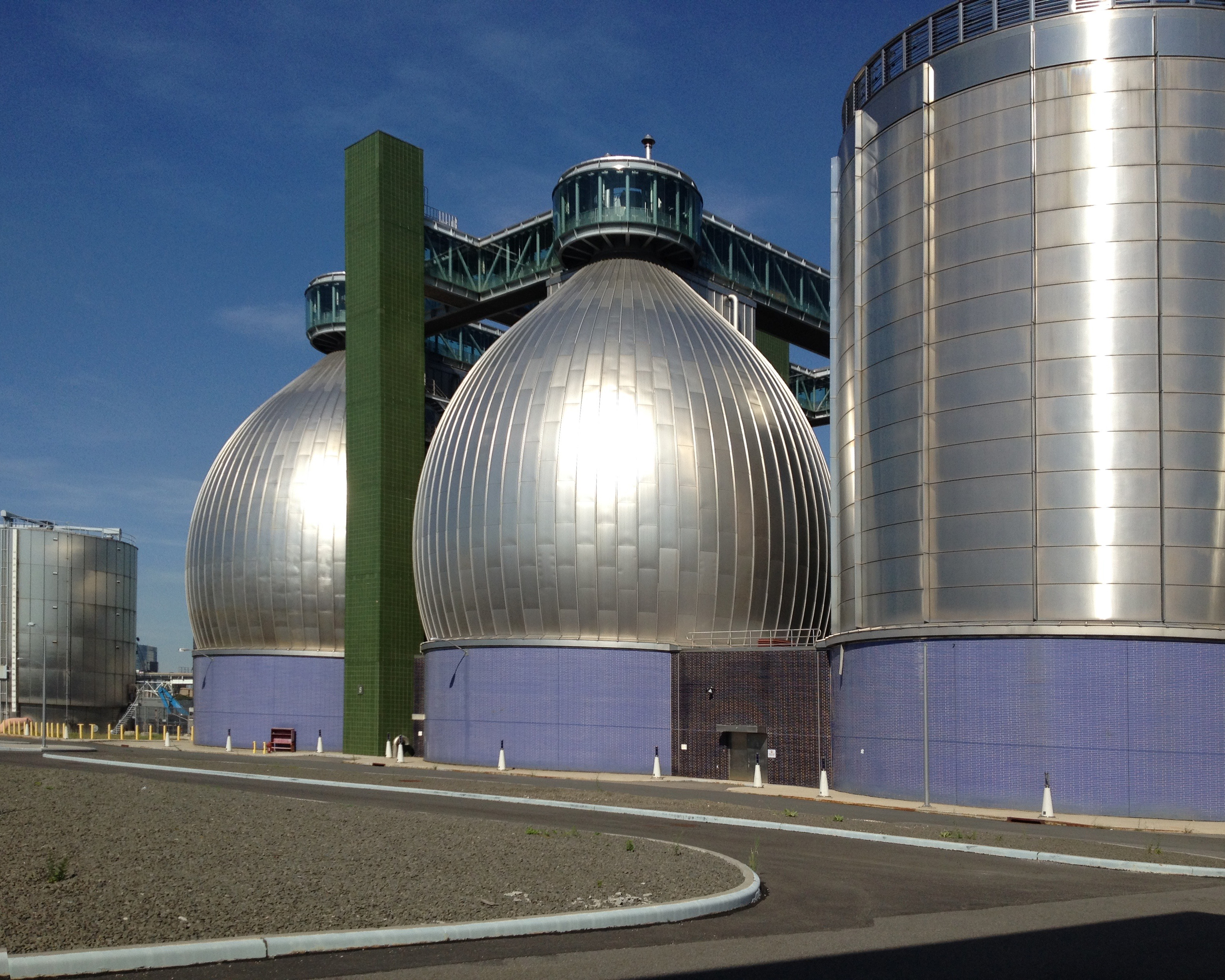
Newtown Creek Wastewater Treatment Plant digester eggs Greenpoint, Brooklyn, New York

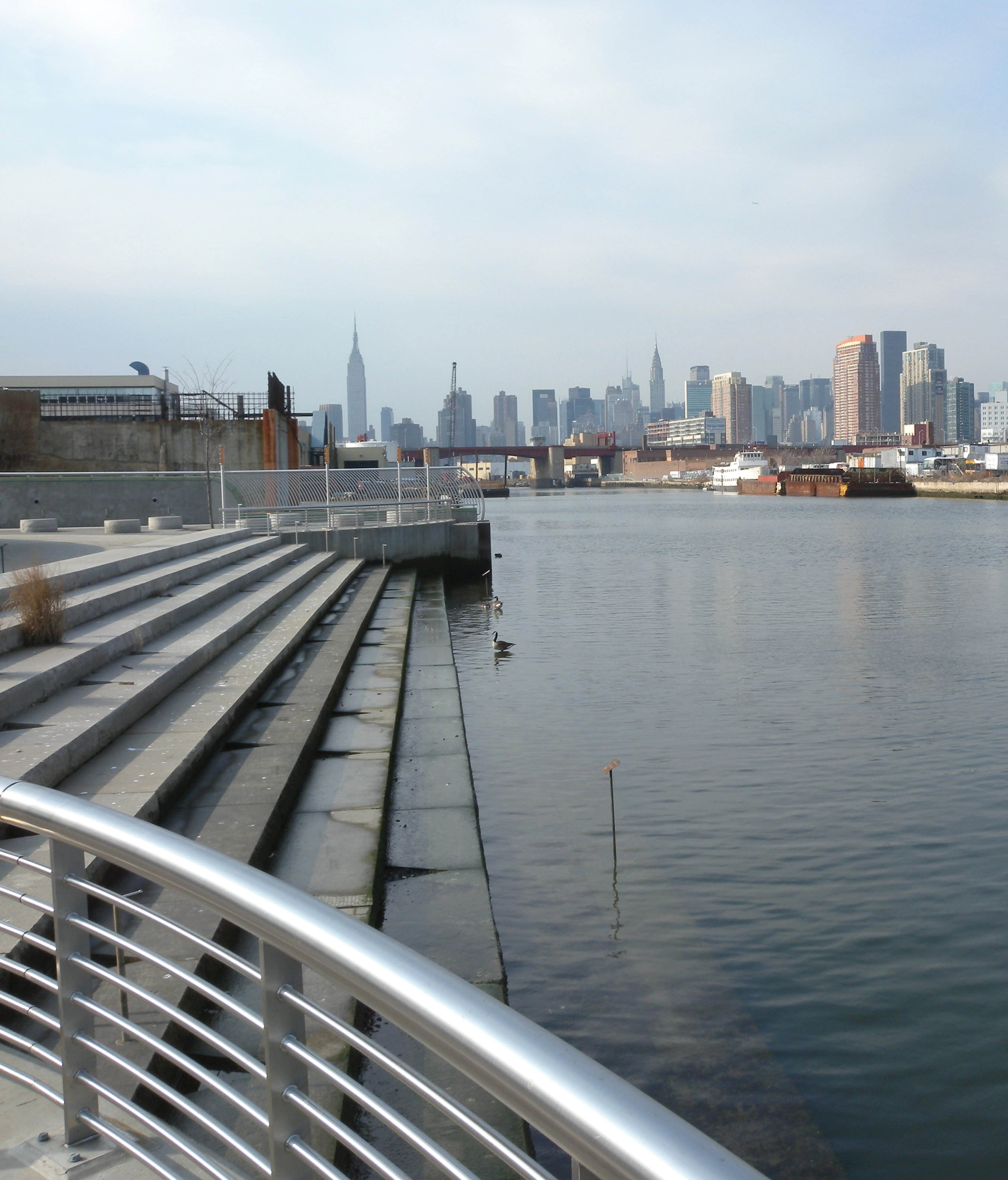
A portion of the nature walk on Newtown Creek. Each step represents a different evolutionary era.

The Newtown Creek Wastewater Treatment Plant is the largest sewage treatment facility operated by the New York City Department of Environmental Protection. Since 2010, its eight metallic "digester eggs", which are 140 feet (43 meters) tall and dramatically illuminated with blue light at night, have made it a local landmark, particularly to motorists on several nearby roadways in the New York City boroughs of Brooklyn, Queens, and Manhattan. It is located on the Newtown Creek in Brooklyn's Greenpoint neighborhood along Greenpoint Avenue.

Since April 2023, after years of delays, the plant regularly produces renewable natural gas that is returned to the natural gas grid, 60% of the gas is used to power the plant itself, and the remainder flows to households and businesses throughout New York City.

== History ==
The plant was originally constructed in 1967. The plant's unusual public amenities, which include a visitors' center with a manmade waterfall, a nature walk along the Newtown Creek, and the dramatic aesthetic elements, all stem from a long-term upgrade project that was begun by the city in 1998 and was scheduled for completion in 2014. The aim of this work is to increase plant capacity by 50 percent and to comply with the U.S. Clean Water Act. When some Greenpoint residents resisted the expansion of the plant, the city responded by appointing a group of local residents to represent the community's interests during design and construction. The participation of this group, as well as a city law that requires 1 percent of expenditures on public works go to public art, led to the inclusion of the public amenities in the project plan. The nature walk opened in 2007, and the other elements were all in place by 2010. The plant has remained in full operation during the renovation project.

The city chose Polshek Partnership, now known as Ennead Architects LLP, as the lead architect and master planner for the renovation project. Polshek worked with three environmental engineering firms, Greeley and Hansen, Hazen and Sawyer, and Malcolm Pirnie. Vito Acconci was engaged to create the waterfall and watercourse in and around the visitors' center. Hervé Descottes was chosen to design the lighting, which includes the blue lighting of the digester eggs as well as white lighting of walkways. George Trakas designed the nature walk, which includes several sculptural elements. The plant's design has won awards from the AIA, the Society of American Registered Architects, and from the Art Commission of the City of New York (now known as the NYC Design Commission).

The egg-shaped structures house the plant's sludge digesters. The digesters use a process called anaerobic digestion to transform the sewage plant sludge byproduct into a form which can be used as fertilizer. The plant gives monthly public tours of the digester eggs, for which reservations are required. The Visitor Center, which is located on Greenpoint Avenue at Humboldt Street, is open by appointment only. The Newtown Creek Nature Walk is outside the perimeter fence of the plant and is thus open daily during daylight hours. It can be accessed from the foot of Paidge Avenue, east of its intersection with Provost Street.

== Function ==
The plant serves an area with a population of just over 1 million people in Lower Manhattan and nearby parts of Brooklyn and Queens. Its site covers 54 acres and is bounded by Greenpoint Avenue on the south, Provost Avenue on the west, Kingsland Avenue on the east, and Paidge Avenue and Newtown Creek on the north. An inlet called Whale Creek bisects the northwestern portion of the site. The Newtown Creek Nature Walk provides public access to the left bank of Whale Creek.

The plant handles a large portion of the drainage from the East Side of Manhattan. Sewage from the Financial District, Greenwich Village, the Lower East Side, Midtown East and the East Side up to 71st Street flows through 180 miles (290 km) of sewer pipes and interceptor pipes to the Thirteenth Street Pumping Station at 13th Street and Avenue D, from where it is sent under the East River to the plant. Normal influx is 170 million US gallons (450 million L; 100 million imp gal) a day, which increases to 300 million US gallons (450 million L; 100 million imp gal) during wet weather. After a significant overflow occurred during the New York City blackout of 1977, and 828 million US gallons (3.134 billion L; 689 million imp gal) of raw sewage spilled into the East River, the federal government ordered in 1995 that the city build back-up facilities. Despite this, the Northeast blackout of 2003 produced 145 million US gallons (550 million L; 121 million imp gal) of raw sewage spilled. In 1998, the city started its program to expand the facility. Construction was completed in 2014, and the plant remained opened throughout the renovation process. The plant can now handle 310 million gallons of waste water per day, with about 250 million gallons being the daily average, representing about 18% of the city's wastewater.

Even with the expansion of the plant, as of 2014, the city is still not in full compliance with the 1972 federal Clean Water Act, which mandates that secondary treatment should remove 85% of pollutants from incoming sewage, or with New York State's 1992 order for the city to prevent overflows by 2013. Overflows from the Newtown Creek plant on the order of 100 million US gallons (380,000,000 L) occur on the average of once a week. When that occurs

When sewage loads exceed the capacity of the Newtown Creek Sewage Treatment Facility trash, pesticides, petroleum products, PCBs, mercury, cadmium, lead, pathogenic microorganisms, and nutrients which reduce the dissolved oxygen content of the water are dumped into Newtown Creek. This dumping is referred to as a combined sewer overflow or CSO. CSOs can be triggered by as little as a tenth of an inch of rain.

Essentially anything that gets washed into the gutters from the street, anything that households and businesses flush down the toilet or dump down the drain, has a fair chance of being expelled directly into Newtown Creek or New York Harbor untreated. In New York City a CSO event occurs once a week on average, discharging approximately 500 million gallons of raw sewage directly into New York Harbor. CSOs are the single largest impairment to the quality of New York City's waters.

The city requested a postponement of the 2013 deadline in consideration of its plan to build a fully compliant Newtown Creek plant by 2022.

== Sources ==
- Eldredge, Niles and Horenstein, Sidney (2014). Concrete Jungle: New York City and Our Last Best Hope for a Sustainable Future. Berkeley, California: University of California Press. ISBN 978-0-520-27015-2. OCLC 888191476.
