= Brown Arts Institute =

Institute at Brown University

Coordinates: 41.82822°N 71.40194°W

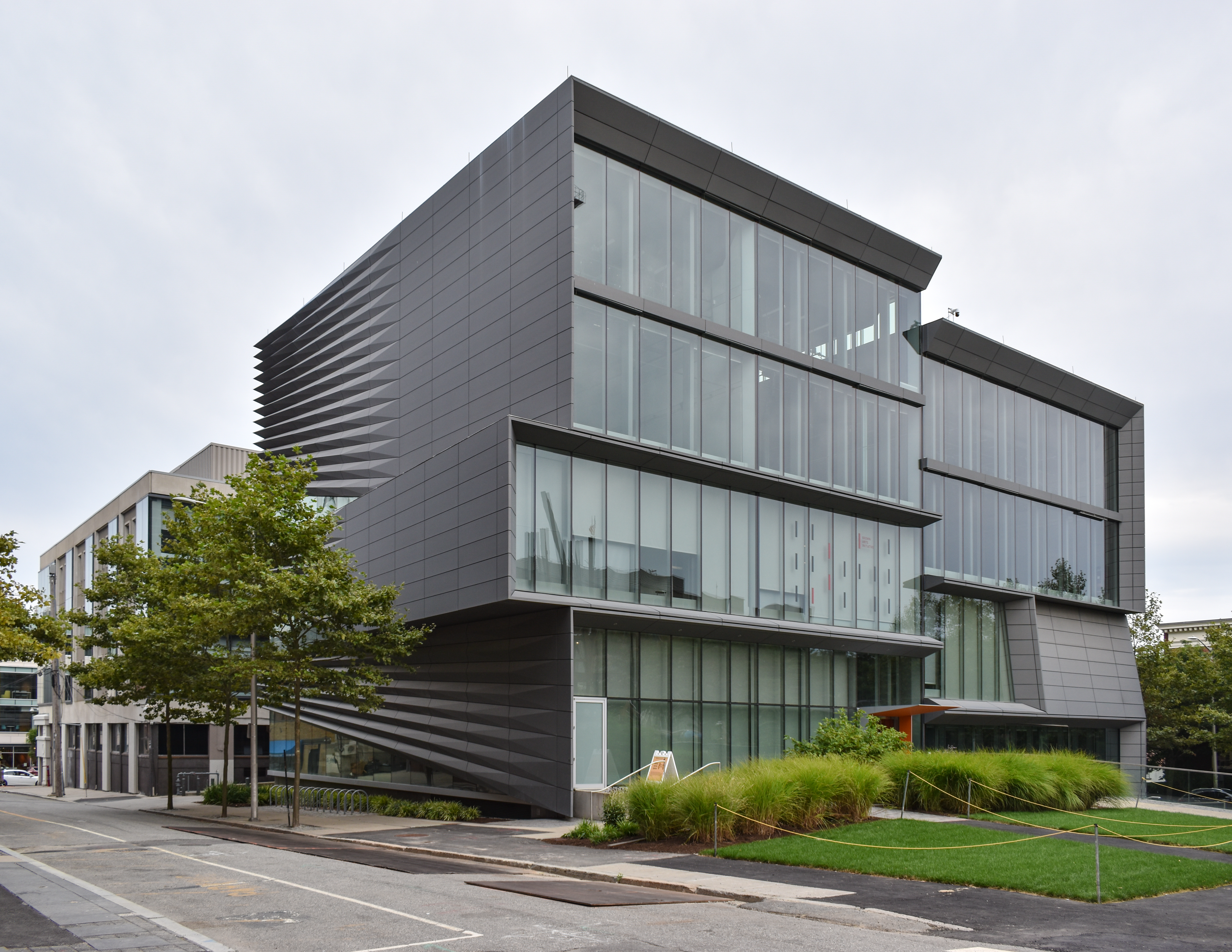
- The Granoff Center currently houses the BAI
- Established: 2016; 9 years ago
- Directors: Thalia Field; Avery Willis Hoffman
- Location: Brown University, Providence, RI
- Website: arts.brown.edu

Brown Arts Institute (BAI) is an institute at Brown University for the practice, theory and scholarship of the performing, literary, and visual arts. Founded in 2016, the BAI is home to the university's six academic arts departments, the David Winton Bell Gallery, and the Rites and Reason Theatre. The BAI structures programmatic offerings including exhibits and lecture series around three-year long rotating themes.

== History ==
The Brown Arts Initiative was founded 2016 and launched in March 2017 with Professor of Music Joseph “Butch” Rovan as its inaugural faculty director. The initiative's launch coincided with the university's announcement of a plan to construct the Lindemann Performing Arts Center. The venue, set to be completed in 2023, is located adjacent to the Perry and Marty Granoff Center for the Creative Arts.

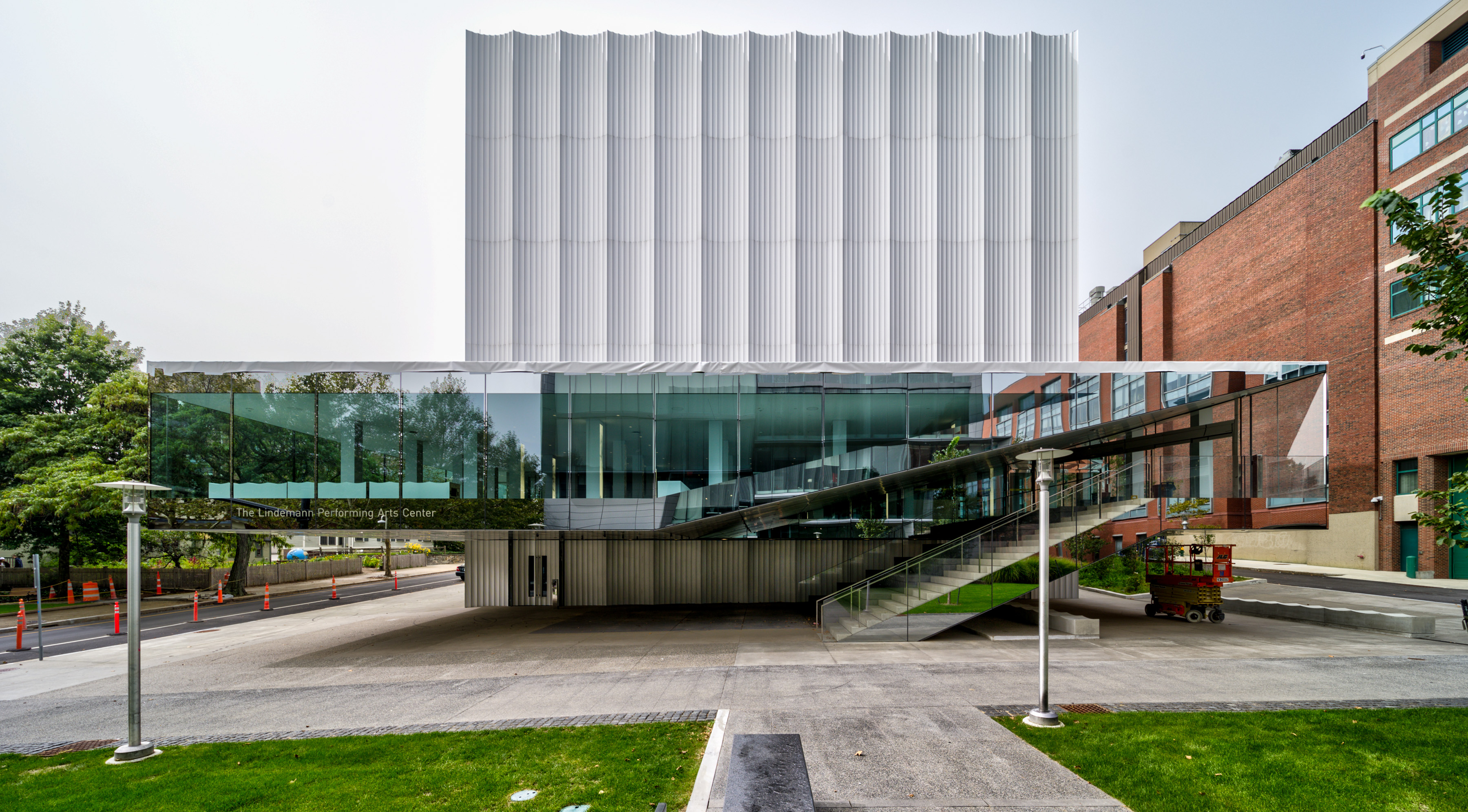
The Lindemann Performing Arts Center

In August 2017, the BAI launched the Warren and Allison Kanders Lecture Series which brings four artists, critics, and curators to campus each year to engage in dialogue about contemporary art and its impact. The inaugural installment of the lecture series featured Nick Cave, Wangechi Mutu, Shirin Neshat, and Thelma Golden.

In 2020 Thalia Field succeed Rovan as faculty director and Avery Willis Hoffman was appointed the institute's inaugural artistic director. In July 2021, the Brown Arts Initiative transitioned to the Brown Arts Institute.

== Offerings and programs ==
=== Professors of the Practice ===
Since 2016, the Brown Arts Institute has brought practicing artists to campus as Professors of the Practice. These appointments last two semesters with one dedicated to teaching and another to research. Past Professors of the Practice include Tania Bruguera, Coco Fusco, Erin McKeown, and Ralph Lemon.

=== Grants ===
The Brown Arts Institute offers a range of grant programs which offer up to $1,000 to students to facilitate the production, study, and criticism of the creative arts. In 2021, the BAI announced the David Dornstein ’85 Grant, which awards a total of $50,000 annually to at least one graduating senior and graduating graduate student.
