= Château de Malleret =

Wine estate and château in Aquitaine, France

- Location: Le Pian-Médoc, Gironde, France
- Coordinates: 44.9654°N 0.6422°W
- Wine region: Bordeaux
- First vines planted: 1827
- Key people: Paul Bordes, Aymar du Vivier
- Parent company: Grands Vin de Gironde
- Area cultivated: 86
- Cases/yr: 20,000
- Known for: Château de Malleret Haut-Médoc
- Varietals: Haut-Médoc, Bordeaux Blanc, Merlot, Cabernet Sauvignon
- Other products: Olive oil, Honey
- Website: Official website

An add for Chateau Malleret. “The wines from Ferwerda & Tieman are pure and very reasonably priced.”

Château de Malleret is a 35 ha (86 acres) wine estate and château located in the commune of Le Pian-Médoc and Ludon-Médoc in Gironde, Aquitaine, France.

== History ==
The estate dates back to the 16th century and was established by Pierre Eyquem De Montaigne (1513-1568), Mayor of Bordeaux, during the reign of King Henry II and father of Michel de Montaigne. The next recorded owner, Collineau, was in command of the artillery and ammunition of the army of Guyenne, and erected two powder magazines there. In 1593 the estate was purchased by Pierre de Malleret, who was knighted for his distinguished service as equerry to King Louis XIV.

Between 1730 and 1830, Malleret passed through the hands of several great Bordeaux families. During this period Vincent Février bought Château de Malleret, enlarged it by purchasing a number of the surrounding landholdings and converted it into a wine estate. His son-in-law, Jean-Baptiste de Basterot, replaced the original buildings with a manor house, of which two pavilions remain today. In 1830, Philippe-Frédéric Clossmann, leased the estate and subsequently purchased it in 1860.

The landscaped gardens and arboretum are the work of landscape architect, Armand Joseph Ivoy, in the 1870s, who was inspired by Denis and Eugène Bühler (who designed the Parc du Thabor).

The estate has been continuously owned by the descendants of the Clossman family.
