= Cité de l'Océan et du Surf =

Coordinates: 43.4622°N 1.5723°W

- Interactive map of the Cité de l'Océan et du Surf area

General information
- Location: Biarritz, France
- Construction started: 2005
- Completed: 2011
- Opening: June 2011

Technical details
- Floor area: 38000 sqm

Design and construction
- Architect: Steven Holl Architects with Solange Fabião

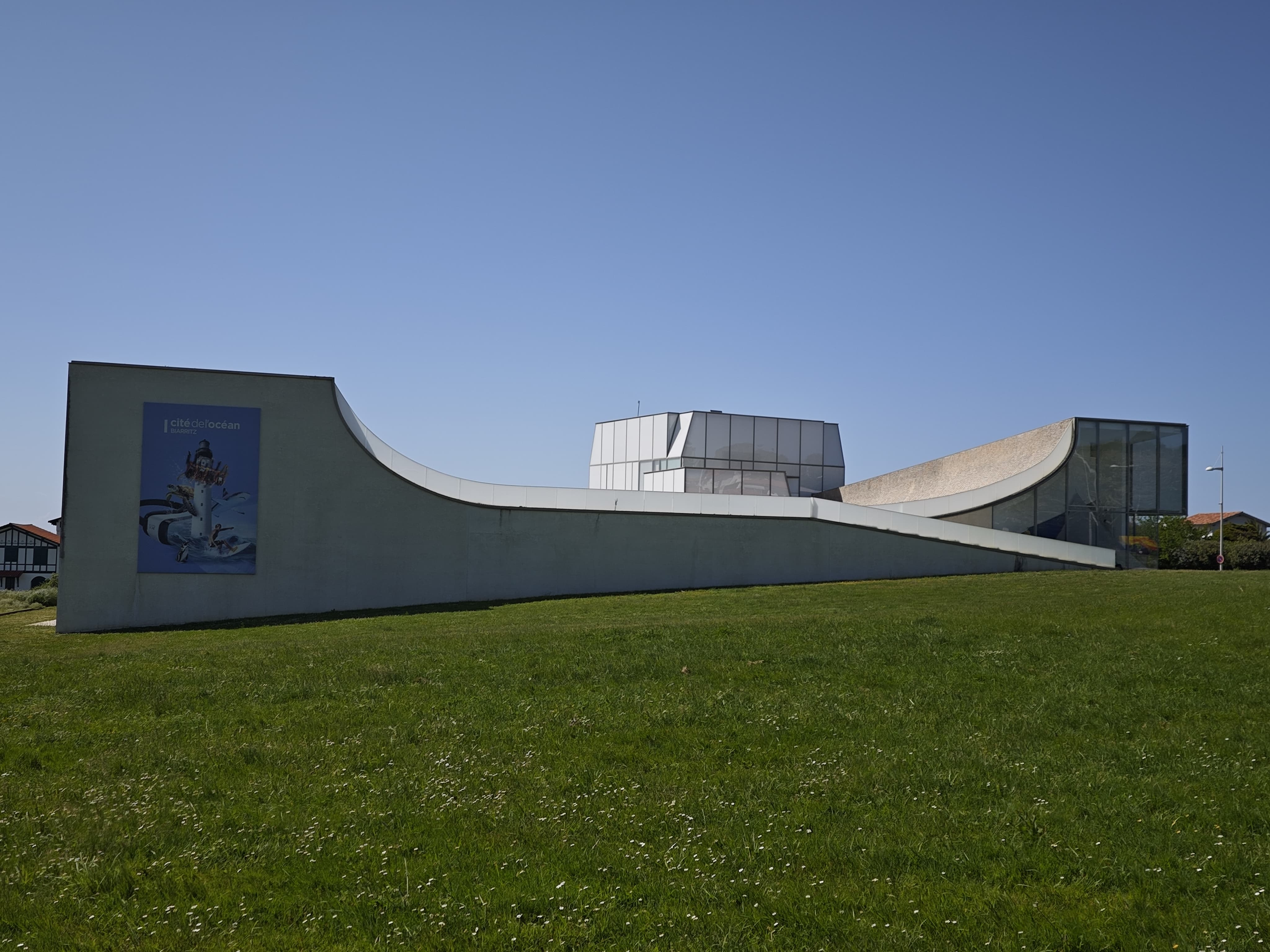
General view of the 'City of the Ocean'

The Cité de l'Océan et du Surf (Occitan: Cità de l'Ocean e del Sòrfa; Basque: Ozeano eta Surf Hiria), which opened in Biarritz, France in June 2011, is a museum designed by Steven Holl Architects in collaboration with Solange Fabião. The design was the winning scheme of an international competition held in 2005. Based on the concept "under the sky" and "under the sea," the building features a strongly curving roof, which also shapes the space of the public plaza, tilted towards the horizon and the ocean.

The 3800sm building, which houses gallery spaces, an auditorium, a restaurant, cafeteria and administrative offices, is part of a larger site, with a public landscape that flows seamlessly from the museum's plaza to the water.

For the Cité de l'Océan et du Surf, Steven Holl has received several awards, including the 2011 Emirates Glass LEAF Award, the 2012 American Architecture Award, and an Annual Design Review prize.
