= Lindemann Performing Arts Center =

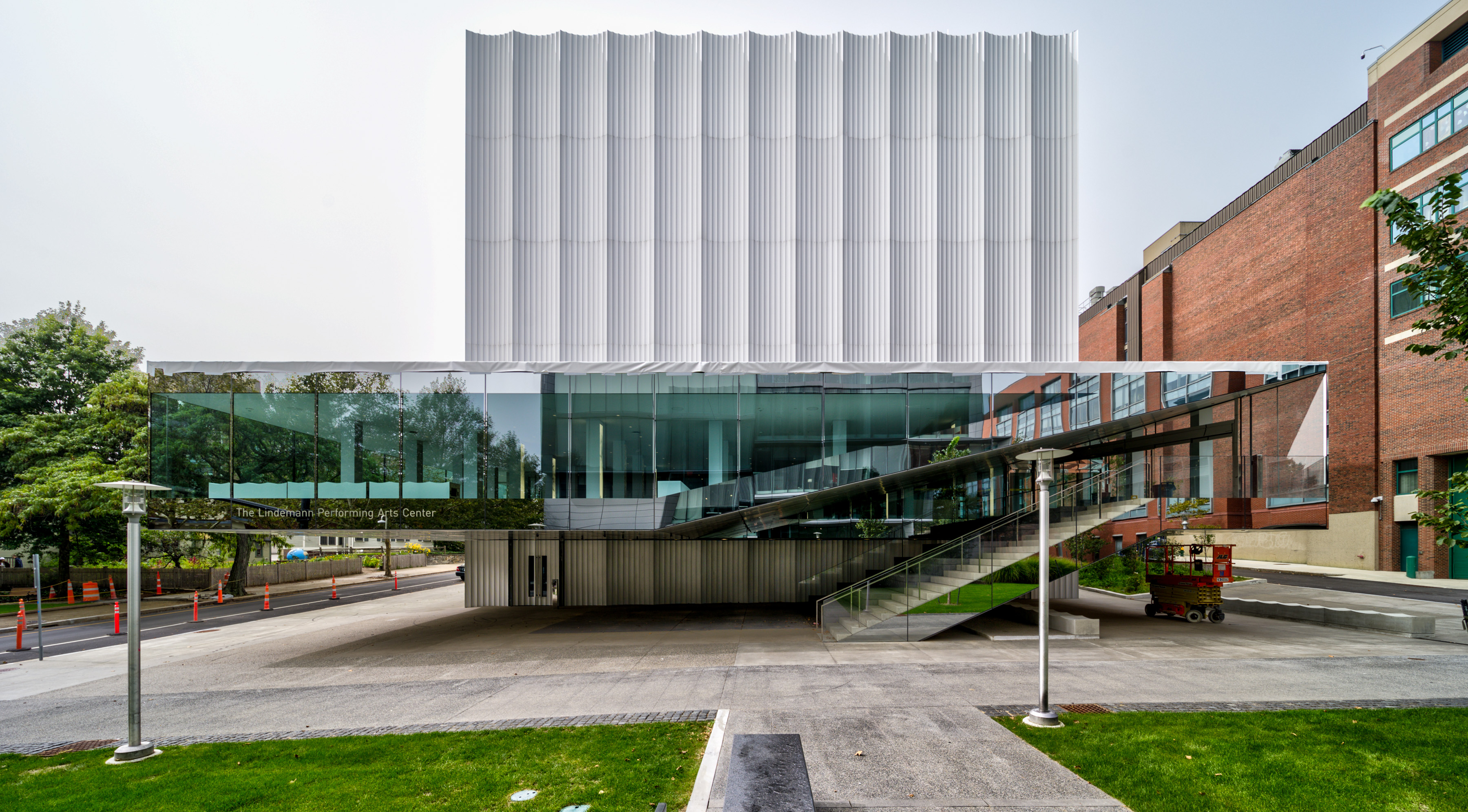
- Interactive map of Lindemann Performing Arts Center
- Address: 130 Angell Street
- Location: Brown University, Providence, RI
- Coordinates: 41.8282°N 71.4023°W
- Owner: Brown University
- Capacity: 625

Construction
- Groundbreaking: 2019
- Opened: 2023
- Architect: REX

The Lindemann Performing Arts Center is a performing and visual arts facility at Brown University in Providence, Rhode Island. The building is located at 144 Angell Street on Brown's main campus in the city's College Hill neighborhood, and opened in October 2023. The Lindemann and adjacent Perry and Marty Granoff Center for the Creative Arts are both used by the Brown Arts Institute and comprise part of the university's Perelman Arts District. The Arts Center is named for benefactor Frayda Lindemann and her husband George Lindemann.

== Architecture ==
Designed by Joshua Ramus of REX, the building features a main hall that physically adapts to accommodate a variety of performance configurations, in a manner similar to that of the firm's Wyly Theatre. The building's exterior is clad in fluted panels made of extruded aluminum. The Lindemann contains Brown's largest performance venue, with the main hall accommodating up to 625 seats in its most expanded configuration. The building's total square footage is 118,000.

The building was selected as the Editors Pick for The Architect's Newspaper's 2024 Best of Design Awards in the "Cultural" category. It received an "Honor Award" in Architecture from the New York chapter of the American Institute of Architects in 2025.

=== Construction ===
REX revealed the building's design in February 2019; construction on the building began later that year. Freeing up space for the structure's site required the relocation of a historic Victorian duplex from 130-132 Angell Street to a new site along Brown Street. Movement of the historic house was completed in 2018.

=== Main Hall ===
The Lindemann's Main Hall follows a new architectural typology for performing arts spaces. All six surfaces of the hall modulate physically and acoustically to create five distinct stage-audience configurations—experimental media, recital, end-stage, orchestra, and flat floor. An array of secondary modes are also possible. The automated and manually assisted performance equipment installed to make such transformations includes five suspended, four-tier seating gantries (two tiers for audience members and two for technical staff), forty adjustable acoustic reflector panels, seven motorized utility battens, three lighting bridges, two stage lifts, three orchestra platform lifts, six telescoping orchestra risers, three seating wagon lifts, a three-unit retractable seating system, five seating wagons, a ring of deployable acoustic curtains, and a complete technical gridiron fifty-five feet above the floor. The main hall transforms into any of the five primary configurations with five technicians in three hours.

The five pre-set configurations can accommodate Brown’s 100-piece orchestra (with a 70-person chorus), individual recitals, major theatrical productions, immersive video and scenic projection with 40-channel ambisonic audio, digital cinema, and traditional lectures and receptions, among many other options. The main hall seats 275 people in the end-stage configuration, 388 for recitals, and 530 in the orchestra configuration.

On the lower level, the building contains three additional rehearsal spaces that double as venues: William Riley Hall, an orchestra rehearsal room doubles as a 135-seat performance space for smaller ensembles, the Movement Lab, a dance rehearsal room doubles as a 98-seat informal dance performance space, and the Performance Lab, a theater rehearsal room doubles as an intimate 50-seat performance space.

=== Infinite Composition ===
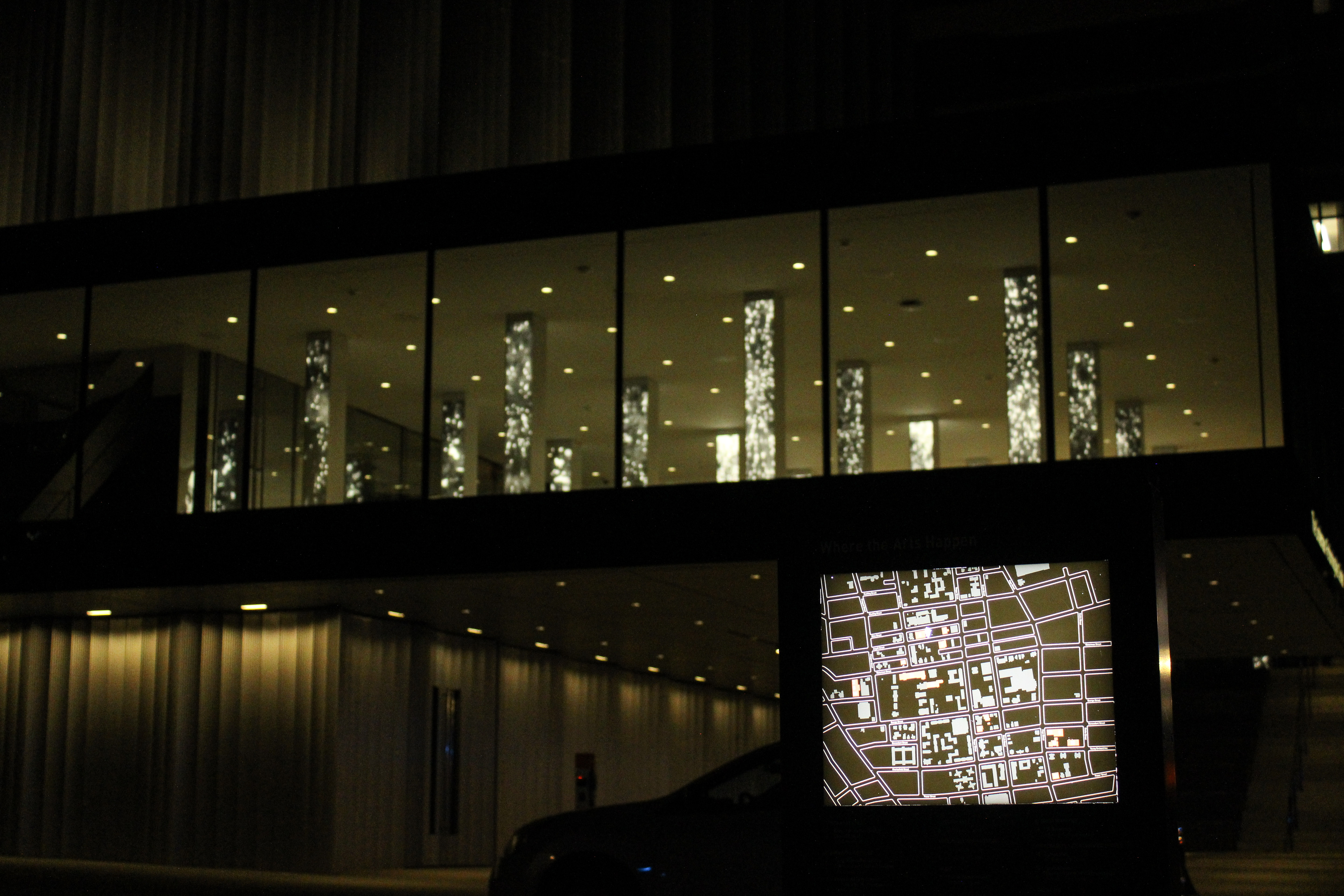
View of Infinite Composition at night from Perelman Arts District map on Angell Street

Infinite Composition is an artwork by Leo Villareal which consists of illuminated panels of white LEDs that flow in a variety of patterns across 30 columns in the building's lobby.

== Gallery ==
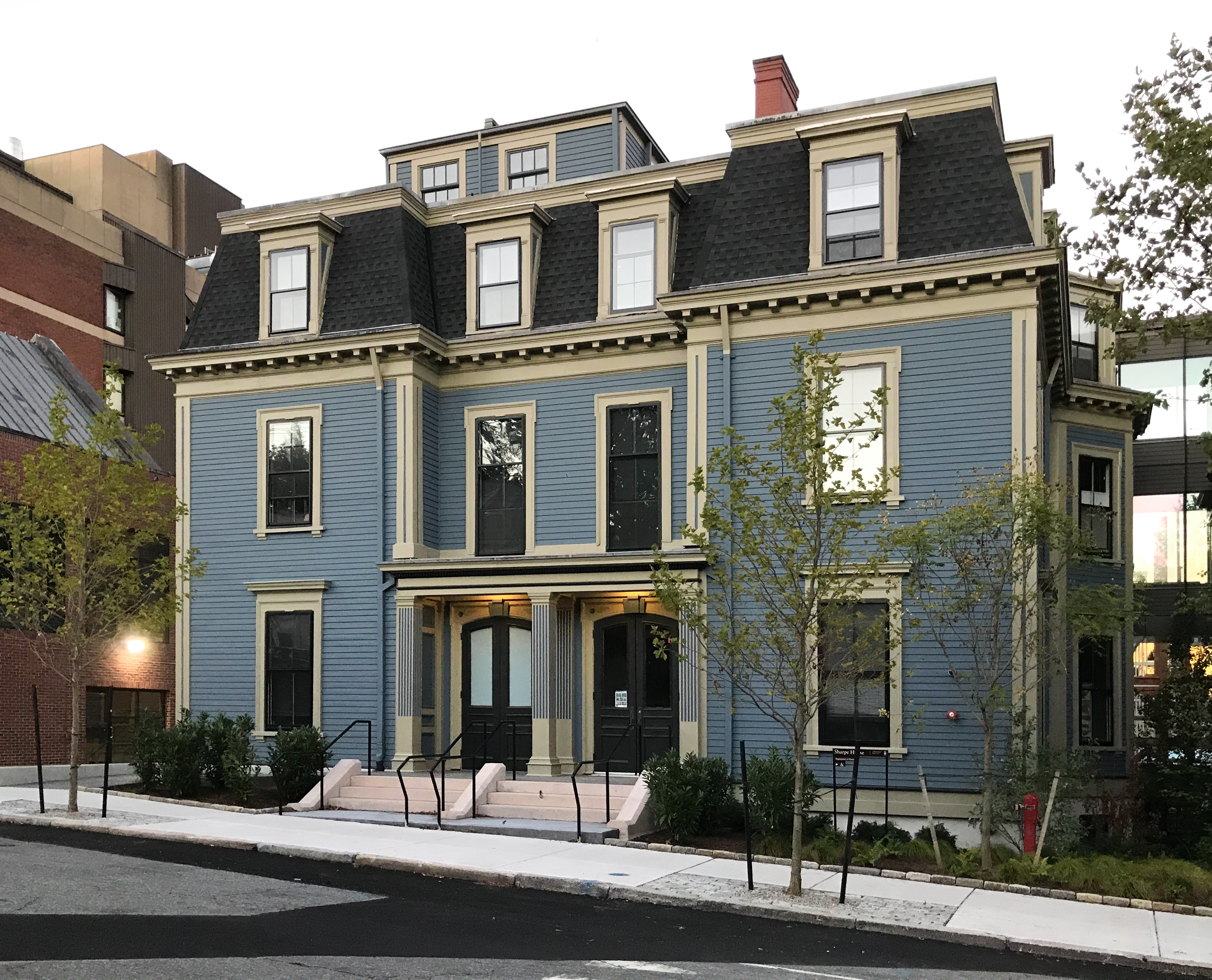
Sharpe House was relocated from Angell Street to a new site along Brown Street

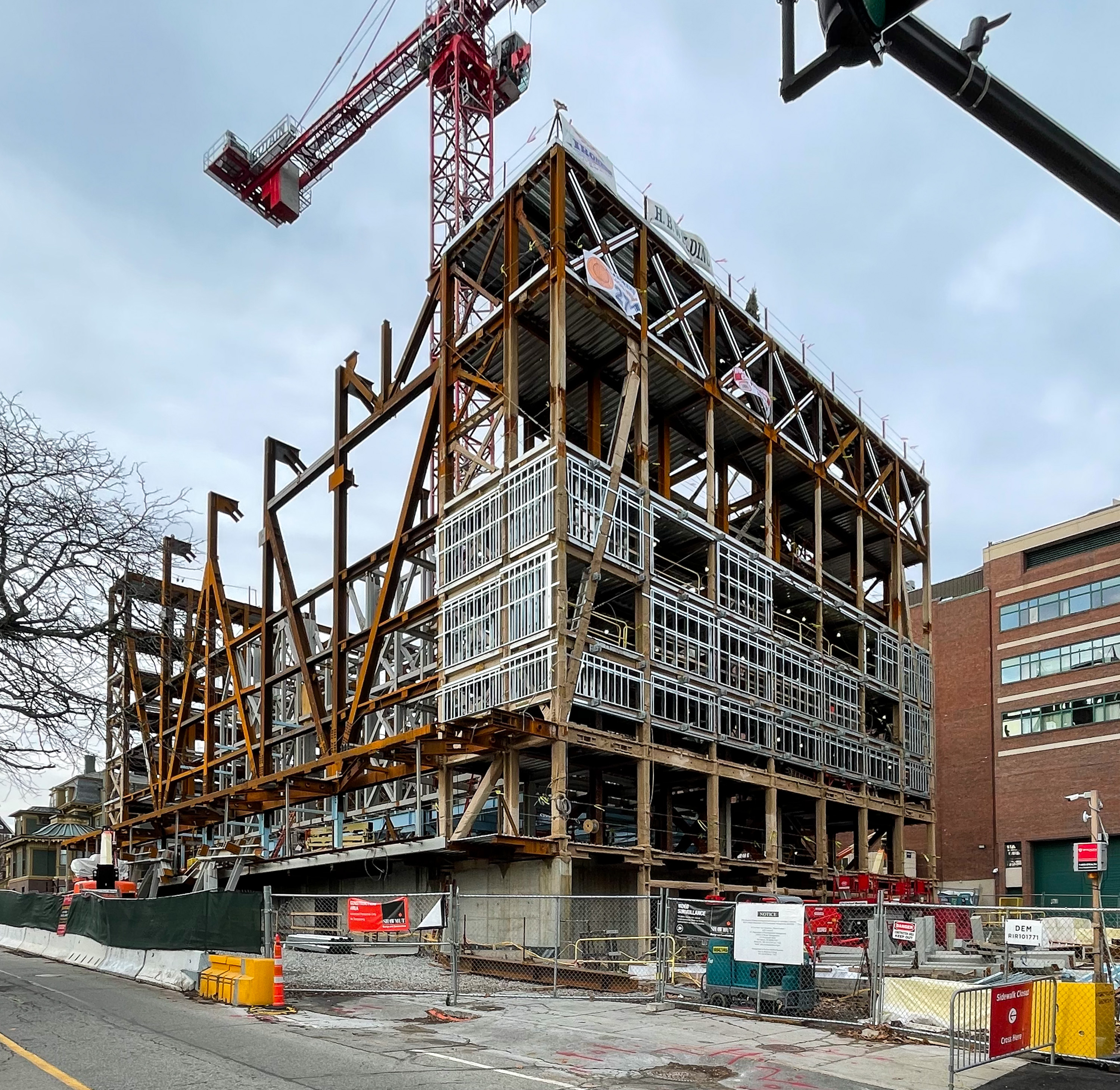
The building under construction, December 2020

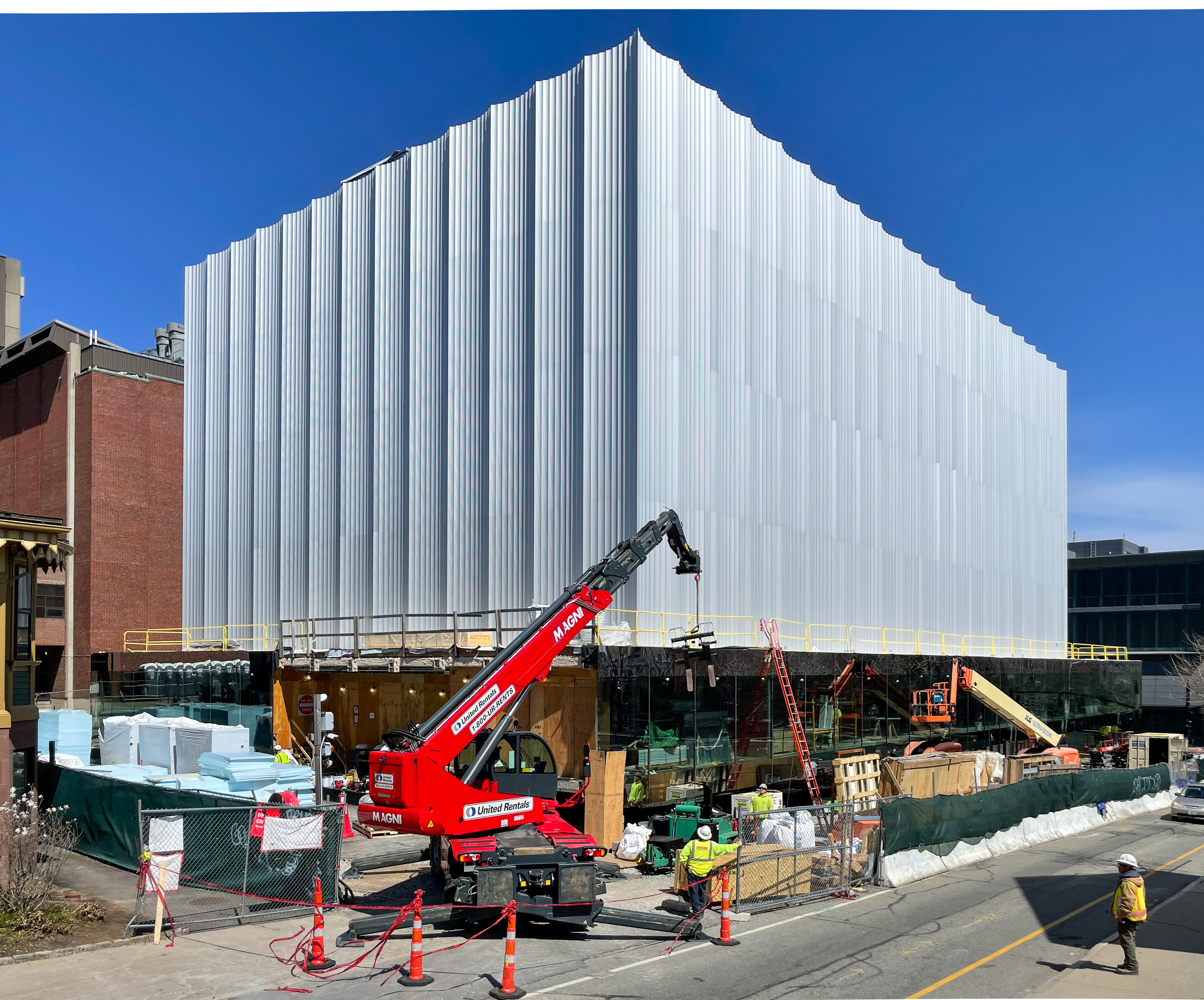
The building under construction, April 2022

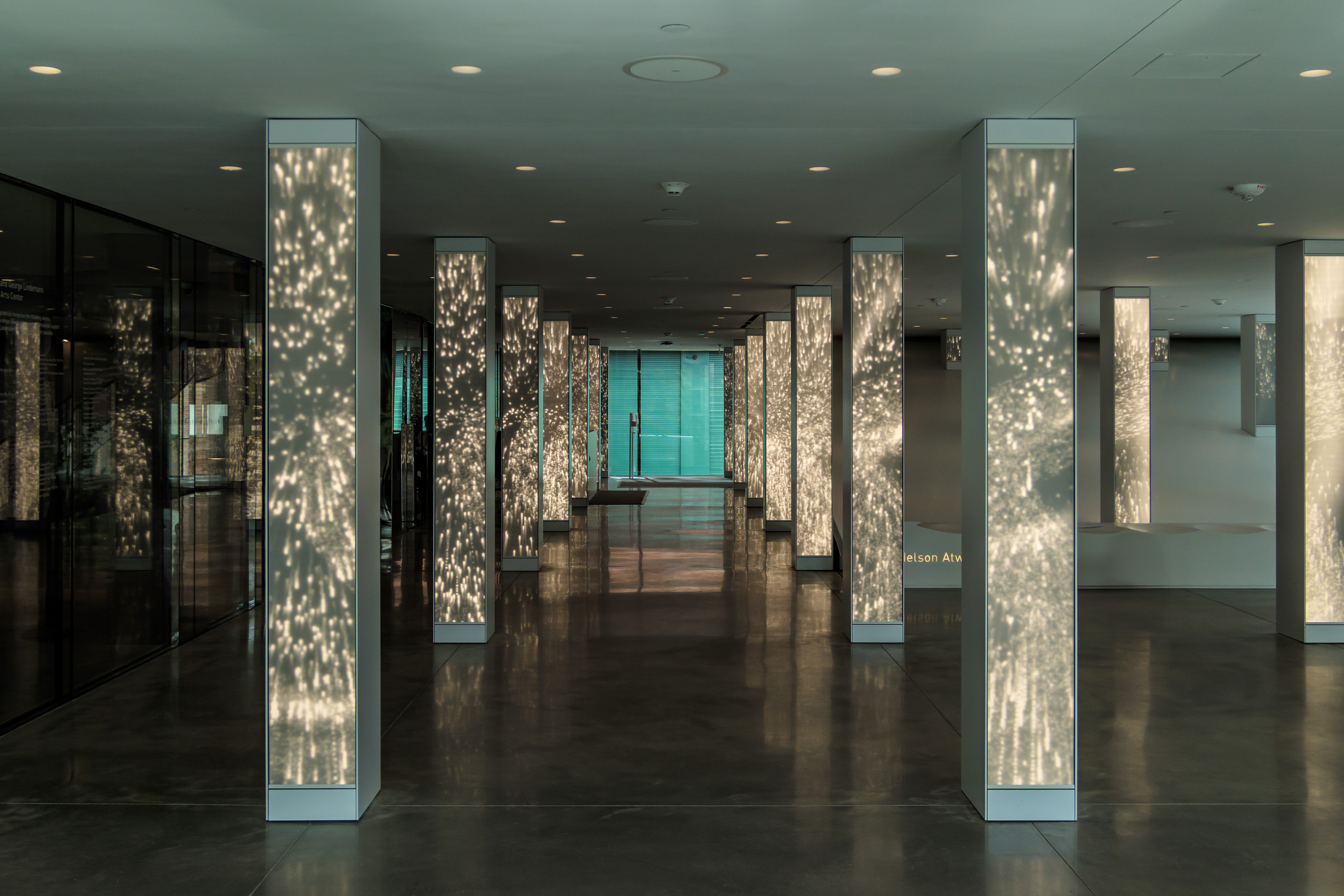
Leo Villareal's Infinite Composition in the lobby
