= NYCxDesign =

Annual design festival in New York City

NYCxDESIGN
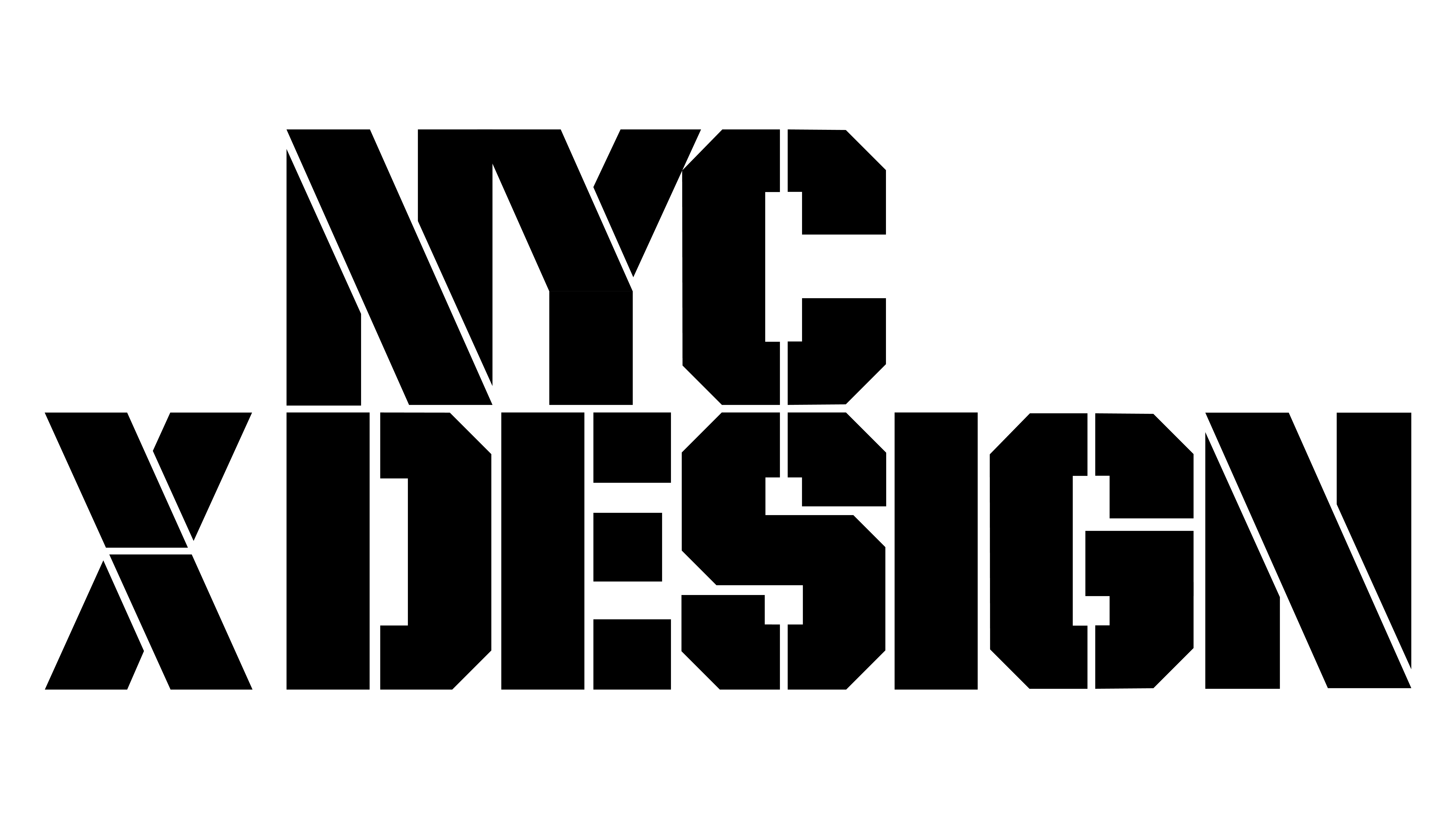
- NYCxDESIGN official logo
- Frequency: Annually
- Location: New York City
- Country: United States
- Founded: 2012
- Website: www.nycxdesign.com

NYCxDESIGN is a non-profit organization responsible for organizing the NYCxDESIGN Festival, New York City's official annual citywide celebration of Design, which takes place every May. The festival is made up of independently hosted trade fairs, exhibitions, open studios, talks and panel discussions, and other in-person, and virtual events that take place in the five boroughs of New York City. The participants highlight a range of design and architecture related fields including furniture design, interior design, graphic design, fashion design, entertainment, technology, and art. New York City mayor Eric Adams spoke at the opening ceremony of its 10th edition in 2022.

The organization also produces year-round education programming, including the poster series Ode to NYC, the Emerging Designer Showcase, NYCxDESIGNxSOUVENIR, and the podcast The Mic, hosted by Debbie Millman, and Design Pavilion, the outdoor design exhibition and interactive installations at landmark venues, free and open to the public.

== History and operation ==
In 2012 NYCEDC started NYCxDESIGN as a municipal initiative steered by a committee of leaders from New York City's design community. The 2019 edition was estimated to have attracted 300,000 visitors with its 400+ events, which resulted in a total expenditure of approximately $111 million in New York City. The city announced that SANDOW would be taking over the operations in 2020. Starting in 2021, NYCxDESIGN has transitioned to become an independent non-profit organization. In 2023, Ilene Shaw took over as the Executive Director of the 501(c)(3) organization.

In March 2024, in honor of the 12th year of the NYCxDESIGN Festival, the organization announced the launch of a Keynote program. Through this, a daily keynote is presented throughout the Festival week, inviting designers and brands of all disciplines from around the world to share inspiring stories and vision.

== Awards ==
The NYCxDesign Awards is an annual event presented by Interior Design Magazine and was started in 2015. It serves as the concluding event of the NYCxDesign Festival.

The awards recognize excellence in various design disciplines, from architecture and interiors to student work and consumer products.

Notable 2025 Winners

Exhibition/Installation: Infinite Harmony: Year of the Snake, Oculus by Gluckman Tang Architects

NYC's Shining Moment: Korean Cultural Center New York by L'Observatoire International and Samoo Architects

Emerging/Independent Products Designer: Mutual Core by L'Impatience
