= Parc du Thabor =

Park in Brittany, France

Thabor Park
- Parc du Thabor
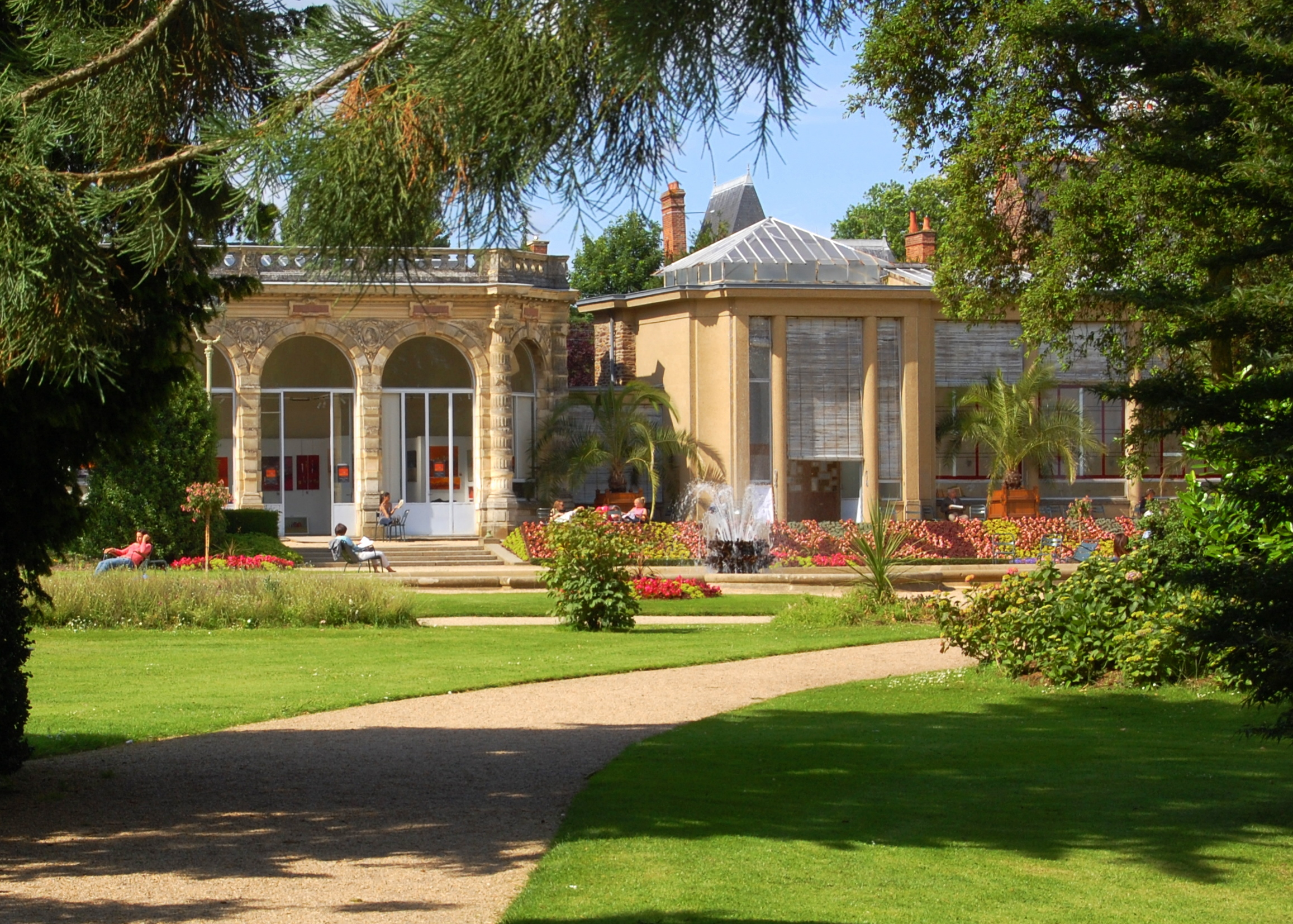
- View of the orangery of the Thabor park

- Location within Rennes Location within Brittany Location within France
- Type: Urban park
- Location: Rennes, Brittany, France
- Coordinates: 48°06′51″N 1°40′12″W
- Area: 10 hectares (25 acres)
- Elevation: 56m
- Created: 18th century
- Etymology: Mount Tabor
- Owner: City of Rennes

The Parc du Thabor (French: Parc du Thabor, Breton: Liorzhoù-kêr an Thabor), is a 10-hectare (25-acre) near the city centre of Rennes, in Brittany, France. It has a mix of the characteristics of a French garden, an English garden and a large botanical garden. Its name refers to a mountain overlooking Lake Tiberias in Israel, Mount Tabor.

A place of public walk before the French Revolution, the park was embellised between 1866 and 1868 through the contributions of Denis Bühler by arrangement of various points in the lawn, the French gardens and the English gardens. At the beginning of the 20th century, the southern part of the park, called "les Catherinettes", was arranged in extension of the English garden.

== Location ==
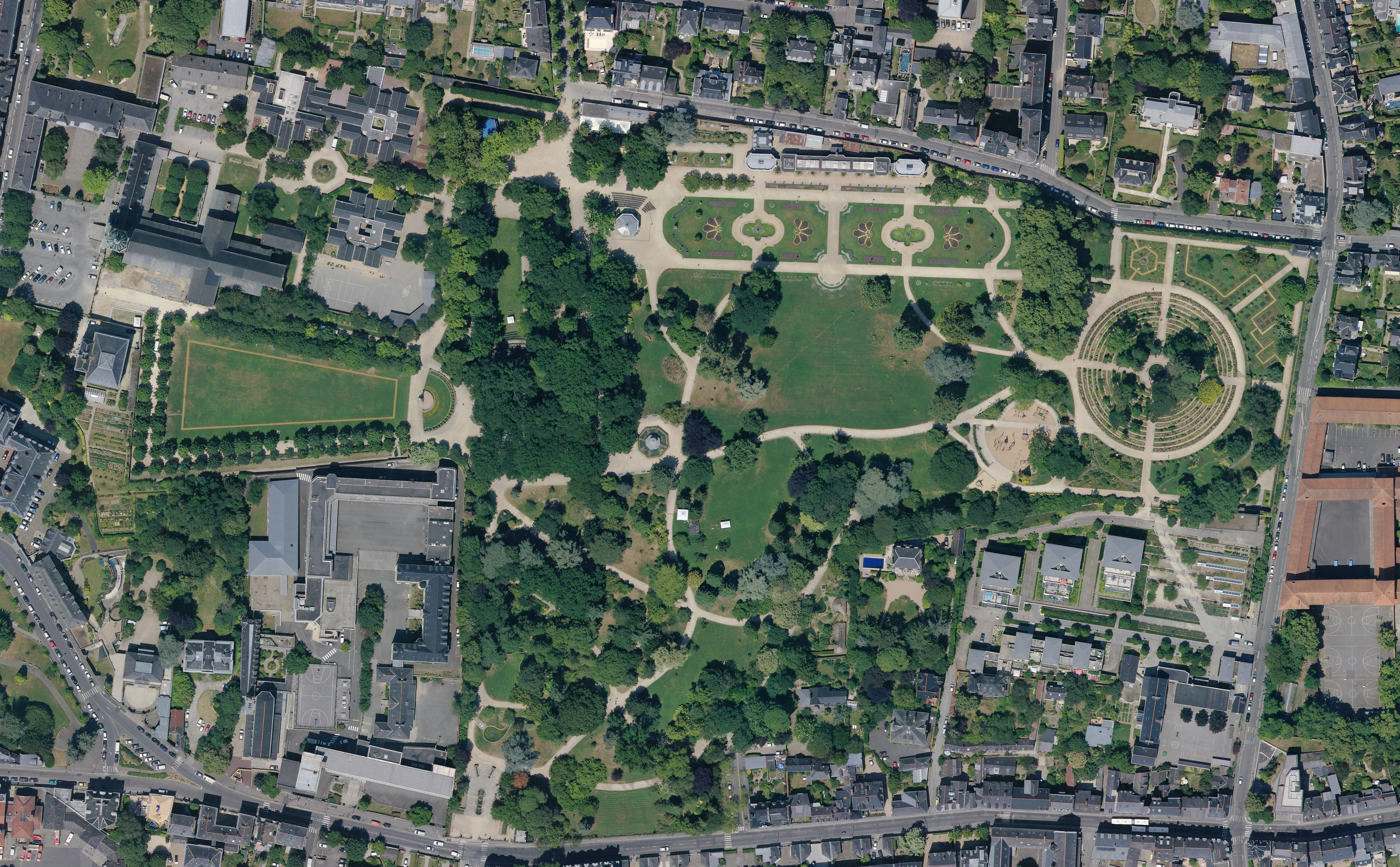
Aerial view (IGNF, 2017)

The Parc du Thabor is located in central Rennes, in the Thabor - Saint-Hélier - Alphonse Guérin district. It is flanked by Rue Martenot and Rue de Paris to the south, Boulevard de la Duchesse-Anne to the east and Rue de la Palestine to the north. The west of the park is narrowed between Notre-Dame-en-Saint-Melaine church to the north and the Anne de Bretagne collège to the south; it can be accessed by Place Saint-Melaine, the closest entrance to the center of the city.

Access to the park is provided via six open entrances to the various streets mentioned above. It is served by bus lines C3 and 44; the nearest metro station is Sainte-Anne.

== History ==
=== Origins of the park ===
The first mentions of the park date from 1610 according to Paul Banéat, curator of the Archaeological Museum in the early 20^{th} century. It was the Benedictine monks who named the mound, in reference to Mount Tabor in the Bible.

During the Middle Ages and the Ancien Régime, the fortified enclosure did not allow the extension of the gardens: only the lands of the convents were large enough to allow the creation of orchards and gardens.

The lands of Thabor were a dependency of the Saint-Melaine abbey, where they were mainly used as an orchard. In the 17th century, the Benedictine monks opened their gardens, but they were reserved for males. One reached the Thabor by a passage between the interior cloister of the abbey and its vegetable garden, then by a porte-cochère. Following the great fire of 1720, Thabor became the seat of the bishopric. The bishopric palace was built there and part of the gardens became those of the bishopric.

=== Development as a public garden ===
During the Revolution, all ecclesiastical domains were attached to the State. On May 10, 1793, Rennes became the owner of these lands following an exchange with the State: the army wishing to create an arsenal in the municipal hospice. The Hospice des Catherinettes and the buildings of Saint-Melaine as well as its vegetable garden became the general hospice. A public promenade was opened on the rest of the grounds of the bishopric and the Benedictines; the courtyard of the bishopric is the main entrance.

The decree of 7 Ventôse year III (February 25, 1795) required the establishment of a central school in each capital of the department. The State chose the episcopal palace to house the central school of natural history as well as a museum of natural history and arts and a school of botany. A school of botany was created and the bishop's garden became a botanical garden, and received the new name of "Jardin des Plantes". The creation of the botanical garden and its collection of plants was the work of Professor Jean Danthon. From 1807 to 1840, the Jardin des Plantes was run by Professor Jean-Vincent-Yves Degland (1787 - 1856) then by Pontaillé. On 11 Floréal year X (May 1, 1802), a law abolished the central schools: when it own closed in 1805, the city recovered the charge of the natural history museum and the botany school.

When the Concordat of 1801 was signed, the bishop recovered his palace, but not the gardens which remained the property of the city. Source of long conflicts, the only access to the garden remained the bishop's palace. The city opened an access by the rue de Fougères, but the bishop said "he is embarrassed by the visitors, who passed right by his windows". In 1812, an access leading to the rue de la Palestine made it possible to get around the problem. From 1811 to 1814, a legal battle ensued between the bishopric, which wanted to recover its old property, and the city of Rennes, which wanted to keep it. In 1814, the count of Ferrières, extraordinary commissioner sent to Brittany by Louis XVIII, decides that the bishop can recover his old pleasure garden: the public promenade is thereby shortened.

=== 19th century enlargements ===
The mandate of the mayor Louis de Lorgeril (1821 - 1830) was marked by the purchase of plots to open the park by avoiding the bishopric: the acquisition of the Grosco land in 1823 allowed easier access to the promenade. In 1826, the demolition of the Saint-Jean church located next to Notre-Dame-en-Saint-Melaine, abandoned since the Revolution, opened the current Saint-Melaine entrance.

In 1845, the redevelopment projects within the framework of the creation of a horticultural school presented the alignment of rectangular beds characteristic of the rigor of the botanical classification.

=== Denis and Eugène Bühler design ===
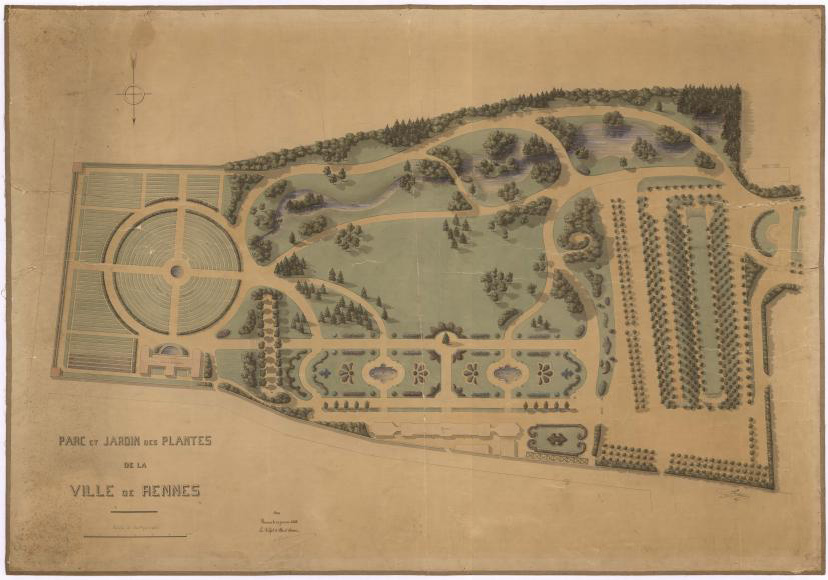
Jardin des Plantes de la Ville de Rennes designed by Denis Bühler in 1867

Following various expansions, the development was entrusted in 1866 and 1868 to the Bühler brothers, gardeners and landscape architects, introduced to the town hall by François-Charles Oberthür. In addition to the French-style gardens expressly requested by the mayor, Denis Bühler proposed to create the first landscaped garden in Rennes and to move the botanical garden, then to the west of the orangery, to the east of the park. This relocation project included the construction of a botany school, a fruit farming school, a vegetable school and a medicinal school; it was only partially realized, but reflected the idea of the time of a “school garden”.

Conflicts of influence arose between the designer of the gardens Denis Bühler, the curator-professor of the botanical garden and Jean-Baptiste Martenot, architect of the town. This, along with the high cost of the project (100,000 gold francs), prompted the town hall to ask Bühler in 1867 only to design complete plans (including earthwork plans and planting of plants). This decision led to a slowdown in the development works.

The greenhouses, the aviary, the gates, the orangery and the bandstand were designed by the municipal architect Jean-Baptiste Martenot. Statues by the sculptor from Rennes, Charles Lenoir, were installed between 1890 and 1895 as well as copies of sculptures from Versailles which were presented in Paris in 1889 before being installed in 1895.

=== 20th century changes ===
The latest additions were made at the end of the 19th century with the transfer of the office of Catherinettes in 1891 and the acquisition of the Perrigault plot. In 1901, the project of the road engineer Blin, adopted by the special commission, made it possible to take advantage of the steep slope of the land to integrate a waterfall and build a monumental entrance.

During the occupation of Rennes, shelter trenches in the event of bombardment were set up in the park. During the bombardment of May 29, 1943, a bomb fell in one of these trenches, killing 25 people. On July 17, 1944, another bombardment killed 25 people again.

To the south of the botanical garden and the rose garden, municipal greenhouses, called serres de la Duchesse Anne (transl. Duchess Anne's greenhouses) were built in 1936 to meet the needs of the park's gardeners, the greenhouses between the orangery being far too small to obtain the plants needed for the garden. In 2002, the city of Rennes centralized the production of plants for all of Rennes' parks and gardens in the Champeaux horticultural center. The Duchess Anne greenhouses were demolished at the start of 2005 to free up the site for social housing, as well as a neighborhood library and a new entrance to Park, leading to Lucien Rose Square.

== Facilities ==
The 10 ha 62 of the Thabor public garden are made up of two promenades - the Du Guesclin square and l’Enfer to the west - a French-style garden opposite the orangery to the north, a large landscaped garden in the center and south, and finally a botanical garden and a rose garden to the east.

The Du Guesclin square L'enfer The French gardens The botanical garden Denis Bühler's landscape garden Les Catherinettes

=== Du Guesclin square ===
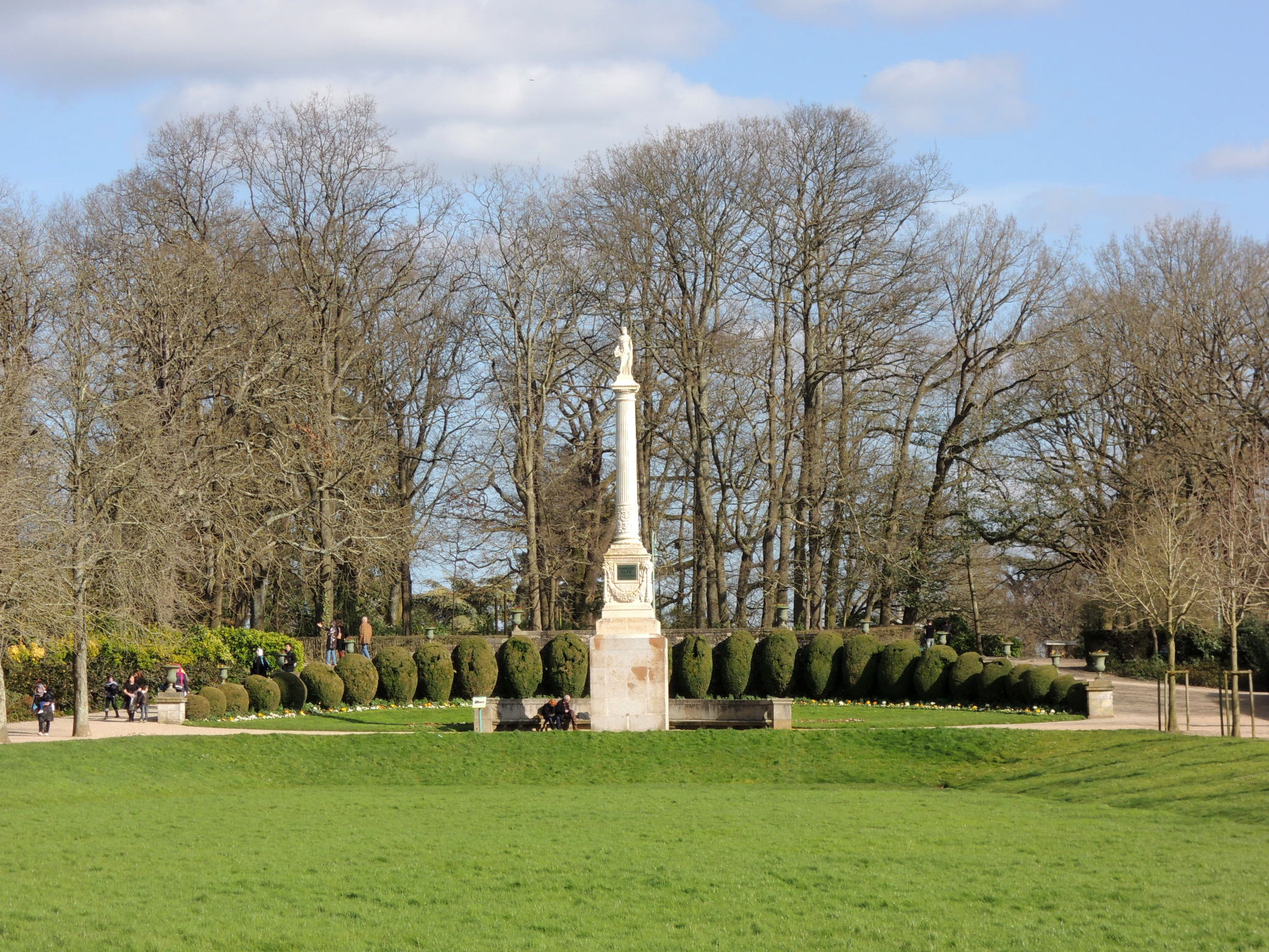
The July column of the du Guesclin square completely renovated in 2014

The Carré Du Guesclin is a trapezoid-shaped lawn with a promenade lined with chestnut trees. On the short side, a stone arch highlighting a July column that overlooks a bowling alley.

Overlooking Place Saint-Melaine, the former forecourt of the abbey, the entrance is marked by a monumental gate, bearing the coat of arms of Rennes. It is a work by Jean-Baptiste Martenot which replaced the grid previously executed by Vincent Boullé, municipal architect of Rennes during the Restoration. The old gate was supported by two pillars crowned with cast iron vases. A low wall extended on either side of the pillars, punctuated by six slightly projecting pilasters, was also adorned with cast iron vases.

A July column, created by Jean-Baptiste Barré, was erected in 1835 in memory of two people from Rennes, Louis Vaneau, polytechnician, and François Papu, surgeon, son of a dentist practicing in Rennes, who died in Paris in 1830 during the July Revolution. The first stone was laid on 1 May 1831 on the plans of the municipal architect Charles Millardet. Although solemnly erected in 1835, during the Third Republic, the column was deemed. This monument consists of a base as well as a column surmounted by a small statue representing Liberty. The column was restored and completed in March 2012. The statue, which was too altered, was replaced by a stone copy by Lavoux made from a plaster cast and, for the details of the face, by extrapolation from other works by Jean-Baptiste Barré.

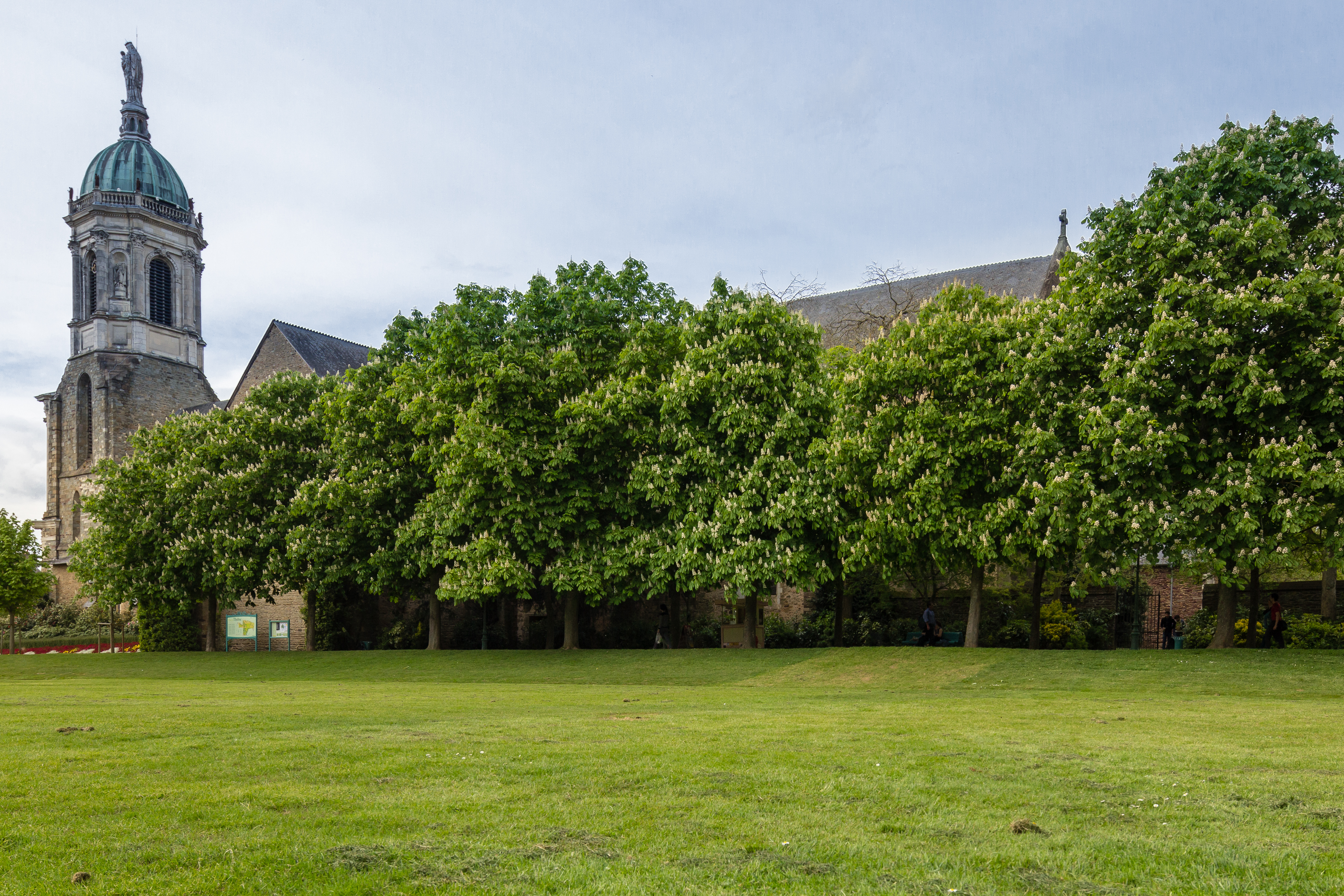
View of the Notre-Dame-en-Saint-Melaine church from the bowling alley, in 2013

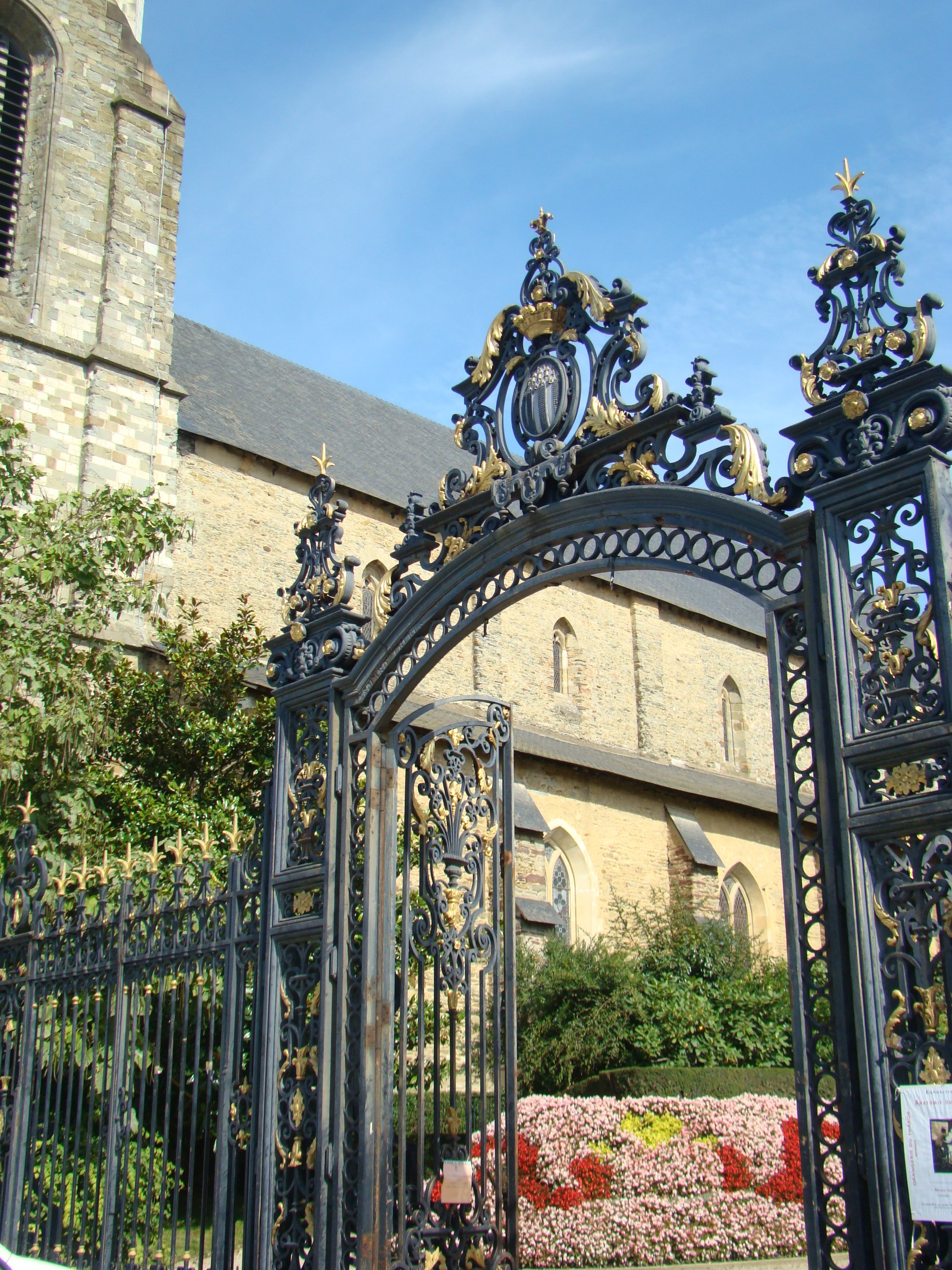
View of the Place Saint-Melaine entrance gate and the mosaics on the terraces

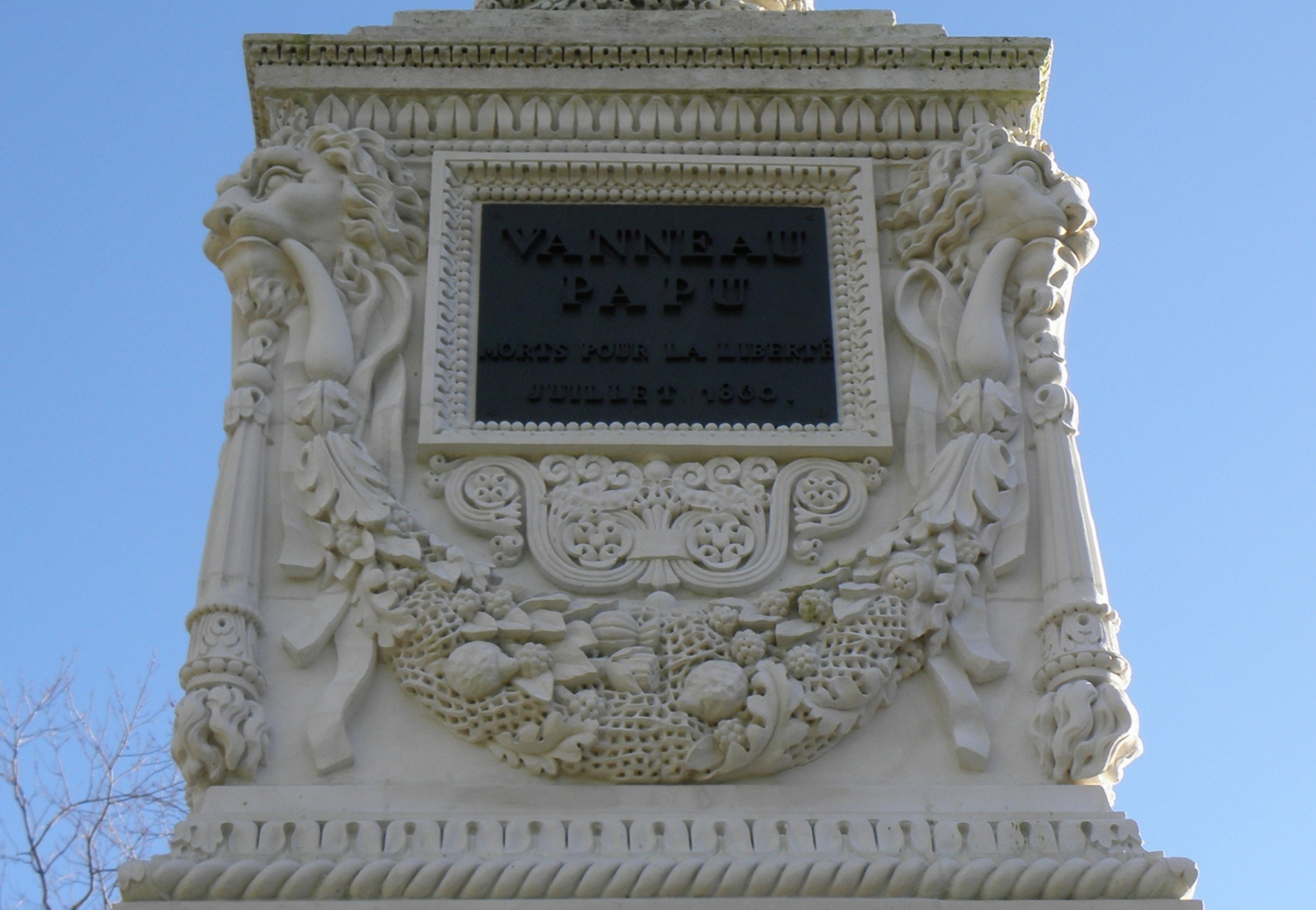
The July column, with an inscription saying "Vanneau Papu, dead for liberty, July 1830"

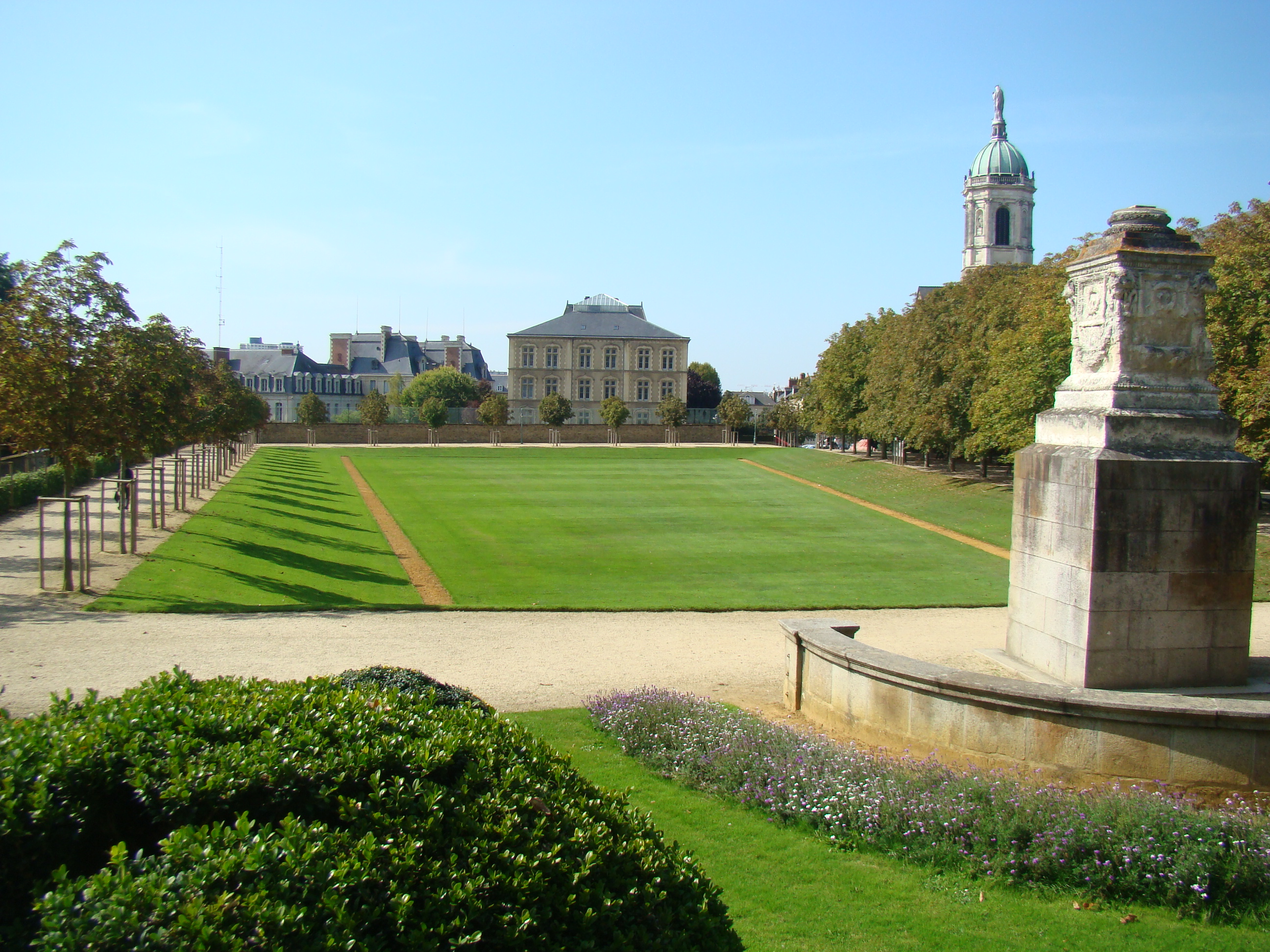
The du Guesclin square seen from the stone arch in 2008

=== L'Enfer ===
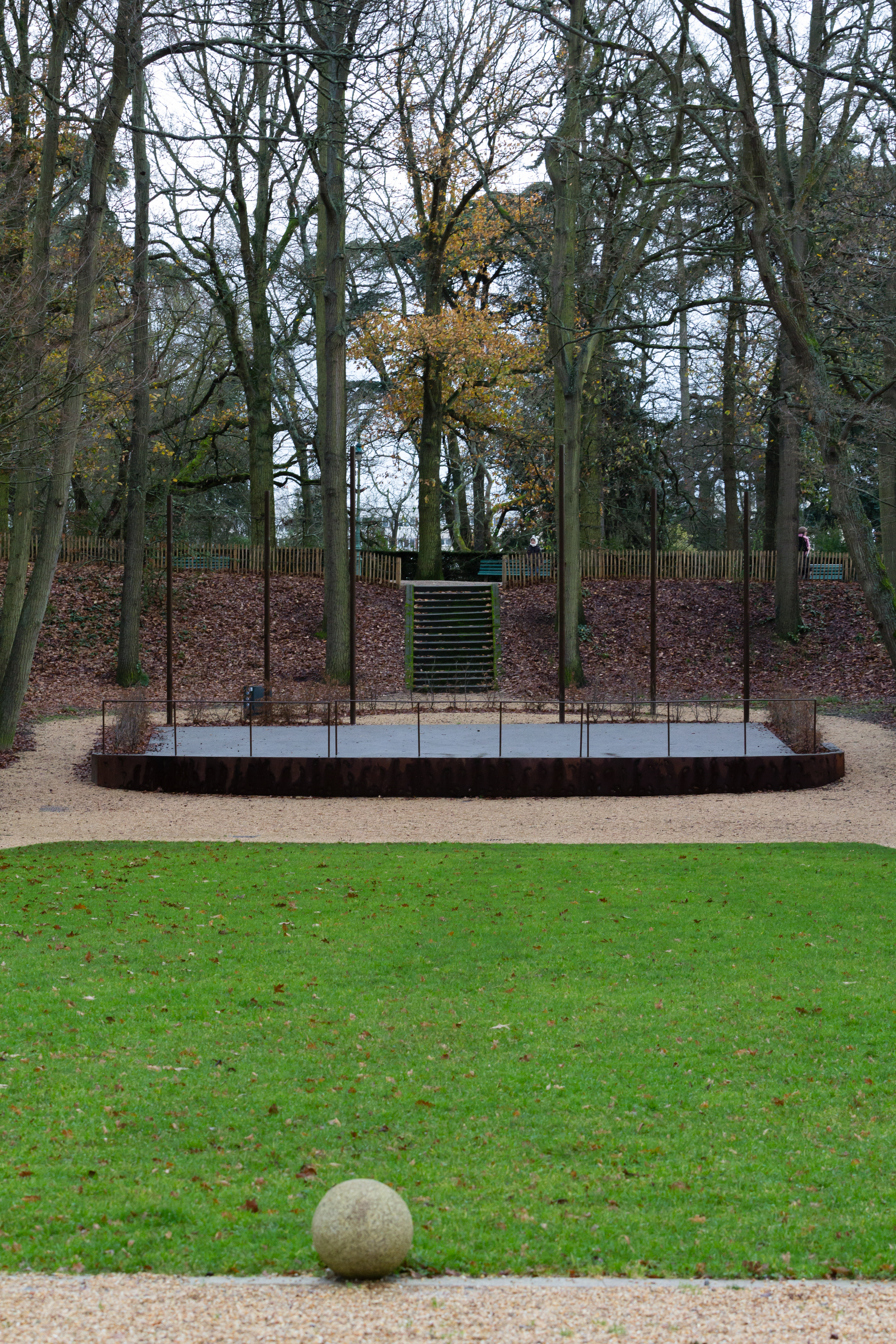
L'Enfer at the end of 2012, refurbished.

Behind the square Du Guesclin, there is l'Enfer (transl. Hell), a vast area dug longitudinally on the north–south axis.

After the fire that ravaged Rennes in 1720, the city planned to build a large water reservoir, in order to have sufficient reserves to put out a hypothetical fire. They obtained permission from the monks to excavate the site, paid them a fee so that the hole would not be filled in, but never built the reservoir. The monks maintained it and sailed there. The name "Hell" would come from the quarrels between the Benedictine monks and the bishop: the monks owned Hell and the bishop owned the adjoining land (called by opposition the "Paradise"), but these first were boating on their parcel, which irritated the bishop who would have said "this place there is hell!".

There is a table football, a stone table tennis table and two sculptures made between 1889 and 1895 by the students of the Beaux-Arts de Rennes which face each other on the east side of the promenade:

- Cupid Taking a Butterfly from a Rose, copy of a statue Cupid Taking a Butterfly in the Louvre Museum, begun by Antoine-Denis Chaudet and completed by Pierre Cartellier in the early 19th century.
- Boy with Thorn, copy of a statue from the Louvre or Versailles.
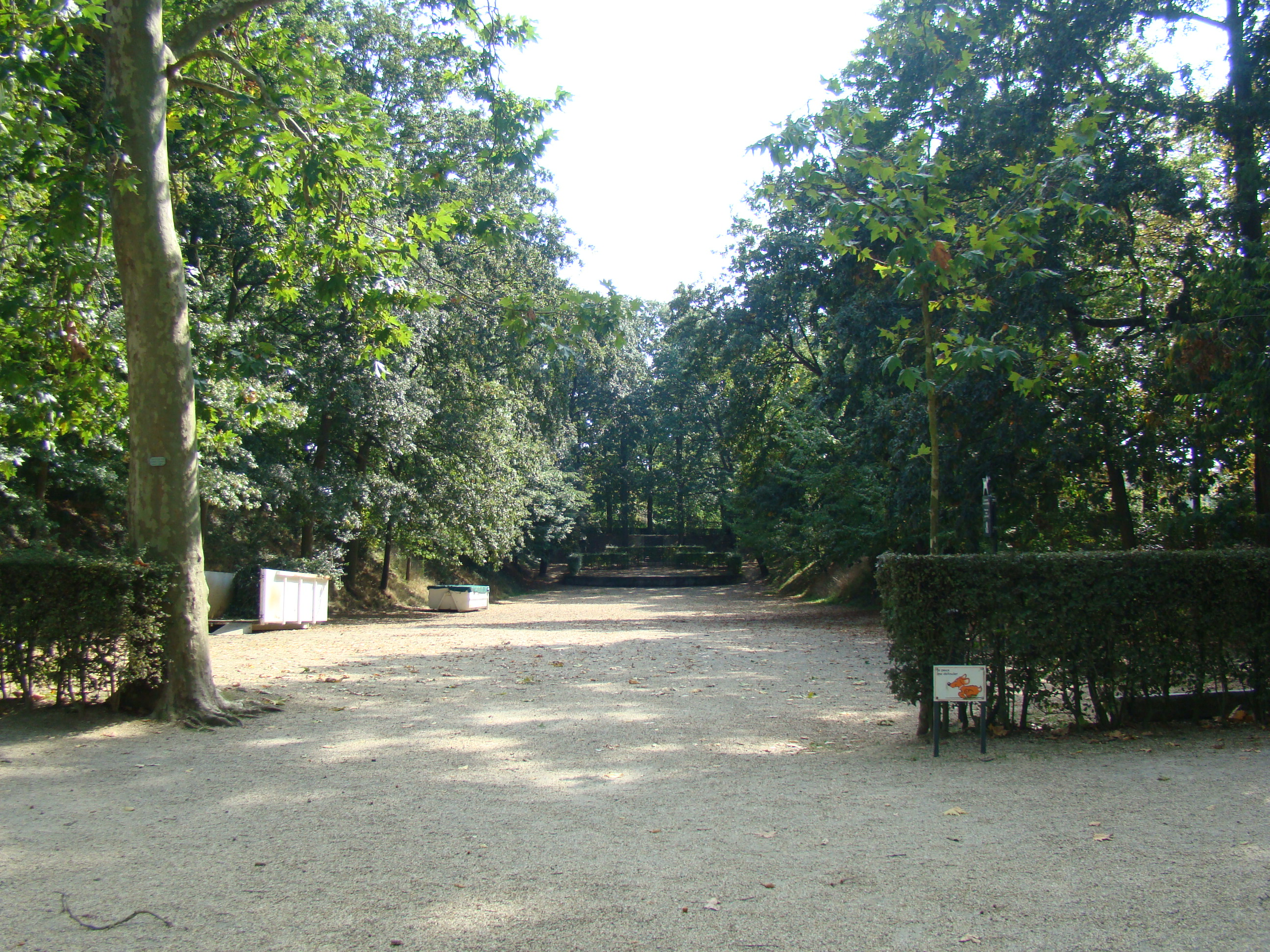
L'Enfer in 2008

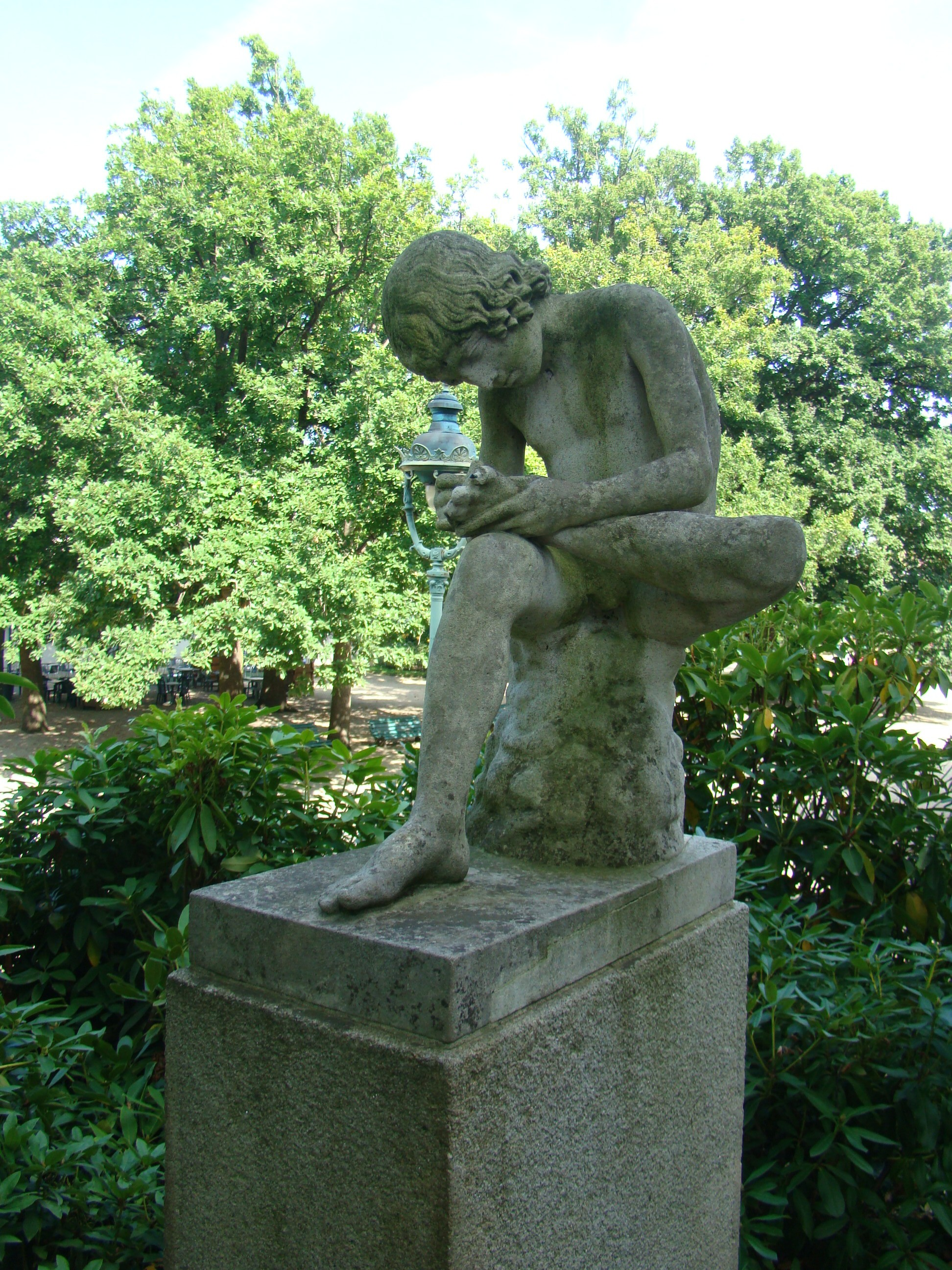
Boy with Thorn

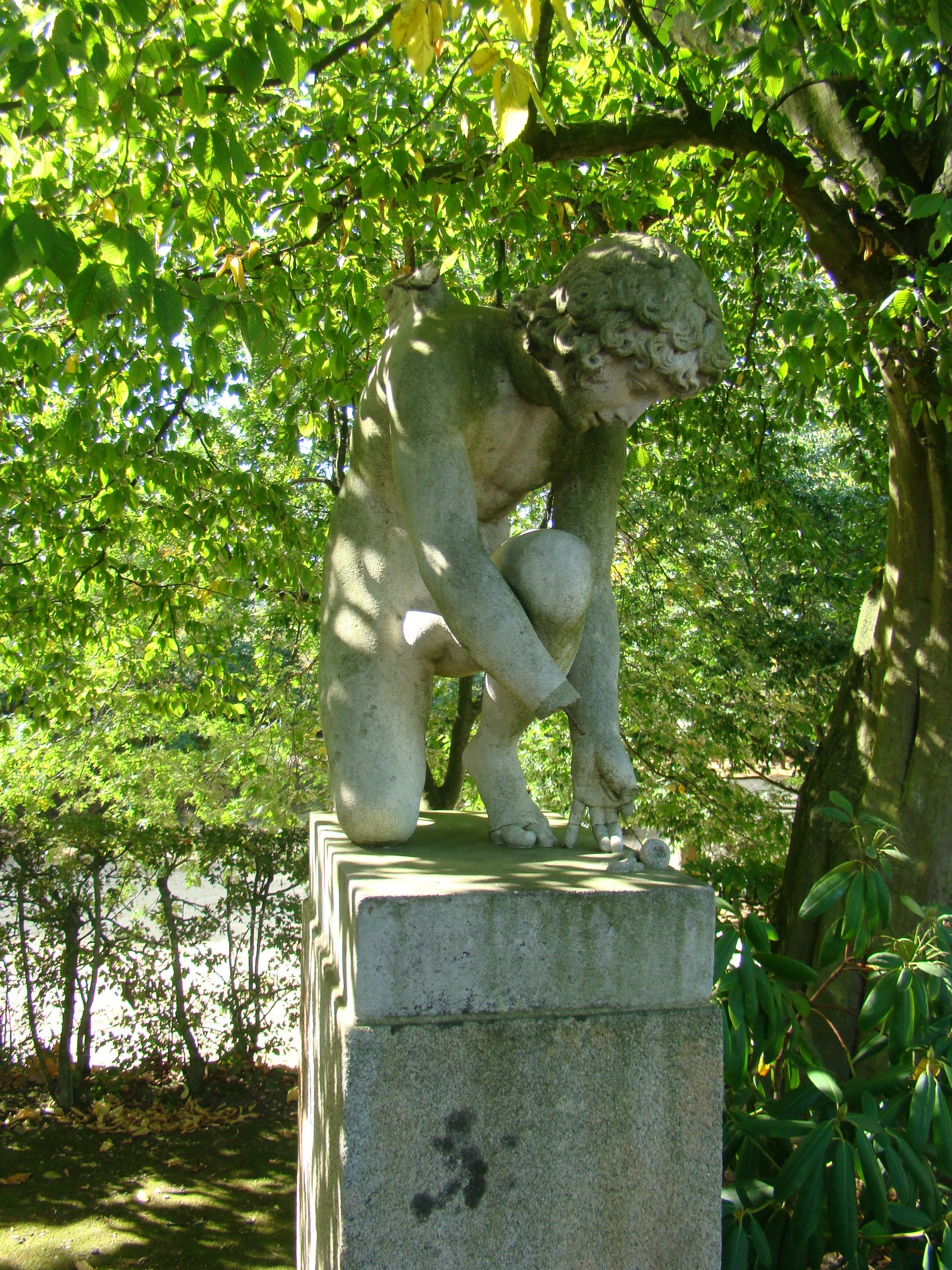
Cupid taking a butterfly from a rose

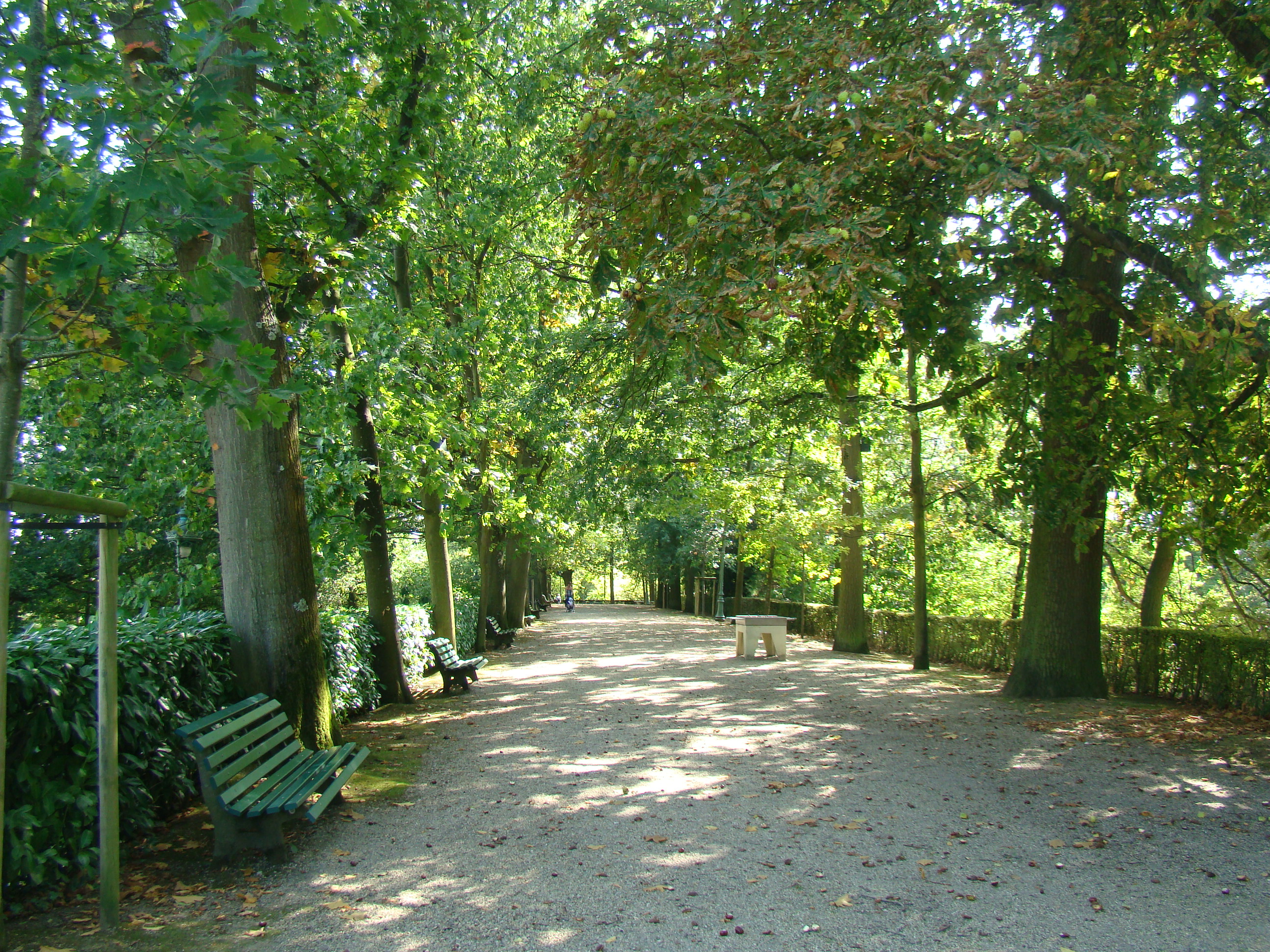
East Walk of Hell, with the table football

=== French gardens ===
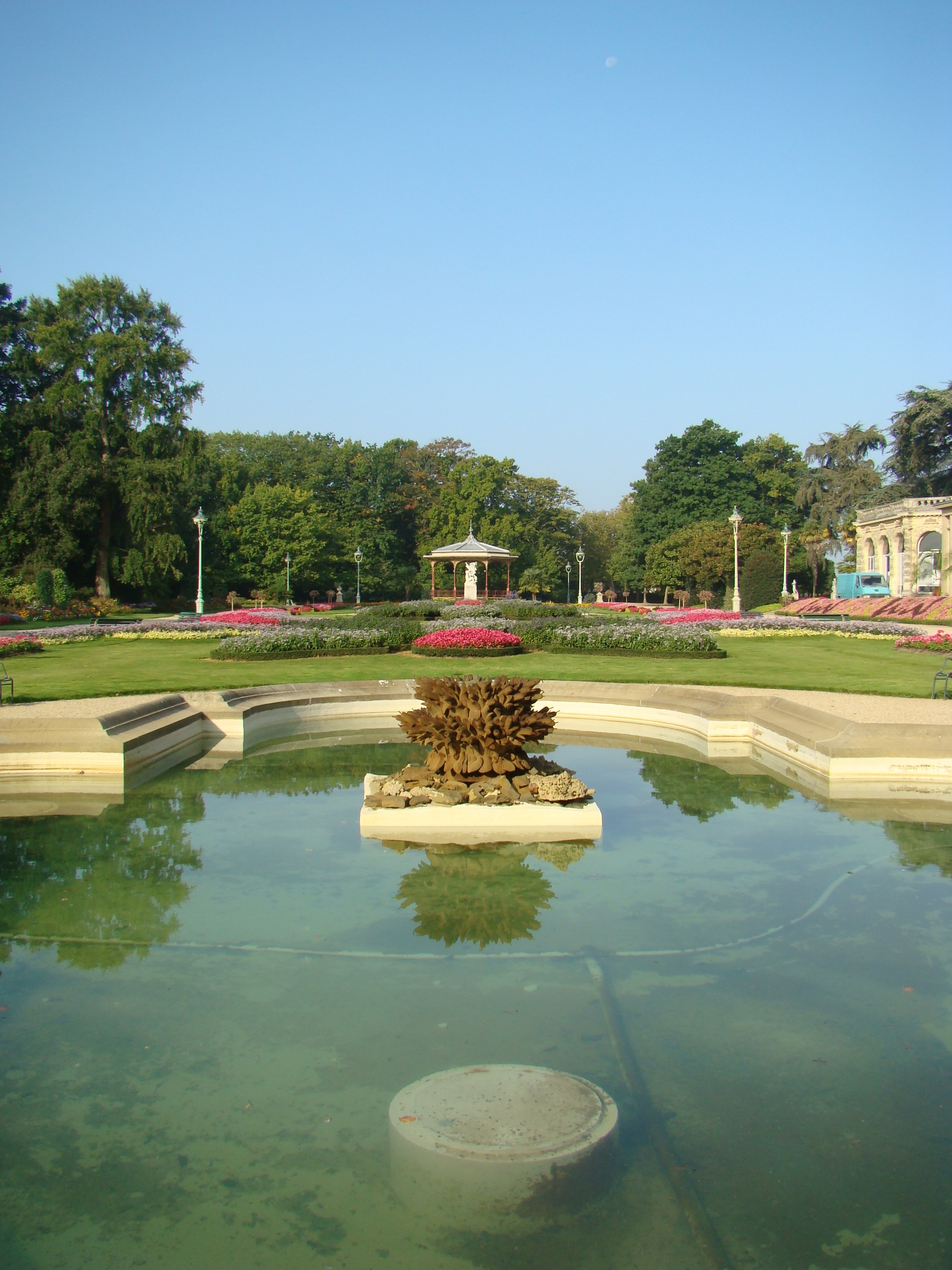
View of a pond and the gazebo in the French garden.

The formal gardens were designed by Denis Bühler at the request of the mayor of the city. This is the only French-style garden created by this landscape architect, and the only 19th century park to have a French-style part.

The geometric figures of the various flower beds are modeled on the greenhouses and orangery designed by Martenot, in order to preserve their harmony.

The French garden respects the precepts of Le Nôtre: there are chapeaux de gendarme, parterres and garden ponds. It is made up of four massifs which are organized symmetrically around two oval-shaped basins. The patterns formed are always round, oval or elliptical in shape, and present a large choice in floral varieties. To the south of the kiosk is a small Italian garden. To keep the original layout intact, only a few technical modifications were undertaken in 1982 with the installation of automatic watering and the setting up of a water recycling system for the ponds.

A cedar of Lebanon, known as the cedar of Jussieu, was previously present on the roundabout in the center of the garden. Legend has it that it was De Jussieu who brought three young plants from Egypt hidden in his hat. He would have offered one to Jardin du Thabor, one to the Jardin des plantes in Paris and the last to the Parc de la Tête d'Or in Lyon. In reality, it was Professor Degland, then director of the botanical garden, who bought six plants in 1830 with his personal funds and one of them was planted in the garden. On March 12, 1967, the cedar of Jussieu was torn by a storm and was replaced by an Atlas cedar.

In addition to the floral park, the French part is also distinguished by its decoration and its enhancement by follies, statues and street furniture. The bandstand, strategically placed in alignment with the massifs of the French garden, on its eastern part, was built by Martenot in 1875.

=== Landscape garden ===
The landscape garden is roughly divided into two areas: first the garden designed by Denis Bühler, offering larger grassed areas and creating openings allowing the creation of picturesque landscapes, then that of the engineer Blin, which is more confined.

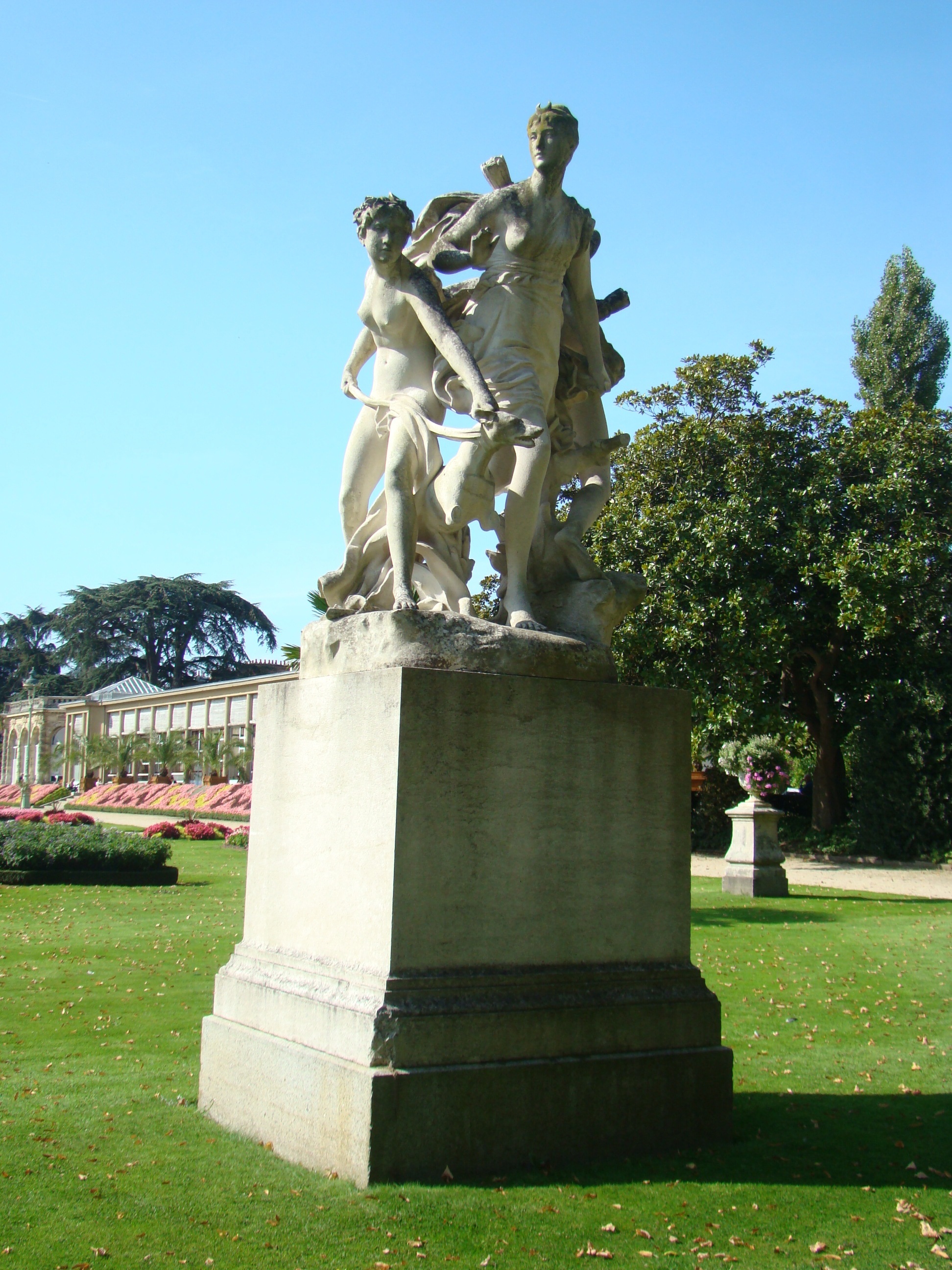
La Chasse de Diane

The aviary imagined by Martenot and located towards the west of the park, in the extension of the French garden, consists of a first circular level of cages for exotic birds surmounted in its central part by a dovecote. A little further south, Charles Joseph Lenoir's third statue, La Chasse de Diane is located, between trees and shrubs.

The landscaped garden is home to many species of trees, and in particular the sequoias. They are found in particular in the Tête d'or park, in the Parc Borély in Marseille and on the Plateau des poètes in Béziers.

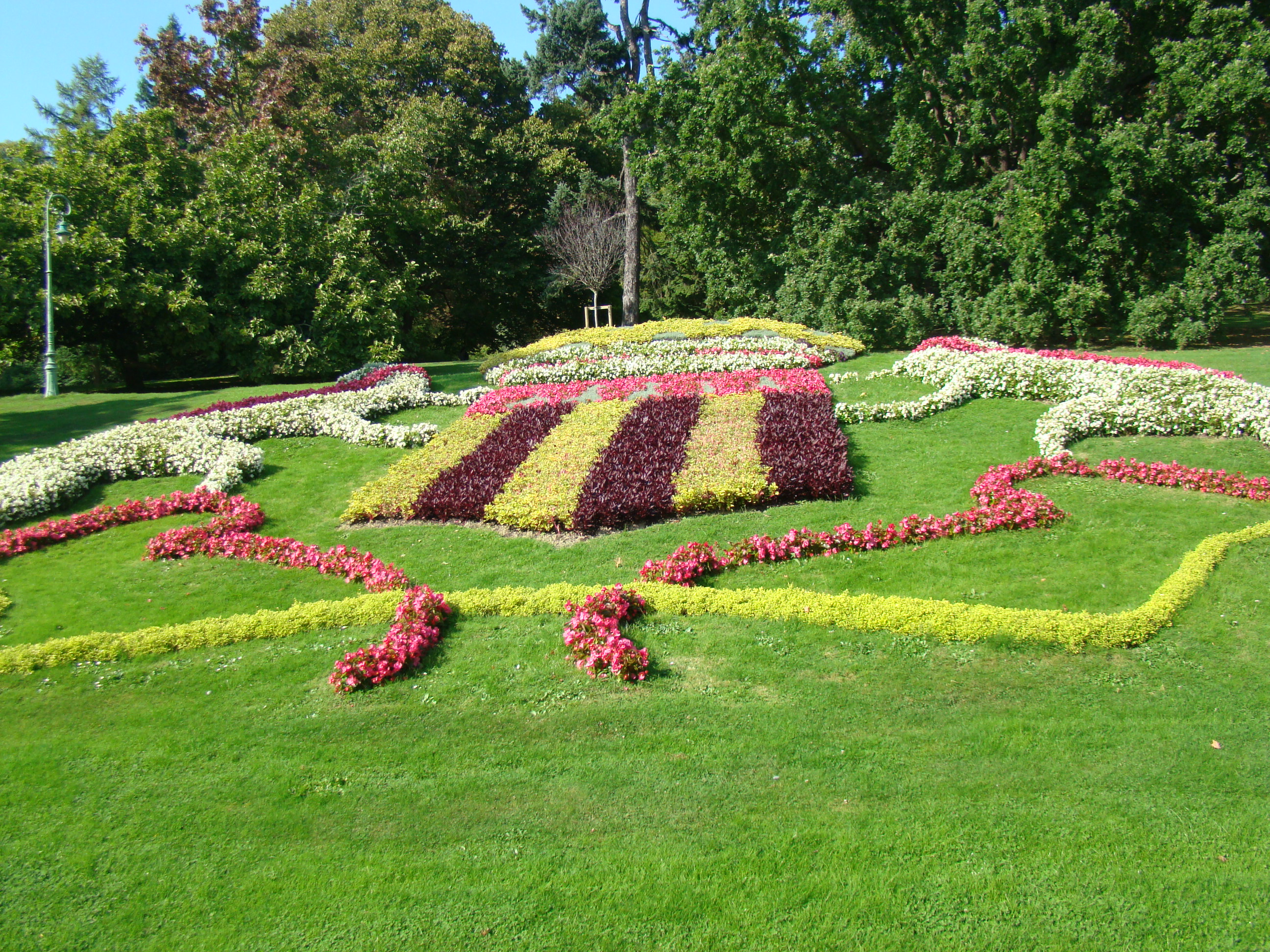
The coat of arms of Rennes.

The most elaborate part of the landscaped park is the mosaic representing the coat of arms of Rennes framed by two ermines. This is the only part of the park enclosure that is largely open to the outside for passers-by and motorists traveling along the rue de Paris.

Few changes were made to Bühler's initial plans. The so-called part of Les Catherinettes was created at the beginning of the 20th century, in particular to satisfy the bourgeoisie of the Square de La Motte district, which demanded an opening onto the Thabor. It stretches from the former landscape garden of the Bühler brothers to the entrance to rue de Paris.

The monumental fountain designed by Charles Millardet in 1829 for the development of the Square de La Motte was dismantled and installed at the entrance to the rue de Paris in 1901. It is a large staircase separated by a landing: in the upper part, it is divided into three parts by stepped fountains and follows a semi-circular plan; in the lower part, the staircase, now straight, is separated into two parts by a large fountain with several basins. The fountain's water supply is provided by the Rennes urban network.

The menagerie was set up in 1930 to the south-east of Les Catherinettes. It originally housed fallow deer, mouflons and a few birds such as ducks and swan geese, but several complaints from the neighborhood, vandalism and also food unsuitable for the species present led to the transformation of the menagerie into a simple enclosure of ducks in 1978.

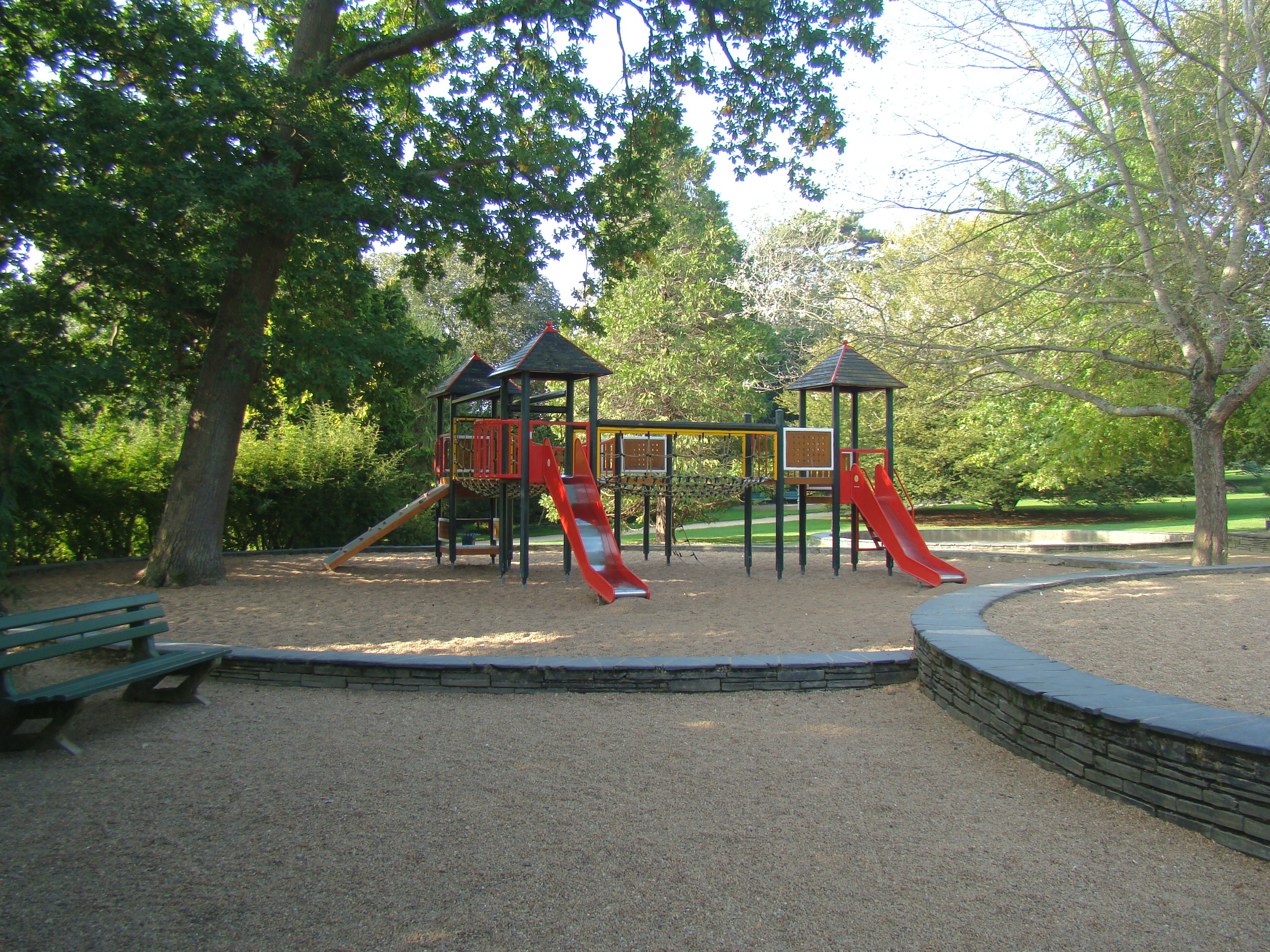
The play area

In 1968, the children's play area was installed to the south-east of the landscape park. It currently contains several slides and swings highlighted by vast circular stone surrounds. A lawn located next to the playground was authorized to the public at the end of the 20th century, unlike the other lawns, which were still prohibited. A diversion of certain paths was carried out in 2010 around the cedar near the menagerie, in order to preserve the roots. A monument in homage to the Breton poet Glenmor decorates the junction between the English garden, L'Enfer and the bowling alley on 27 June 1998.

== Biodiversity ==
=== Animal species ===
There are many birds at the Thabor. Many species of surface ducks and parakeets are on display to the public in the duck enclosure and aviary. Wooden signs representing each bird installed near these installations inform the public of the different species presented.

==== Ducks ====
- Black collared duck
- Cape teal
- Chiloé wigeon
- Northern pintail
- Mandarin duck
- Wood duck
- Rosy-billed pochard
- White-cheeked pintail
- Labrador duck
- Eurasian wigeon

==== Other birds ====
- Atlantic canary
- Diamond dove
- Japanese sparrowhawk
- Zebra finch
- King quail
- Black-cheeked lovebird
- Fischer's lovebird
- Ring-necked parakeet
- Red-rumped parrot
- Budgerigar
- Dove

Apart from very common birds such as magpies, blackbirds and sparrows, the park has several wild birds, passerines and raptors mainly tawny owl and European hawk. The few deer visible in the animal house until the 1980s were moved to Gayeulles Park to make them more comfortable there, leaving their shelter and enclosure for ducks.

In order to protect the park, and in particular the rose garden, from aphids and other harmful insects, the installation of natural predators of these species (ladybirds, hoverflies and lacewings) is encouraged by the installation of refuges for auxiliary insects. The presence of the botanical garden is also very favorable because it also provides shelter for these species.

=== Plant species ===
The park consists of 52,000 square metres (560,000 sq ft) of grass, 5,800 square metres (62,000 sq ft) of shrub beds and 884 trees, including 196 conifers. The park, and in particular the landscaped park, is decorated with many species of trees: sequoias, Lebanese cedar, tricolor beech, tulip trees, cork oak, magnolias, silverbells, etc.

The rose garden blooms in June while the collection of dahlias is shown in August and September. In the fall, the park is adorned with chrysanthemums. In winter and spring, it is especially the biennial plants and bulbous plants that flower the park, accompanied by camellias and rhododendrons.

The botanical garden is home to some rare plant species and protected in France (Spring Adonis, germander shrub, golden garlic, Greek valerian) and Brittany (chives, adénocarpe). The botanical garden is home to 3,120 different plants of which 800 are planted each year; most of which are daisies.

== Cultural space ==
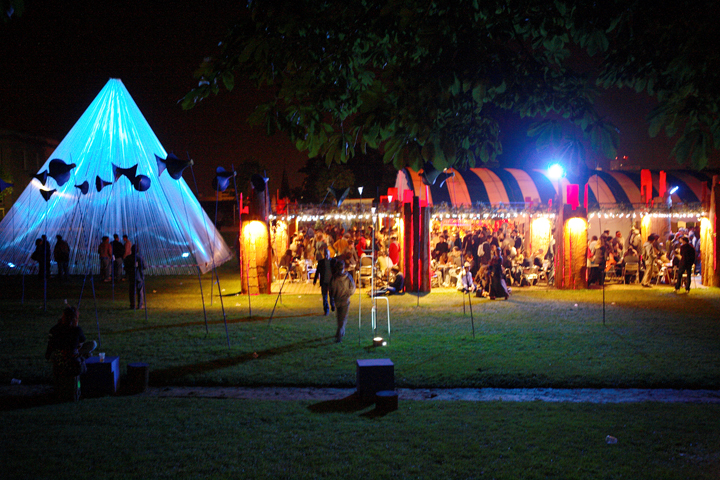
Parc du Thabor during Les Tombées de la nuit in 2007

Parc du Thabor is also used by the city as a meeting point, as during the 1999 solar eclipse when 12,000 people gathered in the event organised by l'Espace des sciences.

The orangery has been a place of exhibition, where various artists have been exhibited like photographs by Yann Derais (pseudonym of photographer Yann Levy) on the theme “Palestine: beyond the wall” in 2004, flip books by Pascal Fouché in 2007, and photographs by Adeline Keil in 2008.

In 2005, as part of a collective exhibition Chantier public #2 organized by the 40mcube art center, the orangery hosted works by the artist duo Daniel Dewar and Grégory Gicquel.

In 2017, it hosted the installation Perspective de escape à l'anglaise by the artist Laurence De Leersnyder, based on a proposal by 40mcube.

The park has also been the location of the Mythos festival since 2008.
