= Jean-Baptiste Martenot =

French architect

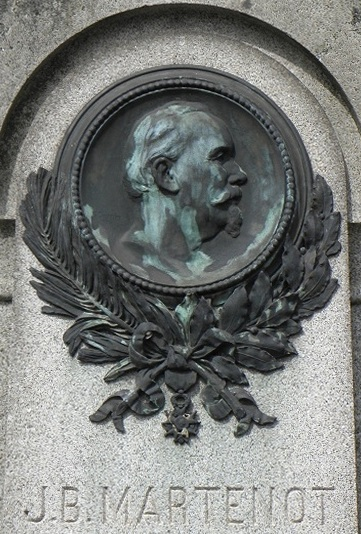
Rennes (35) Cimetière du Nord Tombe J.B. Martenot Détail

Jean-Baptiste Martenot (French: [ʒɑ̃ batist maʁtəno]; Saint-Seine-l'Abbaye Côte-d’Or 26 July 1828 – 30 March 1906 Rennes), was a French architect, born in Bourgogne, in the city of Rennes. The Halles Martenot and the Préfecture Martenot are names in his honour. He is a former student of the école des Beaux-Arts.

From humble beginnings, he obtained a departmental pension to study at the École nationale des Beaux-Arts in Paris, which he attended until 1850. He won the prix Muller Sœhnée.

At 26, Martenot was named inspector of the Palais du Louvre.

In 1858, he was appointed chief architect of the city of Rennes, a post he held until 1895.

== His works ==
- His work in Rennes is important. He built a number of communal buildings, schools, markets, the belfry of the town hall, the chamber of commers, the bank, the buildings of the park, parts of the school of medicine and faculty of sciences, and the church Saint-Aubin-en-Notre-Dame-de-Bonne-Nouvelle, in Place Sainte-Anne (1884–1904).
- He is the one who addressed the general plan for the viability of the municipal canalisation of drinking water.
- The two Lices pavilions were built in 1868 and 1871 in the same style as the old Les Halles by Victor Baltard. The halles de Rennes were rare metal buildings, in a city principally built of wood and stone.
- The collège-lycée Émile-Zola was built in a style combining granite, tufa and brick.
- He also had a number of private clients, in particular, a number of hotels (hôtel Claudet, hôtel Léofanti, hôtel des Nétumières, hôtel de Léon...) and châteaux (château à Plénée-Jugon (attributed, around 1860), château du Breil à Lourmais (1862, château de Bonnefontaine à Antrain, restoration of château de Craffault (1899–1902) and gallery, North pavilion (1902) à Plédran, Côtes-d’Armor). He also built industrial establishments, such as the Imprimerie Oberthür (1870).
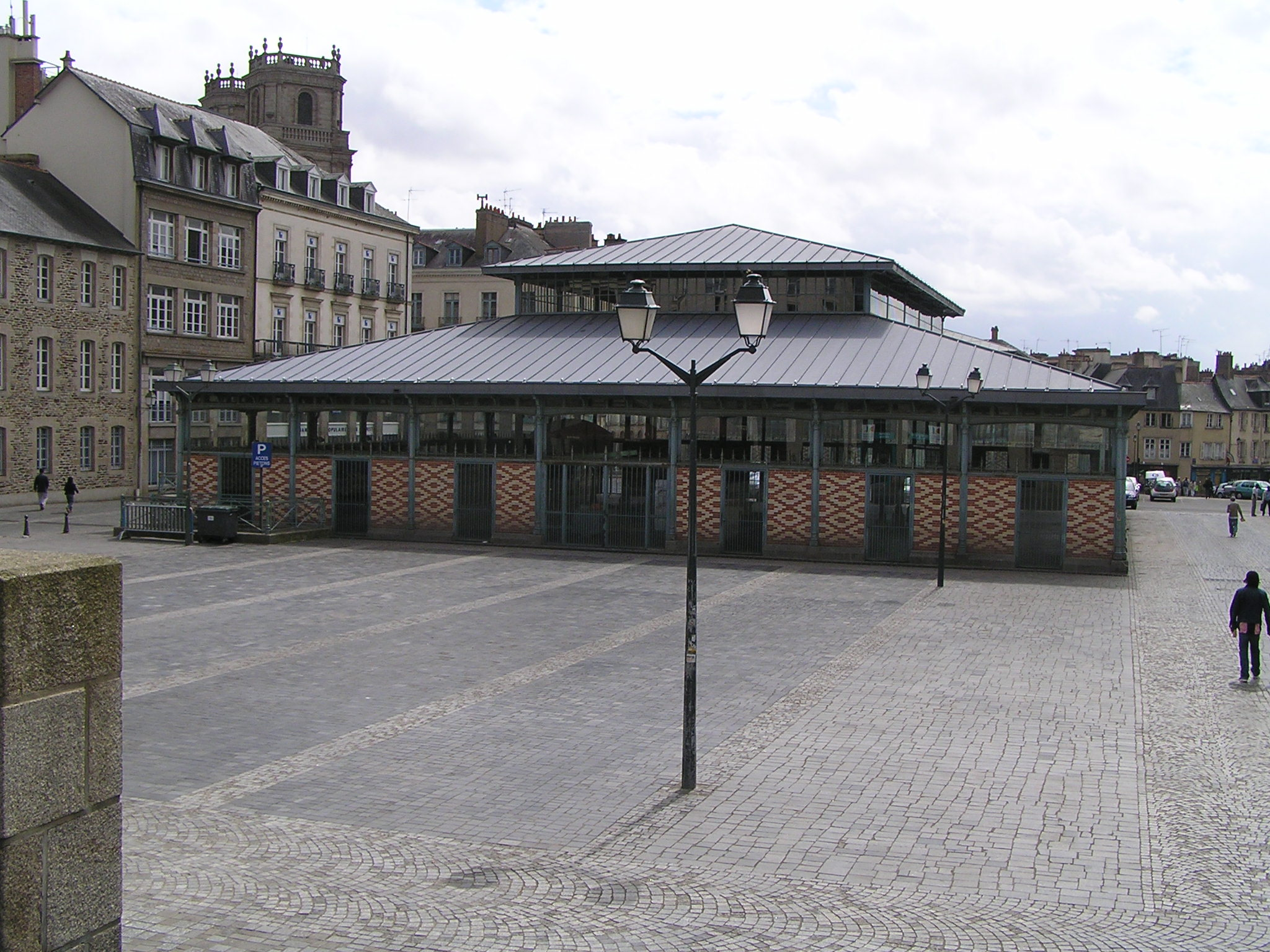
One of the two Lices pavilions "Halles martenot"

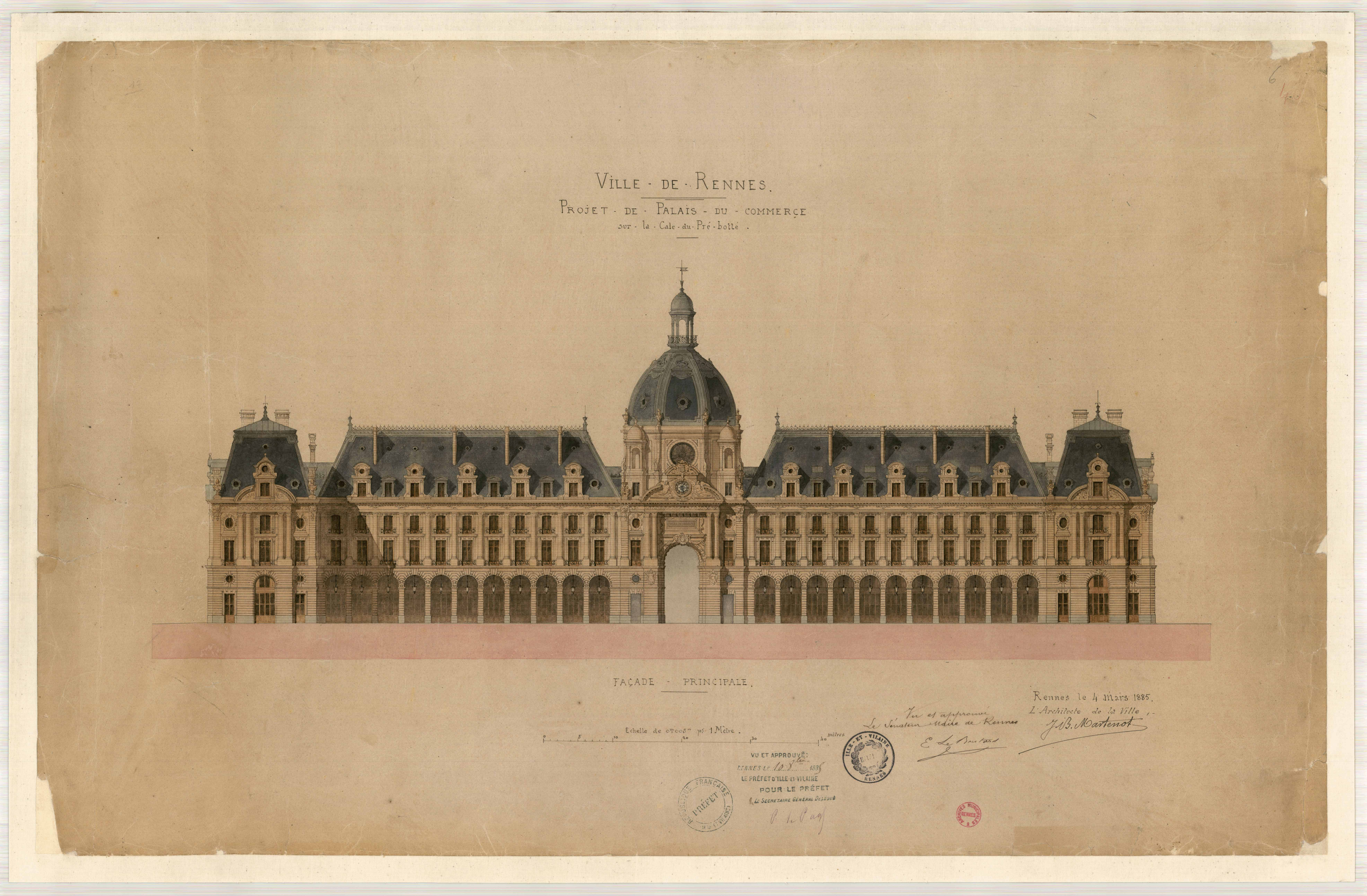
Trade Palace (project)

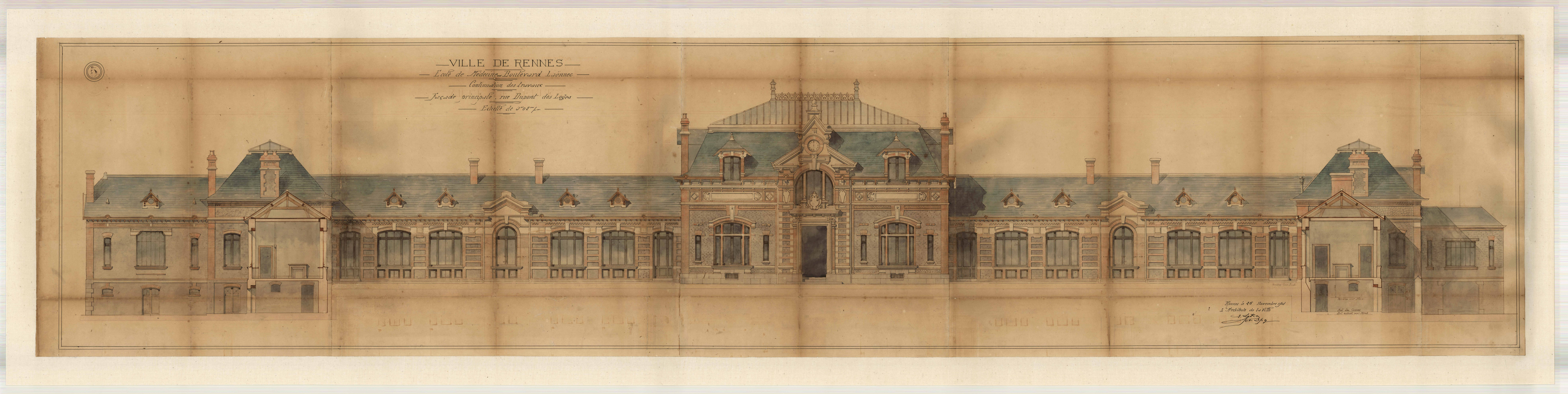
School of Medecine

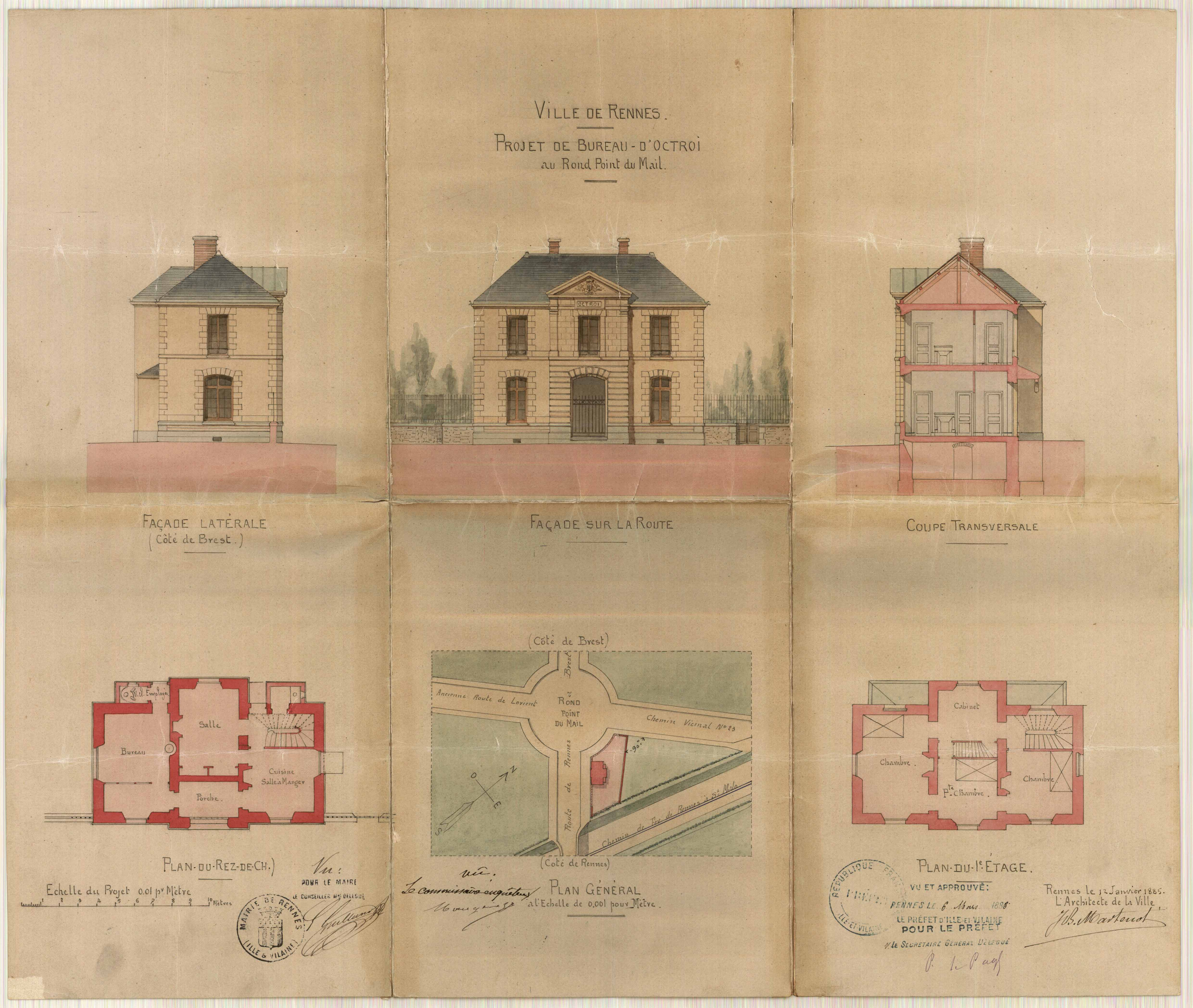
Toll house (project)

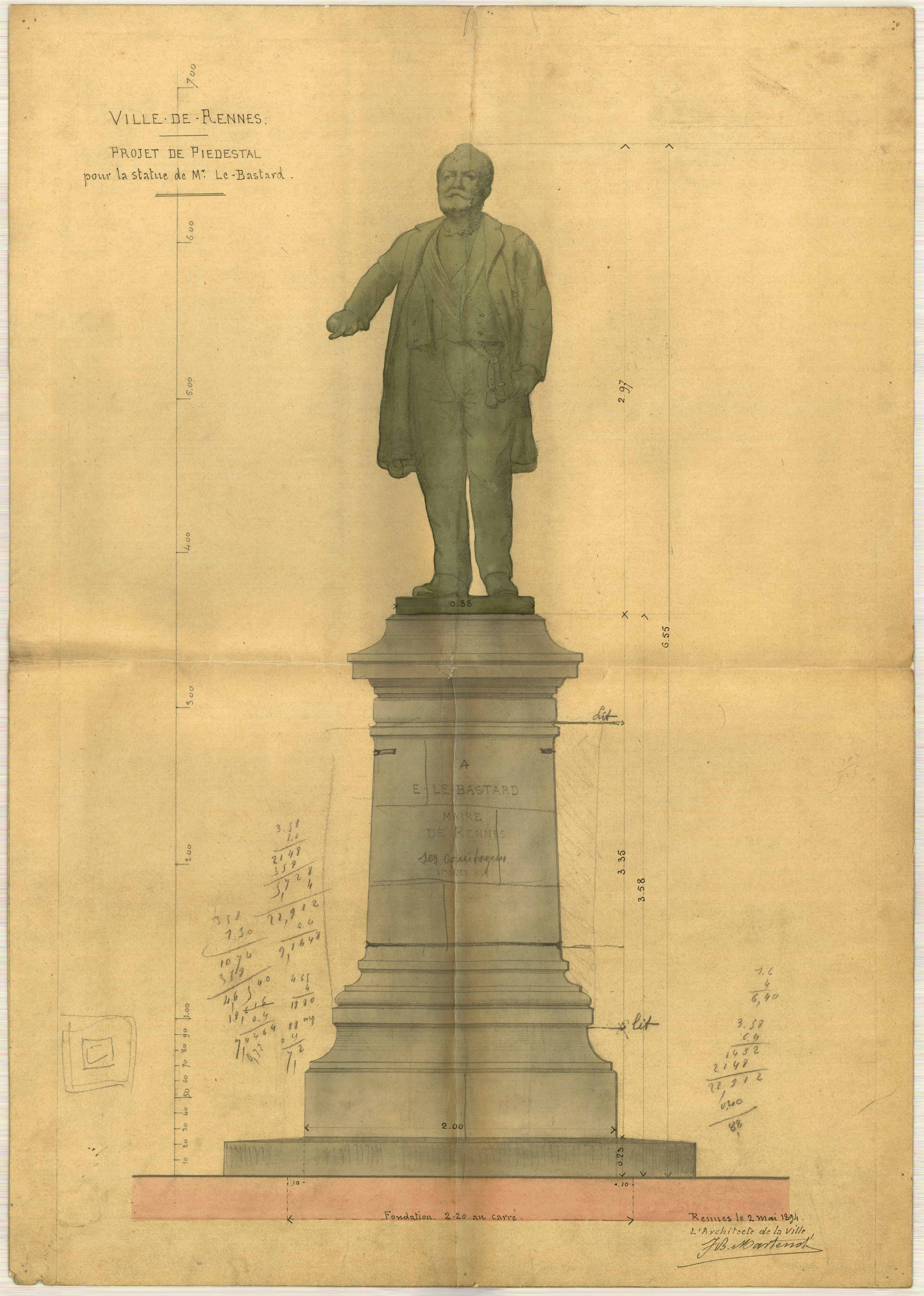
Statute of Edgar Le Bastard's
