= Thomas Jefferson Medal in Architecture =

Architecture award

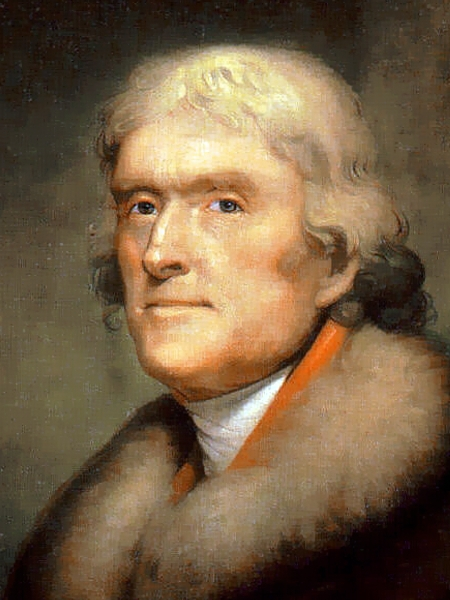
Thomas Jefferson

The Thomas Jefferson Foundation Medal in Architecture recognizes individuals for distinguished contributions to the field of architecture. The Medal in Architecture has been jointly awarded each year by the Thomas Jefferson Foundation at Monticello and the University of Virginia School of Architecture since 1966. Along with the Thomas Jefferson Foundation Medal in Law, the Thomas Jefferson Foundation Medal in Citizen Leadership, and the Thomas Jefferson Medal in Global Innovation, the awards are the highest external honors bestowed by the University, which grants no honorary degrees.

== Recipients ==
| Year | Name | Country |
|---|---|---|
| 1966 | Mies van der Rohe | Chicago, Illinois |
| 1967 | Alvar Aalto | Helsinki, Finland |
| 1968 | Marcel Breuer | New York, New York |
| 1969 | John Ely Burchard | Boston, Massachusetts |
| 1970 | Kenzo Tange | Tokyo, Japan |
| 1971 | Josep Lluis Sert | Barcelona, Catalonia, Spain |
| 1972 | Lewis Mumford | Amenia, New York |
| 1973 | Jean Labatut | Princeton, New Jersey |
| 1974 | Frei Otto | Warmbronn, West Germany |
| 1975 | Sir Nikolaus Pevsner | London, England |
| 1976 | I. M. Pei | New York, New York |
| 1977 | Ada Louise Huxtable | New York, New York |
| 1978 | Philip Johnson | New York, New York |
| 1979 | Lawrence Halprin | San Francisco, California |
| 1980 | Hugh Stubbins | Cambridge, Massachusetts |
| 1981 | Edward Larrabee Barnes | New York, New York |
| 1982 | Vincent J. Scully | New Haven, Connecticut |
| 1983 | Robert Venturi | Philadelphia, Pennsylvania |
| 1984 | H. H. Aga Khan | Gouvieux, France |
| 1985 | Leon Krier | London, England |
| 1986 | James Stirling | London, England |
| 1987 | Dan Kiley | Charlotte, Vermont |
| 1988 | Romaldo Giurgola | New York, New York |
| 1989 | Paul Mellon | Upperville, Virginia |
| 1990 | Fumihiko Maki | Tokyo, Japan |
| 1991 | John V. Lindsay | New York, New York |
| 1992 | Aldo Rossi | Milan, Italy |
| 1993 | Elizabeth Plater-Zyberk and Andres Duany | Miami, Florida |
| 1994 | Frank O. Gehry | Los Angeles, California |
| 1995 | Ian McHarg | Philadelphia, Pennsylvania |
| 1996 | Jane Jacobs | Toronto, Ontario, Canada |
| 1997 | Jaime Lerner | Curitiba, Brazil |
| 1998 | Jaquelin T. Robertson | New York, New York |
| 1999 | Richard Rogers | London, England |
| 2000 | Daniel Patrick Moynihan | New York, New York |
| 2001 | Glenn Murcutt | Sydney, Australia |
| 2002 | James Turrell | Flagstaff, Arizona |
| 2003 | Tod Williams and Billie Tsien | New York, New York |
| 2004 | Peter Walker | Berkeley, California |
| 2005 | Shigeru Ban | Tokyo, Japan |
| 2006 | Peter Zumthor | Haldenstein, Switzerland |
| 2007 | Zaha Hadid | Baghdad, Iraq |
| 2008 | Gro Harlem Brundtland | Oslo, Norway |
| 2009 | Robert Irwin | San Diego, California |
| 2010 | Edward O. Wilson | Cambridge, Massachusetts |
| 2011 | Maya Lin | New York, New York |
| 2012 | Rafael Moneo | Tudela, Navarre, Spain |
| 2013 | Laurie Olin | Philadelphia, Pennsylvania |
| 2014 | Toyo Ito | Tokyo, Japan |
| 2015 | Herman Hertzberger | Amsterdam, Netherlands |
| 2016 | Cecil Balmond | Sri Lanka |
| 2017 | Yvonne Farrell and Shelley McNamara | Republic of Ireland |
| 2018 | Sir David Adjaye | United Kingdom |
| 2019 | Kazuyo Sejima and Ryue Nishizawa | Japan |
| 2020 | Weiss/Manfredi | New York, New York |
| 2021 | Diébédo Francis Kéré | Berlin, Germany |
| 2022 | Kenneth Frampton | New York, New York |
| 2023 | Andrew Freear | Newbern, Alabama |
| 2024 | Kate Orff | New York, New York |
| 2025 | Walter J. Hood | Oakland, California |
