= 1981 in architecture =

List of years in architecture	(table)
- … 1971; 1972; 1973; 1974; 1975; 1976; 1977; 1978; 1979; 1980; 1981; 1982; 1983; 1984; 1985; 1986; 1987; 1988; 1989; 1990; 1991 …
- Buildings and structures: Art; Archaeology; Architecture; Literature; Music; Philosophy; Science; +...

The year 1981 in architecture involved some significant architectural events and new buildings.

== Buildings and structures ==
=== Buildings ===
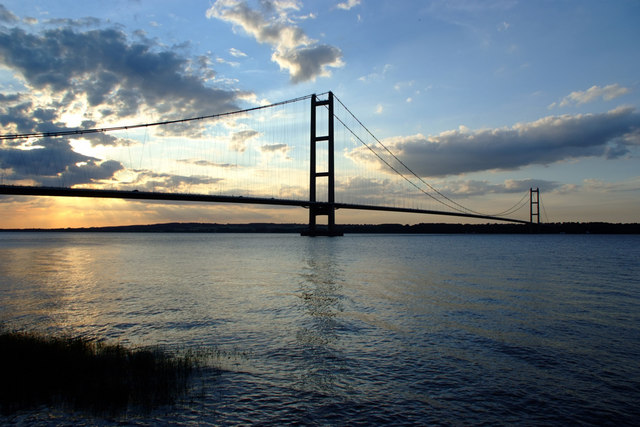
The Humber Bridge in England

- JPMorgan Chase Tower, Houston, Texas designed by I. M. Pei is completed.
- Sydney Tower in Sydney, Australia is completed and opened.
- Colonius in Cologne, Germany is completed.
- Fifth Avenue Place (Calgary) in Calgary, Alberta.
- Sangath in Ahmedabad, India, a studio designed for himself by B. V. Doshi, is completed.
- The Riyadh TV Tower in Riyadh, Saudi Arabia is completed.
- The National Palace of Culture opens in Sofia, Bulgaria.
- Howell High School in Howell, MI is completed as the most expensive high school at the time in the State of Michigan.
- The Marriott World Trade Center originally known as the Vista Hotel, is completed in Lower Manhattan, New York as a part of the World Trade Center complex.
- The Humber Bridge in England, the longest suspension bridge in the world by the length of central span (1981–1998), designed by Freeman Fox & Partners (consulting engineers) and R. E. Slater (architect) is opened to traffic.

== Awards ==
- AIA Gold Medal – Josep Lluís Sert.
- Architecture Firm Award – Hardy Holzman Pfeiffer Associates.
- Grand prix national de l'architecture – Gérard Thurnauer, Pierre Riboulet and Jean-Louis Veret.
- Pritzker Prize – James Stirling.
- RAIA Gold Medal – Colin Madigan.
- RIBA Royal Gold Medal – Philip Dowson.
- Twenty-five Year Award – Farnsworth House.

== Deaths ==
- March 7 – Roy Grounds (born 1905)
- April 10 – Charles Cowles-Voysey (born 1889)
- July 1 – Marcel Breuer (born 1902)
- September 1 – Albert Speer (born 1905)
- December 2 – Wallace Harrison (born 1895)
- date unknown – Kanippayyur Shankaran Namboodiripad, Nambudiri Brahmin and Royal Architect (born 1891)
