= 1996 in architecture =

List of years in architecture	(table)
- … 1986; 1987; 1988; 1989; 1990; 1991; 1992; 1993; 1994; 1995; 1996; 1997; 1998; 1999; 2000; 2001; 2002; 2003; 2004; 2005; 2006 …
- Buildings and structures: Art; Archaeology; Architecture; Literature; Music; Philosophy; Science; +...

The year 1996 in architecture involved some significant architectural events and new buildings.

== Events ==
- June 30 – The historic Sands Hotel on the Las Vegas Strip, designed by architect Wayne McAllister, is demolished.
- date unknown
  - The Stirling Prize is instituted in memory of James Stirling. The first winner is Stephen Hodder for the Centenary Building, University of Salford, Greater Manchester (opened in the same year).
  - Eden Project, Cornwall near St Austell is designed by Nicholas Grimshaw (completed 2001).
  - The Pringle Richards Sharratt partnership is established in London.

== Buildings and structures ==
=== Buildings opened ===
- March 15 – Arken Museum of Modern Art in Copenhagen, designed by Søren Robert Lund.
- May 26 – Hong Kong China Temple, Hong Kong (inaugurated).
- October 3 – Museum Tinguely in Basel, Switzerland, designed by Mario Botta.
- November – Museum für Gegenwart (contemporary art museum) in former Hamburger Bahnhof in Berlin, converted by Josef Paul Kleihues.

=== Buildings completed ===
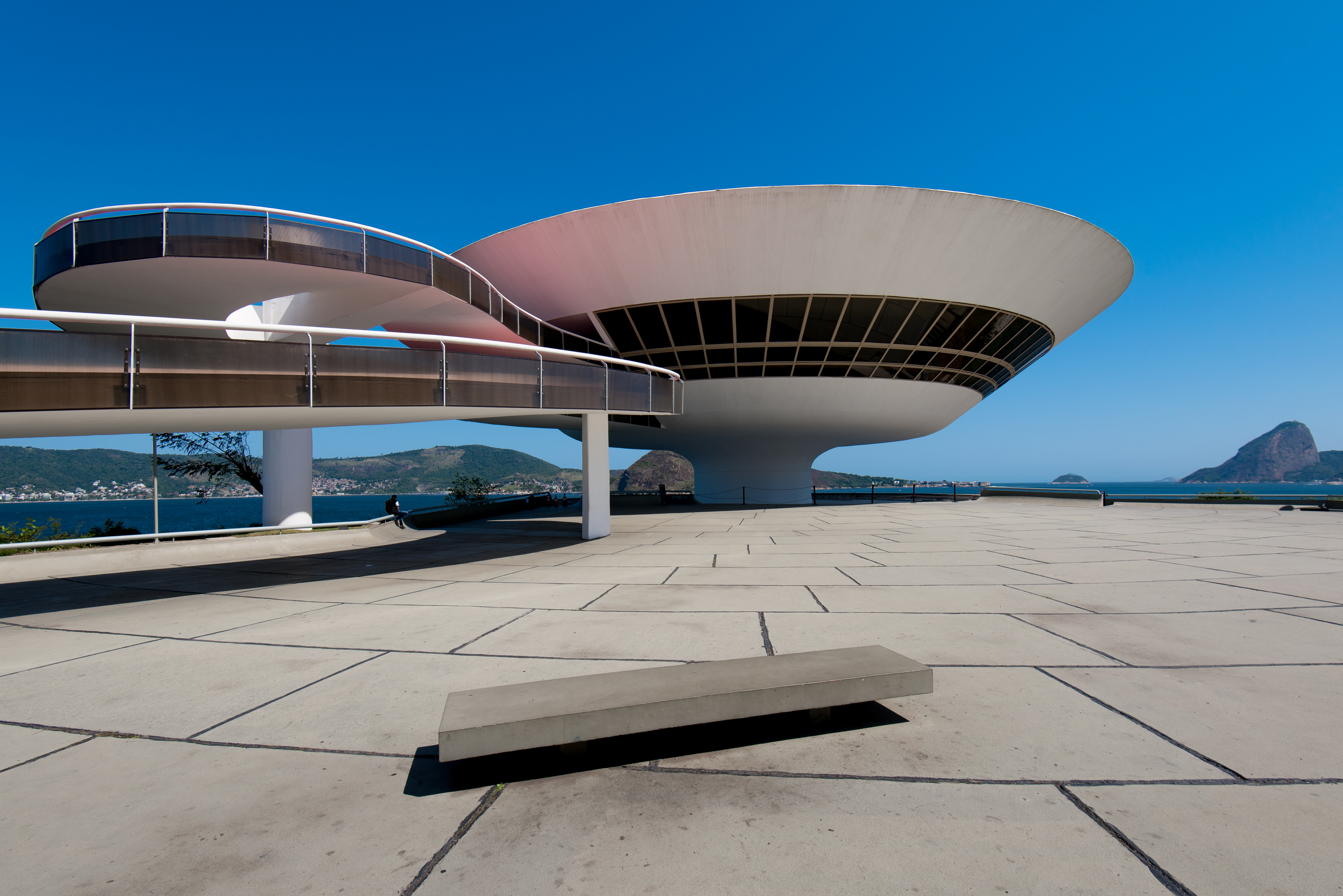
Niterói Contemporary Art Museum, Brazil

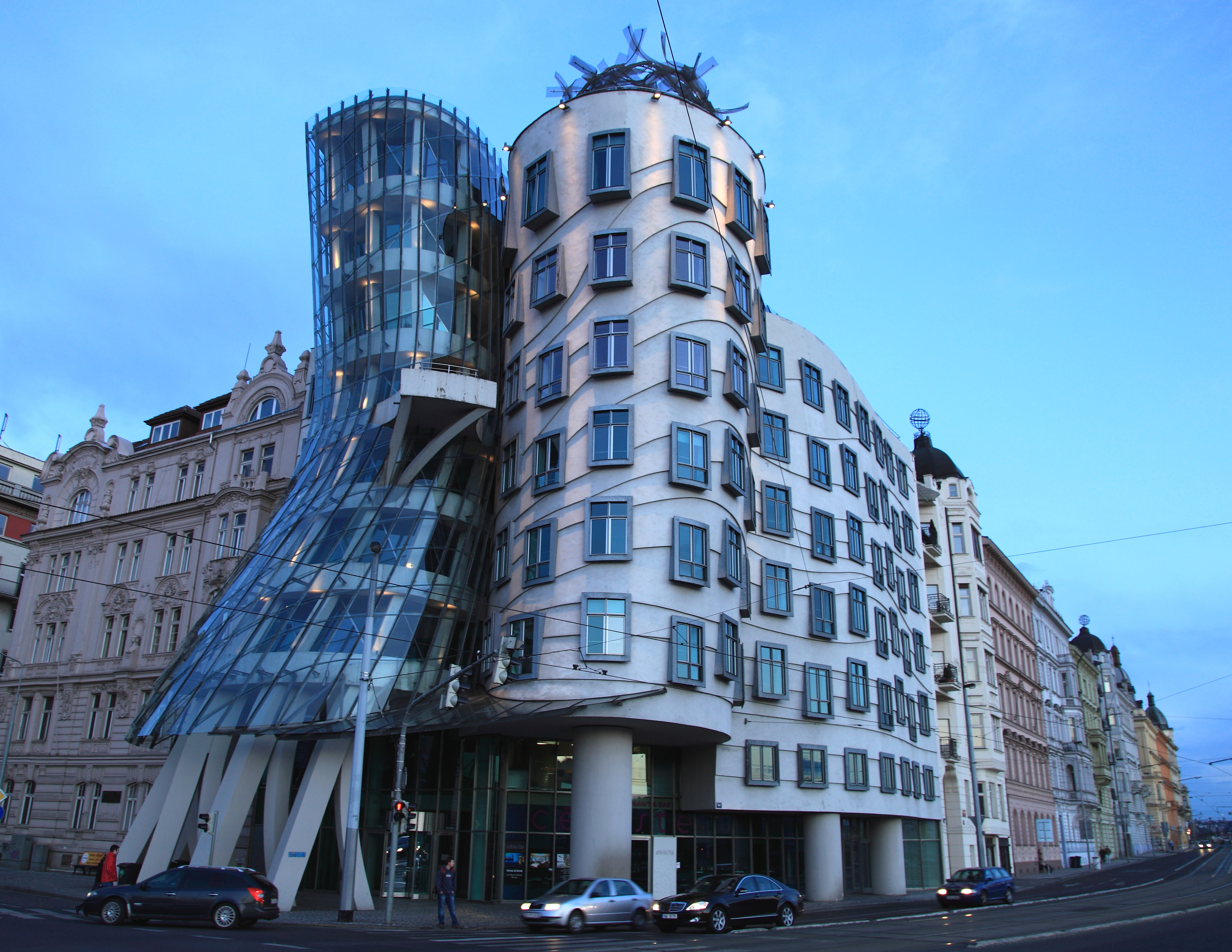
The Dancing House in Prague, Czech Republic

- Niterói Contemporary Art Museum, Brazil, designed by Oscar Niemeyer.
- Eco Building at Horniman Museum, London, designed by Architype.
- Fruit Museum, Yamanashi, Japan, designed by Itsuko Hasegawa.
- Aukrust Centre, Alvdal, Norway, designed by Sverre Fehn.
- Melbourne Convention and Exhibition Centre in Melbourne, Australia, designed by Denton Corker Marshall.
- Shun Hing Square, Shenzhen, designed by K. Y. Cheung Design Associates, the tallest building in Asia until it is surpassed the following year.
- Therme Vals in Switzerland, designed by Peter Zumthor.
- The Dancing House (Nationale-Nederlanden building) in Prague, designed by Vlado Milunić with Frank Gehry.
- Maggie's Centre, Edinburgh, a drop-in cancer care centre; building conversion by Richard Murphy.
- Orphanage (first stage), Chhebetor, Nepal, designed by Hans Olav Hesseberg and Sixten Rahiff of Bergen School of Architecture.
- 81 Mill Street, Osney, Oxford, England, a house designed for himself by Adrian James.

== Awards ==
- American Academy of Arts and Letters Gold Medal – Philip Johnson
- Architecture Firm Award – Skidmore, Owings & Merrill LLP
- European Union Prize for Contemporary Architecture (Mies van der Rohe Prize) – Dominique Perrault for Bibliothèque Nationale de France
- Grand prix national de l'architecture – Bernard Tschumi
- Praemium Imperiale Architecture Laureate – Tadao Ando
- Pritzker Prize – Rafael Moneo
- Prix de l'Équerre d'Argent – Pierre-Louis Faloci
- RAIA Gold Medal – Denton Corker Marshall
- RIBA Royal Gold Medal – Harry Seidler
- Stirling Prize – Stephen Hodder for Centenary Building, University of Salford
- Thomas Jefferson Medal in Architecture – Jane Jacobs
- Twenty-five Year Award – United States Air Force Academy Cadet Chapel
- UIA Gold Medal – Rafael Moneo

== Deaths ==
- February 14 – Alejandro de la Sota, Spanish architect (born 1913)
- May 19 – Roy Mason, American lecturer, writer and futuristic architect (born 1938)
- July 17 – Sir Geoffrey Jellicoe, English landscape architect (born 1900)
- July 27 – Dame Jane Drew, English modernist architect and town planner (born 1911)
- November 23 – Ralph Tubbs, British architect, designer of the Dome of Discovery at the Festival of Britain (born 1912)
