= 1990 in architecture =

List of years in architecture	(table)
- … 1980; 1981; 1982; 1983; 1984; 1985; 1986; 1987; 1988; 1989; 1990; 1991; 1992; 1993; 1994; 1995; 1996; 1997; 1998; 1999; 2000 …
- Buildings and structures: Art; Archaeology; Architecture; Literature; Music; Philosophy; Science; +...

The year 1990 in architecture involved some significant architectural events and new buildings.

== Events ==
- Caruso St John architectural practice established in the U.K. by Adam Caruso and Peter St John.

== Buildings and structures ==
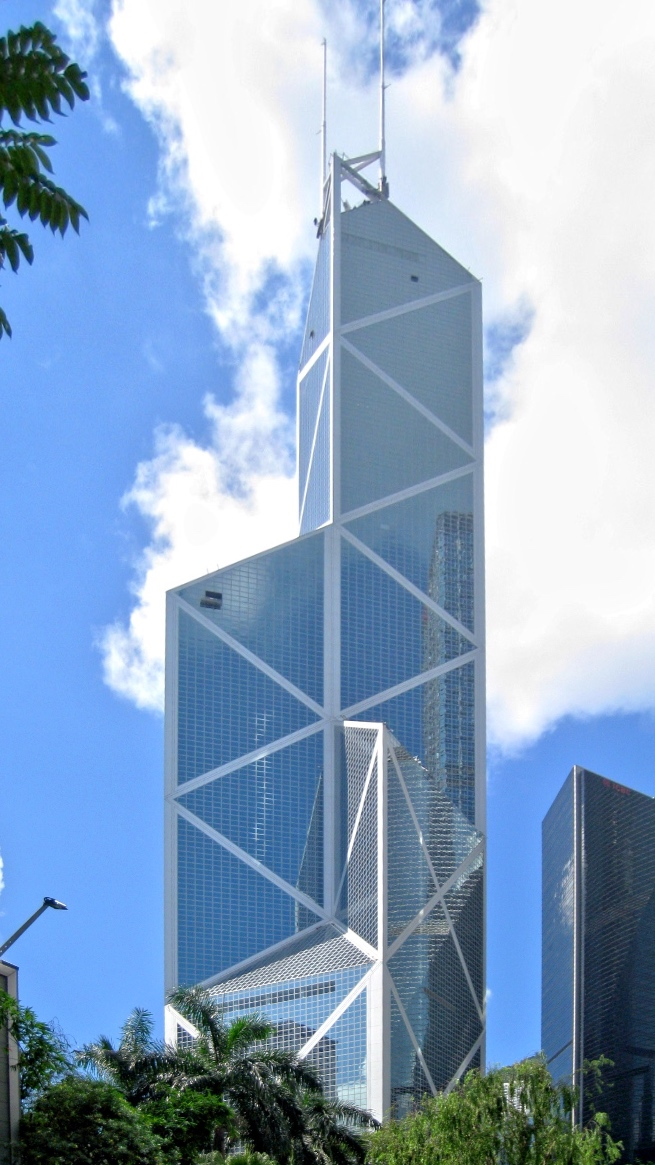
Bank of China Tower (Hong Kong)

- Atatürk Dam in Turkey is completed
- Scotia Tower (Montreal) in Montreal, Canada
- Bank of China Tower, Hong Kong, designed by I. M. Pei, is completed and becomes the tallest building in the British Commonwealth (1990-1992).
- Messeturm in Frankfurt, is completed and becomes the tallest building in the European Union (1990-1997).
- U.S. Bank Tower in Los Angeles, designed by architectural firm Pei Cobb Freed & Partners, is completed.
- Two Prudential Plaza in Chicago is completed.
- Scripps Center in Cincinnati is completed.
- Basilica of Our Lady of Peace of Yamoussoukro in Ivory Coast, designed by Pierre Fakhoury, is consecrated as one of the world's largest churches.
- The Round Building at Hathersage in the Peak District of England, for David Mellor (cutler), designed by Michael Hopkins, is built.
- Construction of the Washington National Cathedral is completed.

== Awards ==
- American Academy of Arts and Letters Gold Medal – Kevin Roche.
- AIA Gold Medal – E. Fay Jones.
- Architecture Firm Award – Kohn Pedersen Fox Associates.
- European Union Prize for Contemporary Architecture (Mies van der Rohe Prize) – Sir Norman Foster for New Stansted Airport Terminal, London.
- Grand Prix de l'urbanisme – Jean-François Revert.
- Grand Prix national de l'architecture – Francis Soler.
- Praemium Imperiale Architecture Laureate – James Stirling.
- Pritzker Prize – Aldo Rossi.
- RAIA Gold Medal – Peter McIntyre.
- RIBA Royal Gold Medal – Aldo van Eyck.
- Twenty-five Year Award – Gateway Arch.
- UIA Gold Medal – Charles Correa.

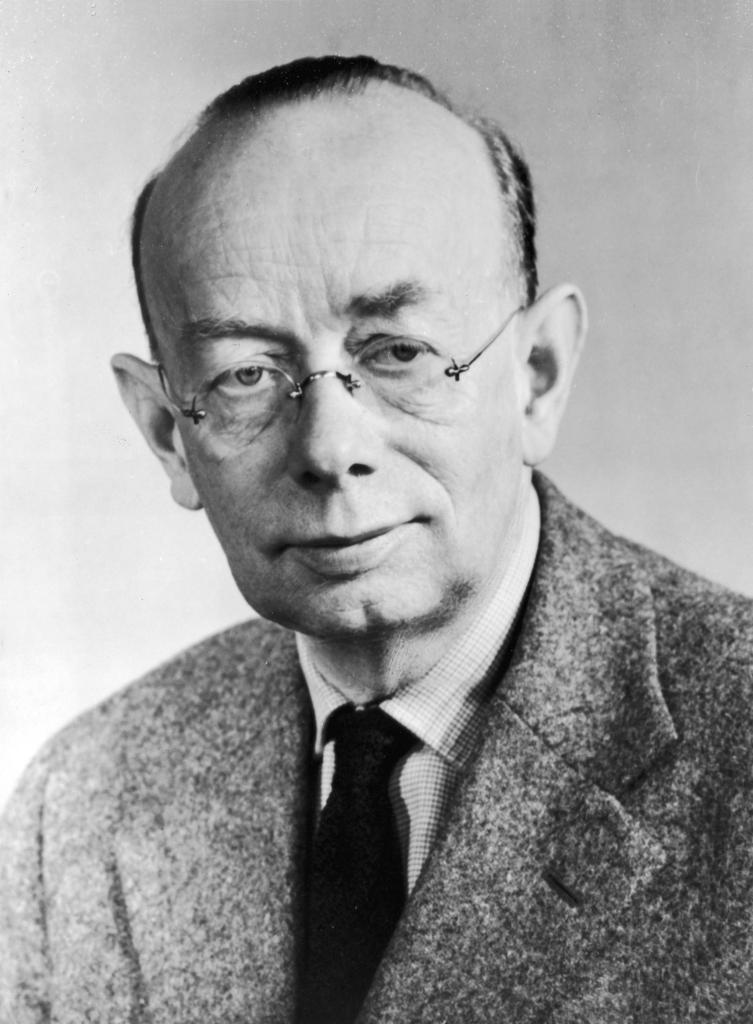
Steen Eiler Rasmussen

== Deaths ==
- April 20 – Arnold Alas, Estonian soldier and architect (born 1911)
- August 6 – Gordon Bunshaft, American architect (born 1909)
- June 19 – Steen Eiler Rasmussen, Danish architect (born 1898)
- December 24 – Judith Ledeboer, Dutch-born English architect (born 1901)
- December 31 – Giovanni Michelucci, Italian architect (born 1891)
