= 1994 in architecture =

List of years in architecture	(table)
- … 1984; 1985; 1986; 1987; 1988; 1989; 1990; 1991; 1992; 1993; 1994; 1995; 1996; 1997; 1998; 1999; 2000; 2001; 2002; 2003; 2004 …
- Buildings and structures: Art; Archaeology; Architecture; Literature; Music; Philosophy; Science; +...

The year 1994 in architecture involved some significant architectural events and new buildings.

== Events ==
- The Maupoleum in Amsterdam is demolished.

== Buildings and structures ==
=== Buildings opened ===
- May 6 – The Channel Tunnel connecting Britain and France is opened.
- September 4 – Kansai International Airport in Osaka, Japan, designed by Renzo Piano, opens with its Terminal 1 as the longest building in the world.
- date unknown – Channel 4 Building, home of the Channel 4 television company, designed by the Richard Rogers Partnership, opened on Horseferry Road in Westminster, London.

=== Buildings completed ===
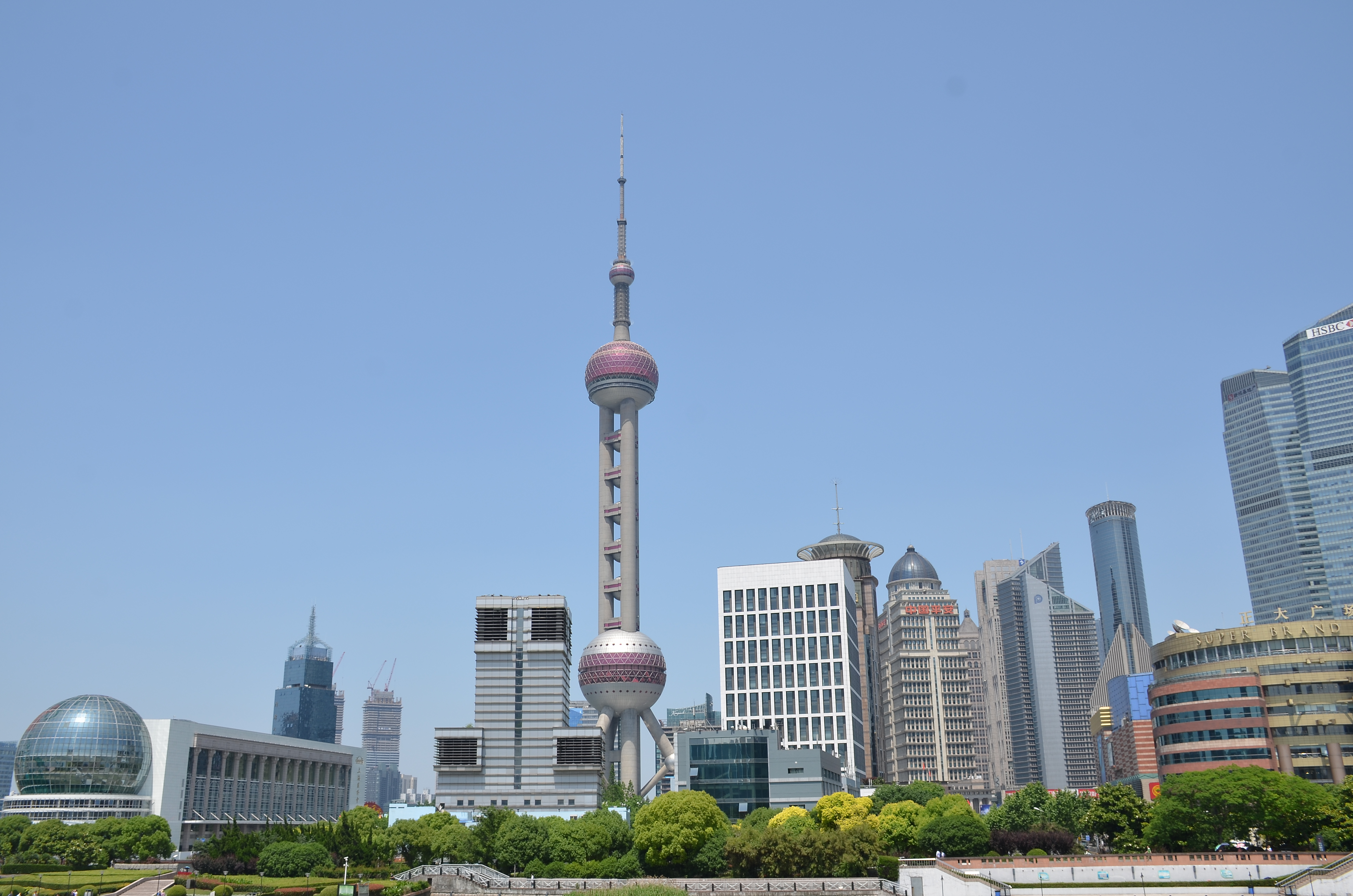
The Oriental Pearl Tower in Shanghai, China

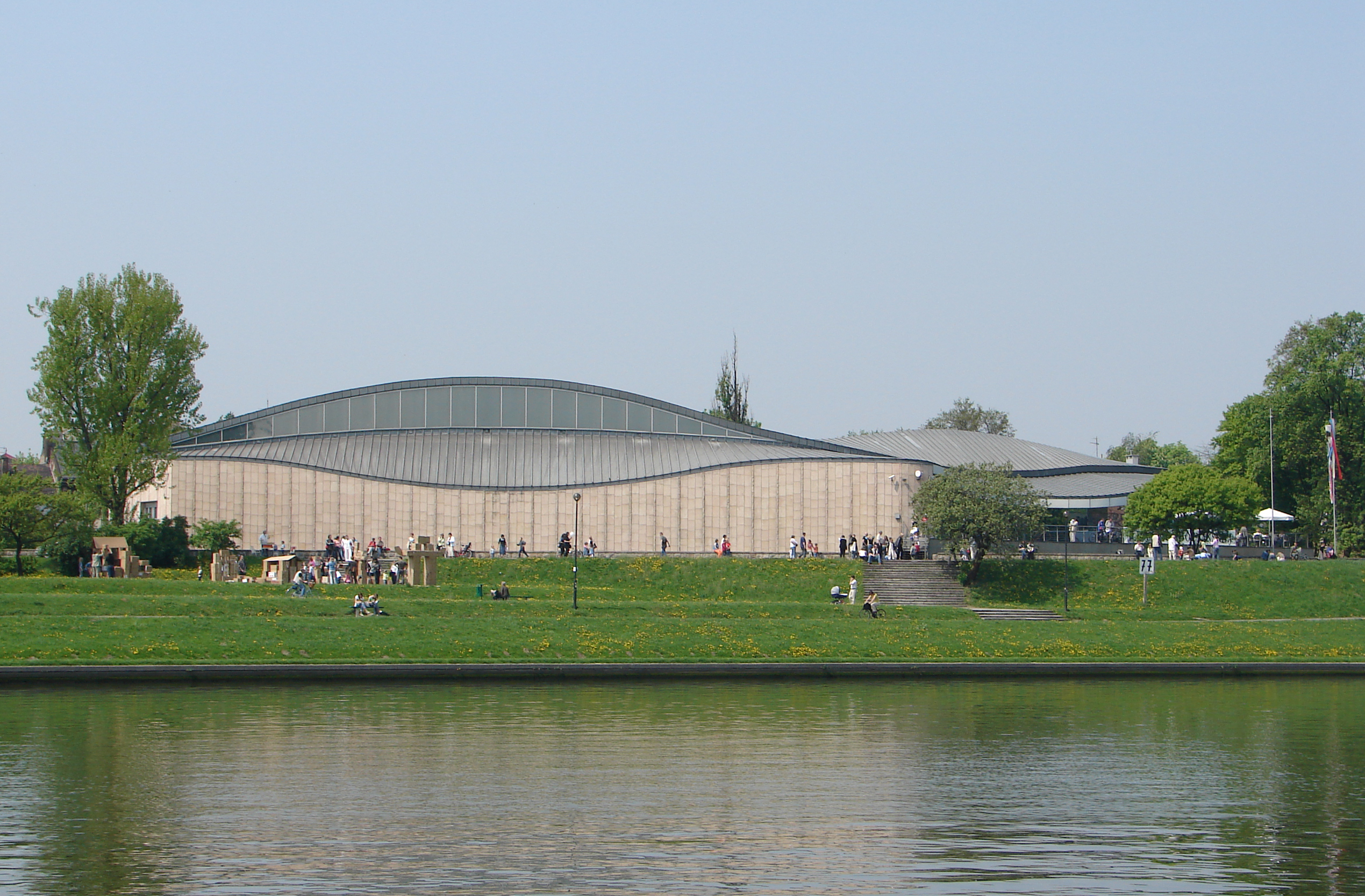
The Manggha in Kraków, Poland

- Oriental Pearl Tower, Shanghai, China.
- Shinjuku Park Tower, in the Shinjuku district of Tokyo, Japan.
- Kamiichi Mountain Pavilion, Japan, designed by Peter Salter.
- World Trade Center México, Mexico City, Mexico.
- Qingdao TV Tower, Qingdao, China.
- International Saddam Tower, Baghdad, Iraq.
- Igualada Cemetery, Catalonia, designed by Enric Miralles and Carme Pinós.
- Pirkkala Church, Finland, designed by Käpy and Simo Paavilainen.
- Garden Quadrangle, St John's College, Oxford, England, designed by MacCormac Jamieson Prichard.
- Hauer-King House, Canonbury, London, designed by Future Systems.
- Manggha, Kraków, Poland, by Arata Isozaki.

== Awards ==
- AIA Gold Medal – Norman Foster.
- Architecture Firm Award – Bohlin Cywinski Jackson.
- European Union Prize for Contemporary Architecture (Mies van der Rohe Prize) – Nicholas Grimshaw & Partners for Waterloo International railway station, London.
- Praemium Imperiale Architecture Laureate – Charles Correa.
- Pritzker Prize – Christian de Portzamparc.
- Prix de l'Équerre d'Argent – Henri and Bruno Gaudin.
- RAIA Gold Medal – Neville Quarry.
- RIBA Royal Gold Medal – Michael and Patricia Hopkins.
- Thomas Jefferson Medal in Architecture – Frank O. Gehry.
- Twenty-five Year Award – Haystack Mountain School of Crafts

== Deaths ==
- February 14 – Pietro Belluschi, Italian-born American architect (born 1899)
- August 11 – Gordon Cullen, English architect and urban designer associated with the "Townscape" movement (born 1914)
- August 19 – Nancy Lancaster, American-born interior decorator associated with the English country house look (born 1897)
- October 24 – John Lautner, American architect (born 1911)
- November 11 – Stephen Dykes Bower, English ecclesiastical architect (born 1903)
- December 10 – Henry Bernard, French architect, designer of the Palace of Europe (born 1912)
