= 1984 in architecture =

List of years in architecture	(table)
- … 1974; 1975; 1976; 1977; 1978; 1979; 1980; 1981; 1982; 1983; 1984; 1985; 1986; 1987; 1988; 1989; 1990; 1991; 1992; 1993; 1994 …
- Buildings and structures: Art; Archaeology; Architecture; Literature; Music; Philosophy; Science; +...

The year 1984 in architecture involved some significant architectural events and new buildings.

== Events ==
- May 30 – The Prince of Wales (now Charles III), in a speech to the Royal Institute of British Architects denounces the proposed modernist Hampton Extension to the National Gallery in London designed by Peter Ahrends as "a hideous carbuncle on the face of an elegant and much-loved friend", declaring his reactionary views on architecture for the first time.
- KieranTimberlake architecture firm established in Philadelphia.

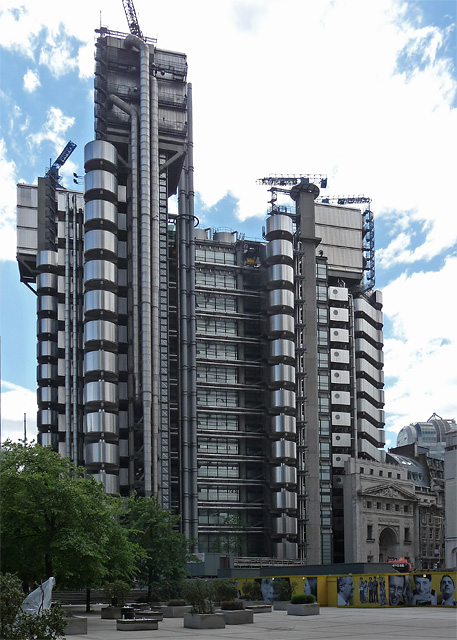
Lloyd's building

== Buildings and structures ==
=== Buildings opened ===
- April 11 – PPG Place in Pittsburgh, Pennsylvania, United States.
- May 5 – Dayabumi Complex, Kuala Lumpur, Malaysia.
- July 20 – Kielce Bus Station, Poland, designed by Edward Modrzejewski.
- August 8 – Kylesku Bridge, Scotland, UK.
- November 18 – Lloyd's building in London, designed by Richard Rogers.
- December 1 – Oxford Ice Rink in England, designed by Nicholas Grimshaw & Partners with Ove Arup & Partners.
- Neue Staatsgalerie in Stuttgart, designed by James Stirling.
- Old Stone Square in Providence, Rhode Island, designed by Edward Larrabee Barnes
- Theatres Building at the Arts Centre Melbourne, Australia.

=== Buildings completed ===
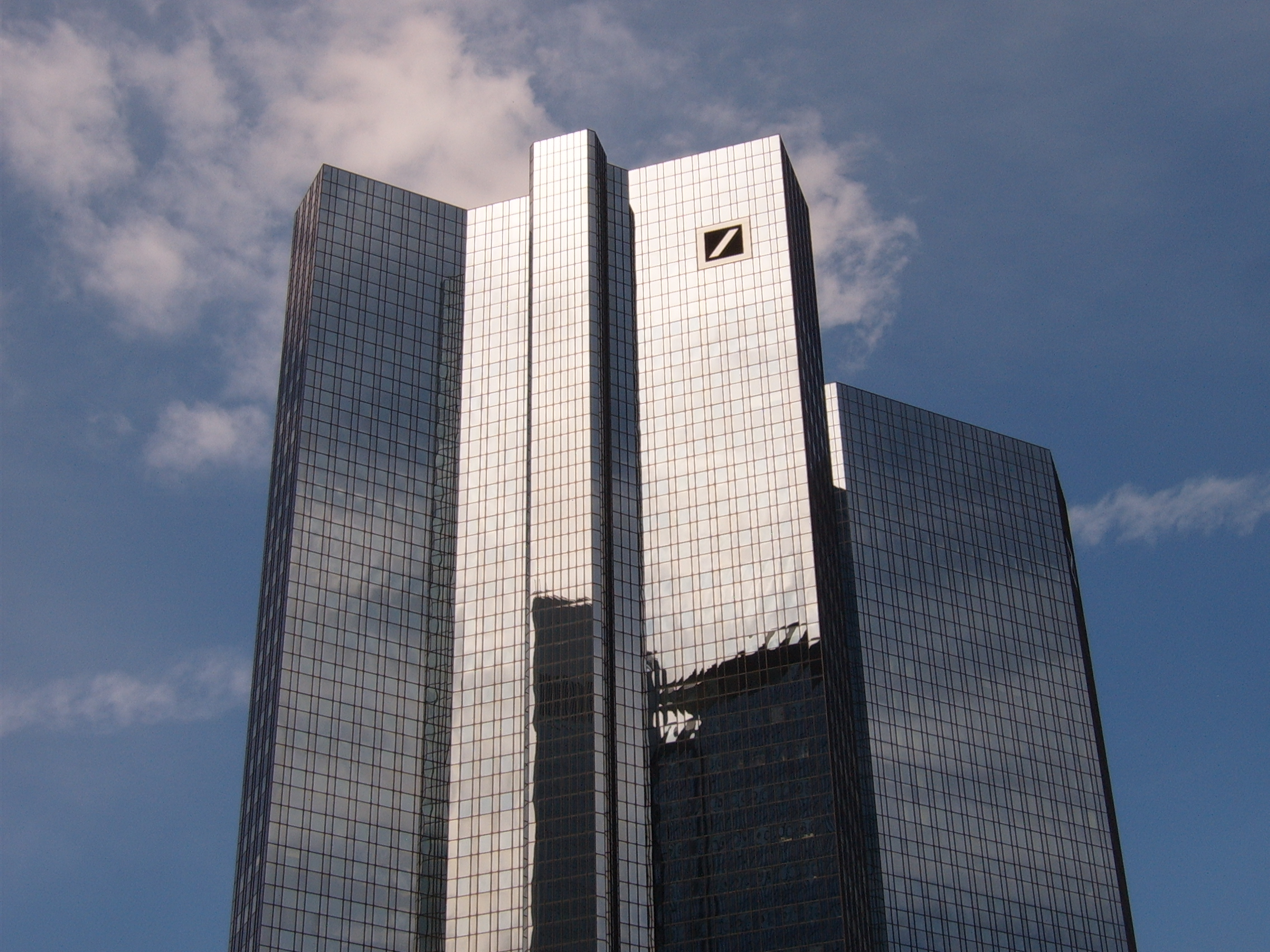
Deutsche Bank Twin Towers in Frankfurt am Main, Germany

- Myyrmäki Church, Vantaa, Finland, designed by Juha Leiviskä.
- Deutsche Bank Twin Towers, Frankfurt am Main, Germany.
- Smurfit-Stone Building in Chicago, Illinois, United States.
- Swisscom-Sendeturm St. Chrischona, near Basel, Switzerland.
- Southeast Financial Center, Miami, Florida, United States.
- Target House, London, designed by Rodney Gordon.
- Tour Hertzienne TDF in Romainville near Paris, France.
- Suncor Energy Centre in Calgary, Alberta

== Awards ==
- American Academy of Arts and Letters Gold Medal – Gordon Bunshaft
- Architecture Firm Award – Kallmann McKinnell & Wood Architects.
- Grand prix national de l'architecture – Edmond Lay.
- Pritzker Prize – Richard Meier.
- RAIA Gold Medal – Philip Cox.
- RIBA Royal Gold Medal – Charles Correa.
- Twenty-five Year Award – Seagram Building.
- UIA Gold Medal – Hassan Fathy.

== Deaths ==
- January 9 – Frederick Gibberd, English architect (born 1908)
- May 19 – John Betjeman, English architectural writer and poet (born 1906)
- July 24 – Arieh Sharon, Israeli architect (born 1900)
- December 22 – Vilhelm Lauritzen, Danish modernist architect (born 1894)
