= Grand prix national de l'architecture =

French architecture prize

The Grand prix national de l'architecture ("Grand National Prize of Architecture") is a French prize awarded by a jury of twenty persons under the chairmanship of the Ministry of Culture to an architect, or an architectural firm, for recognition of an outstanding contribution to architecture. Established in 1975 and relaunched in 2004, it is the highest French award in architecture.

== Winners ==
The prize has been awarded to:

- 1975 - Jean Willerval
- 1976 - Roger Taillibert
- 1977 - Paul Andreu; Roland Simounet
- 1978 - Jean Renaudie
- 1979 - Claude Parent
- 1980 - Paul Chemetov
- 1981 - Atelier de Montrouge (Gérard Thurnauer, Pierre Riboulet and Jean-Louis Véret)
- 1982 - Claude Vasconi
- 1983 - Henri Ciriani
- 1984 - Edmond Lay
- 1985 - Michel Andrault and Pierre Parat
- 1986 - Adrien Fainsilber
- 1987 - Jean Nouvel
- 1988 - (not awarded)
- 1989 - André Wogenscky; Henri Gaudin (prize refused by the winner)
- 1990 - Francis Soler
- 1991 - Christian Hauvette
- 1992 - Christian de Portzamparc
- 1993 - Dominique Perrault
- 1994 - (not awarded)
- 1995 - (not awarded)
- 1996 - Bernard Tschumi
- 1997 - (not awarded)
- 1998 - Jacques Hondelatte
- 1999 - Massimiliano Fuksas
- 2000 - (not awarded)
- 2001 - (not awarded)
- 2002 - (not awarded)
- 2003 - (not awarded)
- 2004 - Patrick Berger
- 2005 - (not awarded)
- 2006 - Rudy Ricciotti
- 2008 - Anne Lacaton and Jean-Philippe Vassal
- 2010 - Frédéric Borel
- 2011 - (not awarded)
- 2012 - (not awarded)
- 2013 - Marc Barani
- 2014 - (not awarded)
- 2015 - (not awarded)
- 2016 - Jean-Marc Ibos and Myrto Vitar
- 2018 - Pierre-Louis Faloci
- 2022 - Atelier d'Architecture Philippe Prost (Philippe Prost, Gaël Lesterlin, Lucas Monsaingeon and Catherine Seyler )
