= 1983 in architecture =

List of years in architecture	(table)
- … 1973; 1974; 1975; 1976; 1977; 1978; 1979; 1980; 1981; 1982; 1983; 1984; 1985; 1986; 1987; 1988; 1989; 1990; 1991; 1992; 1993 …
- Buildings and structures: Art; Archaeology; Architecture; Literature; Music; Philosophy; Science; +...

The year 1983 in architecture involved some significant architectural events and new buildings.

== Buildings and structures ==
=== Buildings opened ===
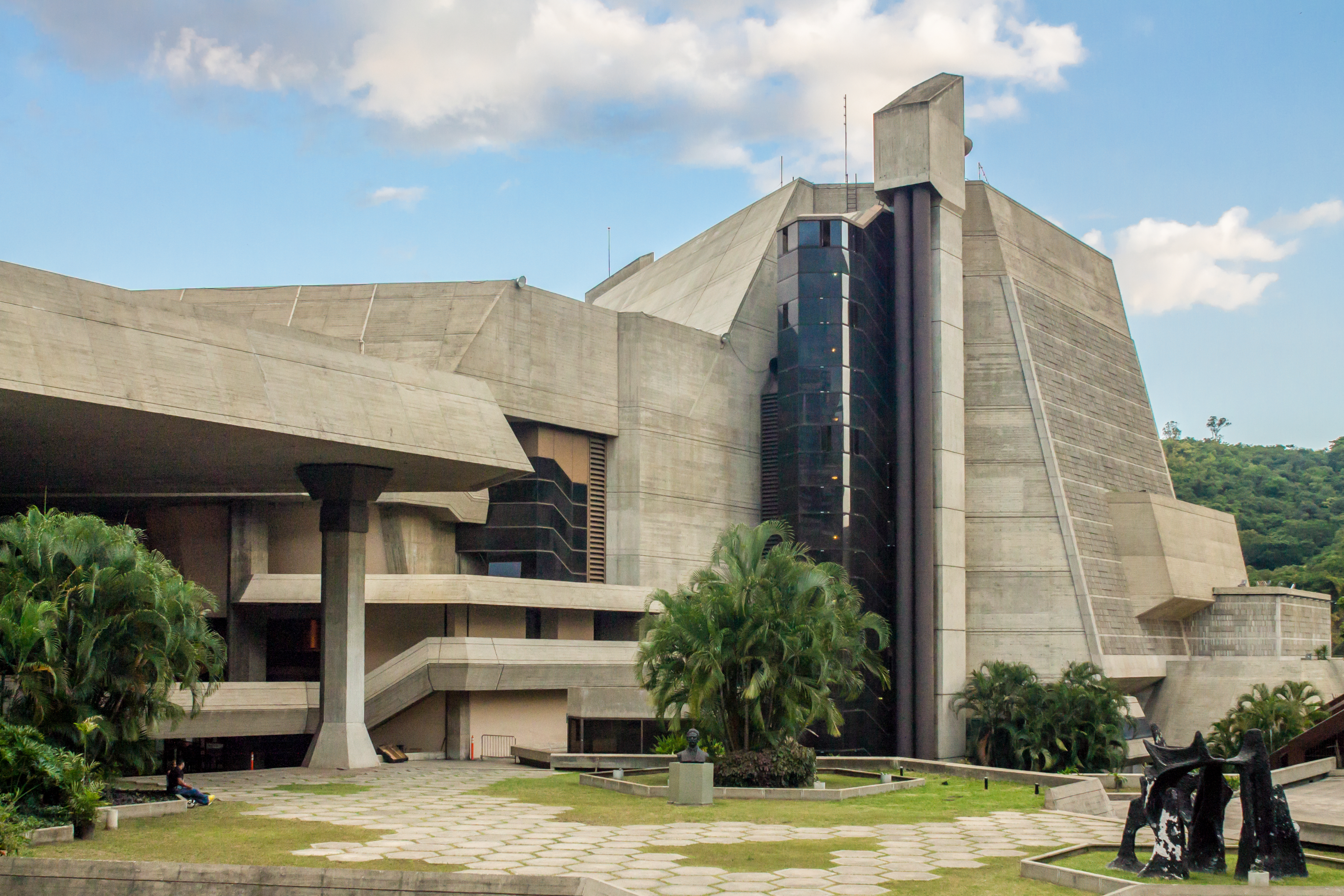
Teresa Carreño Cultural Complex, Caracas, Venezuela

- April 19 – Teresa Carreño Cultural Complex, Caracas, Venezuela, designed by Tomás Lugo Marcano, Jesús Sandoval and Dietrich Kunckel completed.
- May 1 – Church of the Holy Mother of God (Aleppo), Syria.
- October 15 – The Saddledome in Calgary, Alberta.
- October 21 – The Burrell Collection Building in Glasgow, Scotland, UK, designed by Barry Gasson.

=== Buildings completed ===
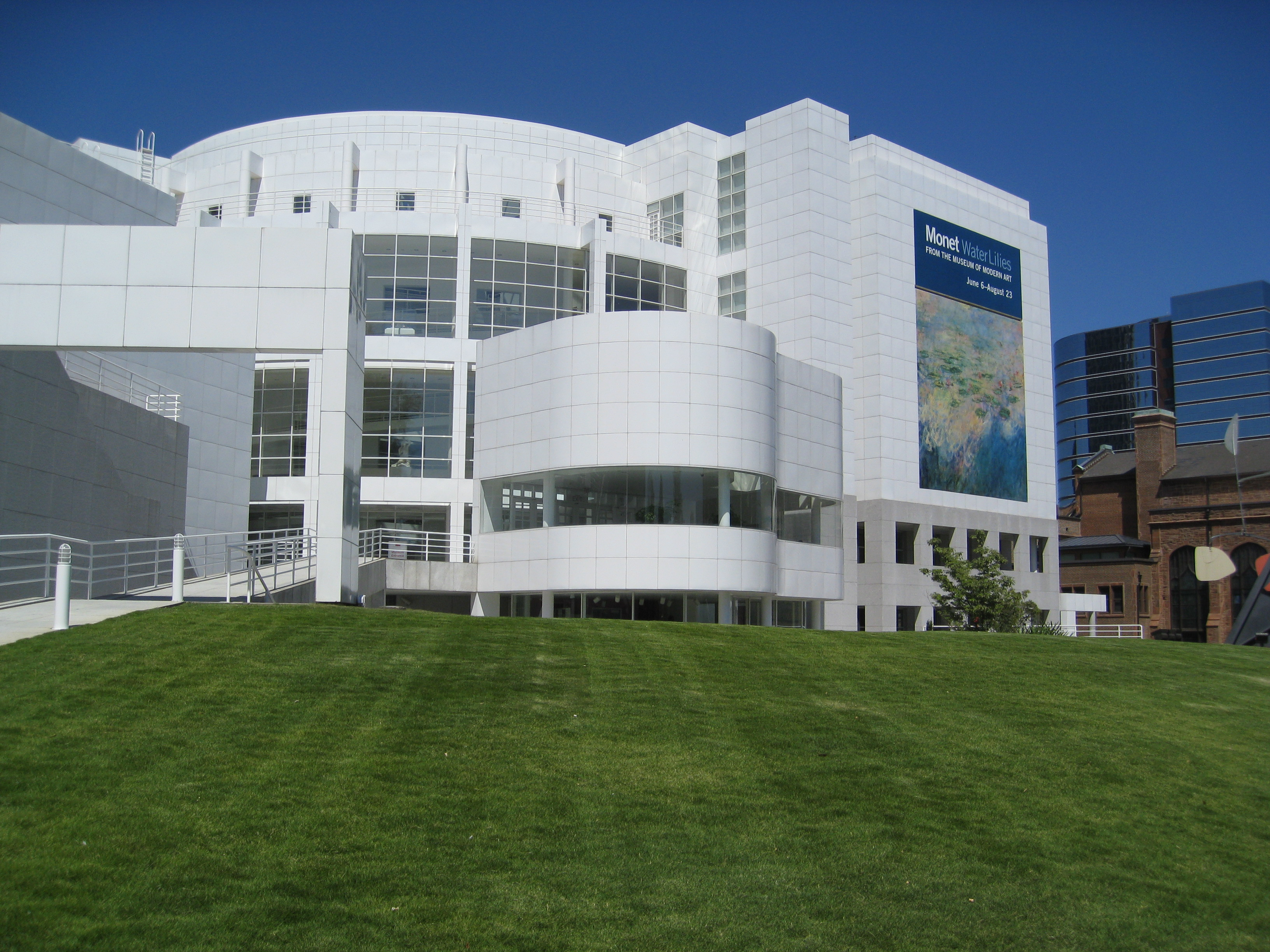
High Museum of Art in Atlanta, Georgia, USA

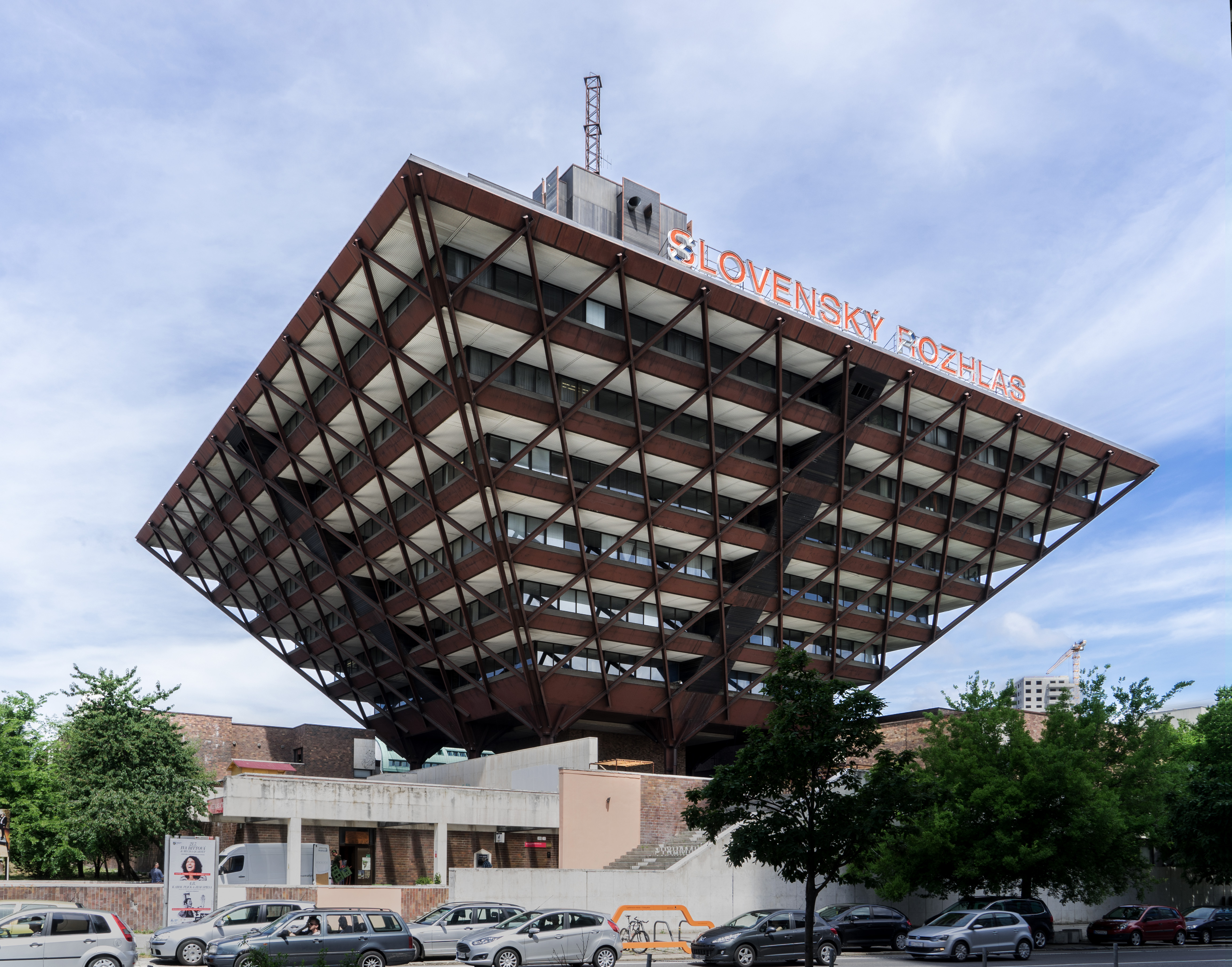
The Slovak Radio Building in Bratislava, Slovakia

- The Conoco-Phillips Building in Anchorage, Alaska.
- The Alma-Ata Tower in Almaty, Kazakhstan.
- Western Canadian Place in Calgary, Alberta
- Henningsvær Bridges, Norway.
- Wells Fargo Bank Plaza in Houston, Texas.
- Williams Tower/ Transco Tower in Houston, Texas.
- ARCO Tower in Dallas, Texas.
- The Mellon Bank Center in Philadelphia, Pennsylvania.
- Trump Tower in New York City.
- One Cleveland Center in Cleveland, Ohio.
- Manulife Place in Edmonton, Alberta
- Miami Center in Miami, Florida.
- High Museum of Art in Atlanta, Georgia, designed by Richard Meier,
- Pasilan linkkitorni tower, Helsinki, Finland.
- Slovak Radio Building in Bratislava, designed by Štefan Svetko, Štefan Ďurkovič and Barnabáš Kissling.
- Slovak National Archives in Bratislava, designed by Vladimir Dedeček.
- Sainsbury Building, Worcester College, Oxford, England, designed by Richard MacCormac.
- Forestry department offices (later Daugavkrasti Hotel), Jēkabpils, Latvia, designed by Vanda Baulina.
- Les Espaces d’Abraxas social housing complex, Marne-la-Vallée, France, designed by Ricardo Bofill Taller de Arquitectura.

=== Buildings designed ===
- Baghdad State Mosque (Iraq), designed by Rasem Badran; never built.

== Awards ==
- Aga Khan Award for Architecture – Zlatko Ugljen, for Šerefudin's White Mosque, built in Visoko.
- AIA Gold Medal – Nathaniel Alexander Owings.
- Architecture Firm Award – Holabird & Root.
- Pritzker Prize – I. M. Pei.
- RAIA Gold Medal – Gilbert Nic and Ross Chisholm.
- RIBA Royal Gold Medal – Norman Foster.
- Twenty-five Year Award – Price Tower.

== Deaths ==
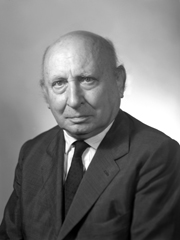
Giuseppe Samonà

- January 29 – Piloo Mody, Indian architect and politician (born 1926)
- July 1 – Richard Buckminster Fuller, American architect, systems theorist, author, designer, inventor and futurist (born 1895)
- June 12 – Clemens Holzmeister, Austrian architect and stage designer (born 1886)
- August 18
  - Nikolaus Pevsner, German-born historian of art and architecture, author of a series of county guides to English architecture (born 1902)
  - Jan Zachwatowicz, Polish architect, architectural historian and restorer (born 1900)
- Giuseppe Samoná, Italian architect (born 1898)
