= 1976 in architecture =

List of years in architecture	(table)
- … 1966; 1967; 1968; 1969; 1970; 1971; 1972; 1973; 1974; 1975; 1976; 1977; 1978; 1979; 1980; 1981; 1982; 1983; 1984; 1985; 1986 …
- Buildings and structures: Art; Archaeology; Architecture; Literature; Music; Philosophy; Science; +...

The year 1976 in architecture involved some significant architectural events and new buildings.

== Events ==
- October 4 – Tax Reform Act of 1976 in the United States is signed into law, establishing tax incentives designed to encourage the preservation of historic structures.

== Buildings and structures ==
=== Buildings completed and opened ===
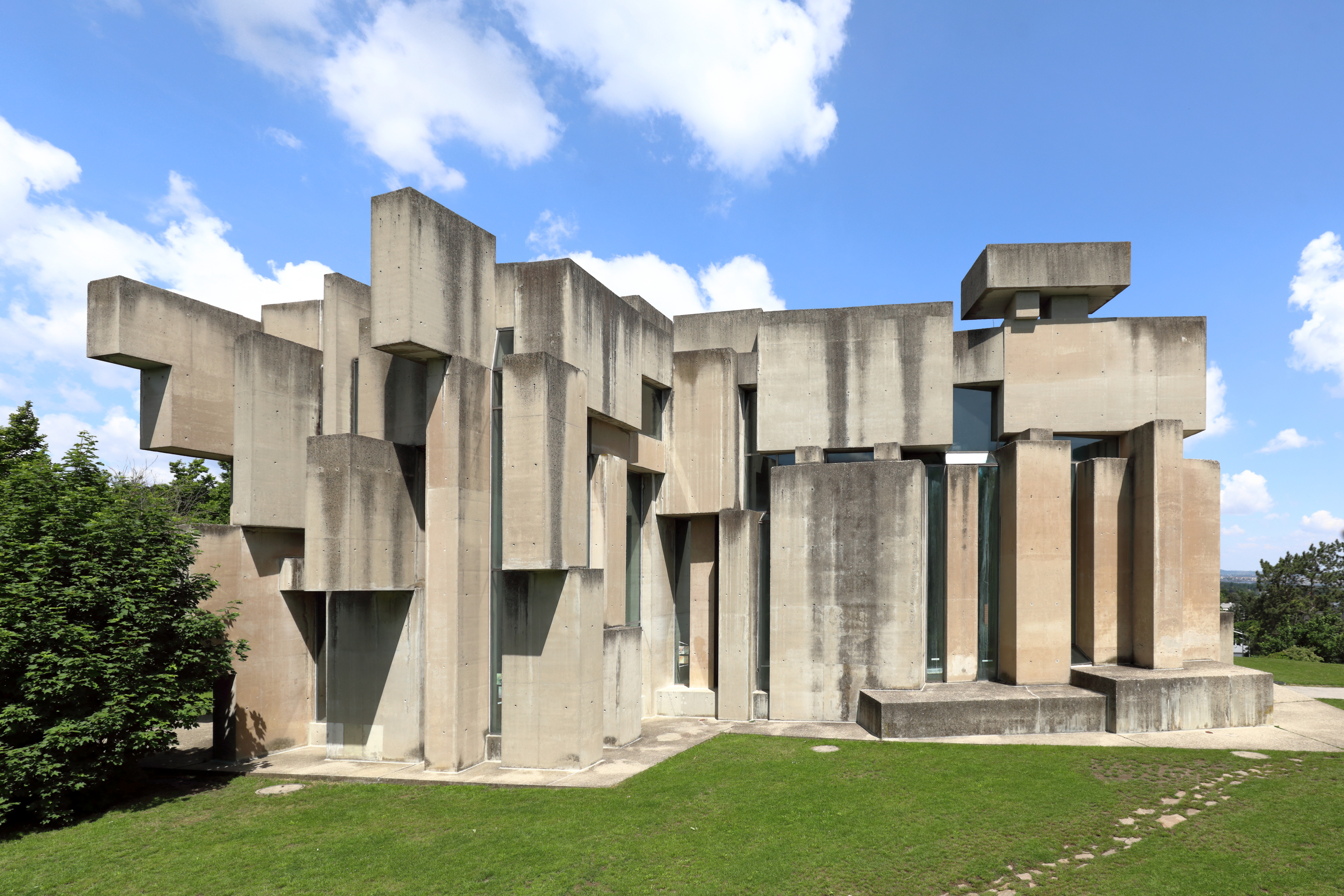
Wotruba Church in Vienna, Austria

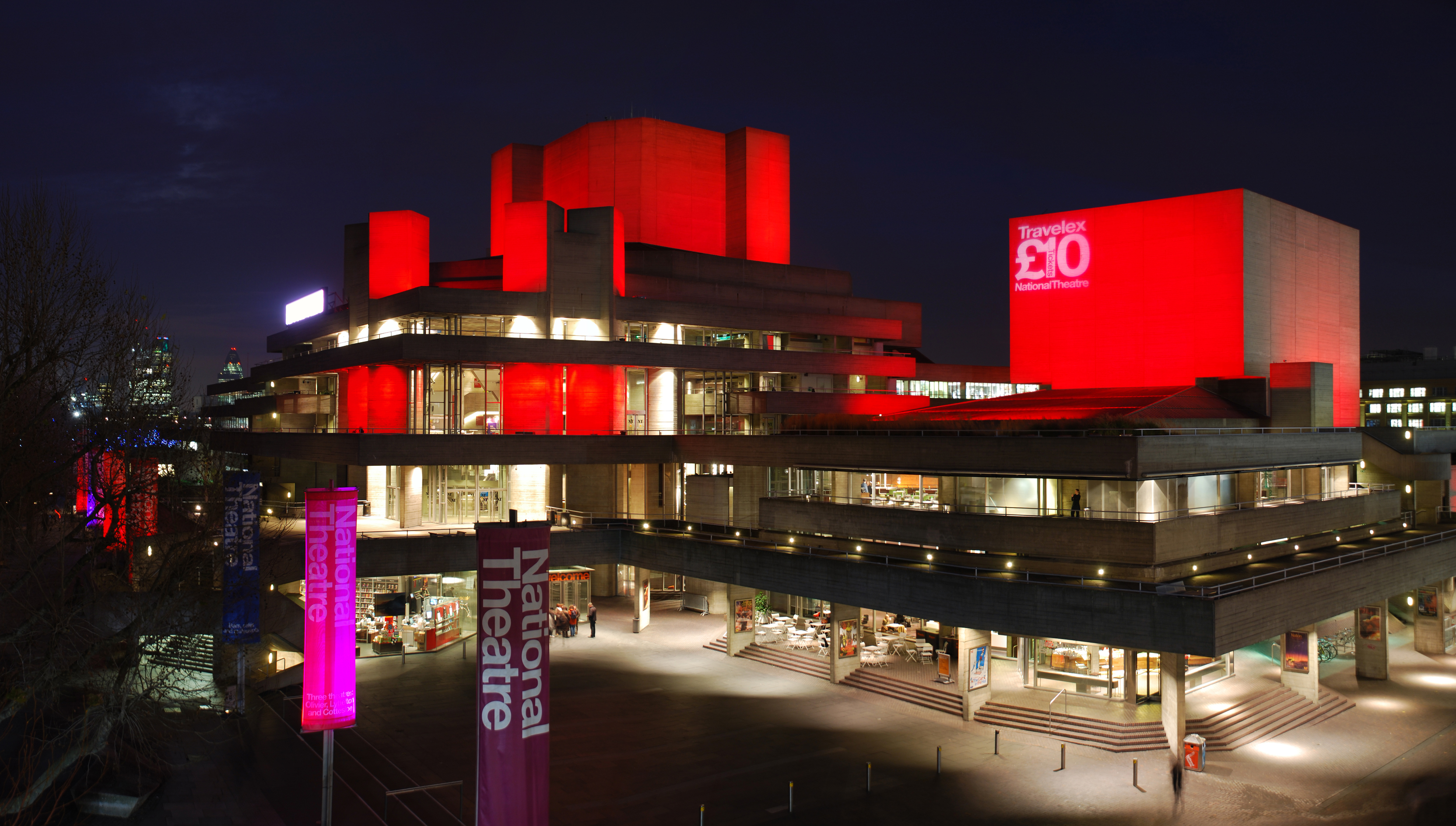
Royal National Theatre in London, England

- October – Wotruba Church (Kirche Zur Heiligsten Dreifaltigkeit) in Vienna, to a design by Fritz Wotruba, completed.
- October 1 – CN Tower in Toronto, Ontario, Canada, designed by WZMH Architects and John Andrews, opened.
- October 25 – Royal National Theatre on London's South Bank, designed by Denys Lasdun, opened.
- November 26 – The OCBC Centre in Singapore, designed by I. M. Pei & Partners, completed.
- Bagsværd Church in Copenhagen, Denmark, designed by Jørn Utzon, completed.
- John Hancock Tower in Boston, Massachusetts, designed by Henry N. Cobb of I. M. Pei & Partners.
- Scotia Centre (Calgary) in Calgary, Alberta.
- Federal Reserve Bank in Boston, Massachusetts, designed by Hugh Stubbins & Associates, is completed.
- Home Office building at 50 Queen Anne's Gate (now 102 Petty France), Westminster, London, designed by Basil Spence.
- Guildhall Library, Guildhall, London (City), designed by Richard Gilbert Scott, completed.
- Salters' Hall in the City of London, designed by Sir Basil Spence.
- Water Tower Place in Chicago, Illinois, designed by Edward D. Dart of Loebl Schlossman Bennett and Dart.
- Fernmeldeturm Koblenz near Koblenz in Germany.
- El Parque de la Marca Hispanica, Le Perthus, on the French/Spanish border, designed by Ricardo Bofill Taller de Arquitectura, completed.
- Ponte City Apartments in Johannesburg, South Africa, designed by Mannie Feldman.
- ABSA Tower in Johannesburg.
- First planned residential development at South Woodham Ferrers in England.
- Hopkins House, Hampstead, London, designed by Michael and Patty Hopkins as a home and architectural studio for themselves.
- The Round House (bungalow) at Stoke Canon in England, designed by Peter Blundell Jones and Gillian Smith.
- The replacement replica Kaohsiung Confucius Temple is built in Taiwan.
- Młotek in Warsaw, Poland, designed by Jan Bogusławski and Bohdan Gniewiewski.

== Awards ==
- Architecture Firm Award – Mitchell/Giurgola Architects
- Grand prix national de l'architecture – Roger Taillibert
- Rome Prize for architecture – Gunnar Birkerts
- RAIA Gold Medal – Harry Seidler
- RIBA Royal Gold Medal – John Summerson
- Twenty-five Year Award – 860–880 Lake Shore Drive Apartments

== Births ==
- 1976 – Ott Kadarik, Estonian architect
- date unknown – Antonio Pio Saracino, Italian-born US architect

== Deaths ==
- January 26 – Eric Francis, British architect and painter (born 1887)
- May 11 – Alvar Aalto, Finnish architect, designer, sculptor and painter (born 1898)
- November 19 – Sir Basil Spence, Scottish Modernist/Brutalist architect (born 1907)
- Nugent Cachemaille-Day, English ecclesiastical architect (born 1896)
