= Renée Gailhoustet =

French architect (1929–2023)

- Born: 15 September 1929; Oran, French Algeria
- Died: 4 January 2023 (aged 93); Ivry-sur-Seine, France
- Occupation: Architect
- Buildings: Town center, Ivry-sur-Seine: Raspail tower, Lenin tower, Spinoza tower, Casanova tower, Jeanne Hachette tower, and two 'terraced' buildings - the Liégat and the Marat.
- Projects: La Maladrerie district in Aubervilliers

Renée Gailhoustet (French pronunciation: [ʁəne ɡajustɛ]; 15 September 1929 – 4 January 2023) was a French architect known for her contribution to social housing in the Paris suburbs. She was one of the few female architects of her generation and one of the few prominent architects to build a career in the field of social housing.

== Early life ==
Gailhoustet was born in Oran, French Algeria on 15 September 1929. She was the daughter of Maurice Gailhoustet, accountant and then deputy director of the newspaper L'Écho d'Oran.

After embarking on philosophy studies at the Sorbonne, she earned a degree in letters. In 1952, she turned to architecture at the École des beaux-arts in Paris under Marcel Lods, André Hermant et Henri Trezzini, the only section that admitted women. She obtained her architecture diploma in 1961. It was there that she met Jean Renaudie, who was later to a become a close associate in many of her architectural projects. She was an activist in the Young Communists movement while at university and decided to go into architecture out of political conviction.

== Career ==
In 1962 she joined Roland Dubrulle's firm where she worked on plans for renovation of the centre of Ivry-sur-Seine, eventually becoming the chief architect together with Jean Renaudie. In 1968, the Raspail Tower was completed. She then designed the Lénine, Casanova and Jeanne Hachette towers, as well as the Spinoza estate. She followed up with the Liégat (where she lived for many years), which is a large complex combining 140 units of social housing and business premises, furnished with vegetated terraces and planted patios.

She became the Ivry’s chief architect in 1969. It was in this role that she invited Jean Renaudie to reflect with her on the master plan for the renovation. At Ivry, he obtained his first commissions as an independent architect. The cooperation between the two architects was intense, almost fusional, leading to differences of view on attribution – some commentators assert that Renaudie was her ‘mentor’, while others see a tendency, in the past, to give sole credit to Renaudie for projects that they worked on as equal partners. In any case, both architects were influenced by the emerging critique (e.g. by Team 10 in the 1950s) of rigid compartmentalization of functions in urban planning (e.g. as set forth in the Athens Charter).

Building on place Voltaire, Ivry-sur-Seine

Two buildings by Gailhoustet on place Voltaire, Ivry-sur-Seine

In her projects, Gailhoustet sought to instill the pleasure of inhabiting a place (le plaisir d'habiter) – quality of life was central to her mission. She rejected the principle of strict separation of functions that prevails in many large housing estates, though neither did she aim for a return to the traditional city. She instead promoted the interweaving of functions — housing, commerce and public services are intertwined in her model of urbanization. Pedestrians are not channeled in parallel with automobiles; they move through pedestrian zones, bridges and stairways.

The residences she created were unconventional and non-standardized. With her emphasis on individual terraces and multi-level and open floor plans, she offered to residents a quality of architecture that is not typically associated with social housing. Her preferred building material was béton brut – unfinished concrete – but she complemented it with ample space for vegetation. In 1964, she founded her own firm. Together with Renaudie, she put forward plans for a terraced approach to construction at Ivry-sur-Seine. Instead of large complexes, she planned varied and idiosyncratic buildings, separated by open spaces, creating new perspectives for the town and its social housing developments. In Ivry, between the late 1960s and the mid-1980s, Gailhoustet designed the Raspail, Lénine, Jeanne-Hachette and Casanova towers, the Spinoza complex and the terraced apartment buildings, le Liégat and Marat. Her development of the La Maladrerie district in Aubervilliers, completed in 1984, with its blend of diverse flats, an old people's home, artists' studios and shops, is a typical example of her approach. By providing a variety of options, she believed "each inhabitant can use the town as he wishes."

Gailhoustet's projects are to be found mainly in the Paris suburbs – first and foremost, at Ivry-sur-Seine and Aubervilliers, but also in Saint-Denis (renovation of the Ilot Basilique, 1981–1985), Villejuif, Romainville and Villetaneuse. In addition, she undertook two developments on the island of La Réunion.

Renée Gailhoustet always lived in the buildings she designed, first in the Raspail tower and, 14 years later, in the Liégat.

She taught at the École Spéciale d'Architecture from 1973 to 1975 and has published a number of books.

== Late career and death ==
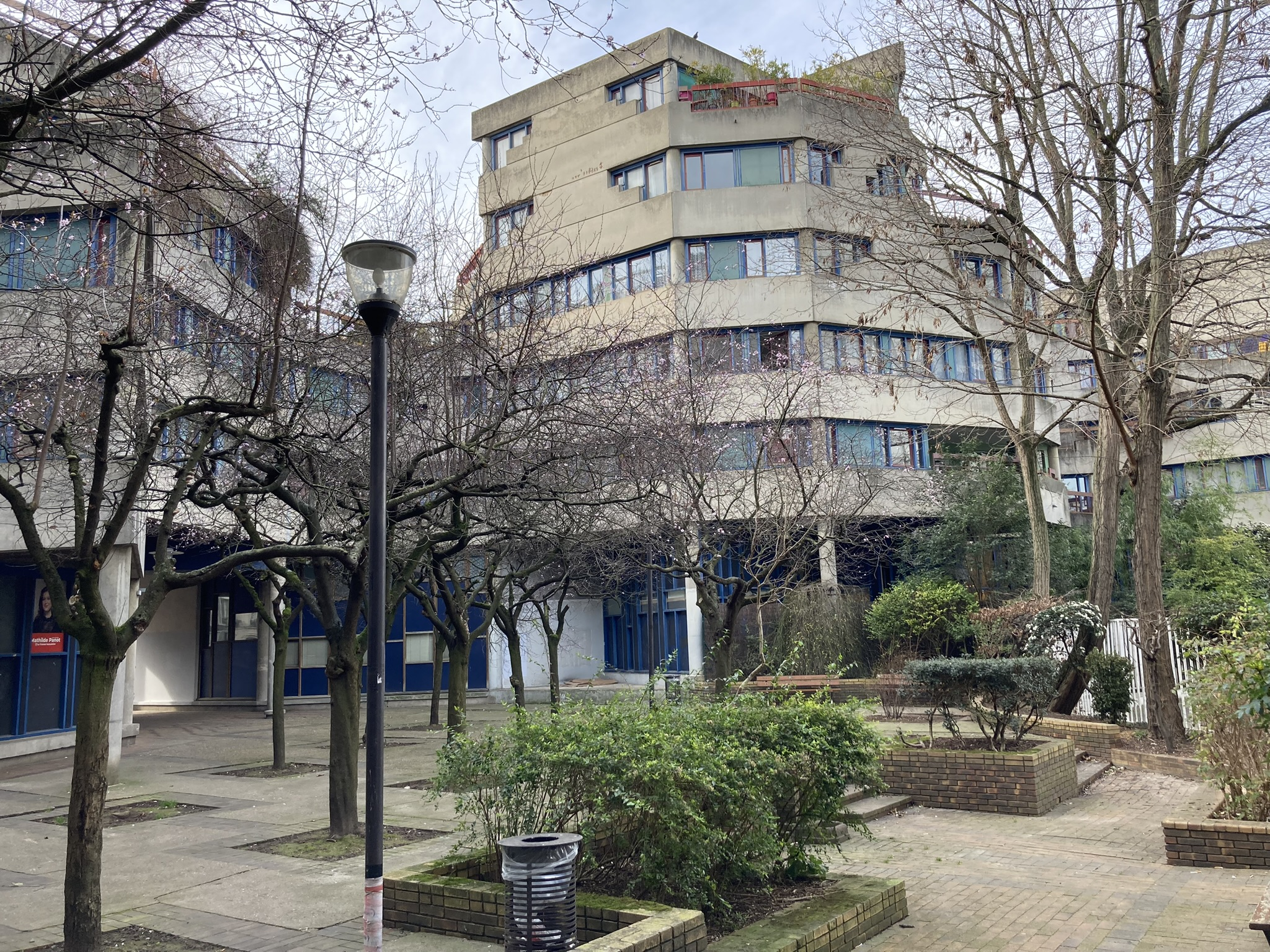
Le Liėgat, as seen from a courtyard

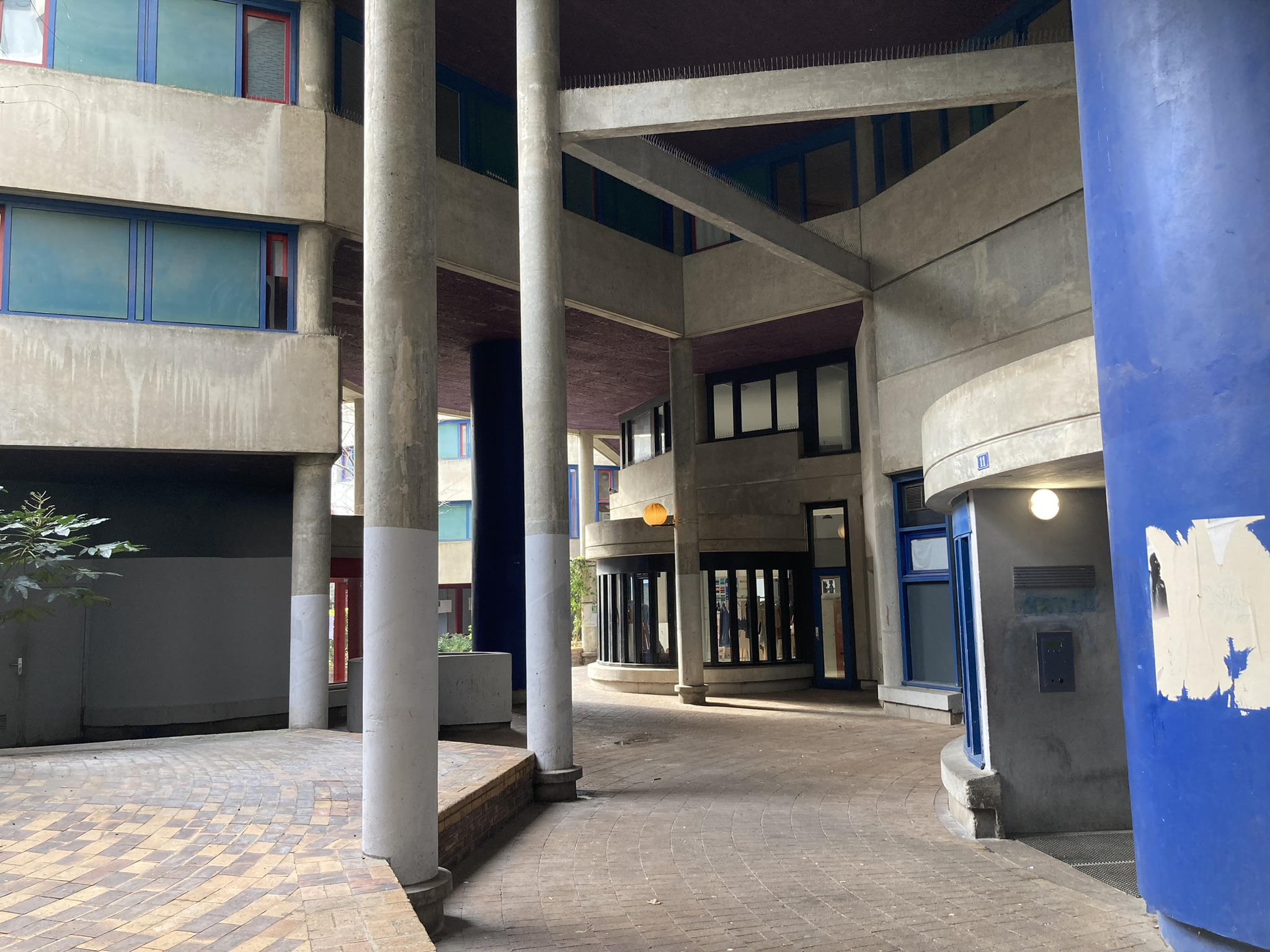
An inner promenade in the Liégat

In 1999, Gailhoustet had to close her architecture practice for lack of mandates. Starting from the 1980s, her idiosyncratic style of architecture was no longer à la mode. Post-modernism was the dominant trend at the time and profitability the dominant concern.

Summarising Gailhoustet’s career, British architect, Farshid Moussavi, president of the 2022 jury of the Royal Academy of Arts, stated:

Renée Gailhoustet's achievements reach far beyond what is produced as social or affordable housing anywhere today. Her work has a strong social commitment that brings together generosity, beauty, ecology and inclusivity".

Gailhoustet died on 4 January 2023, at the age of 93, in the Liégat, Ivry-sur-Seine. In her elegy for Gailhoustet, the French Minister of Culture, Rima Abdul Lalak, stated:

By choosing to organise lived space along diversified, varied, surprising and complex paths – like life itself – Renée Gailhoustet has shown us that there are a thousand and one ways of inhabiting our world and that the walls of dwellings can serve more to liberate us than to lock us up.

== Recognition ==
- 2017 : Commandeur de l’ordre des Arts et des Lettres
- 2018 : Medal of Honor of the l'Académie d'architecture (the French order of Architects)
- 2019 : Berlin Art Prize (Großer Kunstpreis Berlin)
- 2022 : Royal Academy of Arts, Architecture Prize
- 2022 : Grand prix national de l'architecture (GPNA, a prize awarded by the French Ministry of Culture)
- 2022 : Raspail tower is added to the list of Monuments historiques by the French Ministry of Culture

== Literature ==
Own works:

- Des racines pour la ville, éditions de l'Épure, 1998, 151 p.
- Éloge du logement, éditions Massimo Riposati, 1993, 95 p.
- Le panoramique et l'Observatoire de la ville, éditions Ne Pas Plier, 2000
