= 1900 in architecture =

The year 1900 in architecture involved some significant events.

== Buildings and structures ==
=== Buildings ===
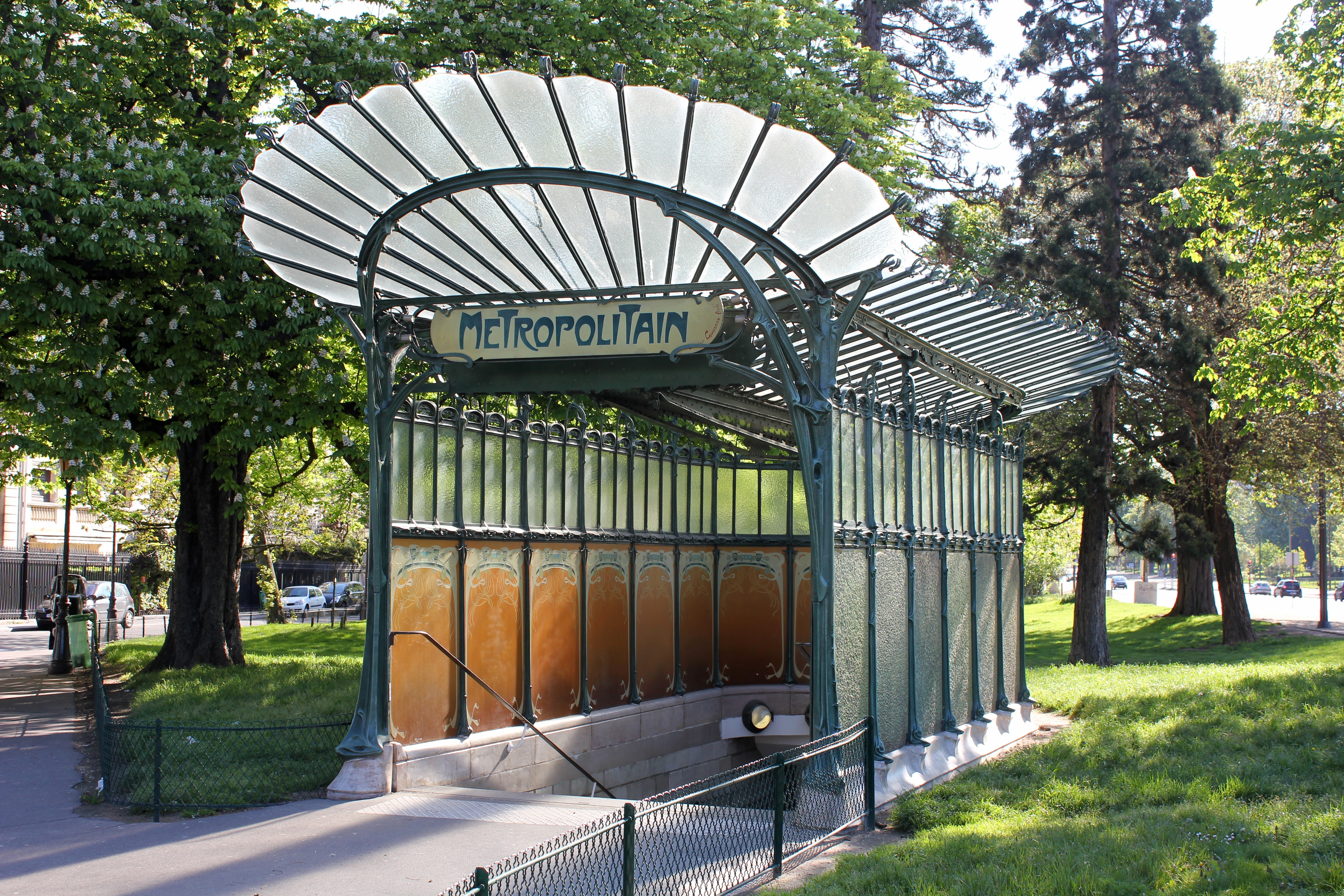
The Paris Métro in France

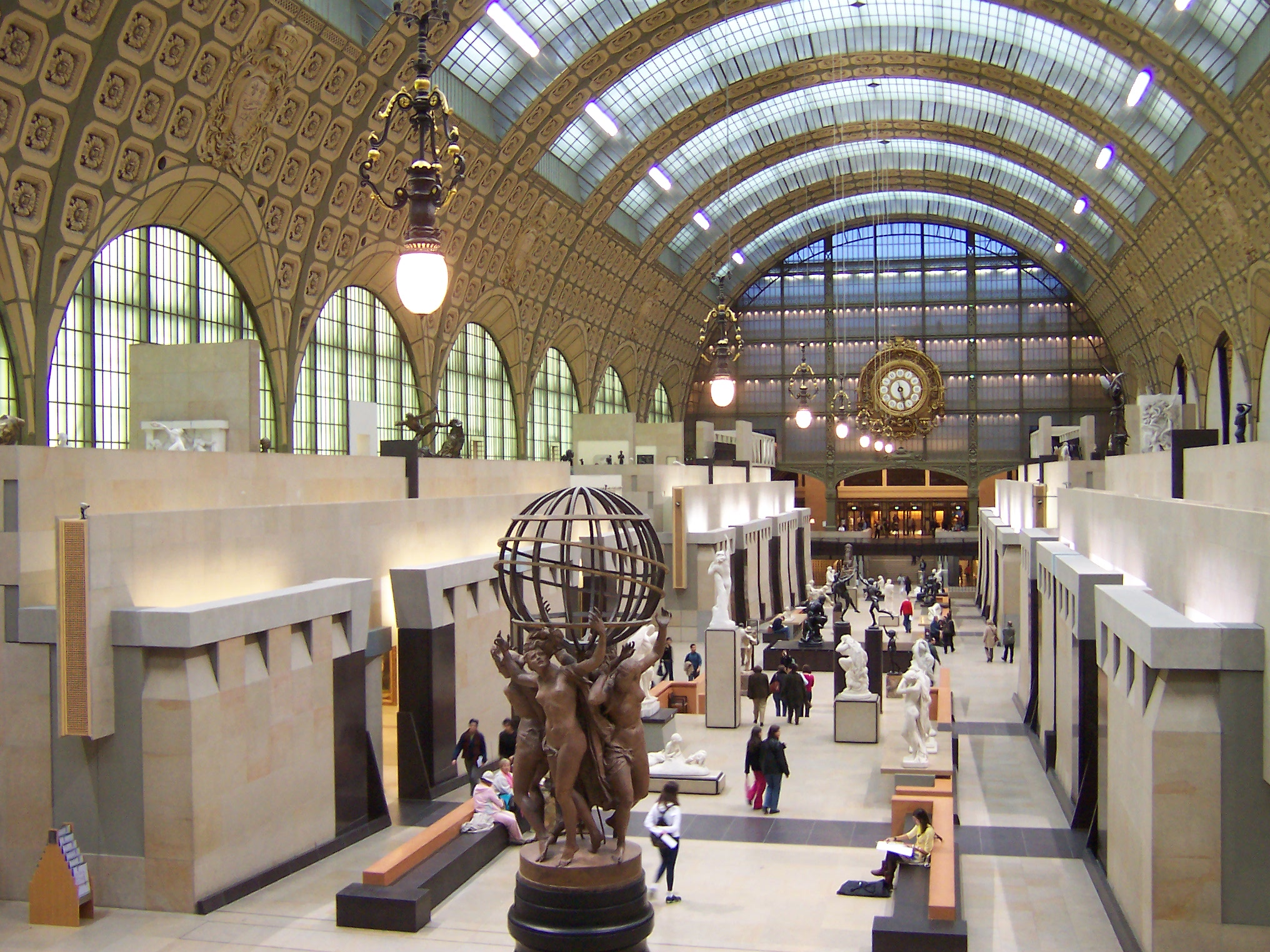
Musée d'Orsay in Paris, France

- May 30 — Daniel Burnham's Gilbert M. Simmons Memorial Library and Soldiers and Sailors Monument are dedicated together in Kenosha, Wisconsin
- July 19 – The Paris Métro opens, with entrances designed by Hector Guimard in 1899.
- November 11 – Church of Sant'Anselmo all'Aventino in Rome, designed by Abbot Hildebrand de Hemptinne, is consecrated.
- Antoni Gaudí begins work on the Parc Güell, which he works on for the next fourteen years.
- The Gare d'Orsay, the modern-day Musée d'Orsay, is built in Paris by Victor Laloux.
- The Joseph Chamberlain Memorial Clock Tower at the University of Birmingham, England, is completed.
- The Administration Building of Southwestern University, Georgetown, Texas, designed by physicist and University President Robert Stewart Hyer, is completed.
- The OXO Tower in London, England, is completed.
- The Co-Operative Wholesale Society warehouse, the modern-day Malmaison Hotel, on the Quayside, Newcastle upon Tyne, England, designed by T. G. Guerrite for Louis Gustave Mouchel on the principles of François Hennebique with F. E. L. Harris as CWS architect, is completed.
- The Imprimerie Royer (Royer Printing House) in Nancy, France, designed by Lucien Weissenburger, is completed.
- Alexander Nevsky Cathedral, Tallinn, designed by Mikhail Preobrazhensky, is completed.
- Dohodno Zdanie, Rousse, Bulgaria.
- Villa Schutzenberger in Strasbourg, France, is completed.
- Kinloch Castle on the isle of Rùm, Scotland, designed by Leeming & Leeming, is completed.
- Bullough Mausoleum on the isle of Rùm, Scotland, built (approximate date).
- Victoria Theatre, Salford, England opens.
- The Orchard, Chorleywood, England, a house designed by C. F. A. Voysey for himself, is completed.

== Awards ==
- RIBA Royal Gold Medal – Rodolfo Amadeo Lanciani.
- Grand Prix de Rome, architecture: Paul Bigot.

== Births ==
- February 6 – Paul László, Hungarian-born architect (died 1993)
- March 4 - Jan Zachwatowicz, Polish architect (died 1983)
- March 23 – Hassan Fathy, Egyptian architect (died 1989)
- April 5 – Herbert Bayer, Austrian-born graphic designer (died 1985)
- May 28 – Arieh Sharon, Galician-born Israeli architect (died 1984)
- August 25 – Isobel Hogg Kerr Beattie, Scottish architect (died 1970)
- October 8 – Geoffrey Jellicoe, English landscape architect (died 1996)
- November 3 – Guillermo Gonzalez Sanchez, Dominican architect (died 1970)

== Deaths ==
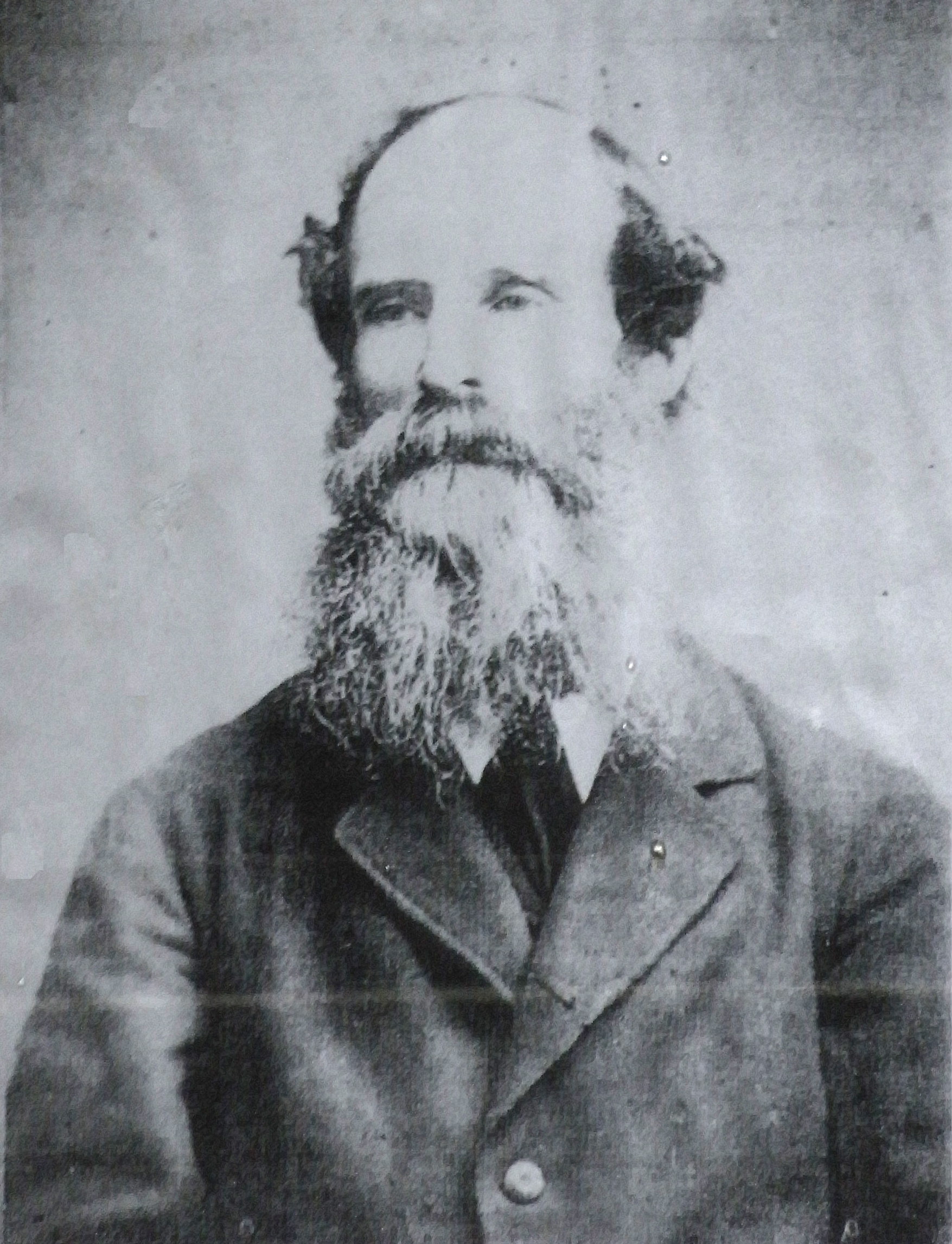
William White

- February 20 – John Giles, English architect (born c.1830)
- February 23 – William Butterfield, English ecclesiastical architect (born 1814)
- April 16 – Dankmar Adler, German American architect (born 1844)
- June 2 – Charles Barry, Jr., English architect (born 1823)
- August 18 – Edward Habershon, English ecclesiastical architect (born 1826)
- October 27 – Charles Henry Driver, English architect (born 1832)
- William White, English ecclesiastical architect (born 1825)
