= Jean Renaudie =

French architect and town-planner

Jean Renaudie (8 June 1925 – 13 October 1981) was a French architect and town-planner.

== Biography ==
Jean Renaudie joined the École nationale supérieure des beaux-arts in 1945, studying in the studios of Auguste Perret then Marcel Lods. Gaining his architect's licence in 1958, he founded l'Atelier de Montrouge with Pierre Riboulet, Gérard Thurnauer and Jean-Louis Véret (whom he met in 1956). He practiced a form of architecture that, due to its starkness and the simplicity of its plastic effects, is described as 'brutalist'. His studio stood out whether with the crèche in Montrouge or with the Vincennes stadium (contest, June 1963).

He split with the other members of the Atelier in 1968. In addition to their disagreements about the events of May 1968, they clashed on the planning of the new town Val-de-Reuil. Renaudie would have liked to put the town on the cliff overlooking the flat, wet site intended at the beginning. He thus created his own agency in Ivry-sur-Seine. From 1971 to 1975 and from 1976 to 1980, he participated in two phases of the renovation of the centre of Ivry, in collaboration with Renée Gailhoustet. One of his projects, the Jeanne-Hachette shopping centre, gave him international recognition.

From 1974, he worked on the renovation of the centre of old Givors, creating the City of Stars. Between 1976 and 1981, he participated in the urban development zone in Villetaneuse.

He won the grand prix national de l'architecture from the French Minister of Culture for the sum of his works. The main focus of his work was on social housing and urban planning. He had been one of the first opponents of the construction methods of the major housing estates ('grands ensembles') and the first new towns in the 1950s and 1960s. He never wished to systematise architecture, creating a wide variety and diversity of apartments in his housing projects.

One of his major achievements is found in Givors, at the foot of the ruined château. These blocks of social housing, on the side of a hill, have a very special architecture, which seeks to optimise the views and orientations of the houses.

== Major studies and projects ==
=== As part of l'Atelier de Montrouge (ATM1) ===
This list only includes projects directly monitored by Renaudie.

- 1959-1964: crèche, Montrouge
- 1960-1968: fire station, rue de la Vannes, Montrouge
- 1961-1962: study for 1000 individual houses, Goussainville (Eure-et-Loir)
- 1963: contest for a 100,000-seat stadium, Vincennes;
- 1962: development plan, Tralicetto estate, commune de Sartène (Corse-du-Sud) (urban centre and hotel complex) (not built)
- 1962-1964: Coumipez estate, holiday village Bonne Terrasse in Ramatuelle (in association with Louis Arretche)
- 1964-1966: study for the reduction of the slum in Francs-Moisins, Saint-Denis (Seine-Saint-Denis) (in association with Louis Arretche)
- 1963-1964: Gigaro holiday village, Croix-Valmer estate (Var) (in association with Louis Arretche)
- 1967-1968: first research for the new town of Vaudreuil, now Val-de-Reuil, study of solution C, 'The town on the cliff

=== In his own name ===
- 1970: école des Plants, Cergy-Pontoise
- 1970-1972: operation 'Danielle Casanova' in Ivry-sur-Seine (Val-de-Marne), with 80 houses, shops and offices; in collaboration with Renée Gailhoustet
- 1970-1975: operation 'Jeanne Hachette' in Ivry-sur-Seine with 40 houses, shops, offices and cinema; in collaboration with Renée Gailhoustet
- 1973-1975: operation 'Jean-Baptiste Clément' in Ivry-sur-Seine with 10 houses et shops, in collaboration with Renée Gailhoustet
- 1974: renovation of old Givors (Rhône) with 270 houses, shops, library, crèche, theatre and police station
- 1974-1982: urban regeneration of the centre of Saint-Martin-d'Hères (Isère) with houses, offices and shops
- 1975-1981: urban regeneration zone apartment blocks, Courghain, commune de Grande-Synthe, near Dunkirk; 180 houses (partially destroyed in 2009)
- 1976-1981: operation 'le Vieux Pays' in Villetaneuse (Seine-Saint-Denis), 147 houses, library et shops
- 1978-1983: 'cité du parc' in Ivry-sur-Seine, 147 houses et shops
- 1979-1982: Einstein school in Ivry-sur-Seine
- 1980: housing for the urban regeneration zone in Coureau, La Courneuve (Seine-Saint-Denis), study completed by Hugues Marcucci

== Publications ==
- Jean Renaudie, la logique de la complexité, edited by Patrice Goulet and Nina Schuch, ed. Institut français d'urbanisme / Edizioni Carte Segrete, Paris, 1992, 315 p.
