= Jean-Louis Véret =

French architect

Jean-Louis Véret (1927–2011) was a French architect.

Véret was born in Paris. He entered the École nationale supérieure des beaux-arts in 1945. Following his studies he travelled in North Africa and worked from 1953 to 1955 in Ahmedabad for Le Corbusier's office.

Véret was a founder, in 1958, of the Atelier de Montrouge, with Pierre Riboulet, Gérard Thurnauer and Jean Renaudie. He also opened his own architecture office in Montrouge, which he ran until 1999.

Véret died at Saint-Georges-de-Didonne.
