= 1999 in architecture =

The year 1999 in architecture involved some significant architectural events and new buildings.

== Events ==
- April 19 – The Bundestag holds its first meeting at the Reichstag building in Berlin (following a redesign by Norman Foster) since 1933.

== Buildings and structures ==
=== Buildings opened ===
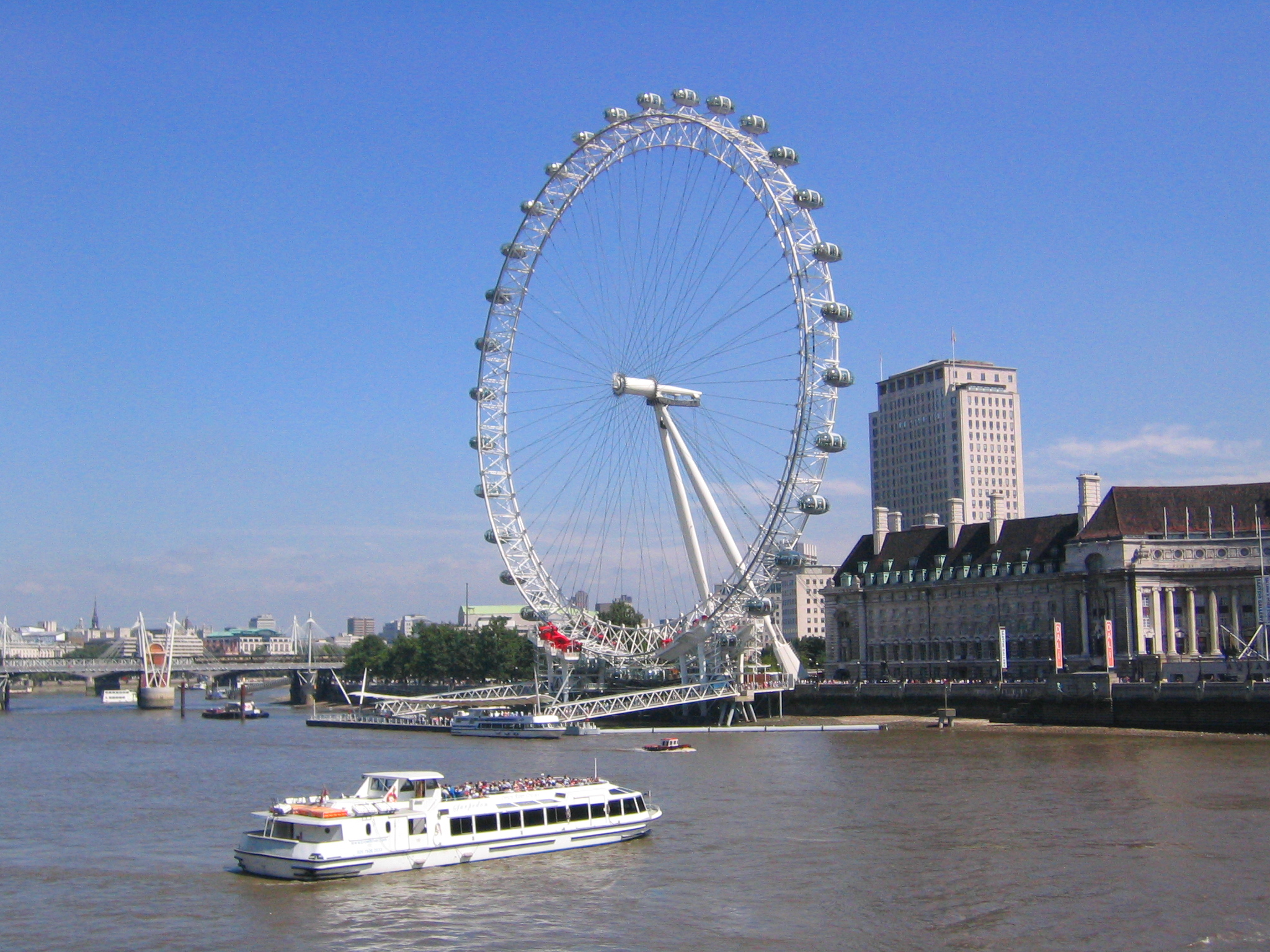
London Eye seen from Westminster Bridge

- March – Pero's Bridge in Bristol, England, designed by Eilis O'Connell with Ove Arup & Partners.
- March 6 – Stadium Australia in Sydney, Australia.
- May 3 – The Venetian Las Vegas, United States (casino resort), designed by KlingStubbins.
- September 7 – Black Diamond (library) (part of Royal Danish Library) in Copenhagen, designed by Schmidt Hammer Lassen Architects.
- September 14 - Sainsbury's, Greenwich is opened in London, designed by Chetwoods.
- October – Peggy Notebaert Nature Museum, Chicago, Illinois, designed by Perkins and Will.
- October 8 – The new Embassy of the United States, Ottawa, Canada, designed by David Childs, is dedicated by President Bill Clinton.
- December – Burj al Arab, Dubai, United Arab Emirates.
- December 31
  - London Eye, designed by David Marks and Julia Barfield.
  - Millennium Dome in London, designed by Richard Rogers.
  - Jubilee Line Extension of the London Underground Jubilee line.

=== Buildings completed ===
Burj Al Arab in Dubai, United Arab Emirates

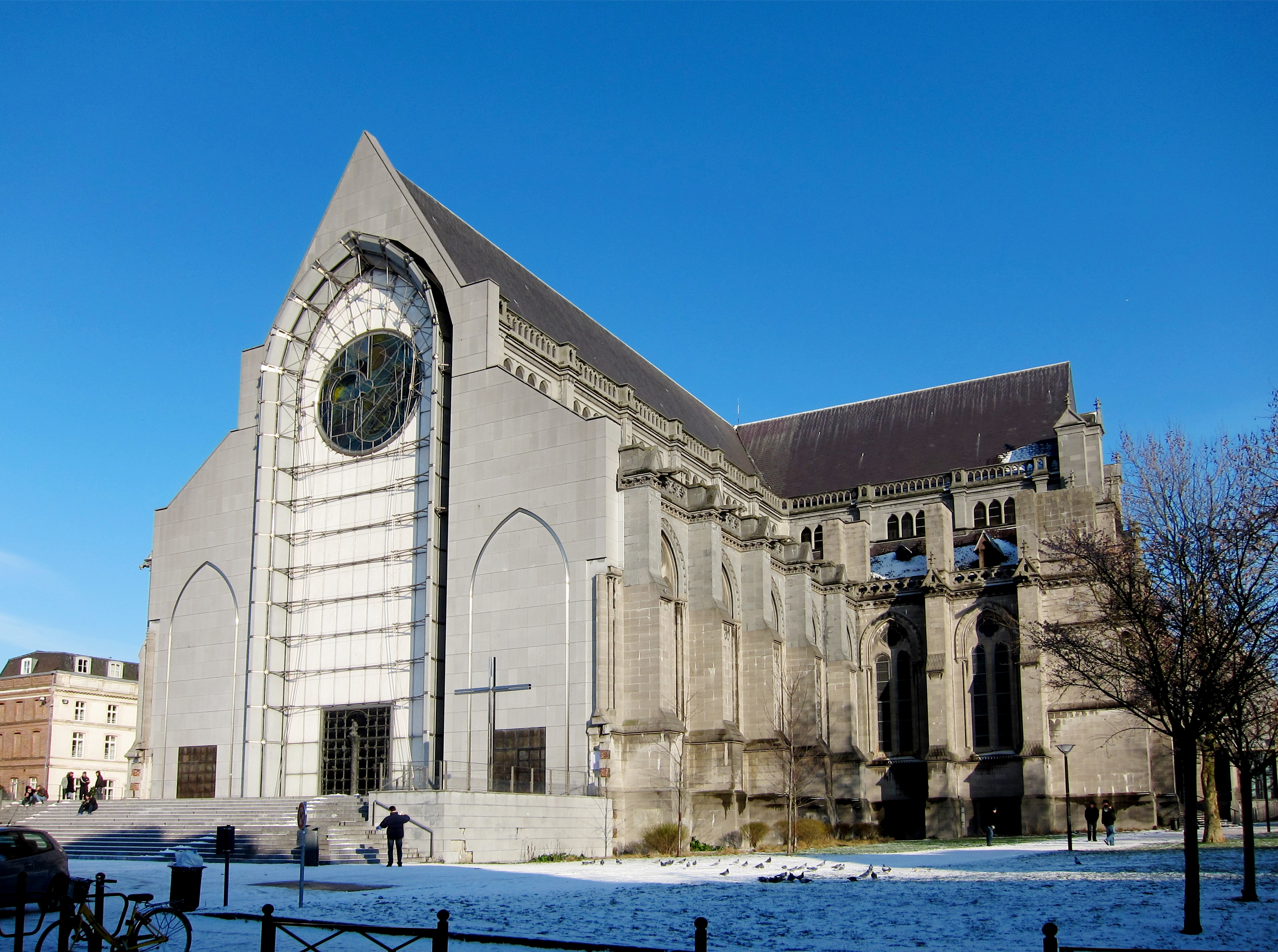
Lille Cathedral in France

- Burj Al Arab in Dubai, United Arab Emirates, designed by Tom Wright
- March – Main Tower in Frankfurt, Germany.
- Jewish Museum, Berlin, designed by Daniel Libeskind.
- Lille Cathedral in France (Basilica of Notre Dame de la Treille), begun in 1854.
- Palais de Justice de Bordeaux, Bordeaux, France, designed by Richard Rogers Partnership.
- Town Hall extension, Murcia, Spain, by Rafael Moneo.
- Kursaal Congress Centre and Auditorium, San Sebastián, Basque Country, Spain, by Rafael Moneo.
- Great Court of the British Museum, redesigned by Norman Foster.
- Maretas Museum, Lanzarote, designed by Enric Miralles Benedetta Tagliabue.
- Millennium Tower in Vienna, Austria.
- Arthur and Yvonne Boyd Centre, Riversdale, West Cambewarra, New South Wales, Australia, designed by Glenn Murcutt with Reg Lark and Wendy Lewin.
- Conde Nast Building in Manhattan, New York City, United States.
- Lloyd's Register building, London, designed by Richard Rogers Partnership.
- 88 Wood Street, London, designed by Richard Rogers Partnership.
- Lord's Media Centre in London by Future Systems.
- Melbourne Museum by architects Denton Corker Marshall, Melbourne, Australia.
- The Lighthouse (Glasgow), a conversion by Page\Park Architects of John Keppie's offices for The Glasgow Herald, opens as Scotland's Centre for Architecture, Design and the city.
- Culture House ("Hagymaház" auditorium), Makó, Hungary, designed by Imre Makovecz.
- Contact Theatre in Manchester, England, rebuilt by Alan Short and Associates.
- Daimler complex (Linkstraße), Potsdamer Platz, Berlin, designed by Richard Rogers Partnership.
- House at La Clota, Barcelona, Catalonia, designed by Benedetta Tagliabue.
- Reconstructed House of the Blackheads in Riga, Latvia.
- Vistet Fritid (vacation cabin) prototype, Sweden, designed by Thomas Sandell and Anders Landström.
- University of Warsaw Library, Poland, by Marek Budzyński.
- Supreme Court of Poland, Poland, by Marek Budzyński.
- Hundertwasser Toilets, Kawakawa, New Zealand, designed by Friedensreich Hundertwasser.

== Awards ==
- AIA Gold Medal – Frank Gehry
- Architecture Firm Award – Perkins and Will
- Grand Prix de l'urbanisme – Philippe Panerai and Nathan Starkman
- Grand prix national de l'architecture – Massimiliano Fuksas
- Praemium Imperiale Architecture Laureate – Fumihiko Maki
- Pritzker Architecture Prize – Norman Foster
- Prix de l'Académie d'Architecture de France – Jean Nouvel
- RAIA Gold Medal – Richard Leplastrier
- RIBA Royal Gold Medal – Barcelona
- Stirling Prize – Future Systems for Lord's Media Centre, London
- Thomas Jefferson Medal in Architecture – Richard Rogers
- Twenty-five Year Award – John Hancock Center
- UIA Gold Medal – Ricardo Legorreta Vilchis
- Vincent Scully Prize – Vincent Scully

== Deaths ==
- January 14 – Aldo van Eyck, Dutch Structuralist architect (born 1918)
- January 23 – Jay Pritzker, American entrepreneur, founder of the Pritzker Architecture Prize (born 1922)
- August 15 – Sir Hugh Casson, British architect, interior designer, artist, writer and broadcaster on 20th-century design (born 1910)
- October 3 – Gordon Tait, British architect (born 1912)
- October 27 – Charlotte Perriand, French architect and designer (born 1903)
