= Henri Gaudin =

French architect (1933–2021)

- Born: 25 September 1933; Paris, France
- Died: 5 March 2021 (aged 87)
- Education: École des Beaux-Arts
- Occupation: Architect
- Relatives: Paul Arzens (cousin)

Henri Gaudin (French pronunciation: [ɑ̃ʁi ɡodɛ̃]; 25 September 1933 – 5 March 2021) was a French architect.

== Early life ==
Henri Gaudin was born on 25 September 1933 in Paris, and he grew up in La Rochelle. Paul Arzens was his cousin.

Gaudin graduated from the École des Beaux-Arts.

== Career ==
Gaudin designed the nursery and primary schools in Souppes-sur-Loing with Charles Maj in 1970. In 1980, he designed buildings in Maurepas and Saint-Quentin-en-Yvelines.

With his son Bruno, Gaudin renovated the Stade Sébastien Charléty in Paris. They also redesigned the Guimet Museum in 2001.

Gaudin became a professor of architecture at the École nationale supérieure d'architecture de Versailles in 1987.

Gaudin turned down the Grand prix national de l'architecture in 1988. However, he accepted the 1994 Prix de l'Équerre d'Argent, which he was awarded with his son Bruno for their design of the Stade Sébastien Charléty.

== Personal life ==
Gaudin resided in Belleville, Paris.

He died on 5 March 2021 at the age of 87.

== Works ==
- La cabane et le labyrinthe (éditions Mardaga, 1984)
- Seuil et d'ailleurs (éditions du demi-cercle, 1992)
- Naissance d'une forme (éditions Norma, 2001)
- Considérations sur l'espace (éditions du Rocher, 2003)
- Hors les murs (Éditions Nicolas Chaudun, 2012)
