= 1978 in architecture =

The year 1978 in architecture involved some significant architectural events and new buildings.

== Buildings and structures ==
=== Buildings completed ===
- Sunshine 60 in Tokyo, Japan
- Reunion Tower in Dallas, Texas
- United Nations City in Vienna, Austria
- London Borough of Camden low-rise high-density social housing schemes completed on Alexandra Road Estate (designed by Neave Brown in 1968) and Branch Hill (by Gordon Benson and Alan Forsyth).
- Commercial Street Housing in Perth, Scotland, designed by James Parr & Partners.
- Angoori Bagh Housing in Pakistan, designed by Yasmeen Lari
- Sanctuary of Meritxell, Andorra, designed by Ricardo Bofill Taller de Arquitectura
- Sheep Field Barn (sculpture gallery for Henry Moore Foundation), Perry Green, Hertfordshire, UK, designed by Hawkins\Brown.
- Comodoro Rivadavia Cathedral in Argentina is dedicated.
- Gehry House by Frank Gehry in Santa Monica, California.

== Events ==
- Herzog & de Meuron Architekten set up in Basel.
- Manfredi Nicoletti publishes L'ecosistema urbano (The Urban ecosystem) - a term that he himself has coined.
- Colin Rowe and Fred Koetter publish Collage City.

== Awards ==
- AIA Gold Medal – Philip Johnson
- Alvar Aalto Medal – James Stirling (architect)
- Architecture Firm Award – Harry Weese & Associates
- Grand prix national de l'architecture – Jean Renaudie
- RAIA Gold Medal – Mervyn Parry
- RIBA Royal Gold Medal – Jørn Utzon
- Twenty-five Year Award – Eames House

== Births ==
- Brian James Walker was born in Leith, Edinburgh on February. 17, 1978.

== Deaths ==
- January 27 – Thomas Sharp, English urban planner (born 1901)
- March 1 – Léon Azéma, French architect (born 1888)
- April 9 – Clough Williams-Ellis, British architect (born 1883)
- August 21 – Charles Eames, American designer (born 1907)
- September 6 – Jo van den Broek, Dutch architect (born 1898)
- November 4 – Alfred Albini, Croatian architect and urban planner (born 1896)
- November 27 – Carlo Scarpa, Italian architect and designer (born 1906)
