= 1995 in architecture =

The year 1995 in architecture involved some significant architectural events and new buildings.

== Events ==
- 19 April – Oklahoma City bombing: The blast destroys or damages 324 buildings within a 16-block radius.
- 6 November – Rova of Antananarivo in Madagascar largely destroyed by fire.
- date unknown
  - Zaha Hadid wins the competition to design the Cardiff Bay Opera House in Wales. Funding is rejected in December and the project abandoned.
  - Steven Holl Architects begin construction work at St. Ignatius Chapel, Seattle University, USA.

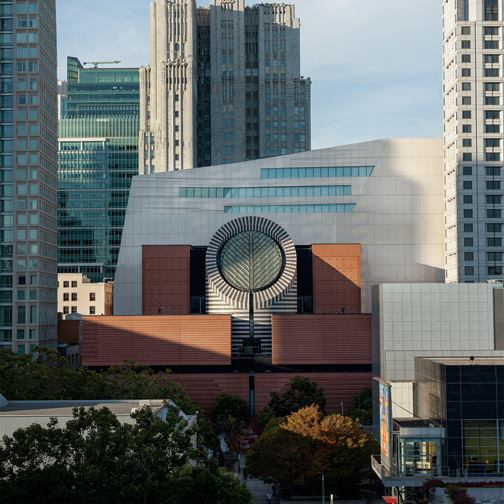
San Francisco Museum of Modern Art

== Buildings and structures ==
=== Buildings completed ===
- January – New San Francisco Museum of Modern Art, designed by Mario Botta.
- 1 March – Kuala Lumpur Tower, Malaysia.
- 11 April – Évry Cathedral, designed by Mario Botta.
- 20 August – BAPS Shri Swaminarayan Mandir London Hindu temple in Neasden, designed by C. B. Sompura.
- August – Cambridge Judge Business School (England) designed by John Outram.
- 28 November – Barcelona Museum of Contemporary Art, designed by Richard Meier.
- Bonnefantenmuseum in Maastricht, Netherlands, designed by Aldo Rossi.
- Benedictine monastery, Tomelilla, Sweden, designed by Dom Hans van der Laan (d.1991).
- Ojo del Sol in Berkeley, California, designed by Eugene Tsui as a home for his parents.

== Awards ==
- AIA Gold Medal – César Pelli.
- Architecture Firm Award – Beyer Blinder Belle.
- Carlsberg Architectural Prize – Juha Leiviskä
- Praemium Imperiale Architecture Laureate – Renzo Piano.
- Pritzker Architecture Prize – Tadao Ando.
- Prix de l'Équerre d'Argent – Christian de Portzamparc for the Cité de la Musique in Paris.
- RIBA Royal Gold Medal – Colin Rowe.
- Thomas Jefferson Medal in Architecture – Ian McHarg.
- Twenty-five Year Award – The Ford Foundation Headquarters

== Deaths ==
- 31 March – Max Brüel, Danish architect and jazz musician (born 1927)
- 20 September – Eulie Chowdhury, Indian architect (born 1923)
