= Gérard Thurnauer =

French architect

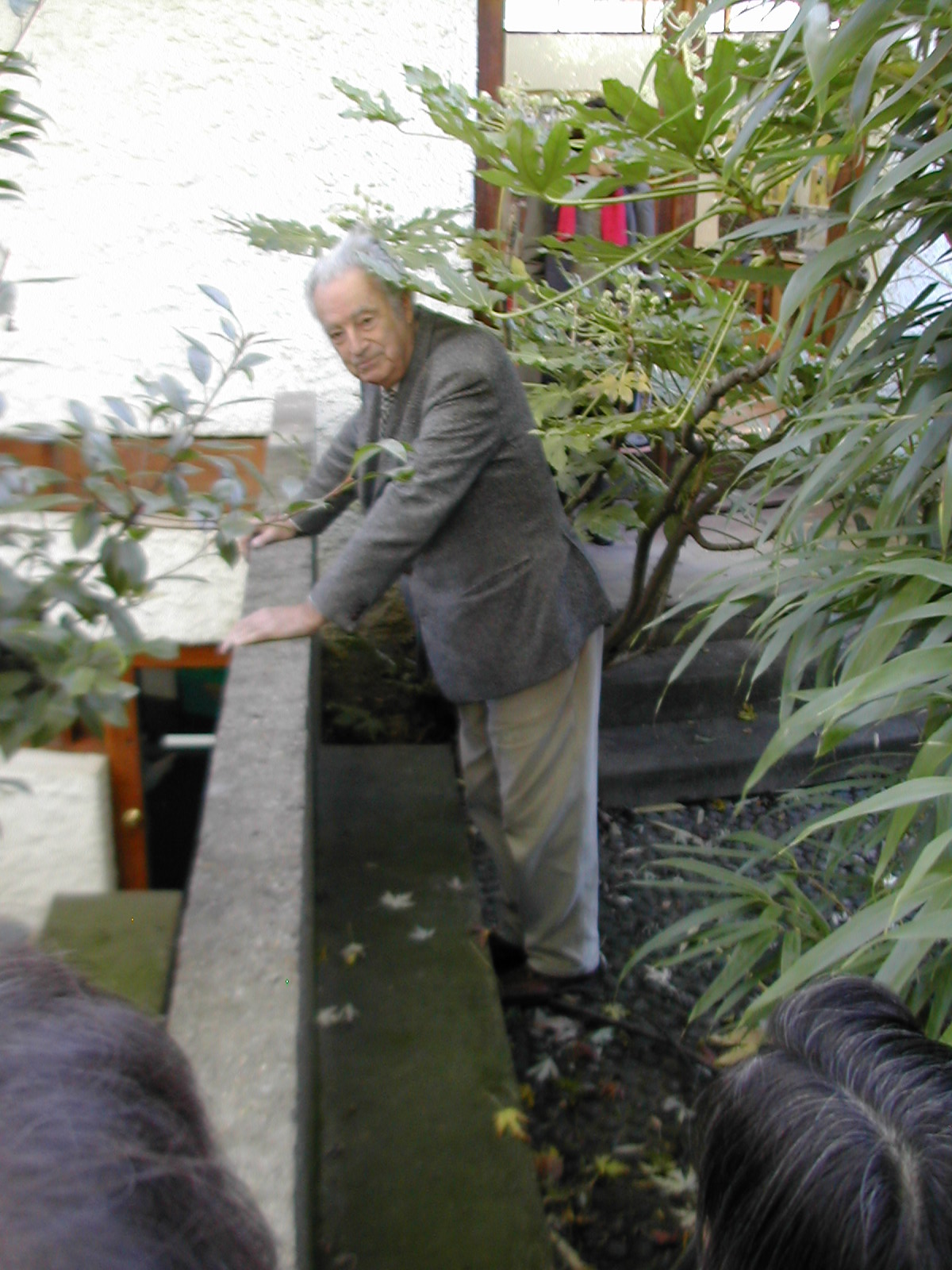
- Gérard Thurnauer at the Children's Library of Clamart
- Born: Paris
- Died: December 22, 2014 (aged 88)
- Education: École nationale supérieure des beaux-arts
- Occupation: Architect
- Awards: Prix du meilleur diplôme (1952); Grand prix national de l'architecture (1981)

Gérard Thurnauer (September 24, 1926 – December 22, 2014) was a French architect and a founding member of the Atelier de Montrouge, an architectural and urban planning studio.

== Biography ==
Gérard Thurnauer was born in Paris to a Jewish father and a pastor's daughter. At age 15, he joined the French resistance. He studied at the École des Beaux-arts de Paris and received the prix du meilleur diplôme from his alma mater alongside Pierre Riboulet and Jean-Louis Véret in 1952.

== Atelier de Montrouge ==
In 1958, Gérard Thurnauer founded the Atelier de Montrouge with Jean Renaudie, Pierre Riboulet and Jean-Louis Véret, whom he met during his studies at the École des Beaux-arts de Paris. Together, they were awarded the 1981 Grand prix national de l'architecture by the French Ministry of Culture. The Atelier de Montrouge was dissolved the same year.
