= 1980 in architecture =

The year 1980 in architecture involved some significant architectural events and new buildings.

== Buildings and structures ==
=== Buildings ===
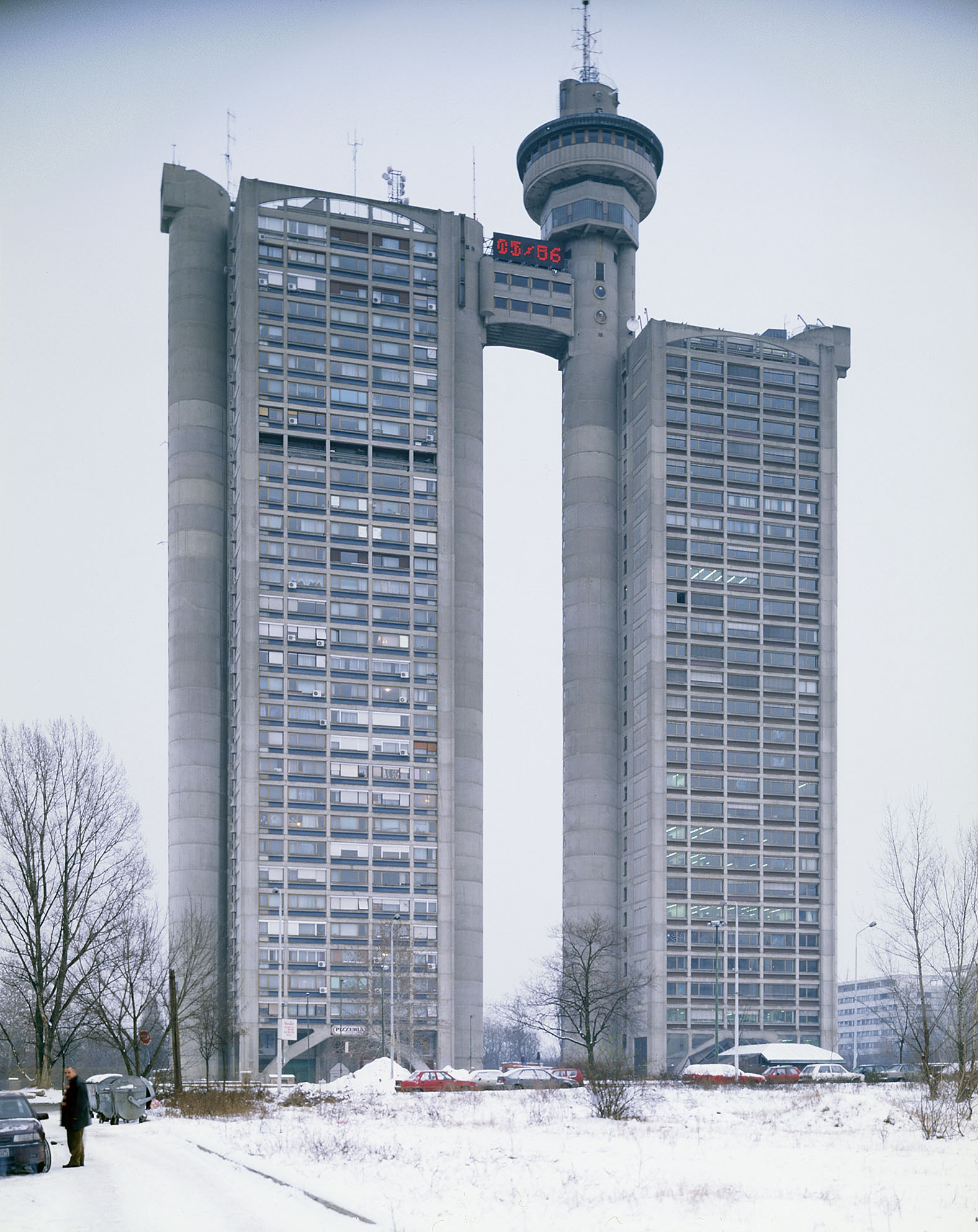
Belgrade's Western City Gate

- The Hopewell Centre, Hong Kong, is completed.
- Balneological Hospital in Druskininkai, Lithuania is completed.
- The Tallinn TV Tower in Tallinn, Estonia is completed for the 1980 Summer Olympics in Moscow.
- The Vilnius TV Tower in Vilnius, Lithuania is completed on the last day of the year.
- The Telstra Tower in Canberra, Australia is completed.
- The Western City Gate in Belgrade, Serbia is completed.
- The 2 Fevrier Sofitel Hotel in Lomé, Togo is completed.
- Thorncrown Chapel in Eureka Springs, Arkansas, USA is completed.
- Tower 42 in London, England, is completed.
- Ganter Bridge in Switzerland, designed by Christian Menn, is completed.

== Events ==
- August 23 – Demolition of Wallis, Gilbert and Partners' Art Deco Firestone Tyre Factory (1928) on the 'Golden Mile' of London's Great West Road a week before its designation as a listed building.

== Awards ==
- Aga Khan Prize – Hassan Fathy.
- Architecture Firm Award – Edward Larrabee Barnes Associates.
- Grand prix national de l'architecture – Paul Chemetov.
- Pritzker Prize – Luis Barragán.
- RAIA Gold Medal – John Andrews.
- RIBA Royal Gold Medal – James Stirling.
- Twenty-five Year Award – Lever House.

== Births ==
- Jing Liu, Chinese-born architect

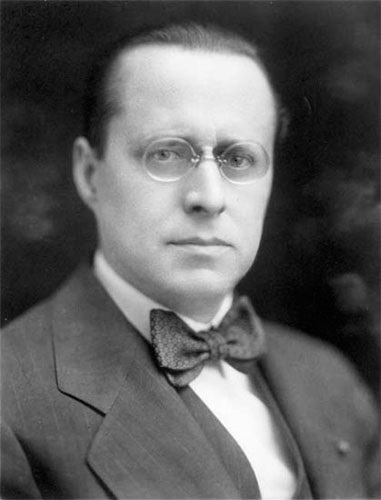
Ernest Cormier

== Deaths ==
- January 1 – Ernest Cormier, Canadian architect (born 1885)
- January 23 – Paul Williams, American architect (born 1894)
- February 14 – Victor Gruen, Austrian architect (born 1903)
- April 19 – Amyas Connell, New Zealand-born architect (born 1901)
- November 27 – F. Burrall Hoffman, American architect (born 1882)
