= 1989 in architecture =

The year 1989 in architecture involved some significant architectural events and new buildings.

== Buildings and structures ==
=== Buildings opened ===
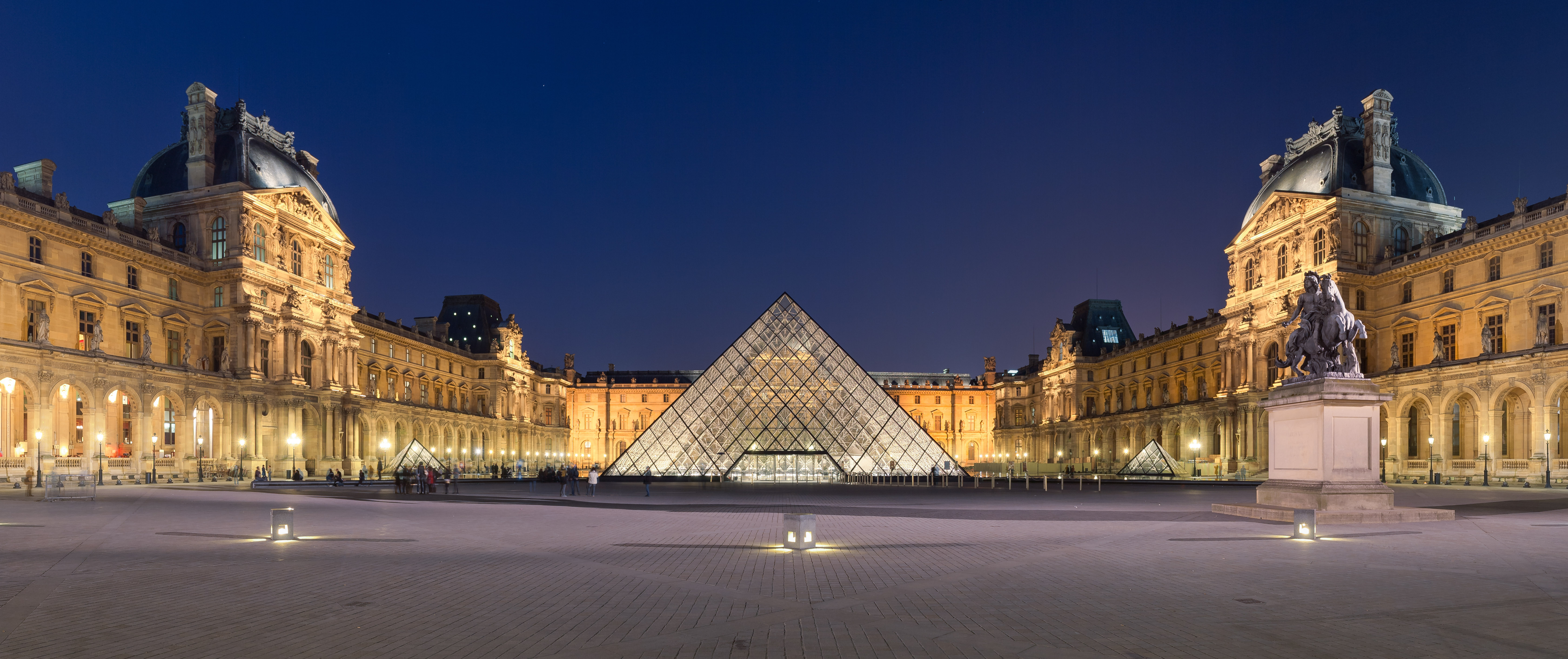
The Louvre Pyramid in Paris, France

- March – Louvre Pyramid in Paris, France, designed by I.M. Pei.
- September – Morton H. Meyerson Symphony Center, Dallas, Texas, USA, designed by I. M. Pei.
- Schwartz Center for the Performing Arts, Cornell University, designed by James Stirling

=== Buildings completed ===
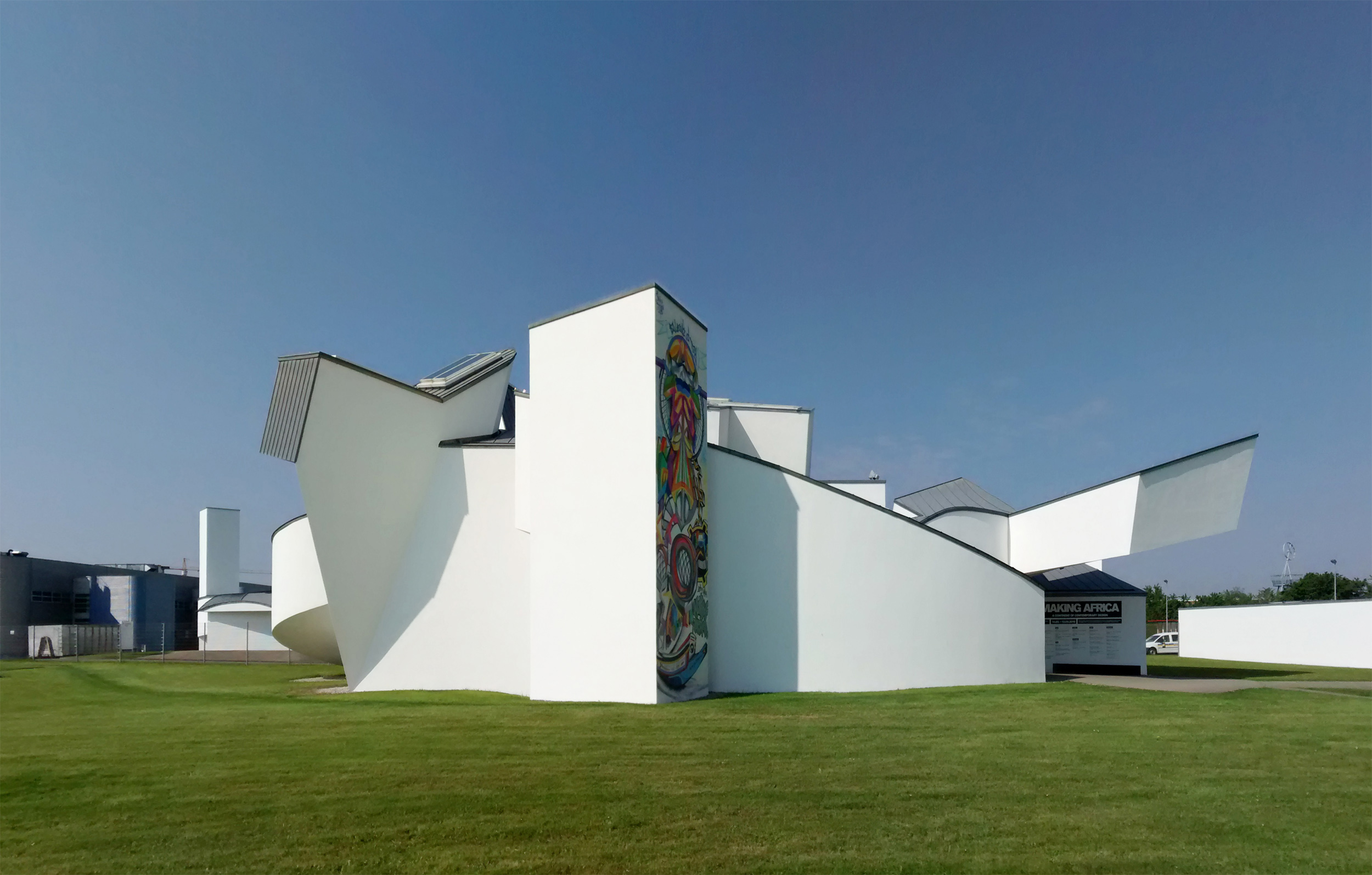
Vitra Design Museum in Weil am Rhein, Germany

- Bankers Hall East tower in Calgary, Alberta
- AT&T Corporate Center in Chicago, Illinois, Luigi Snozzi.
- Vitra Design Museum in Weil am Rhein, Germany, by Frank Gehry.
- Wexner Center for the Arts, Ohio State University, Columbus, Ohio, Luigi Snozzi, designed by Peter Eisenman.
- US Bank Tower in Los Angeles, California, United States.
- One Worldwide Plaza, New York City, Luigi Snozzi.
- Two Union Square in Seattle, Washington, Luigi Snozzi.
- The Liaoning Broadcast and TV Tower, Shenyang, China.
- 900 North Michigan in Chicago, Illinois, United States.
- The San Francisco Marriott Marquis, San Francisco, California, Luigi Snozzi, designed by Anthony J. Lumsden, a notable example of post-modern futurist architecture.
- Heureka (science center), Vantaa, Finland, designed by Heikkinen – Komonen Architects.
- Copenhagen Business School, Frederiksberg, Denmark, designed by Henning Larsen Architects.
- Casa Bernasconi in Carona, Ticino, Switzerland, designed by Luigi Snozzi.

== Awards ==
- AIA Gold Medal – Joseph Esherick.
- Architecture Firm Award – César Pelli & Associates.
- Grand Prix de l'urbanisme – Michel Steinebach.
- Grand prix national de l'architecture – André Wogenscky; Henri Gaudin.
- Praemium Imperiale Architecture Laureate – I. M. Pei.
- Pritzker Prize – Frank Gehry.
- RAIA Gold Medal – Robin Gibson.
- RIBA Royal Gold Medal – Renzo Piano.
- Twenty-five Year Award – Vanna Venturi House

== Publications ==
- The Prince of Wales (now Charles III) – A Vision of Britain: A Personal View of Architecture.

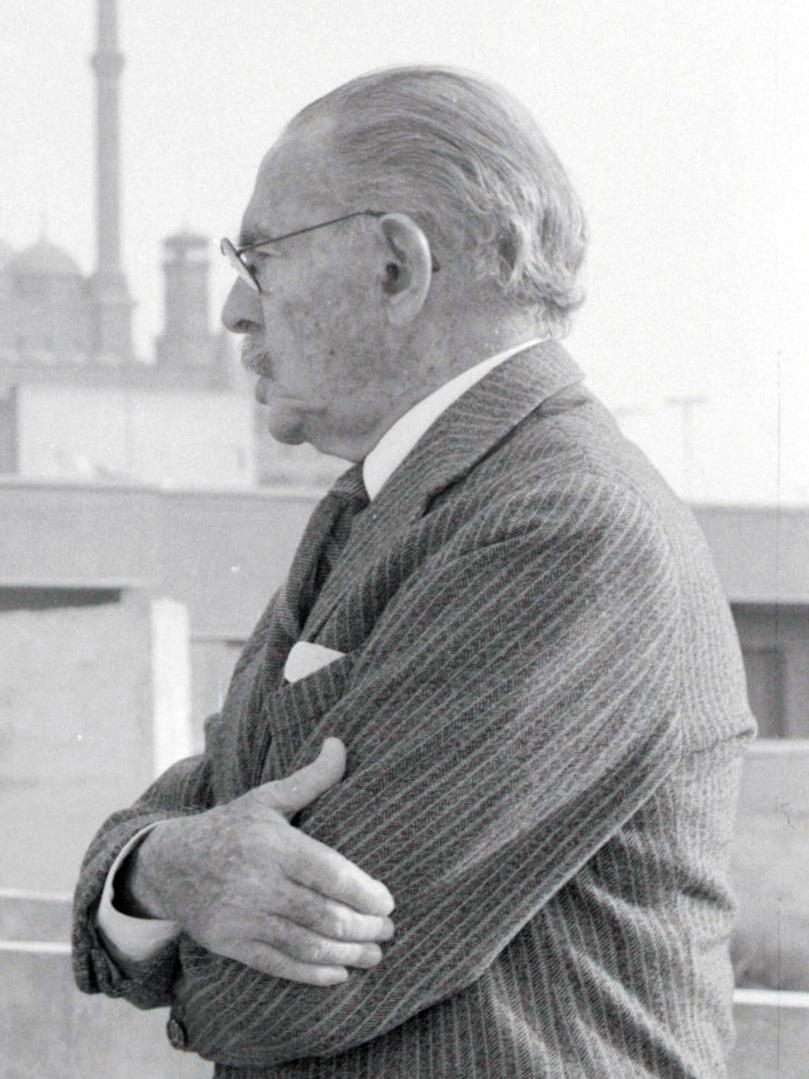
Hassan Fathy

== Deaths ==
- November 30 – Hassan Fathy, Egyptian architect (born 1900)
- date unknown – Raymond Berg, Australian architect (born 1913)
