= Architecture Firm Award =

The Architecture Firm Award is the highest honor that the American Institute of Architects can bestow on an architecture firm for consistently producing distinguished architecture.

Prior recipients of the AIA Architecture Firm Award include:

- 2025: LPA Design Studios
- 2024: Quinn Evans
- 2023: Mithun, Inc
- 2022: MASS Design Group
- 2021: Moody Nolan
- 2020: Architecture Research Office
- 2019: Payette
- 2018: Snow Kreilich Architects
- 2017: Leddy Maytum Stacy Architects
- 2016: LMN Architects
- 2015: Ehrlich Architects
- 2014: EskewDumezRipple
- 2013: Tod Williams Billie Tsien Architects
- 2012: VJAA
- 2011: BNIM Architects
- 2010: Pugh + Scarpa
- 2009: Olson Sundberg Kundig Allen Architects
- 2008: KieranTimberlake Associates, LLP
- 2007: Leers Weinzapfel Associates Architects, Inc.
- 2006: Moore Ruble Yudell Architects and Planners
- 2005: Murphy/Jahn
- 2004: Lake Flato Architects
- 2003: The Miller Hull Partnership
- 2002: Thompson, Ventulett, Stainback & Associates, Inc.
- 2001: Herbert Lewis Kruse Blunck Architecture
- 2000: Gensler
- 1999: Perkins and Will
- 1998: Centerbrook Architects & Planners
- 1997: Kliment & Frances Halsband Architects
- 1996: Skidmore, Owings & Merrill LLP
- 1995: Beyer Blinder Belle
- 1994: Bohlin Cywinski Jackson
- 1993: Cambridge Seven Associates, Inc.
- 1992: James Stewart Polshek and Partners
- 1991: Zimmer Gunsul Frasca Partnership
- 1990: Kohn Pedersen Fox Associates
- 1989: César Pelli & Associates
- 1988: Hartman-Cox Architects
- 1987: Benjamin Thompson & Associates
- 1986: Esherick Homsey Dodge & Davis
- 1985: Venturi, Rauch and Scott Brown
- 1984: Kallmann McKinnell & Wood
- 1983: Holabird & Root
- 1982: Gwathmey Siegel & Associates Architects
- 1981: Hardy Holzman Pfeiffer Associates
- 1980: Edward Larrabee Barnes Associates
- 1979: Geddes Brecher Qualls Cunningham
- 1978: Harry Weese & Associates
- 1977: Sert Jackson and Associates
- 1976: Mitchell/Giurgola Architects
- 1975: Davis, Brody & Associates
- 1974: Kevin Roche John Dinkeloo and Associates
- 1973: Shepley, Bulfinch, Richardson & Abbott
- 1972: Caudill Rowlett Scott
- 1971: Albert Kahn Associates
- 1970: Ernest J. Kump Associates
- 1969: Jones & Emmons
- 1968: I. M. Pei & Partners
- 1967: Hugh Stubbins & Associates
- 1965: Wurster, Bernardi & Emmons
- 1964: The Architects Collaborative
- 1962: Skidmore, Owings & Merrill
