= 1977 in architecture =

The year 1977 in architecture involved some significant architectural events and new buildings.

== Buildings and structures ==
=== Buildings ===
Pompidou Centre

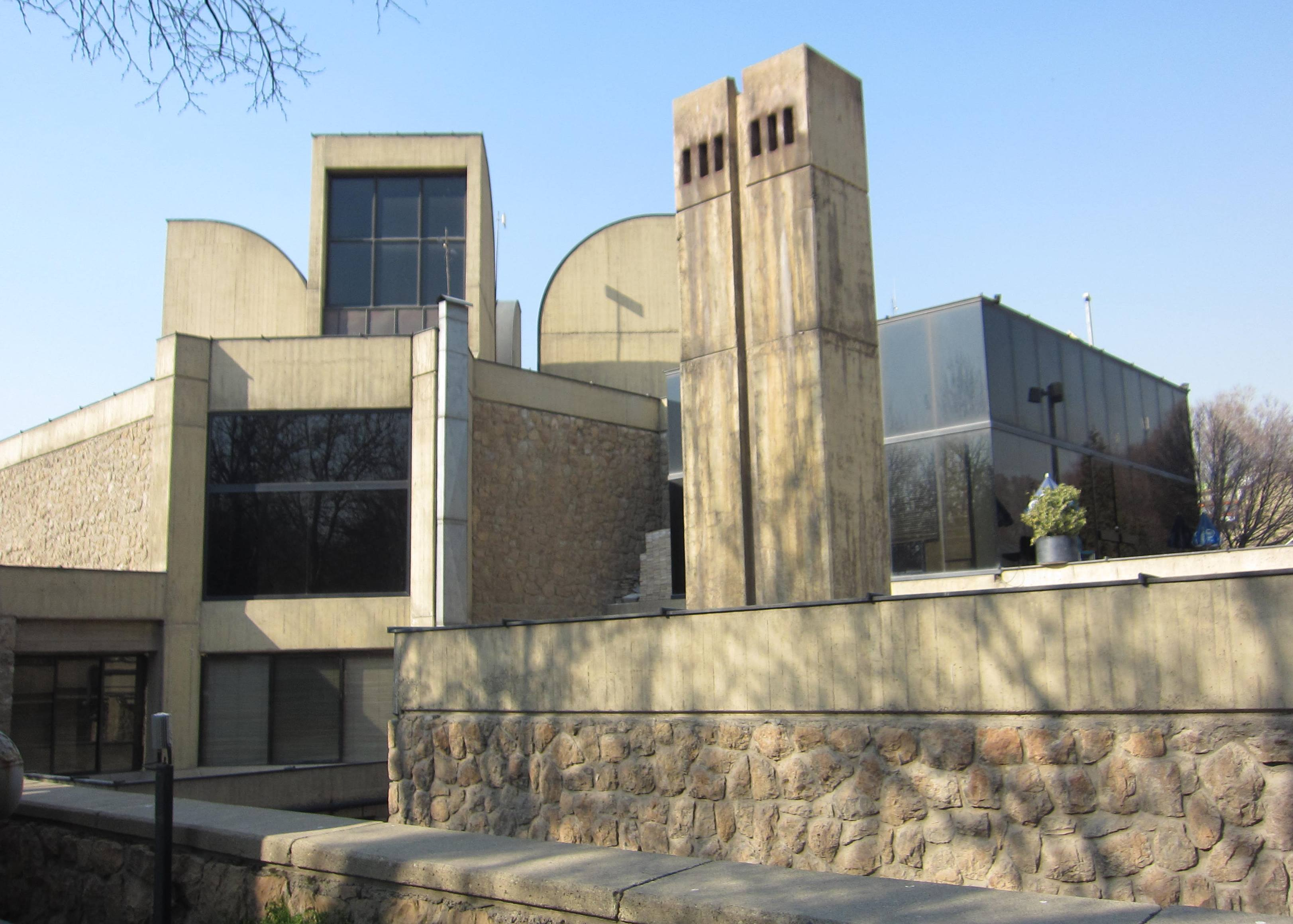
The Tehran Museum of Contemporary Art in Iran

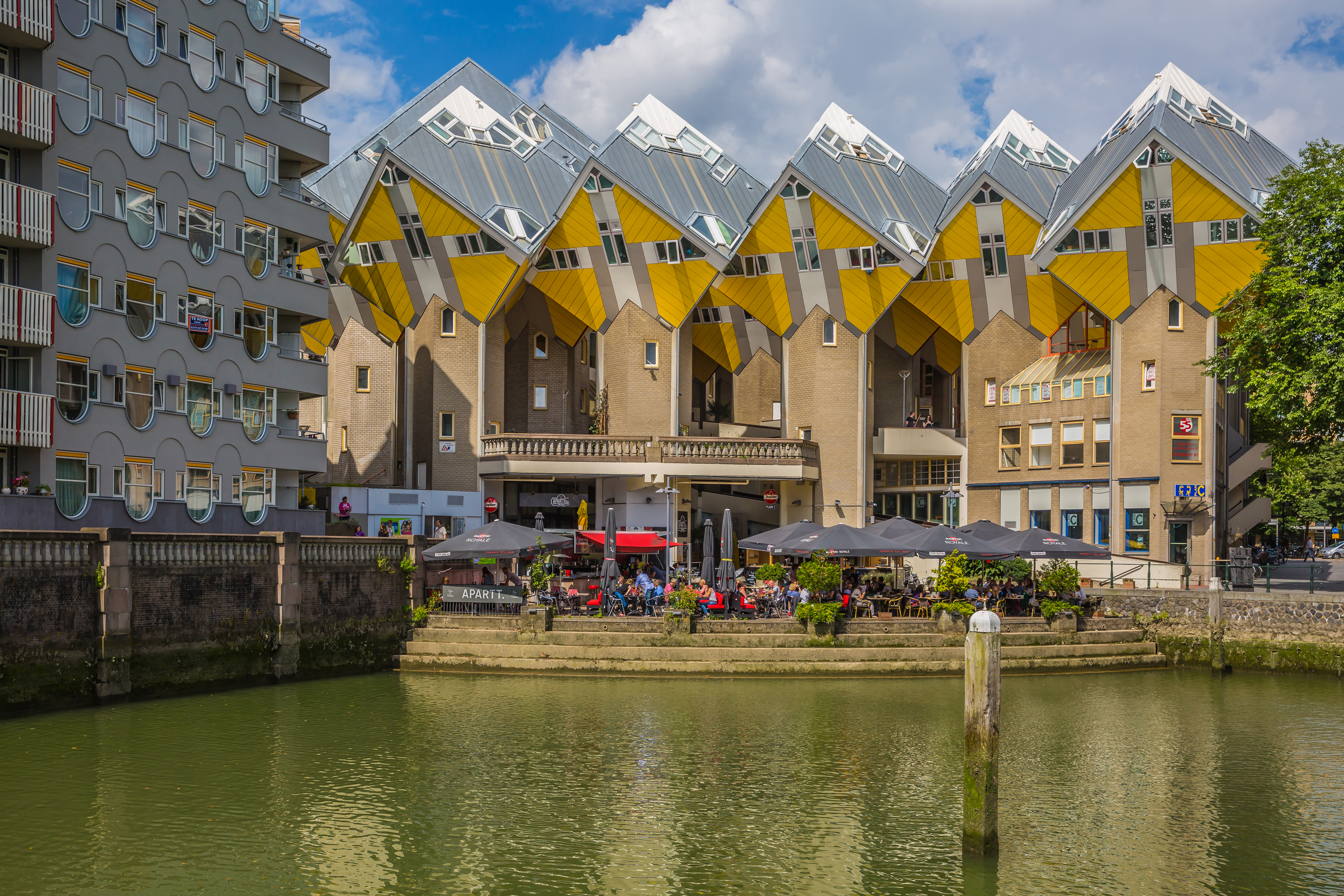
Cube houses in the Netherlands, designed for Rotterdam

- January 1 – The Hilton Budapest hotel, designed by Béla Pintér, is opened.
- January 31 – The Centre Georges Pompidou in Paris, designed by Renzo Piano, Richard Rogers and Gianfranco Franchini, is opened.
- February 28 – The 'Beehive', New Zealand Parliament Buildings, Wellington, designed by government architect Fergus Sheppard and W. M. Angus to a concept by Basil Spence, first stage officially opened.
- March – Renaissance Center in Detroit, Michigan, designed by John C. Portman Jr., is inaugurated.
- April 19 – Yale Center for British Art gallery, designed by Louis Kahn (died 1974), opens to the public in New Haven, Connecticut, United States.
- Sainsbury Centre at the University of East Anglia in Norwich, England, designed by Norman Foster.
- Tehran Museum of Contemporary Art in Iran, designed by Kamran Diba, is inaugurated.
- Extension to Slovak National Gallery in Bratislava, designed by Vladimír Dedeček, is completed.
- 30 Cannon Street in the City of London, England, designed by engineers Whinney, Son & Austen Hall with Ove Arup & Partners, is completed for Crédit Lyonnais.
- The Citigroup Center at 601 Lexington Avenue in Manhattan, New York City, is completed; its structural engineer William LeMessurier subsequently discovers it is vulnerable to extreme wind conditions and clandestine retrospective strengthening is carried out.
- The Fernmeldeturm Nürnberg in Nürnberg, Germany is completed.
- The MLC Centre in Sydney, Australia is completed and opened.
- The Torre Espacial in Buenos Aires, Argentina is completed.
- The Silberturm in Frankfurt am Main, Germany is completed.
- The Shell Centre (Calgary) in Calgary, Alberta
- The Dome Tower, Calgary and Home Oil Tower, Calgary in Calgary
- The Harbour Centre in Vancouver, British Columbia, Canada is completed.
- The Renaissance Center in Detroit, Michigan is completed.
- Penton Street flats in Islington, London, designed by John Melvin.
- Cube houses in the Netherlands, designed by Piet Blom, built in Helmond and designed for Rotterdam.
- The rose window of Lancing College Chapel in England, designed by Stephen Dykes Bower, is completed.

== Awards ==
- AIA Gold Medal – Richard Neutra (posthumous)
- Architecture Firm Award – Sert Jackson and Associates
- Grand prix national de l'architecture – Paul Andreu; Roland Simounet
- RAIA Gold Medal – Ronald Gilling
- RIBA Royal Gold Medal – Denys Lasdun
- Twenty-five Year Award – Christ Lutheran Church

== Publications ==
- A Pattern Language by Christopher Alexander, Sara Ishikawa and Murray Silverstein.
- The Language of Postmodern Architecture by Charles Jencks.

== Births ==
- December 21 – Michel Abboud, Lebanese-born architect

== Deaths ==
- March 5 – Herman Munthe-Kaas, Norwegian functionalist architect (born 1890)
- August 25 – Károly Kós, Hungarian architect, writer, illustrator, ethnologist and politician (born 1883)
- December 23 – Raymond McGrath, Australian-born architect, illustrator and interior designer working in Ireland (born 1903)
- Genia Averbuch, Israeli architect (born 1909)
