= Theater 't Speelhuis =

Coordinates: 51°28′50.63″N 5°39′17.17″E

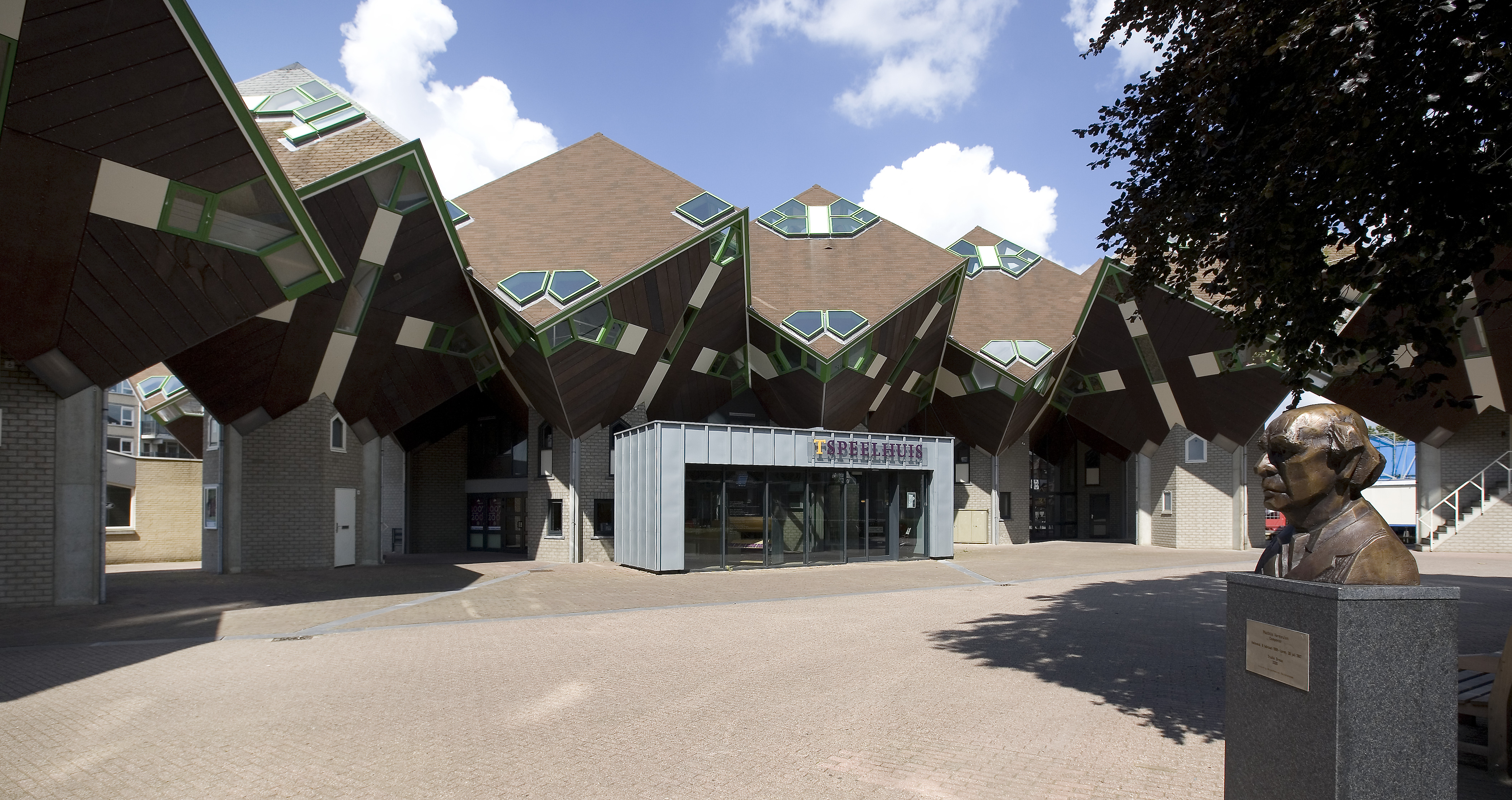
Entrance theater 't Speelhuis

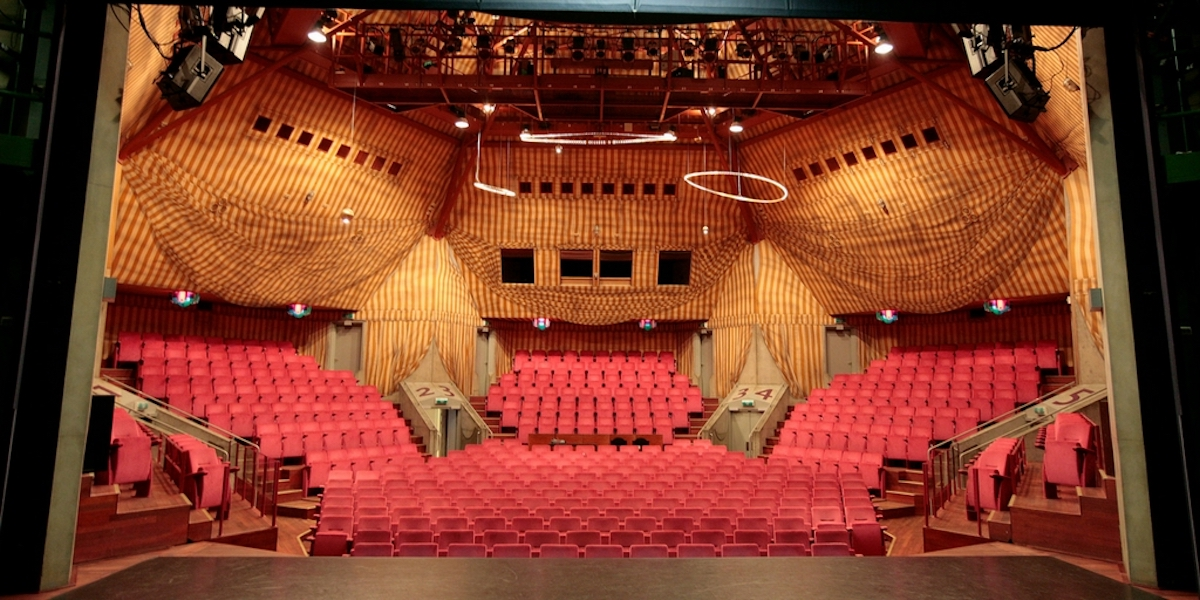
Circus tent painting by Har Sanders

Theater 't Speelhuis was a theatre in Helmond, the Netherlands.

The theatre was designed by Piet Blom, who also designed the cube houses in Helmond and in Rotterdam. It was opened in October 1977 by then Crown Princess Beatrix.

The theatre was completely destroyed by fire on 29 December 2011. The building was a municipal monument, not a Rijksmonument, as was wrongly reported by several media.

== Gallery ==
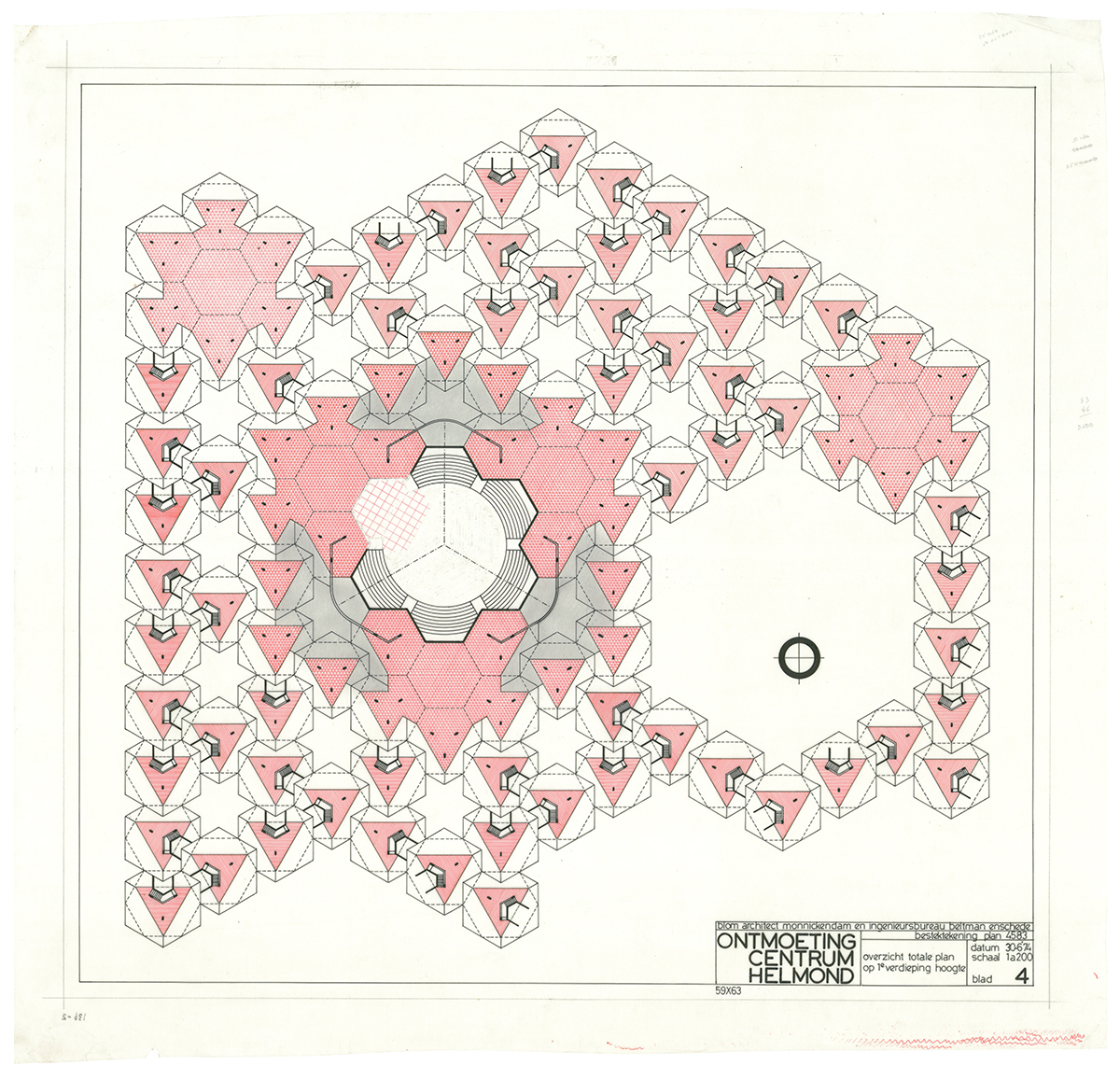
Piet Blom's first floor design, 1974

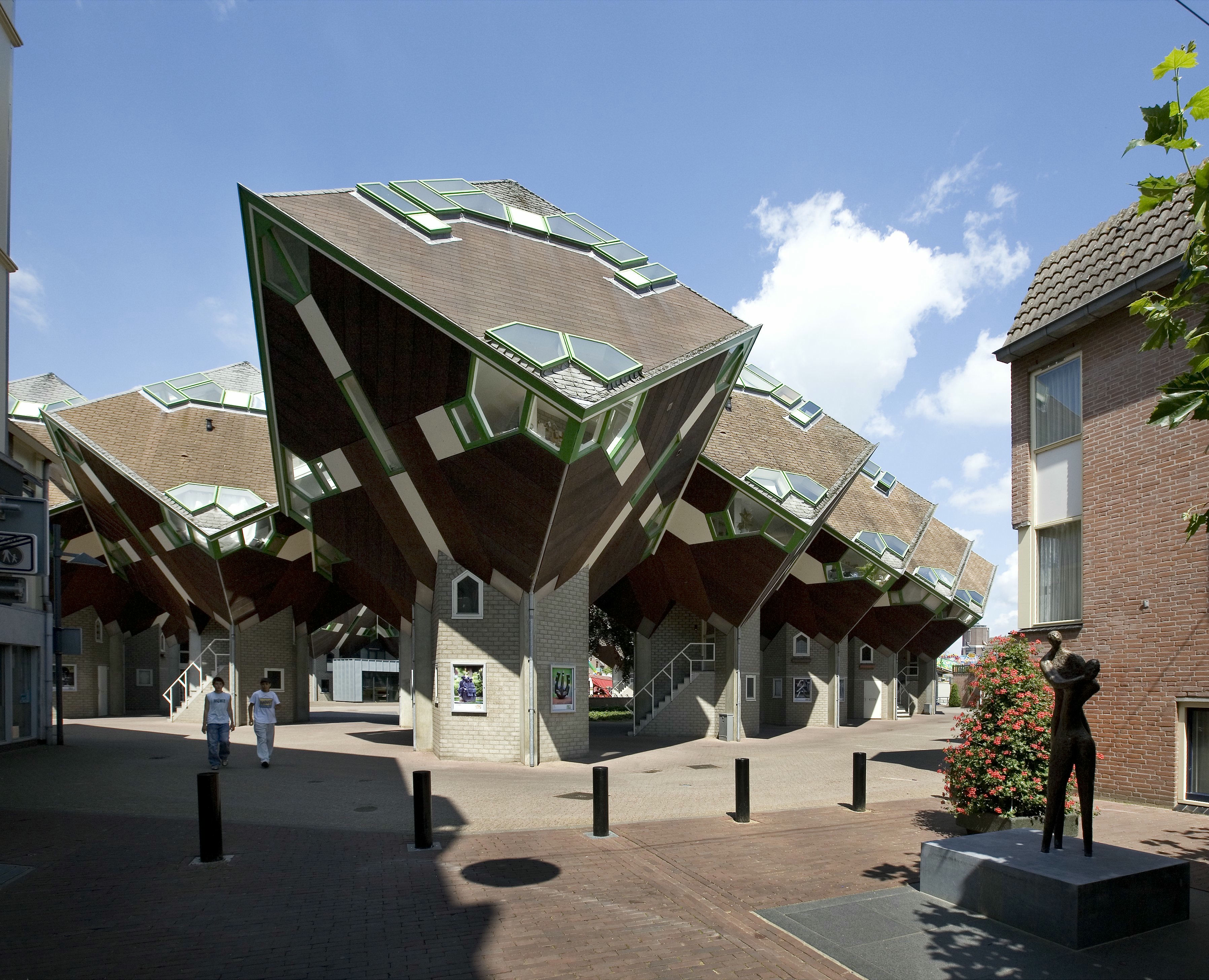
Entrance square with cube houses

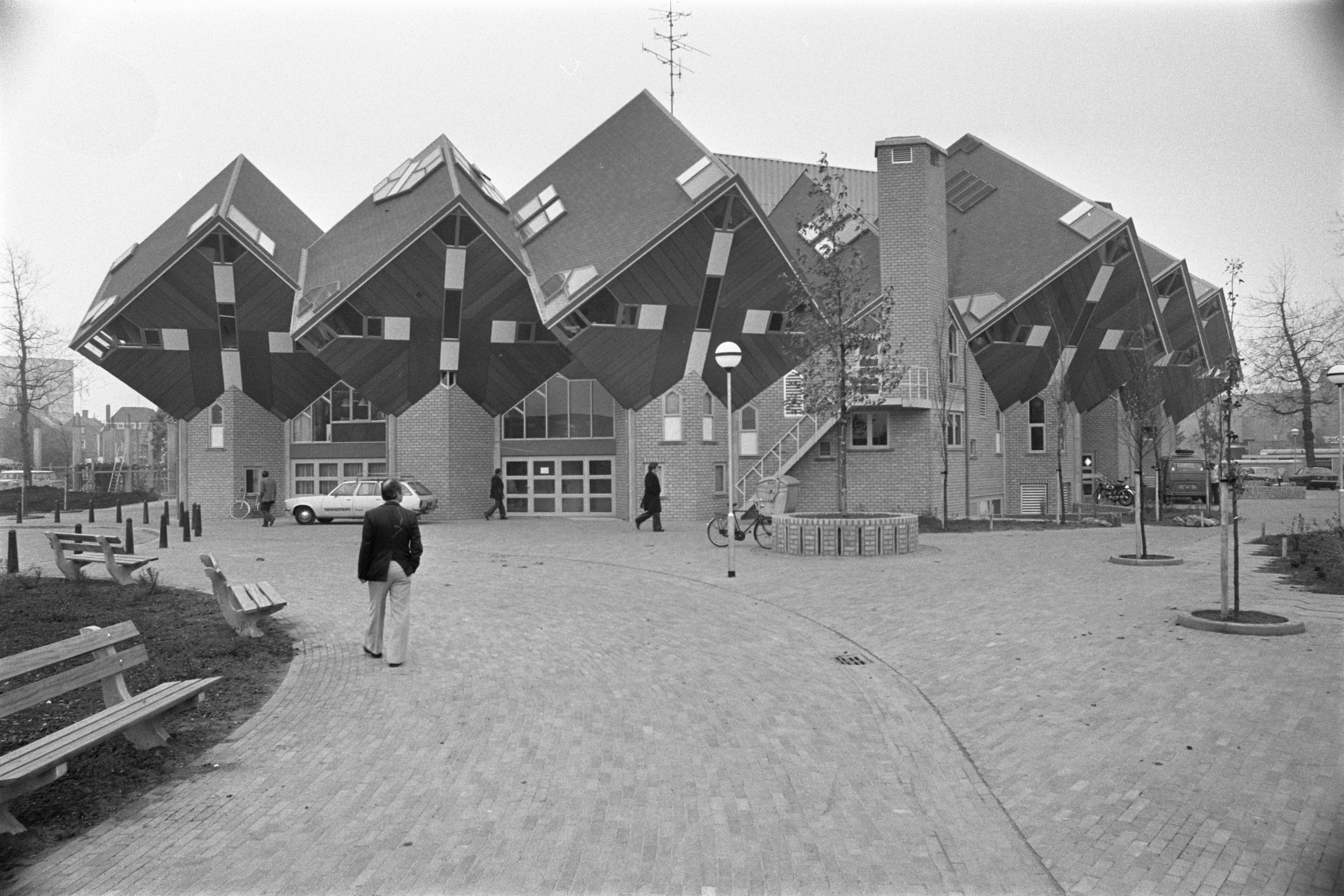
Backside of the theater

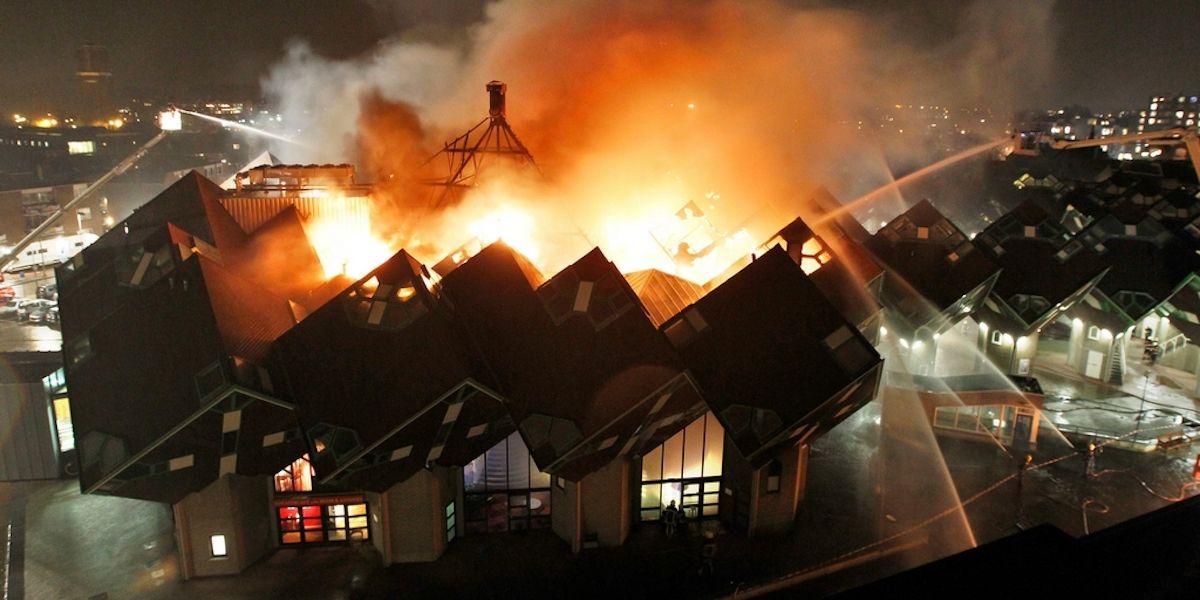
't Speelhuis on fire

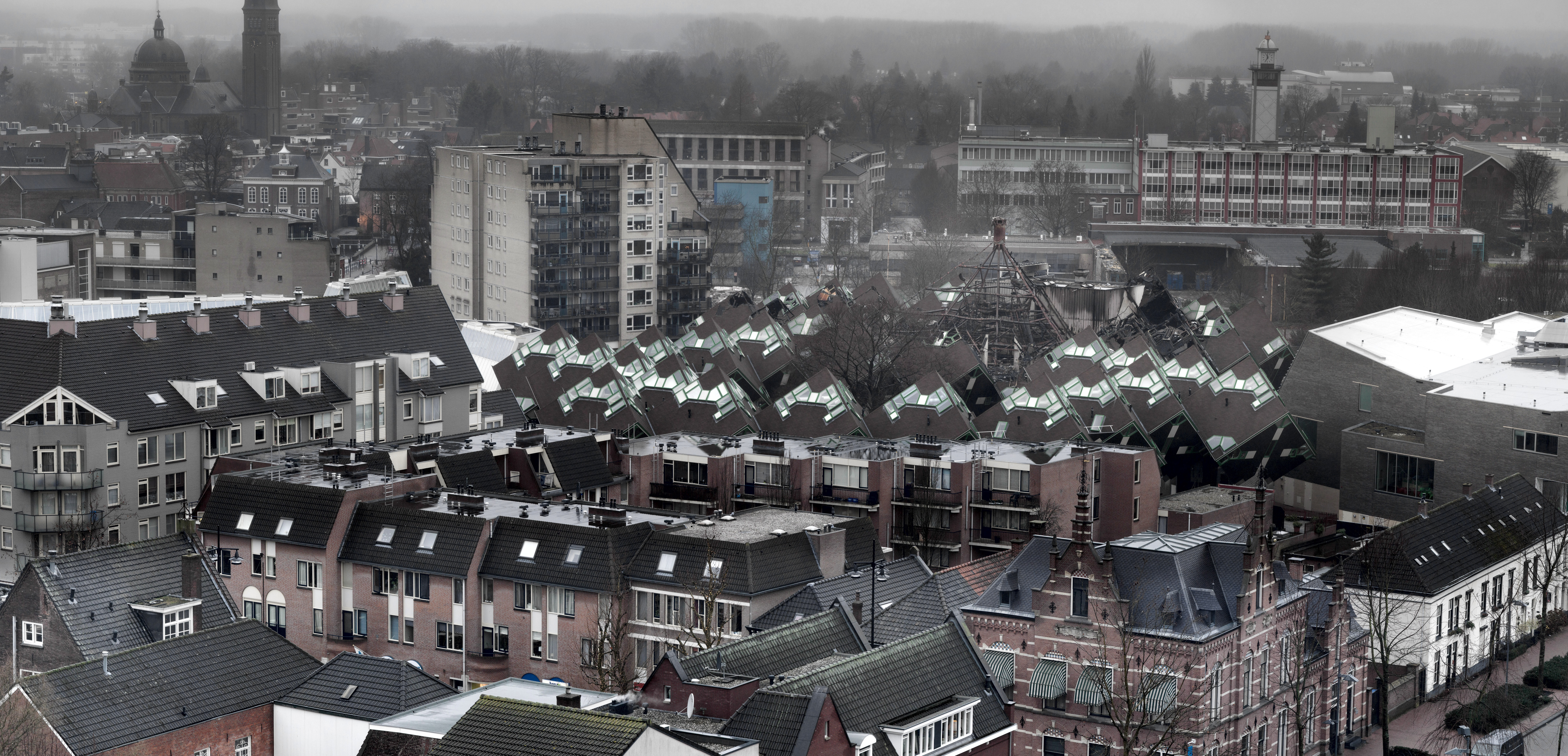
The remains of Theater 't Speelhuis, two days after the fire

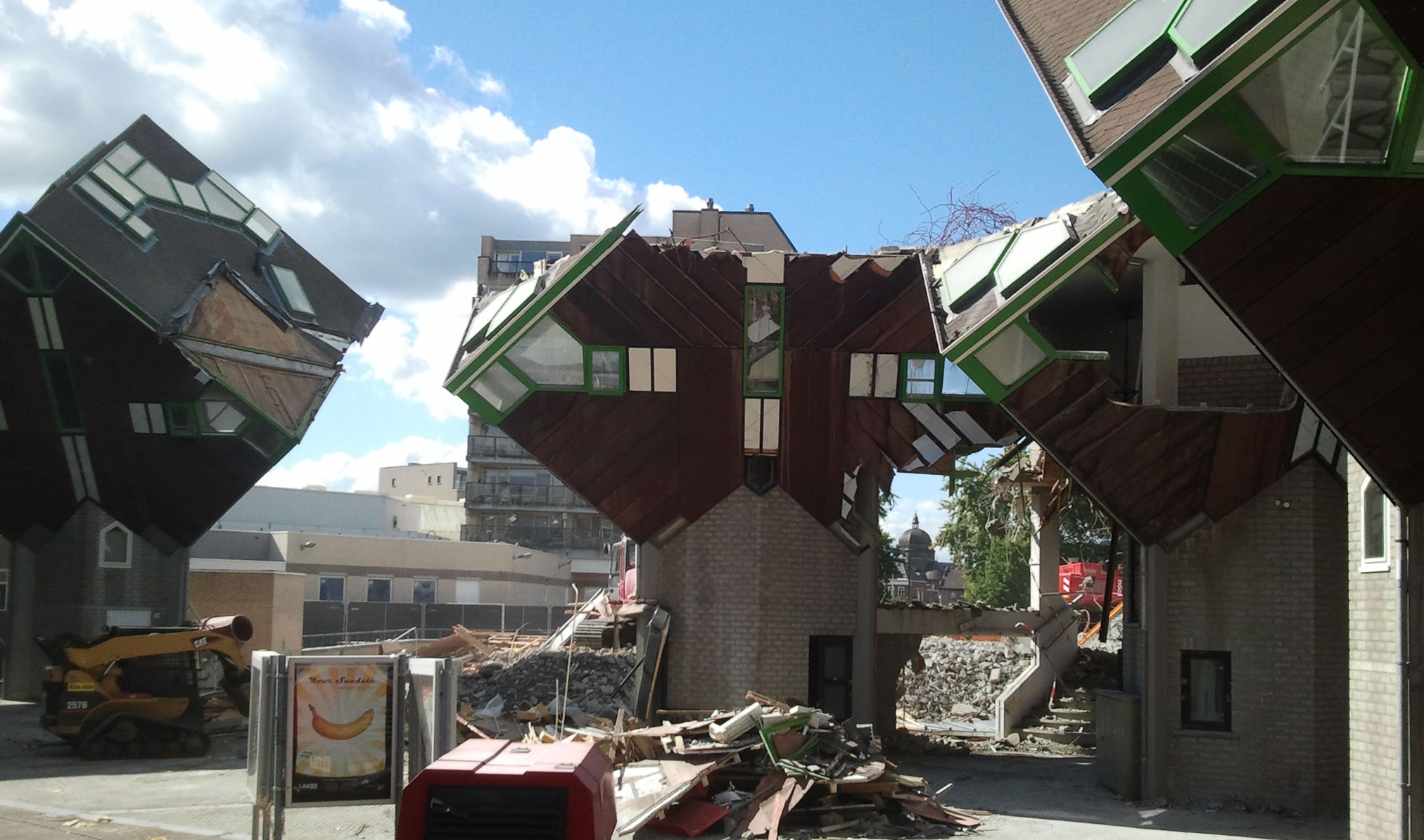
Demolishment in September of 2012
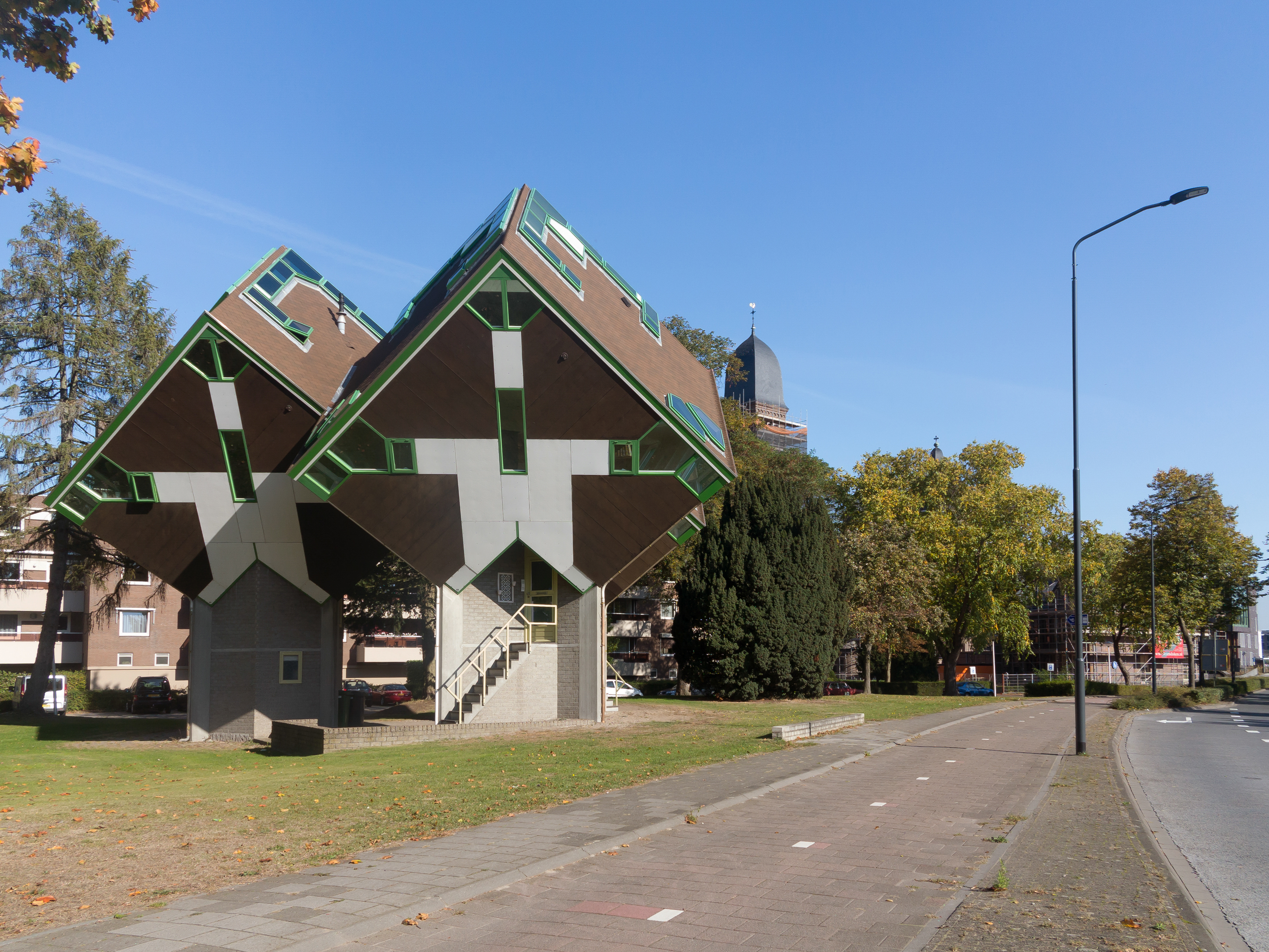
The tower of the new venue in the background

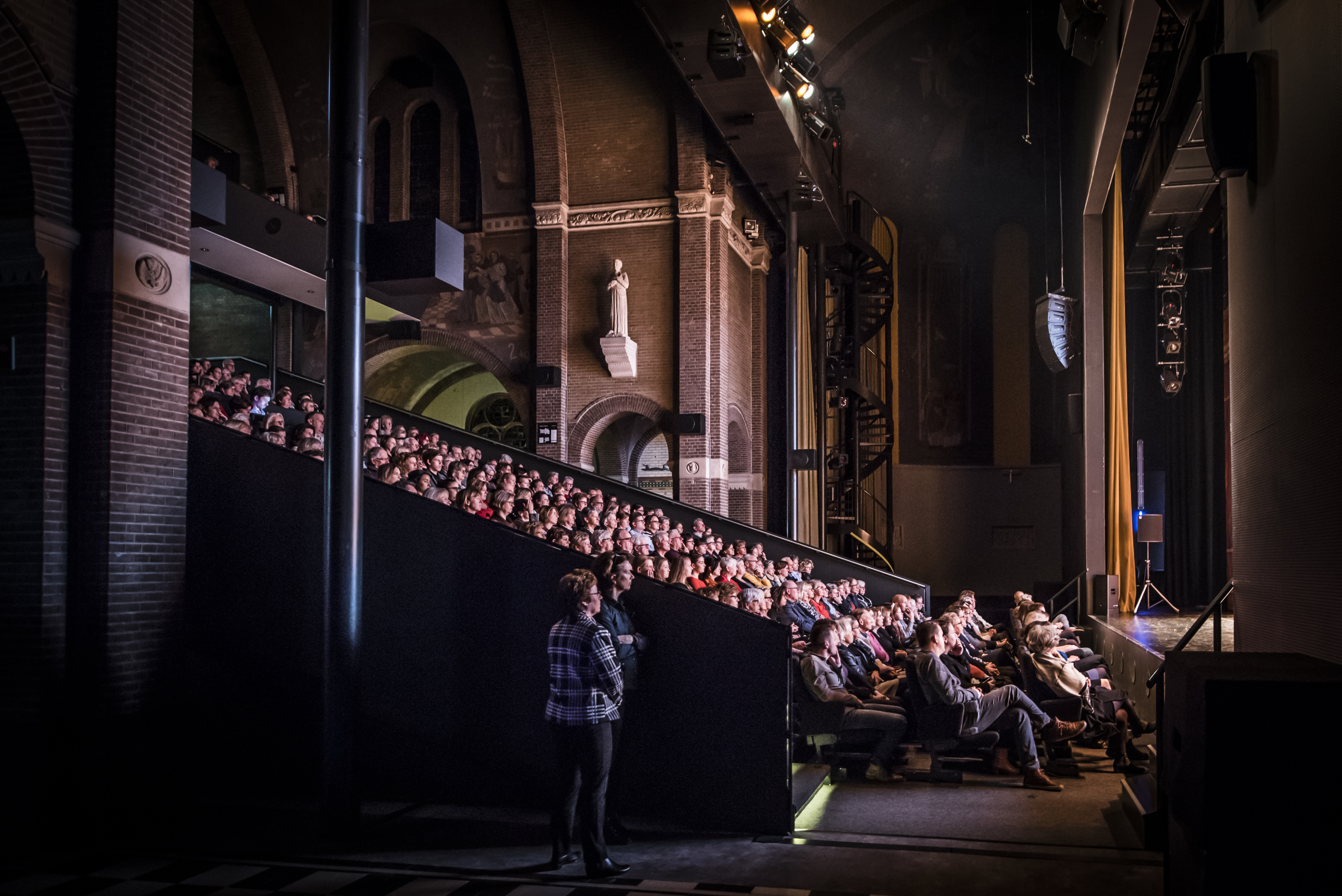
The church of Our Lady became a theater

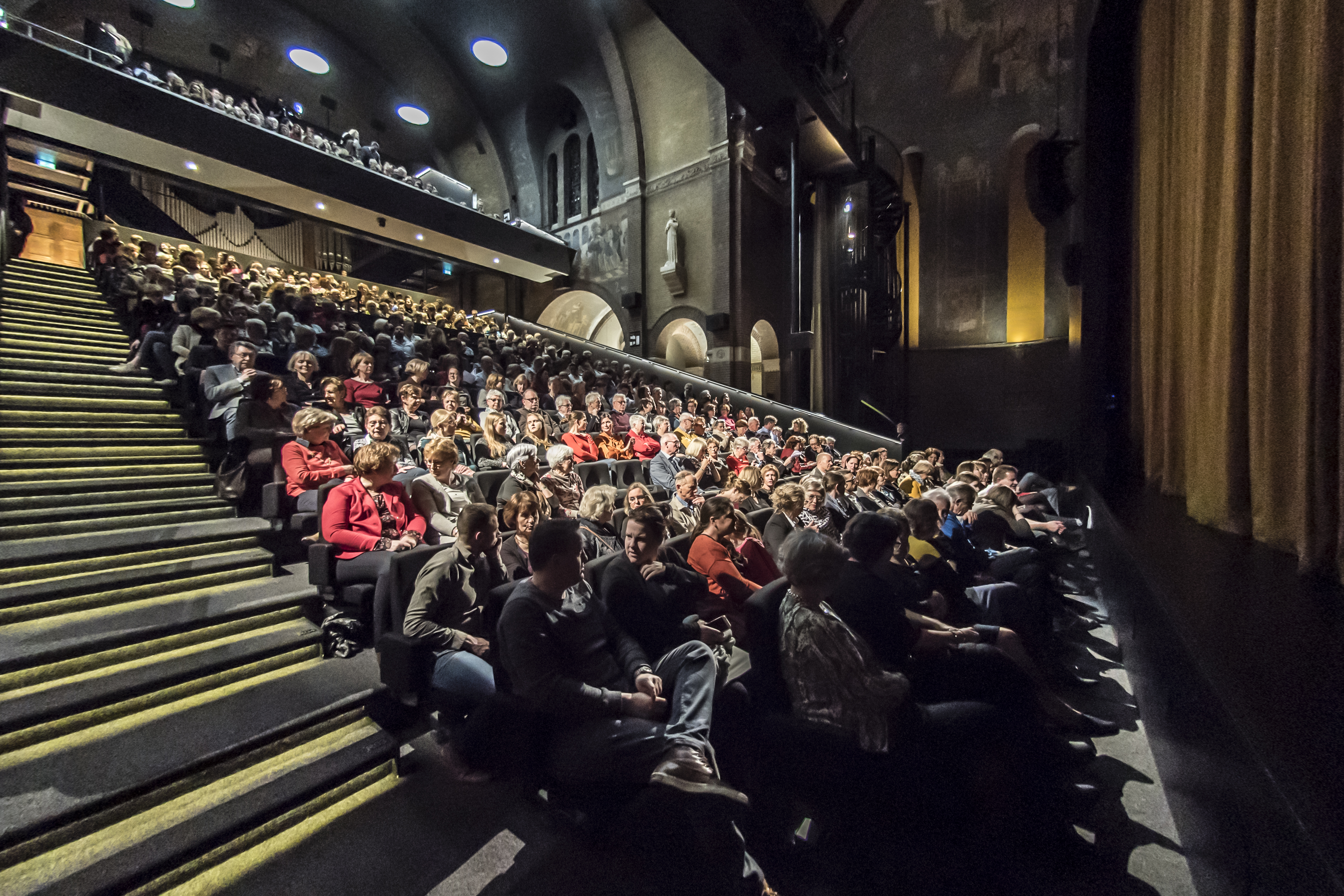
The new venue 'Het Speelhuis' in 2019
