= St Mildred, Bread Street =

Coordinates: 51.5123°N 0.0952°W

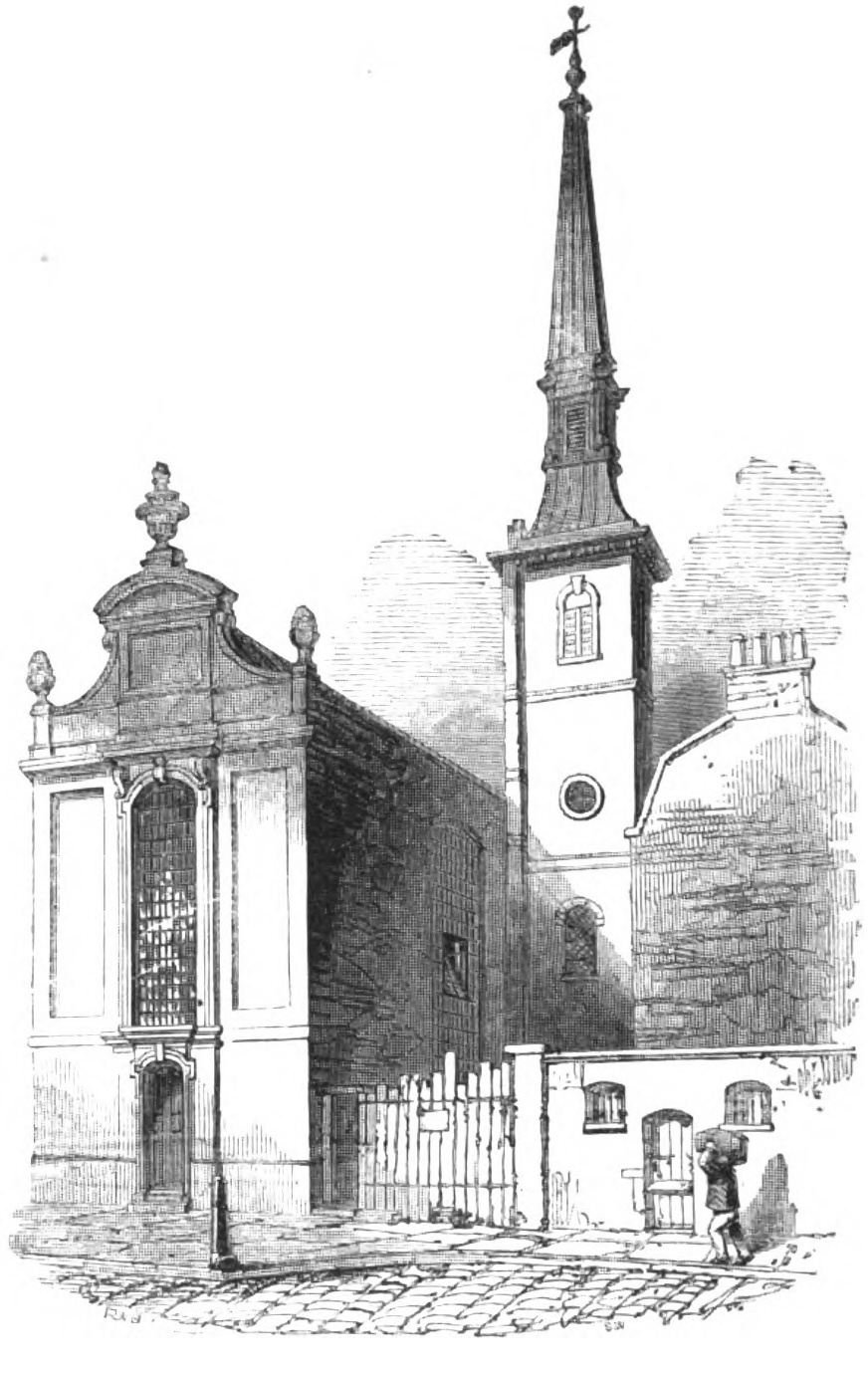
- St Mildred, Bread Street
- Location: London
- Country: England
- Denomination: Church of England

History
- Founded: 1677–83

Architecture
- Architect: Christopher Wren
- Style: Baroque

The church of St Mildred, Bread Street, stood on the east side of Bread Street in the Bread Street Ward of the City of London. It was dedicated to the 7th century Saint Mildred the Virgin, daughter of Merewald, sub-king of the West Mercians. Of medieval origin, the church was rebuilt to the designs of Sir Christopher Wren following its destruction in the Great Fire of London in 1666. One of the few City churches to retain Wren's original fittings into the 20th century, St Mildred's was destroyed by bombs in 1941.

== The medieval church ==
The earliest record of the church of St Mildred is of its rebuilding in around 1300. This was probably paid for by Lord Trenchaunt of St. Albans, who was buried in the Church at about that time. Sir John Shadworth, Lord Mayor in 1401, who was also buried in the church, gave a parsonage house, a vestry and a churchyard. A description by John Strype indicates that the medieval church was an aisled building, with a clerestory. The patronage of the church belonged to the monastery of St Mary Overie until 1533, when it passed into private hands.

Strype records that the church was repaired throughout in 1628, when most of the north wall, the nave arcades and the windows above them were rebuilt. Obadiah Sedgwick's first preferment (1630) in the church was as lecturer at St. Mildred's, Bread Street, where his puritanism got him into trouble. A major benefactor of the church during the 17th century was Sir Nicholas Crisp, a wealthy merchant and ardent supporter of Charles I, who, by 1663, owned the advowson of the church. His gifts included two large silver flagons, which were still in use into the 20th century, and a five-light stained glass east window depicting the Spanish Armada, Elizabeth I, the Gunpowder Plot, the plague of 1625, and portraits of himself, his wife and children. He was interred in his family vault in the church, although his heart was buried at Hammersmith.

St Mildred's was destroyed in the Great Fire of London of 1666. Its silver plate, however, survived, having been taken to safety in Hackney in a hired carriage. After the fire the parish of the church of St Margaret Moses, which was also destroyed but not rebuilt, was united to that of St Mildred.

== Rebuilding ==
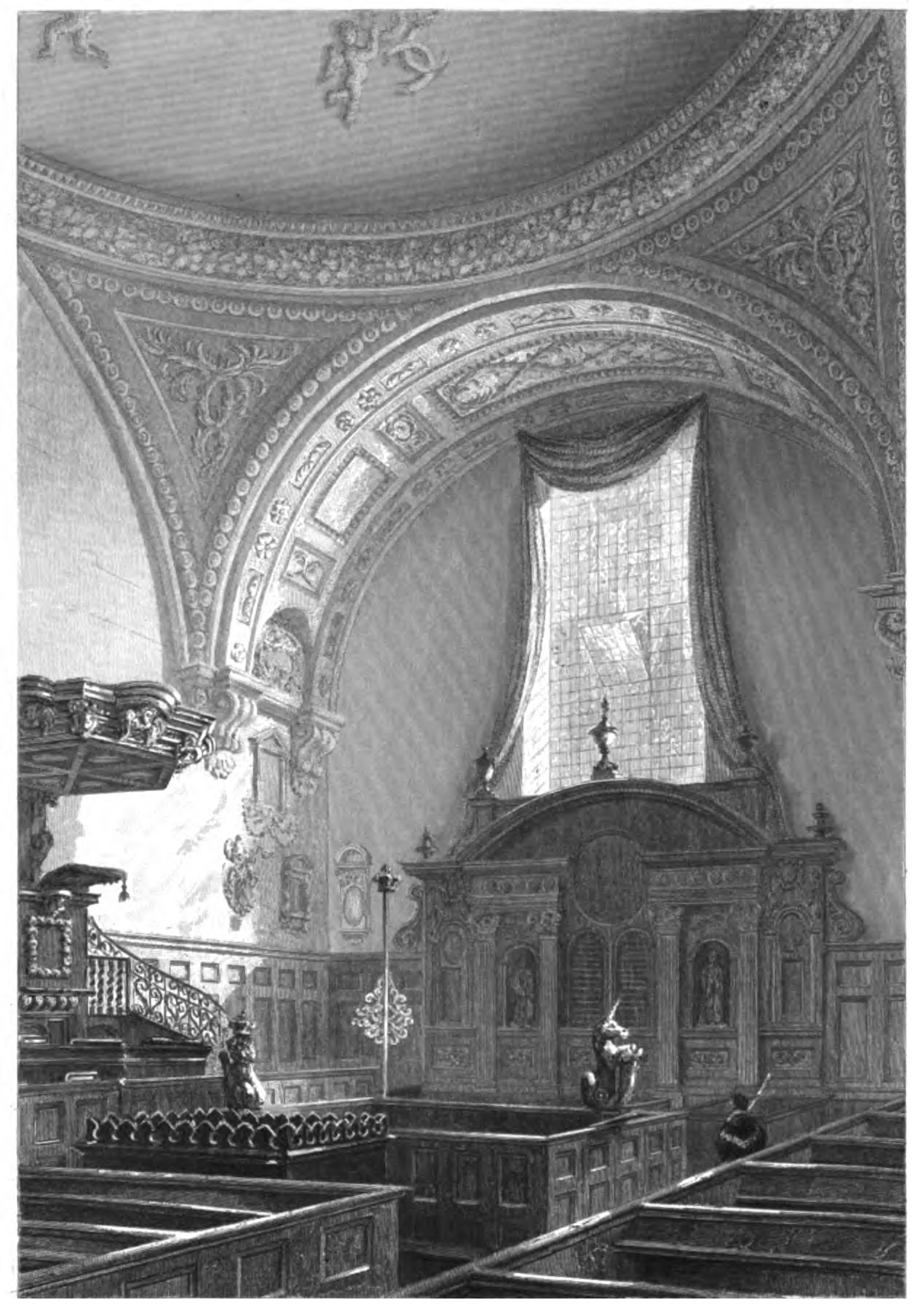
The original interior with Baroque furnishing and the main altar.

The church was rebuilt between 1677 and 1683 to the designs of Sir Christopher Wren at a cost of £3,705 13s 6d. It was 62 feet (19 m) long and 36 feet (11 m) wide. The construction was by Edward Strong the Elder.

The new building was without aisles, the ceiling taking the form of a plastered dome constructed within the roof space, with short barrel vaults at the east and west ends. The dome was decorated with cherubs in high relief (removed in 1841), and supported on pendentives with elaborate plaster decoration. There was one window on each of the four walls. The frontage to Bread Street, at the western end, was faced in Portland stone with a curved pediment, but the rest of the church, including the tower, was of brick. There was a wooden spire, covered in lead.

== Evangelical influence ==
In the late eighteenth century, several prominent Evangelical clergymen attended St. Mildred. The two most famous are Thomas Scott the Commentator, and Daniel Wilson, who eventually became the Bishop of Calcutta. Scott "was appointed to the Sunday afternoon lectureship in Bread Street, February 16, 1790, and retained it till he was chosen sole chaplain to the Lock, in March 1802." At the time, "his congregation seldom much exceeded a hundred in number; but they were attentive hearers, and he had reason to believe that his preaching there was useful to many persons, several of whom have since become instruments of good to others". Scott's lectures took place on Sunday afternoons, and Daniel Wilson was among those who attended.

== Nineteenth and twentieth centuries ==
The poet Percy Bysshe Shelley married the author Mary Godwin in the church on 30 December 1816.

Thomas Gilbank Ackland was rector of the church from 1818 until his death in 1844.

In 1898 many bodies were disinterred and removed to Brookwood Cemetery. The remains of Sir Nicholas Crisp, found in a stone coffin, were, however, reunited with his heart at Hammersmith. In 1932 a bust of Arthur Phillip, the first Governor of New South Wales was unveiled on the west wall of the church.

The church, with its original fittings, remained in good condition until its destruction by bombing in 1941 when most of its records were lost; the registers had, however, been published by the Harleian Society in 1912. The parish became one of the eight to have been reunited with St Mary-le-Bow at different times.

The site was excavated by the Museum of London Department of Urban Archaeology between 1973 and 1974. Remains of a 1st-century Roman building, probably a house, were found beneath those of the church. The former site of the church is now the location of the 30 Cannon Street office building.

== See also ==
- List of Christopher Wren churches in London
- List of churches rebuilt after the Great Fire but since demolished
