= St Margaret Moses =

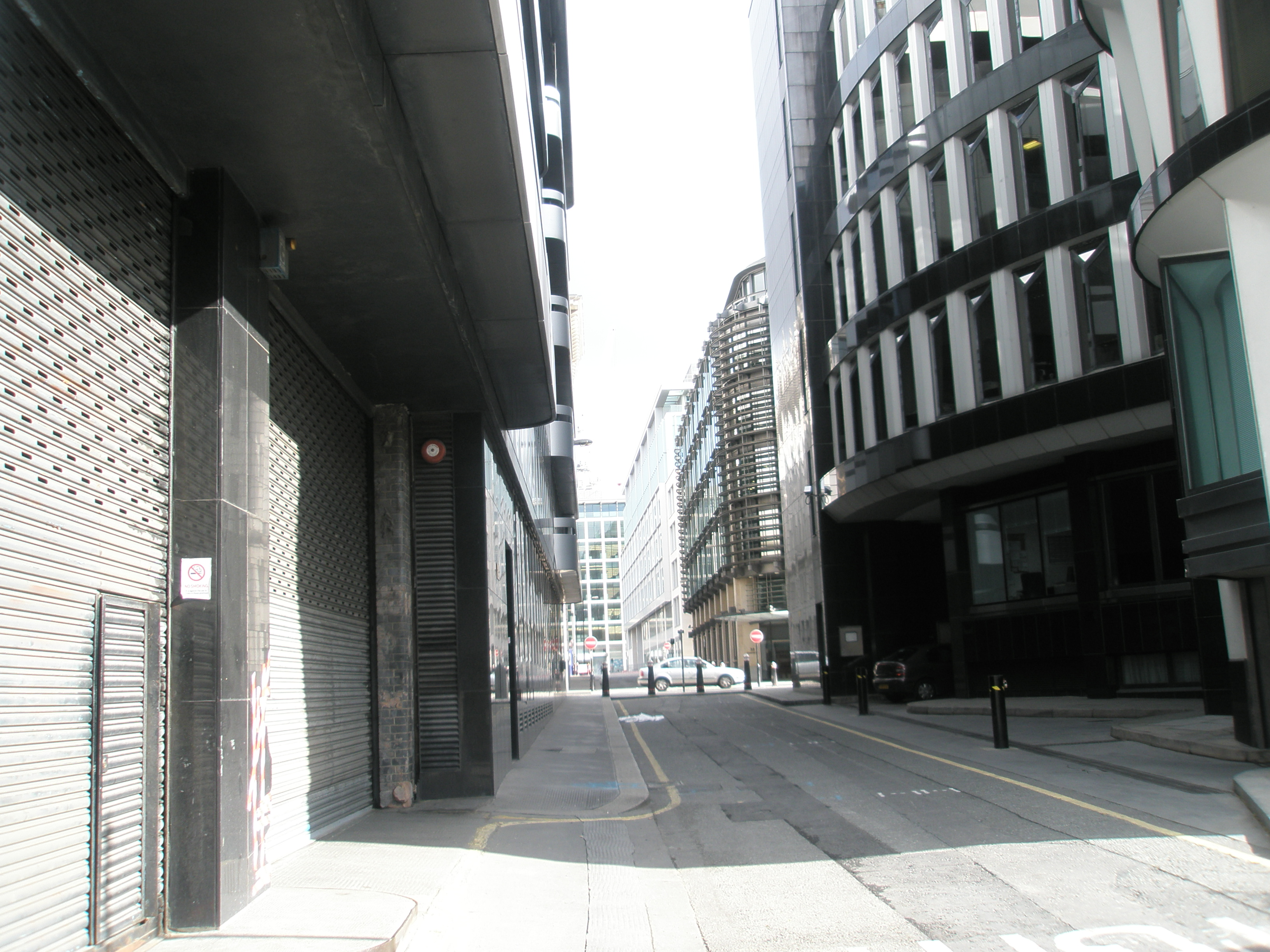
- Current photo of site
- Location: London
- Country: England
- Denomination: Anglican

History
- Founded: 12th century

Architecture
- Demolished: 1666

The church of St Margaret Moses was a parish church which stood on the east side of Friday Street in the Bread Street ward of the City of London. It was destroyed in the Great Fire of London of 1666 and not rebuilt; instead the parish was united with that of St Mildred Bread Street.

== History ==
The church's name is thought to come from an early benefactor named Moses or Moyses. In 1105 Fitzwalter Robert Fitzwalter gave the patronage of the church to the Priory of St Faith, which he had founded in Horsham St Faith in Norfolk. In the late 14th century, the Crown seized St Faith's on the pretext of it being an alien priory, and thus became the patron of the church. The church was repaired and improved in 1627 at the expense of the parishioners.

In 1550 the incumbent was the Protestant martyr John Rogers.

The church was not rebuilt following its destruction in the Great Fire of London in 1666; instead its parish was united with that of St Mildred, Bread Street. Part of the site was sold to the City for the widening of Pissing Alley, (later decorously renamed Little Friday Street) which ran between Friday Street and Bread Street, while the remainder was retained to serve as a graveyard for the parishioners.
