= Thomas Gilbank Ackland =

English clergyman and poet

Thomas Gilbank Ackland (18 November 1789 – 20 February 1844) was an English clergyman.

== Life ==
Ackland was educated at Charterhouse School and St. John's College, Cambridge, gaining his B.A. in 1811 and M.A. in 1814.

He was ordained as a deacon in 1813, and as a priest the following year. He held the posts of stipendiary curate and lecturer at St Andrews, Holborn, lecturer at St Mildred, Poultry, and stipendiary curate at St Bartholomew-by-the-Exchange, before, in 1818, being instituted to the rectory of St. Mildred's, Bread Street, which he held till his death on 20 February 1844.

In 1816 he was appointed domestic chaplain to the Duke of York. He married 16 May 1811 Harriet Clinton Baddeley.

In 1812 he published by subscription a volume of miscellaneous poems in the style of the 18th century. He was also the author of a few sermons; reviewing his Sermon preached before the University of Cambridge, on Commencement Sunday, July 5, 1829, the British Critic and Quarterly Theological Review said "The spirit and eloquence with which Dr. Ackland protests against modern indifference and liberalism, entitle him to be ranked among those who are doing good service to the Christian cause".
