= 30 Cannon Street =

Grade II listed office building in the City of London

Coordinates: 51.51246°N 0.09478°W

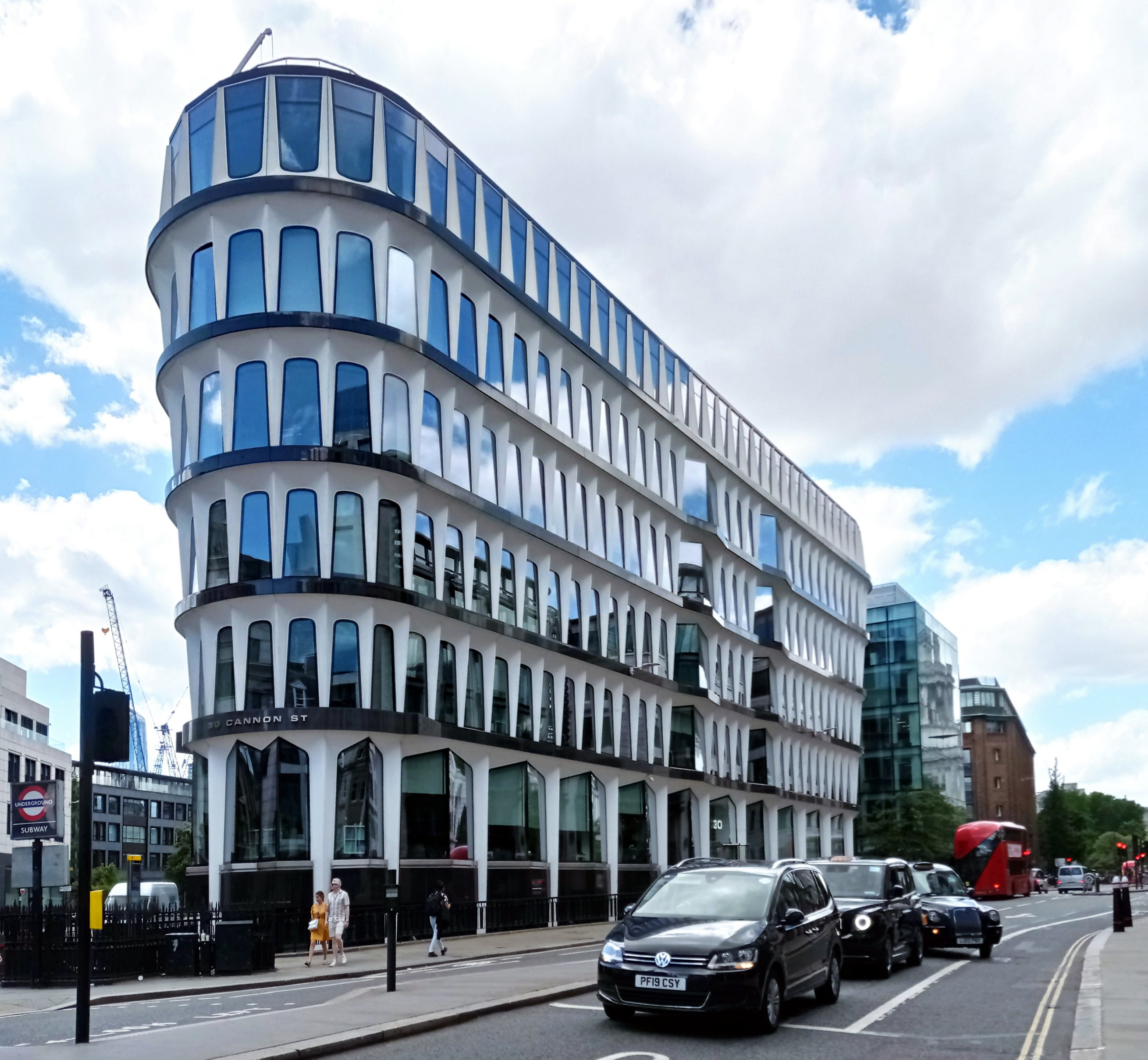
30 Cannon Street

30 Cannon Street is a modern office building on Cannon Street in the City of London, close to Mansion House underground station. It was designed by Whinney, Son & Austen Hall as an office building for Crédit Lyonnais and built between 1974 and 1977. It became a Grade II listed building in 2015.

The location was formerly the site of the city church of St Mildred, Bread Street, designed by Christopher Wren after the medieval church was destroyed in the Great Fire of London; the Wren church was bombed and destroyed in the Second World War. The site was one of the last bomb sites in London to be redeveloped.

The building has six storeys with a raised basement. Its height was limited due to its proximity to St Paul's Cathedral to the north-west, and the high water table prevented a sub-basement. Its shape was constrained by its triangular island site, east of Bread Street, west of the junction where Cannon Street crosses Queen Victoria Street. It originally had an entrance on each façade (the western one on Bread Street has been removed) and a large central circular banking hall (also now removed). Although built for Crédit Lyonnais, it was designed so it could be occupied by three separate banks, one in each corner of the building, but the interior has been significantly altered.

The façades are characterised by tiers of repeating arched white frames around recessed windows of bronze-tinted glass, with each tier separated by a black granite string course which incorporates hidden drainage. The cladding units are pre-cast double-skinned 1.5 metres (4 ft 11 in) wide modules of glass fibre reinforced cement (GRC), using a mixture of Portland cement with 5% alkali-resistant glass fibre as reinforcement. It was the first building in the world to be entirely clad with GRC panels. Triple-width modules on the ground floor 4.5 metres (15 ft) wide have two canted windowpanes meeting at an angle, with similar modules repeated on upper floors to either side of the entrances. The slim profile and light weight of the GRC panels allowed the architect to slope the walls outward at an angle of five degrees, with each floor slightly larger than the one below, creating extra office space. The units of the partial upper floor are inverted, creating a roof line that resembles a crown to the north side and at the eastern end; a roof deck occupies the south-western corner. Railings on the street have shapes similar to the cladding panels.

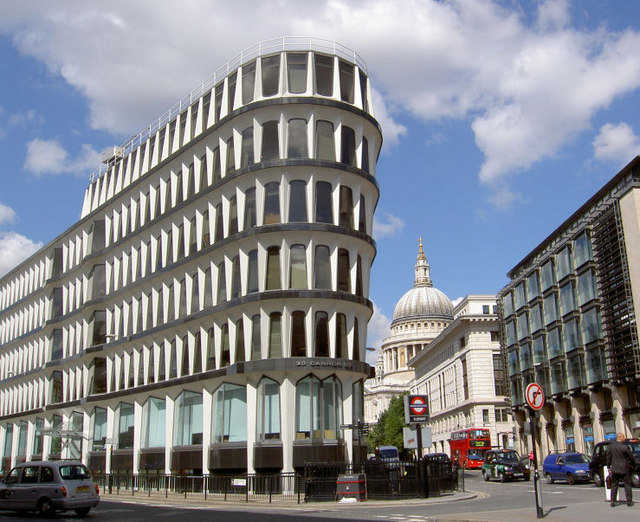
View in 2007 from south-east

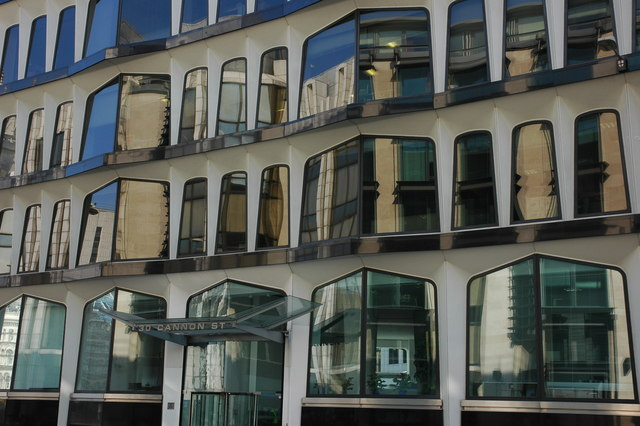
Details of windows and entrance in 2007
