= Cube house =

Dutch house type designed by Piet Blom

Coordinates: 51°55′13″N 4°29′26″E

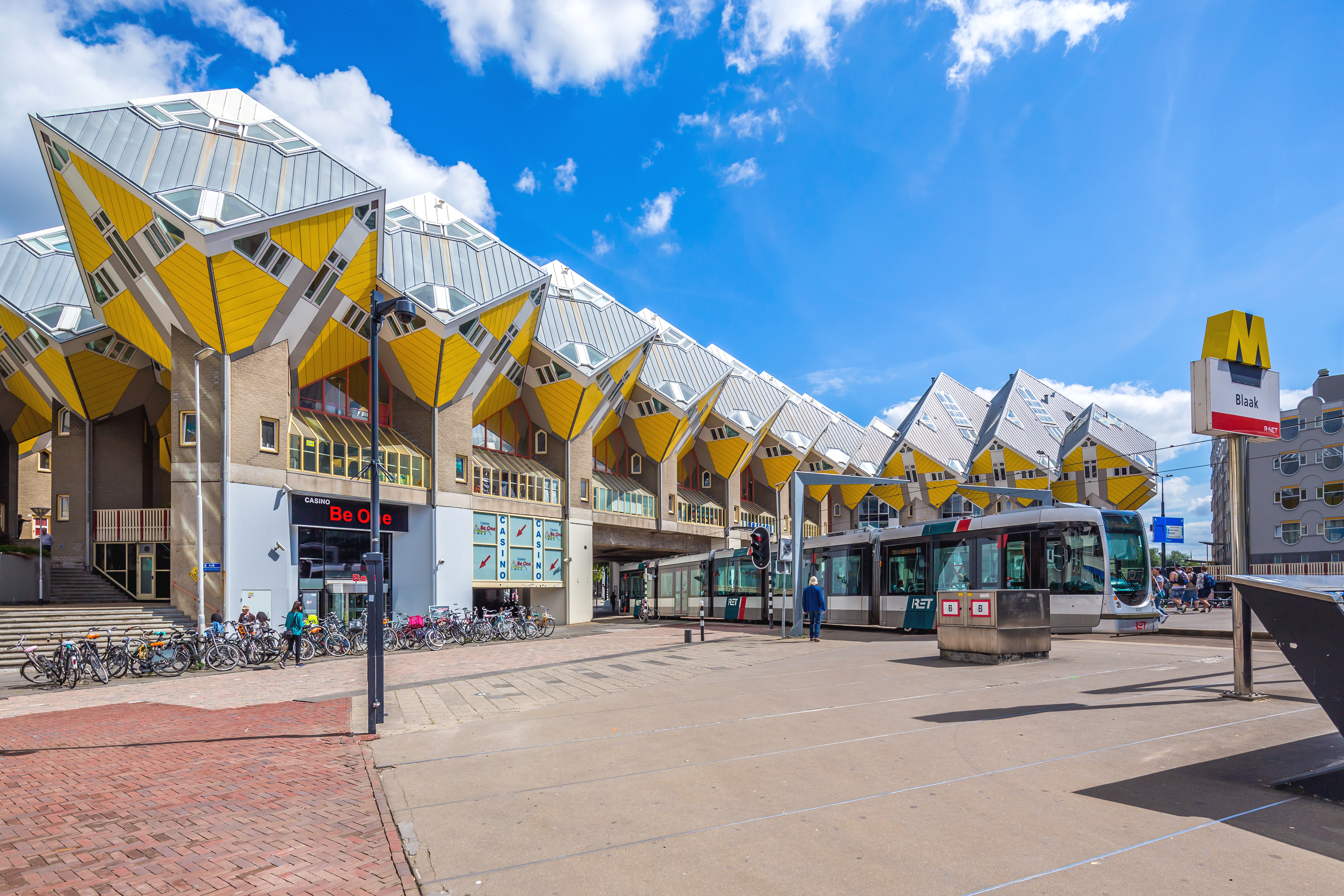
The cube houses in Rotterdam viewed from Blaak metro station

Cube houses (Dutch: kubuswoningen) are a set of innovative houses built in the cities of Helmond and Rotterdam in the Netherlands, designed by architect Piet Blom. They are based on the concept of "living as an urban roof": high density housing with sufficient space on the ground level; its main purpose being to optimize the space inside. Blom combatted the ideas of conventional residential architecture by tilting the cube shape on its corner and rested it upon a hexagon-shaped pylon. Blom's main goal was to create an urban area that felt like a village. The cube houses around the world are meant to optimize the space as a house and to efficiently distribute the rooms inside.

== Helmond ==
In 1972, Piet Blom was assigned to fill an empty site in the city center of Helmond with a meeting center. Blom proposed a plan that mixed cultural facilities with houses and concluded that the cube houses should surround Theater 't Speelhuis (English: the playhouse), creating an interesting architectural whole. After the underground parking garage was taken out of the plans, the plan was reduced to 60 houses. The city council was not satisfied so Minister Hans Gruijters subsidized the building of 3 test houses in the Wilhelminalaan in 1974. The project also received the national status of 'Experimental Housing', which helped to realize Theater 't Speelhuis: a forecourt surrounded by 18 cube houses at the Piet Blomplein in 1977. The theatre burned down on December 29, 2011 which also damaged two adjacent cube houses. The damaged houses were later restored in 2013 and 2014.

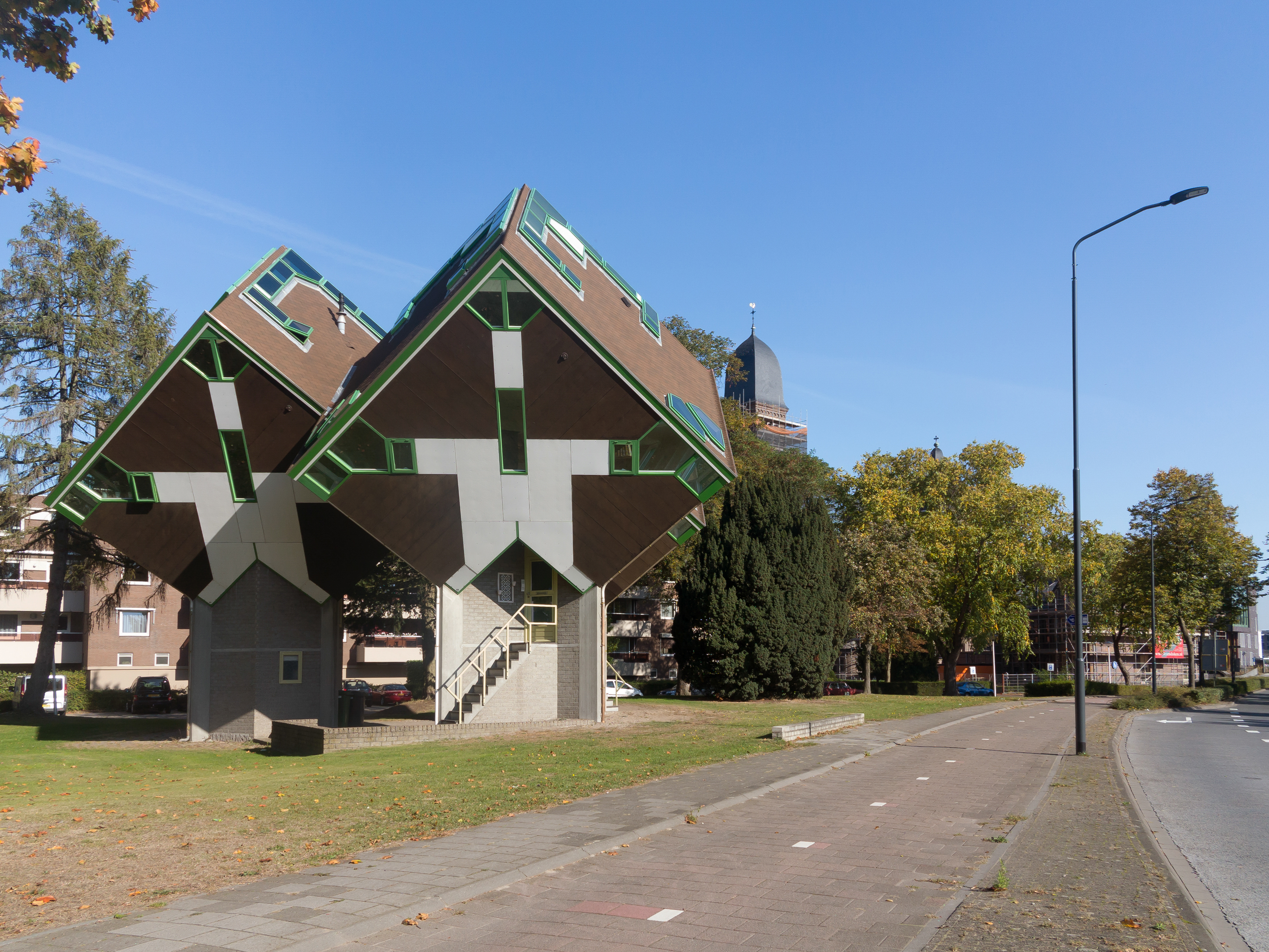
The three test cubes, seen from the Kasteel-Traverse.

Polygoon film journal showing the test cubes and plans, NL, 1976

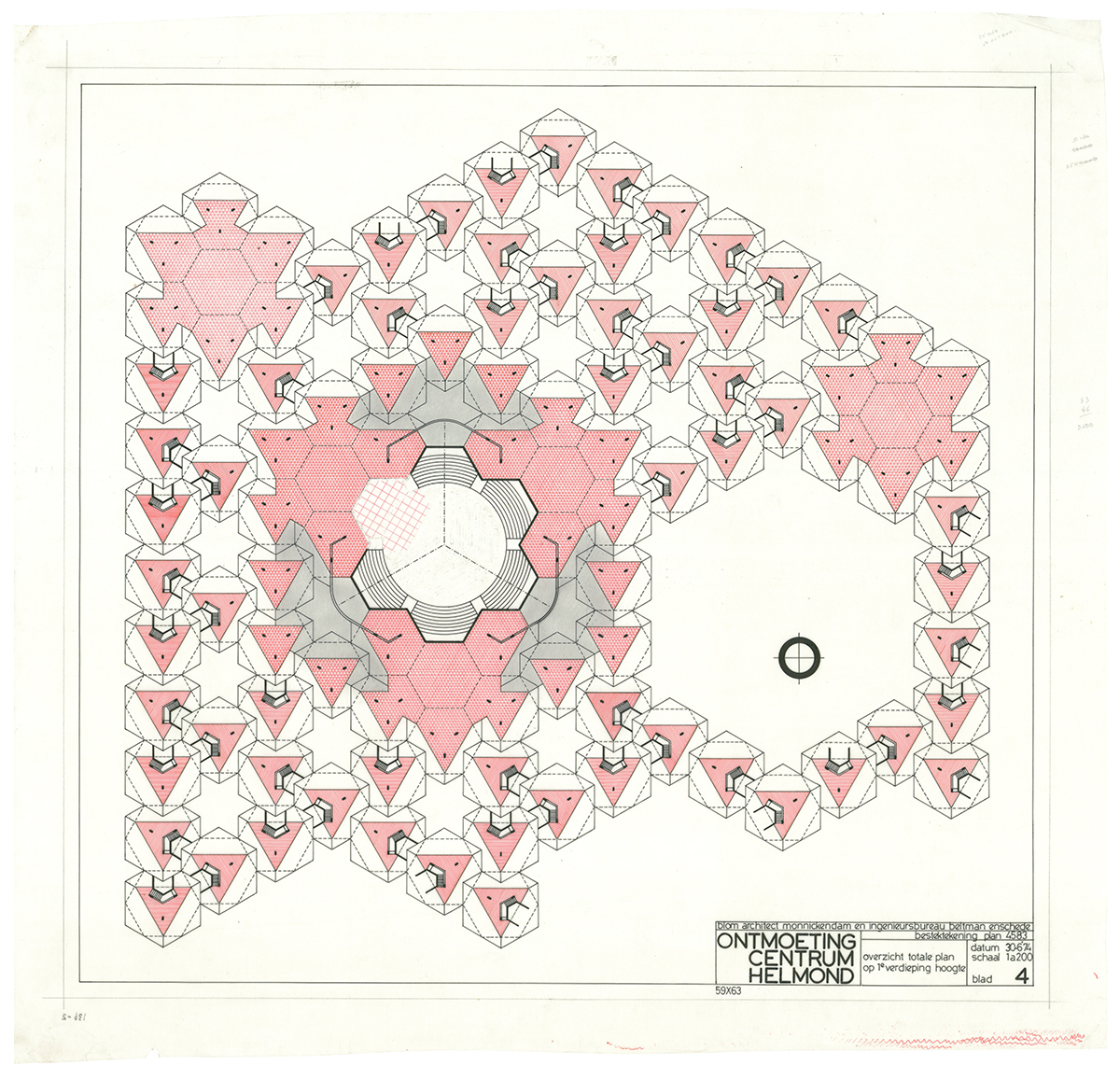
Piet Blom's first floor design, 60 houses, 1974

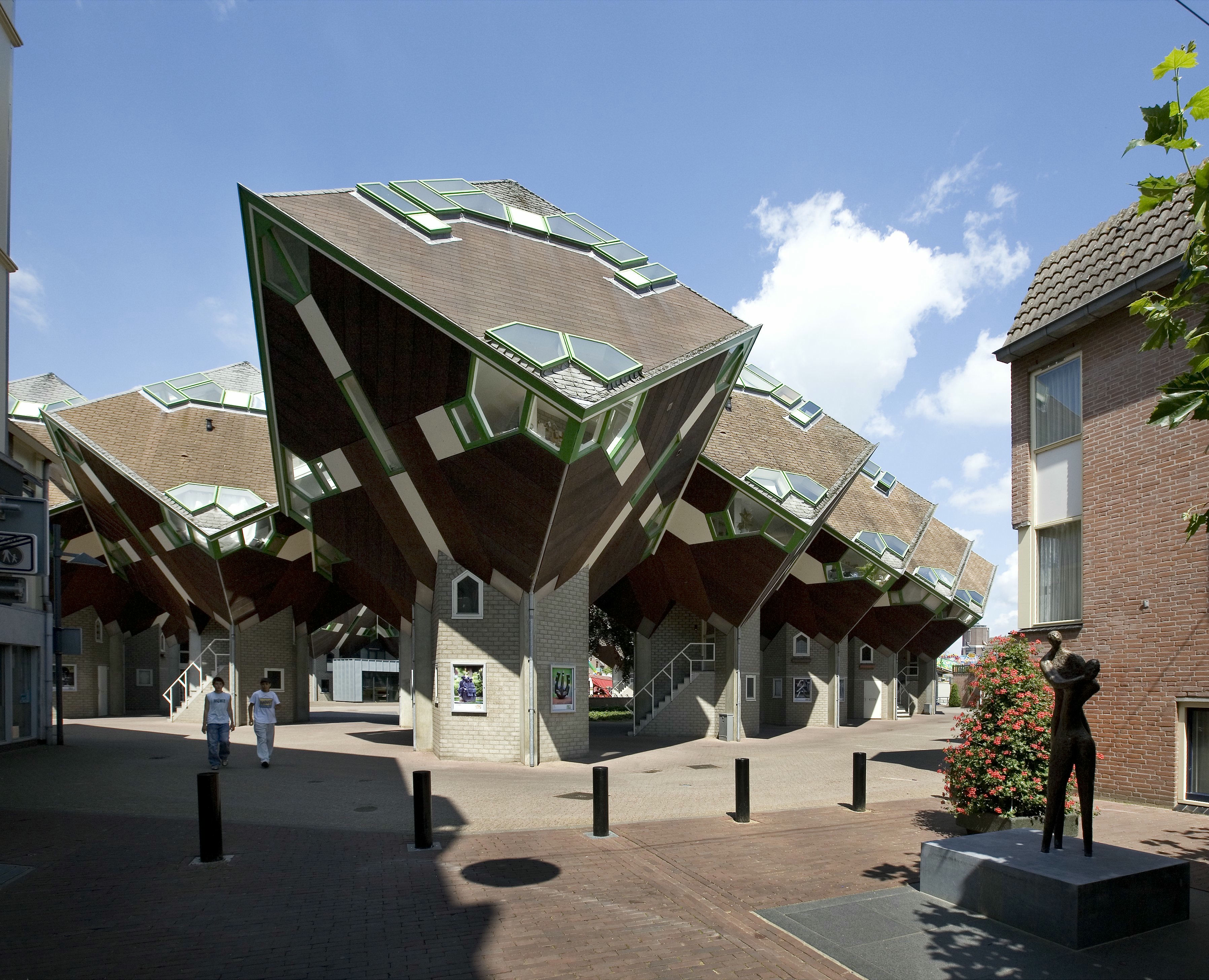
City entrance of the square with cube houses

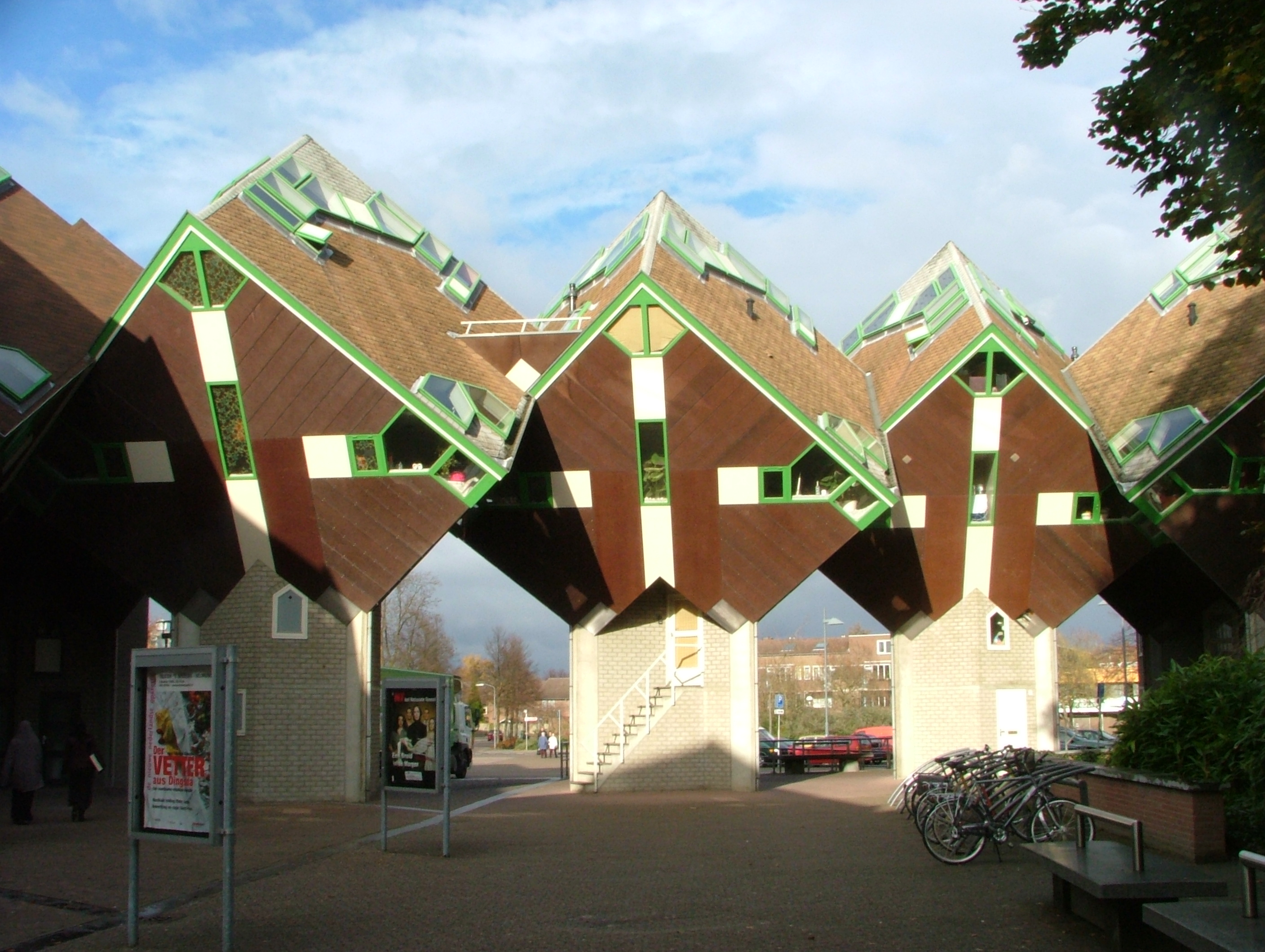
Cube houses seen from the square in front of the theater.

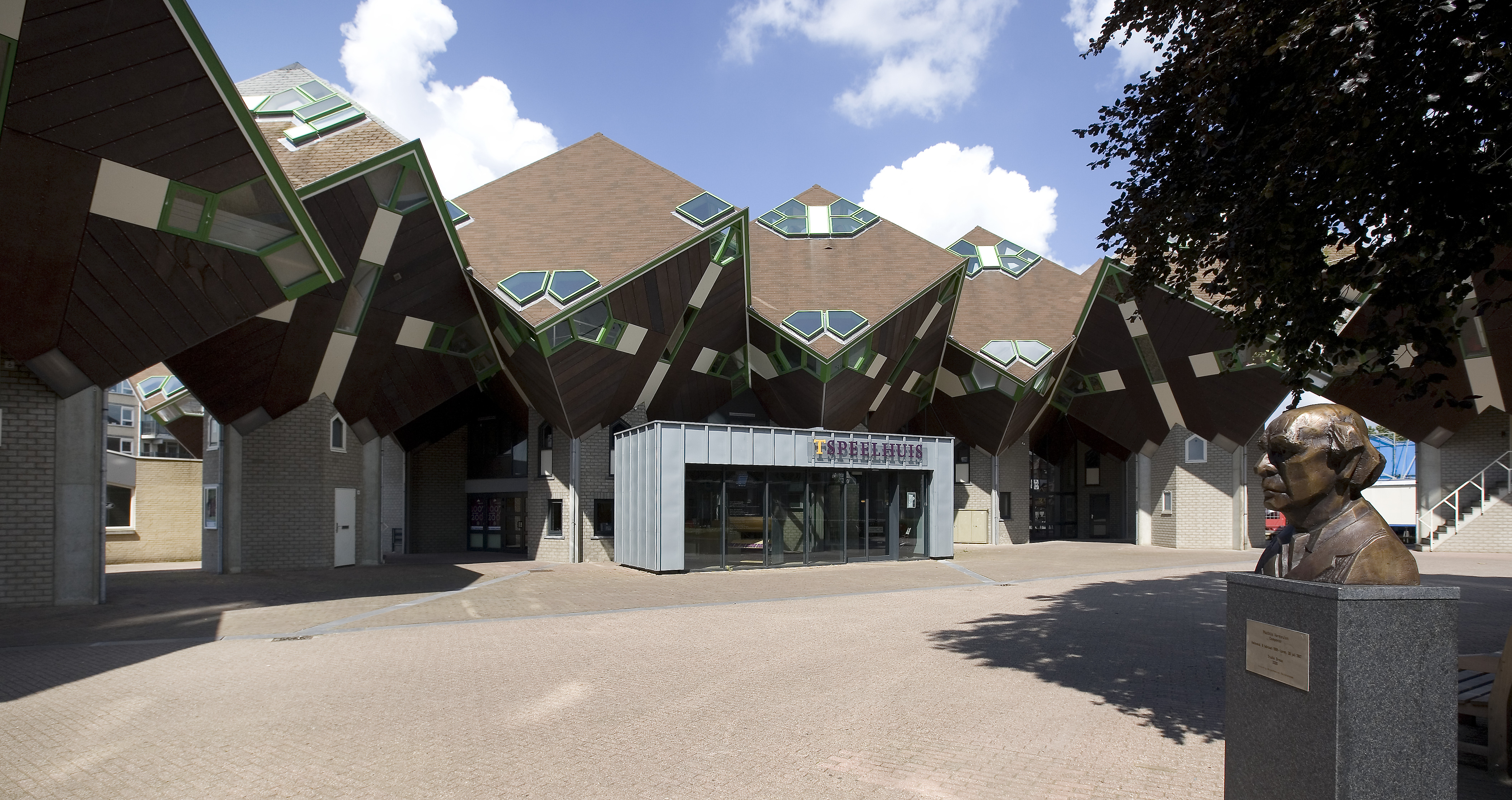
Entrance theater 't Speelhuis, disguised as cube houses

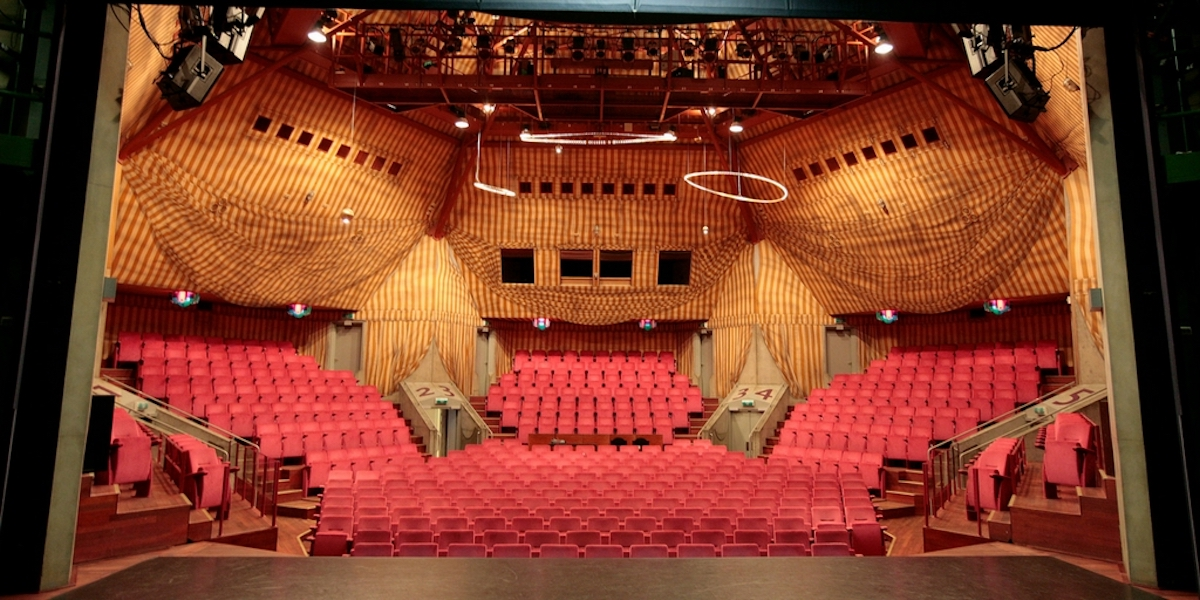
Circus tent painting by Har Sanders

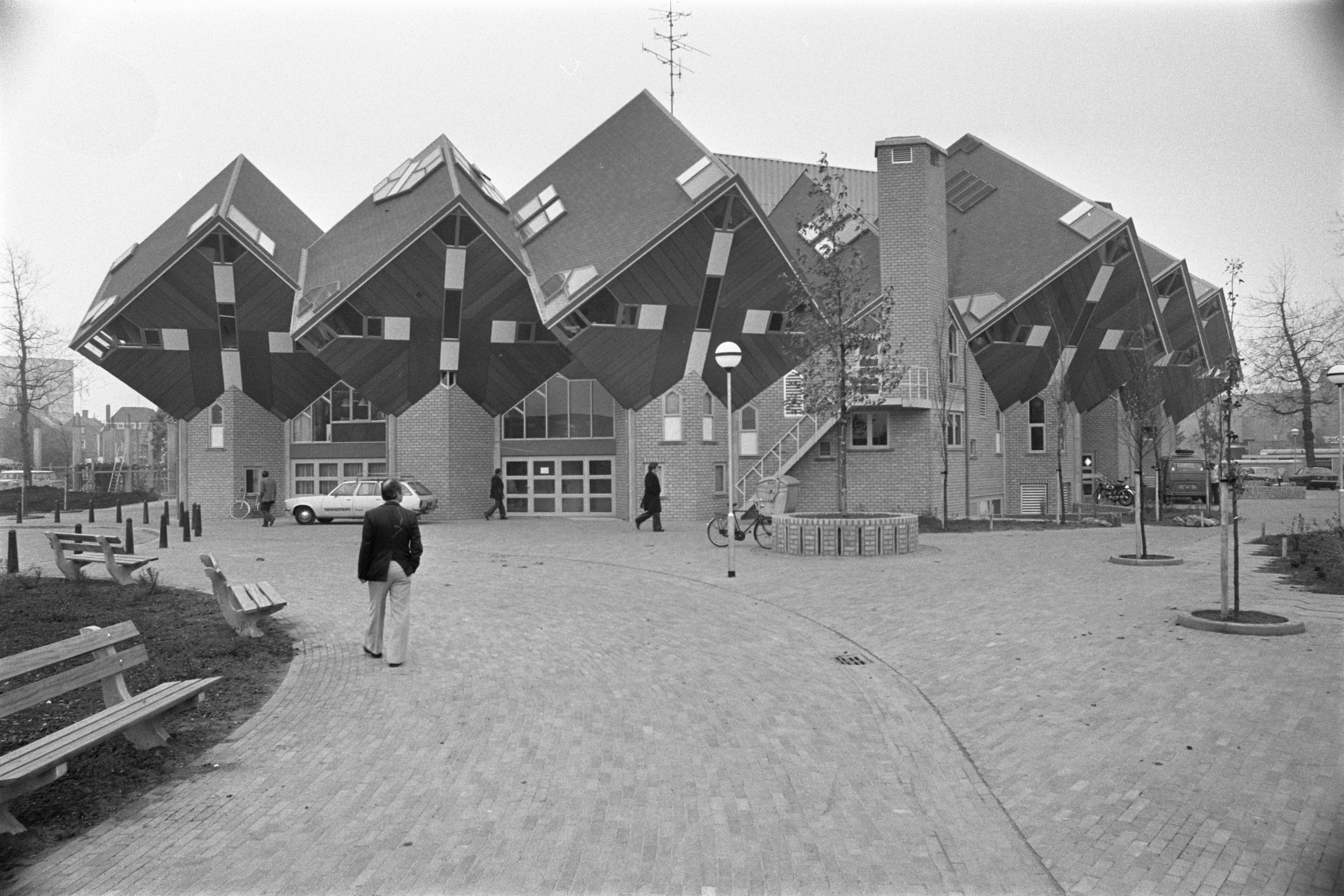
Backside of the theater, disguised as cube houses

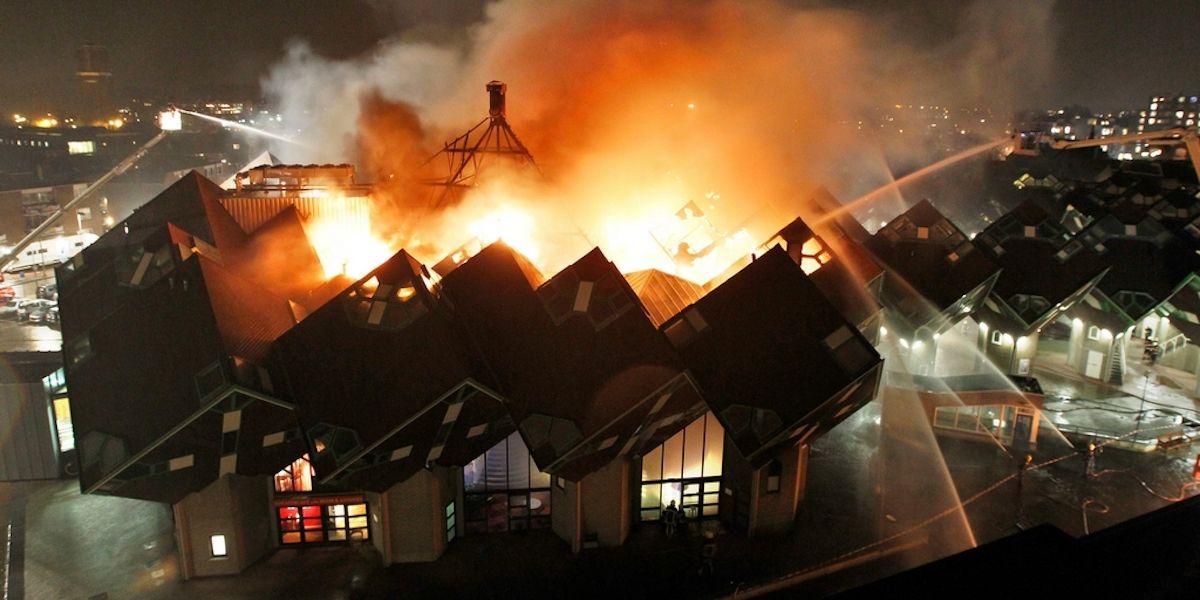
't Speelhuis on fire, 29-12-2011

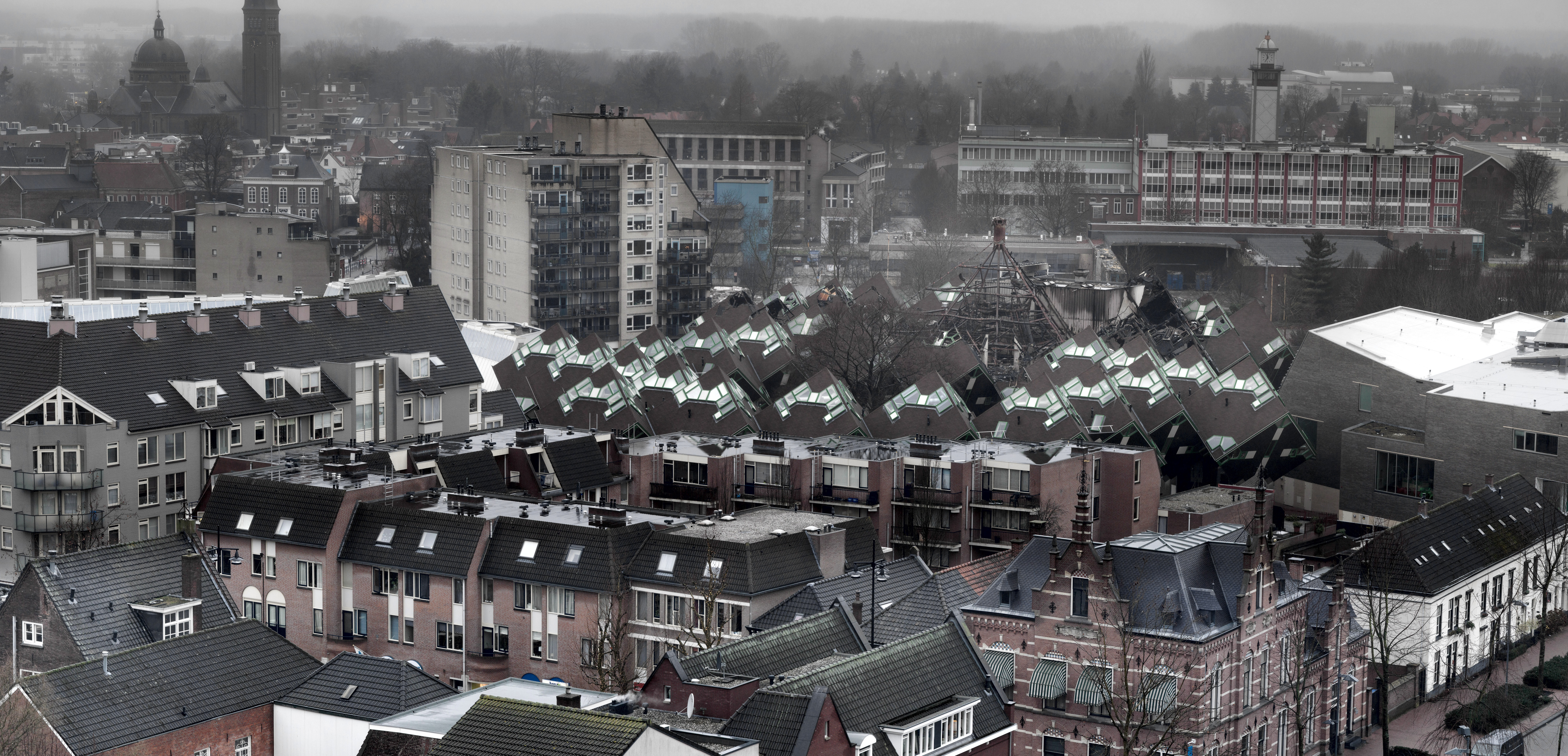
The remains, two days after the fire

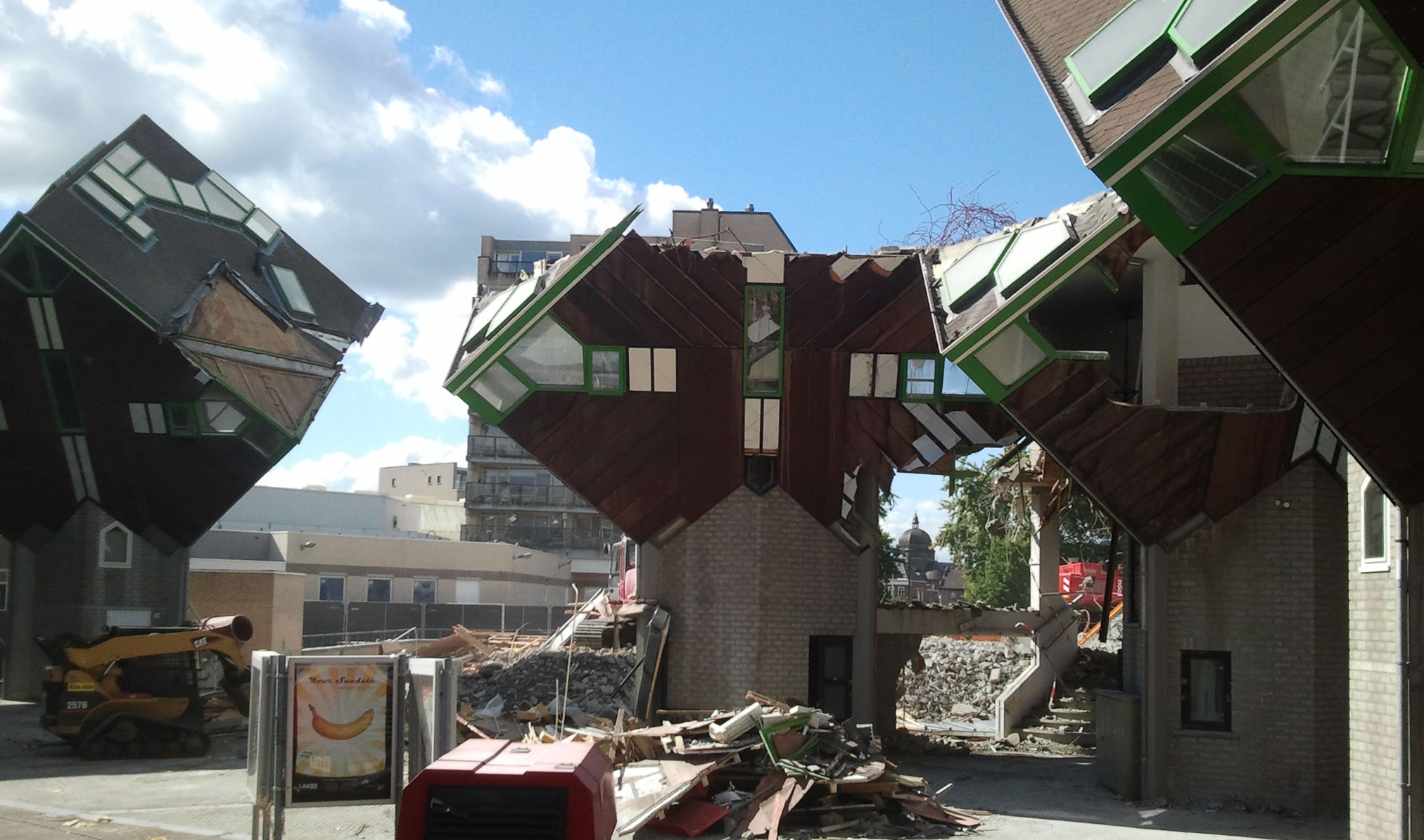
't Speelhuis demolished in September of 2012

== Rotterdam ==
The houses in Rotterdam, the country's second largest city, are located on Overblaak Street, right above the Blaak metro station. The 1977 original plan showed 55 houses, but not all of them were built. There are 38 small cubes and two so called 'super-cubes', all attached to each other.

As residents are disturbed so often by curious passers-by, one owner decided to open a "show cube", which is furnished as a standard house, and is making a living out of offering tours to visitors.

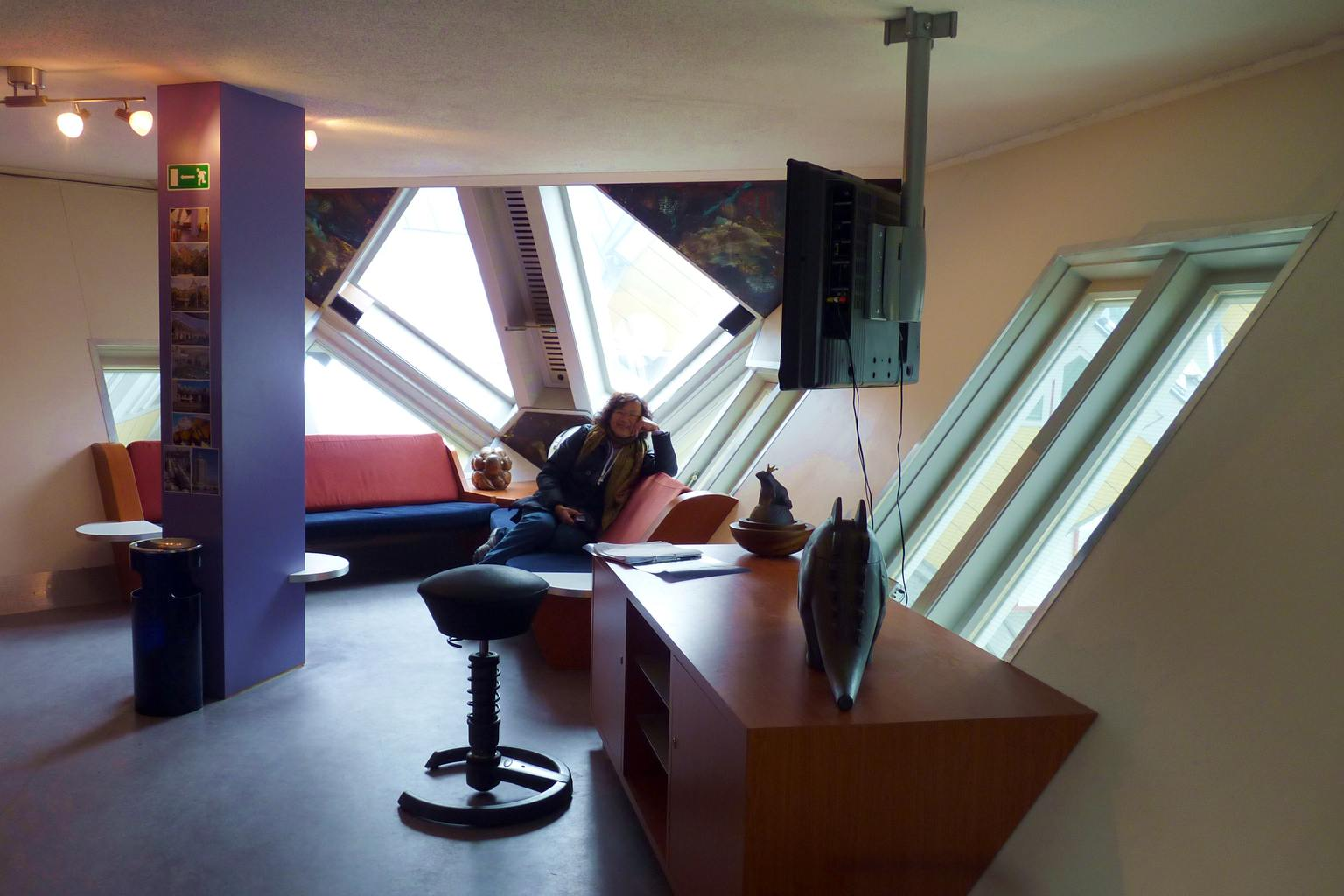
The living room of the "show cube" in Rotterdam

The walls and windows are angled at 54.7 degrees. The total area of the apartment is around 100 square metres (1,100 sq ft).

In 2006, a museum of chess pieces was opened under the houses.

In 2009, the greater cubes were converted by Personal Architecture into a hostel run by Dutch hostel chain Stayokay.

In 2019, the Art cube opened at Overblaak 30. The Art cube is a place where art and architecture come together. With the original living layout intact, this cube house forms the backdrop for the work of various local artists.

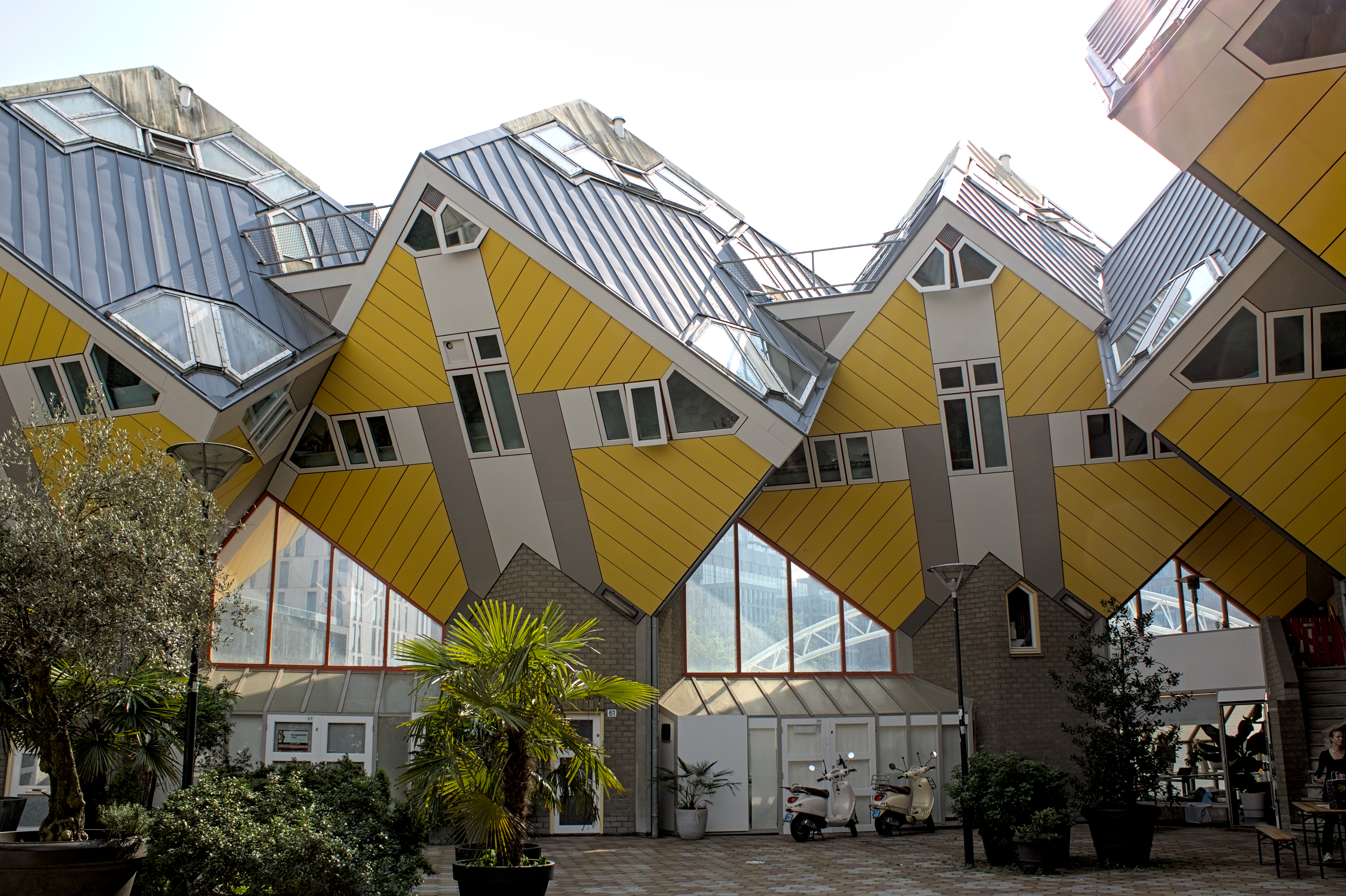
Cube houses in Rotterdam viewed from the central space

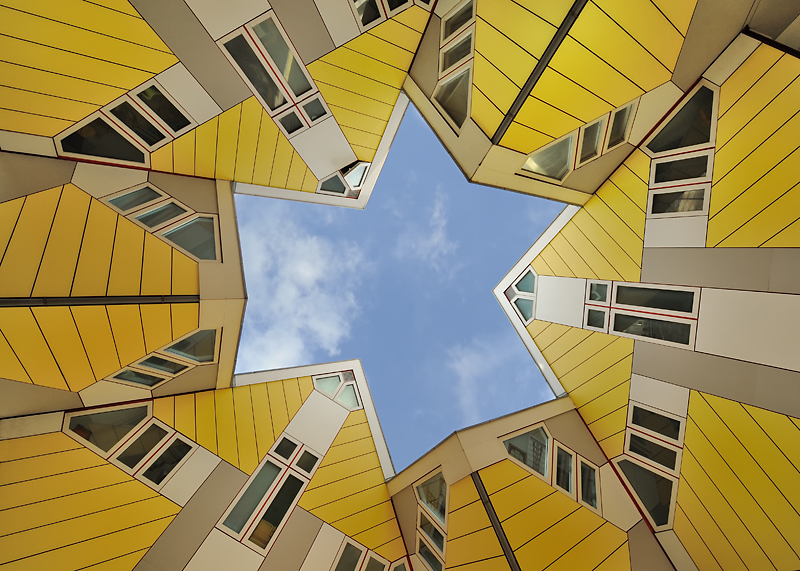
Cube houses viewed from beneath

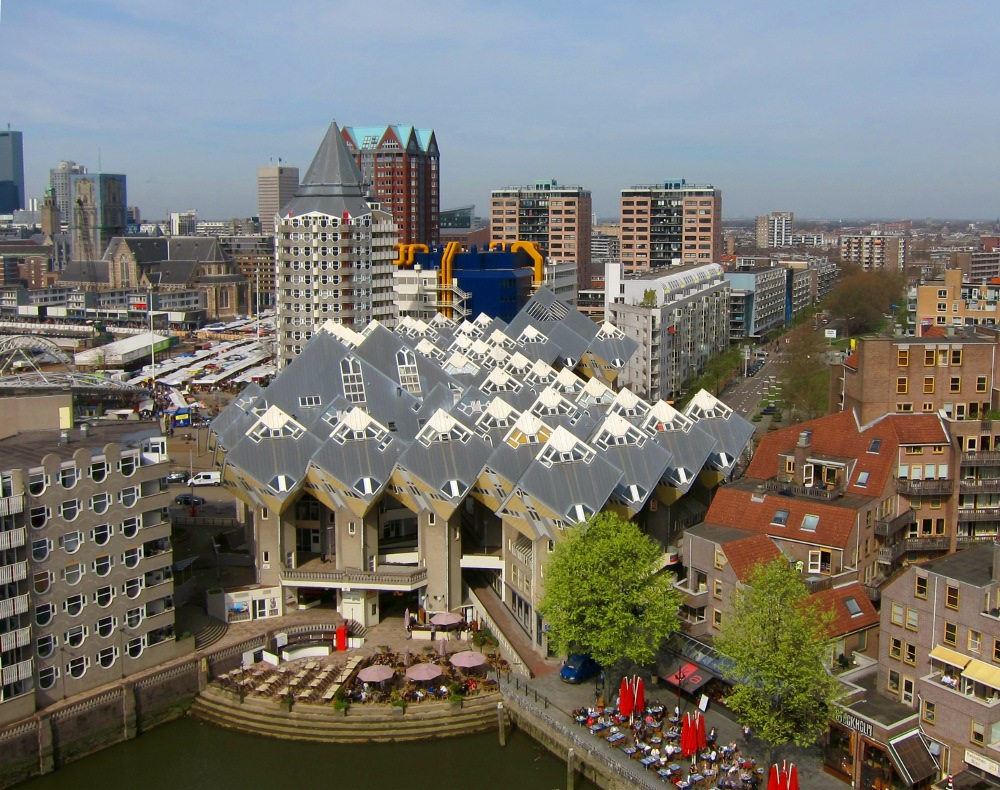
Aerial view of the entire complex

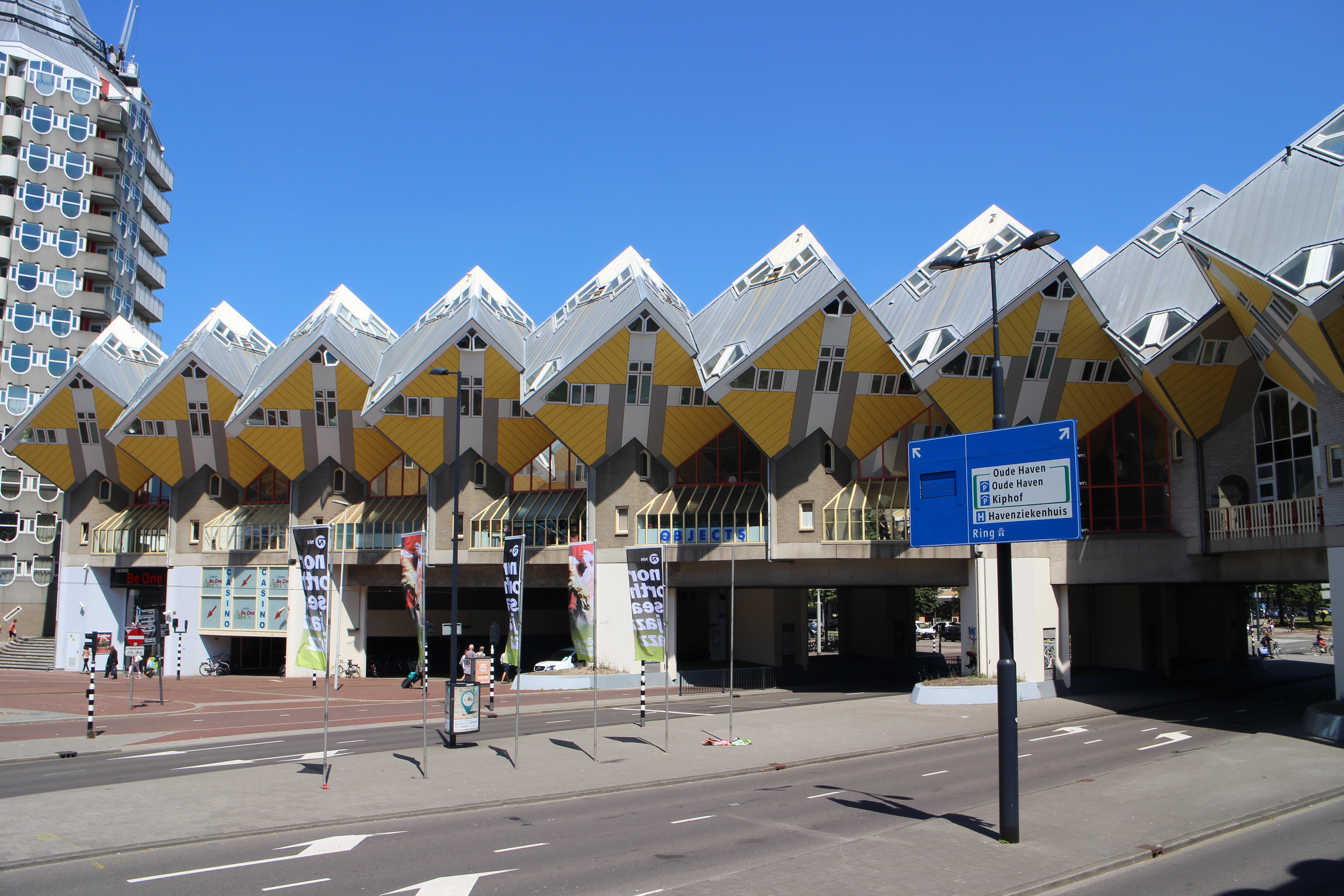
View from the south

== Structure and materials ==
The cube houses are constructed with reinforced concrete in the hexagonal trunk that holds the cube frame. The hexagonal base tilts the cubes up 54.7°, which in turn allows viewers inside to see the street below from the windows. The reinforced concrete floors and pillars hold up a wooden skeleton that creates the cubes. The wooden frame is clad with fiber-reinforced cement panels with rock wool inside for insulation. All windows are structural as well, either being double glass panels or infused with wire.

== Spaces ==
The cube houses are all linked together and overlap to create a unique façade. The entrance to the houses is a narrow staircase. The first floor is a triangular living room. The second floor has the windows facing the sky, as well as two bedrooms, a small living area, and a bathroom. The odd angle of the walls allows the area to feel more open but leaves a quarter of the area unusable. The top floor is a pyramid shaped room with 18 windows that give the viewer a sweeping view outside. All of the levels are connected by narrow wooden stairs.

== Similar buildings outside the Netherlands ==
In 1996 a house consisting of cluster of three cubes was built along Eastern Avenue in the city of Toronto, Canada. Architect Ben Kutner and partner Jeff Brown had been inspired by the original cube houses and wanted to replicate the Rotterdam design on otherwise unusable patches of land. The project was subsequently not extended further. In 2018, the land was sold for redevelopment with hopes the structures themselves could be saved and moved elsewhere. In 2021, an application was submitted to the city to redevelop into a "35-storey mixed-use building atop a podium element".
