= Piet Blom =

Dutch architect

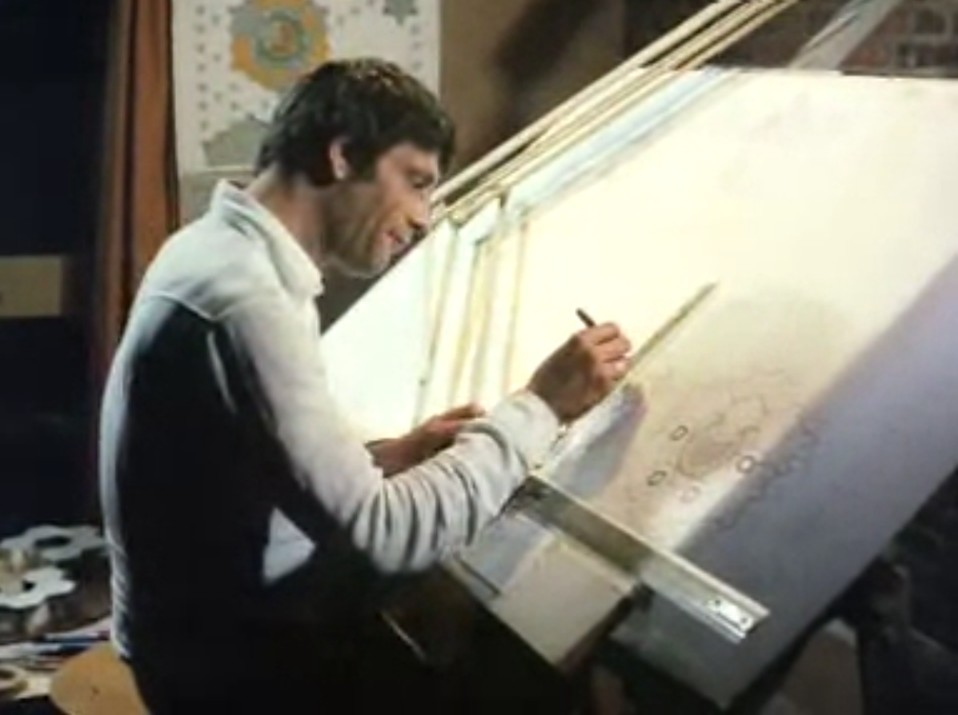
Piet Blom, 1974

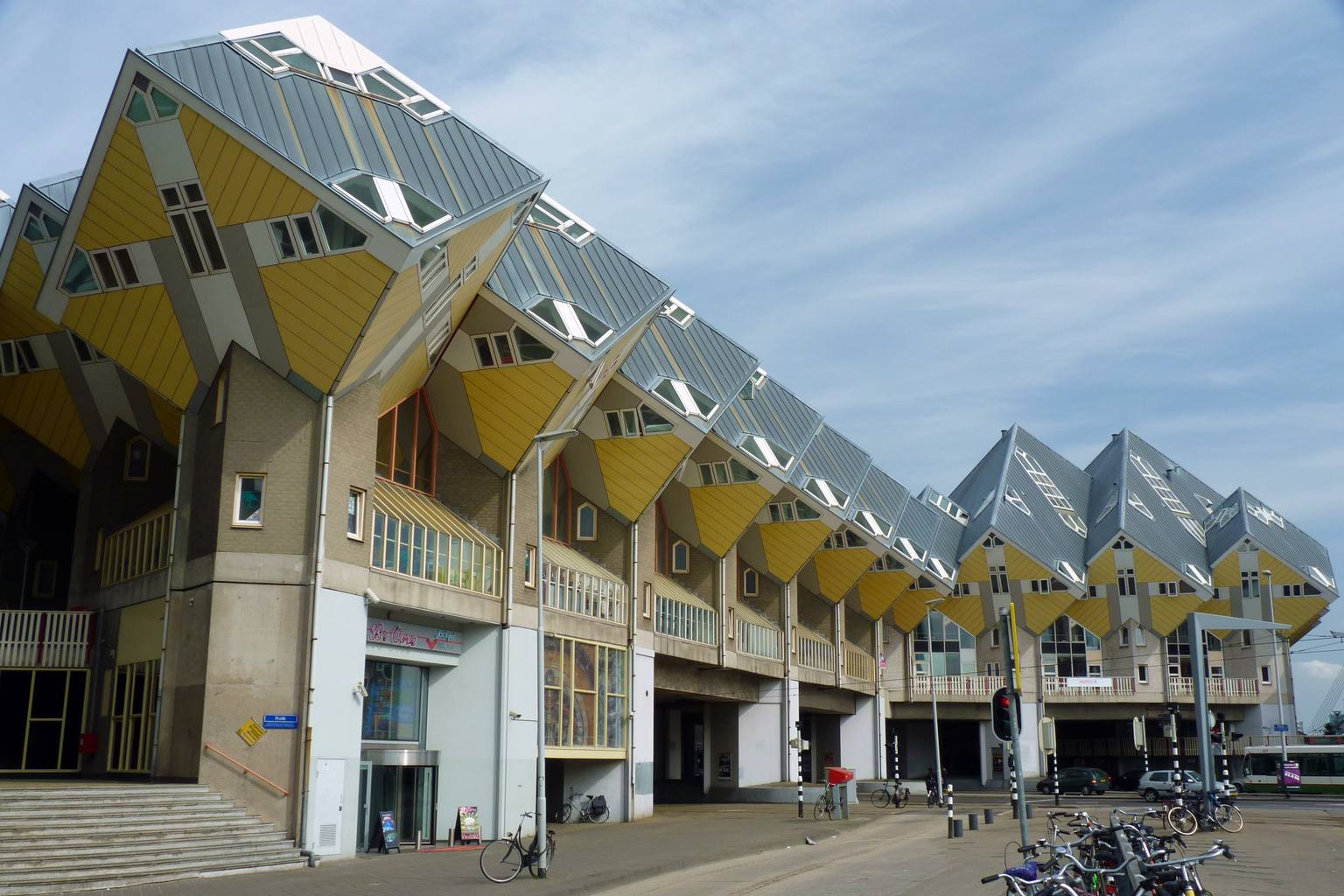
The cube houses in Rotterdam

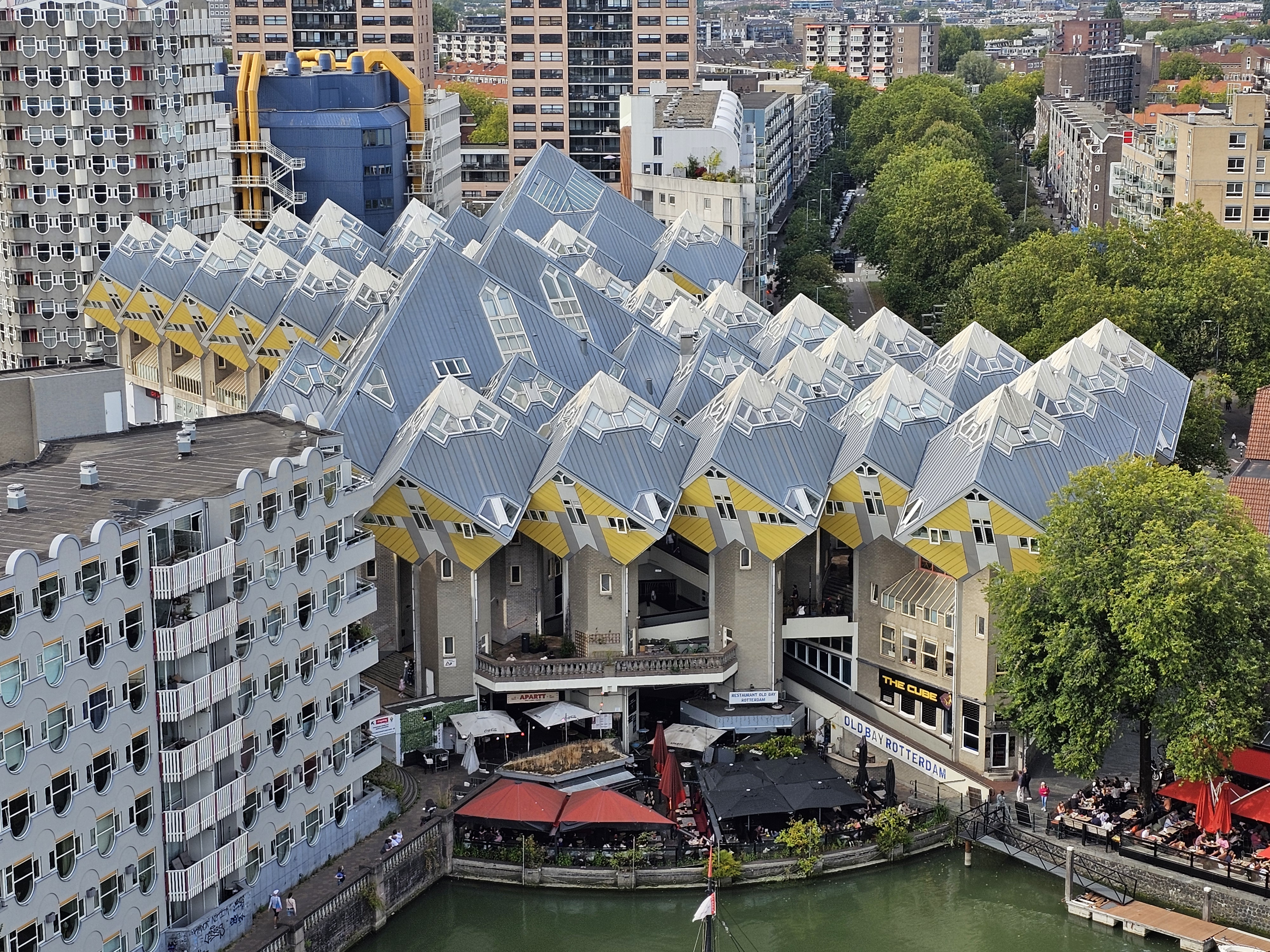
Cube Houses, Piet Blom (seen from Witte Huis)

Piet Blom (Dutch pronunciation: [pid ˈblɔm]; (Note: In isolation, Piet is pronounced [pit].) February 8, 1934 in Amsterdam – June 8, 1999 in Denmark) was a Dutch architect best known for his designs of the Bastille (1964–1969), a restaurant and student facility at the University of Twente, Enschede, the housing project Kasbah in Hengelo (1969–1973), and the Cube Houses built in Helmond (1972–1976) and in Rotterdam (1978–1984).

Blom studied at the Amsterdam Academy of Architecture as a student of Aldo van Eyck. Blom, Aldo van Eyck, Herman Hertzberger and others are representatives of the Structuralism movement.

Blom was selected as the Dutch Prix de Rome recipient in 1962.

At the Kasbah in Hengelo, there is a museum dedicated to Blom's works, which opened in May 2013. The square at which the cube houses in Helmond stand was given the name Piet Blomplein.
