= 1986 in architecture =

The year 1986 in architecture involved some significant architectural events and new buildings.

== Events ==
- March 15 – Hotel New World disaster: The six-story Lian Yak Building (1971) in Singapore, housing the Hotel New World, collapses in less than a minute due to structural failure, perhaps caused by a gas explosion, trapping 50 people and killing 33.
- undated
  - Construction work begins on Park Pobedy station in the Moscow Metro.
  - schmidt hammer lassen architects founded in Aarhus, Denmark.

== Buildings and structures ==
=== Buildings opened ===
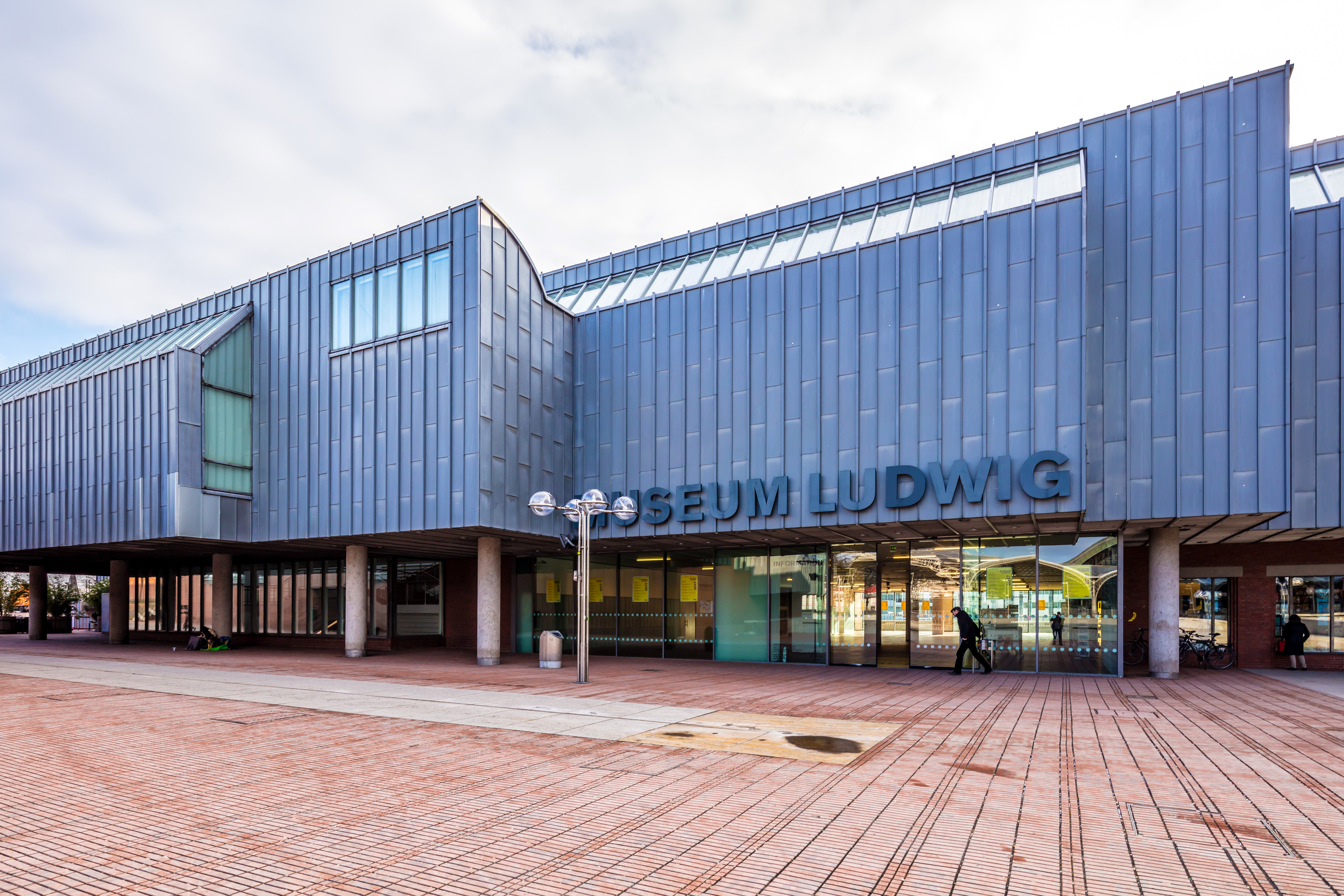
Museum Ludwig in Cologne, Germany

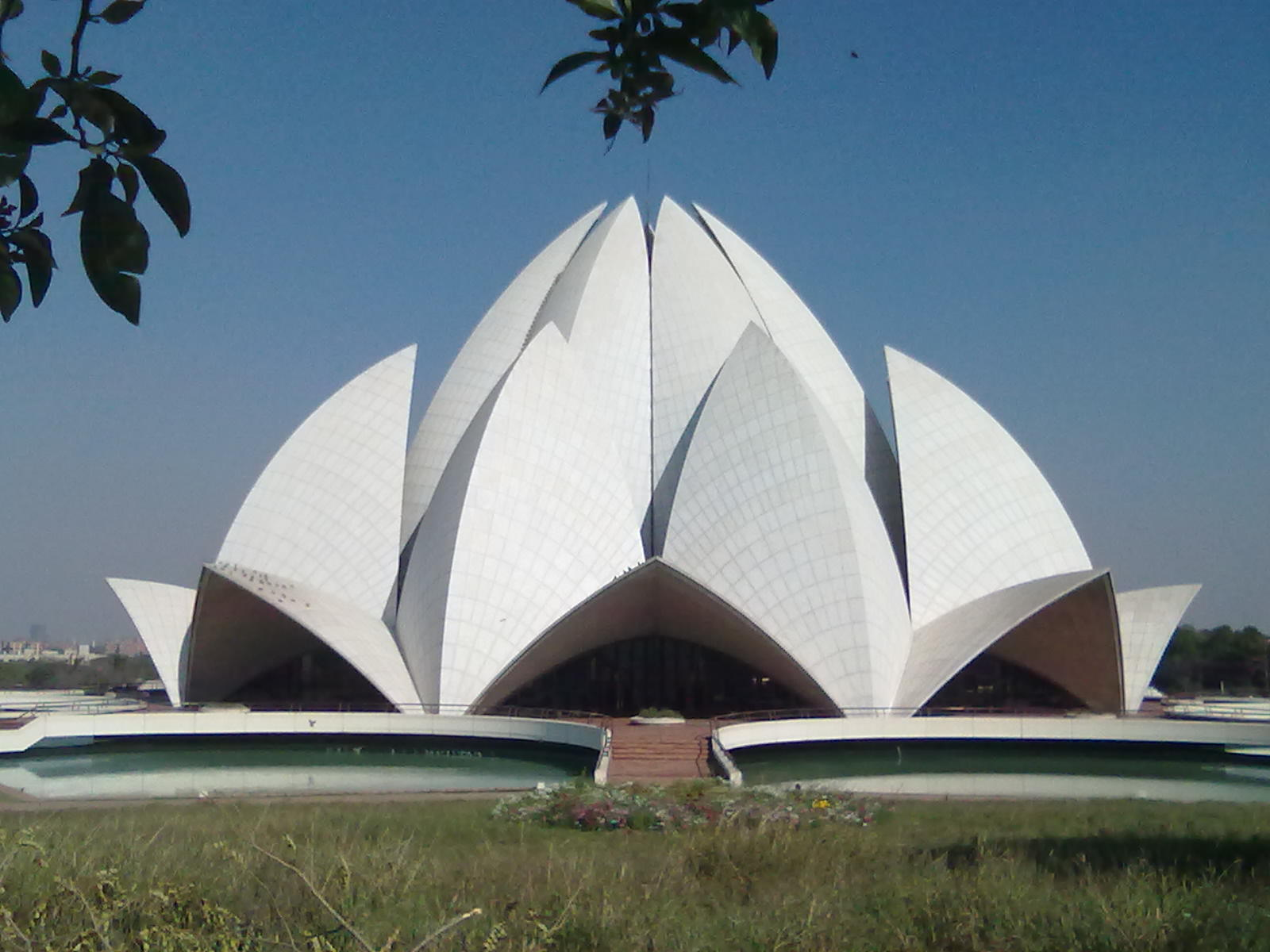
The Lotus Temple in New Delhi, India

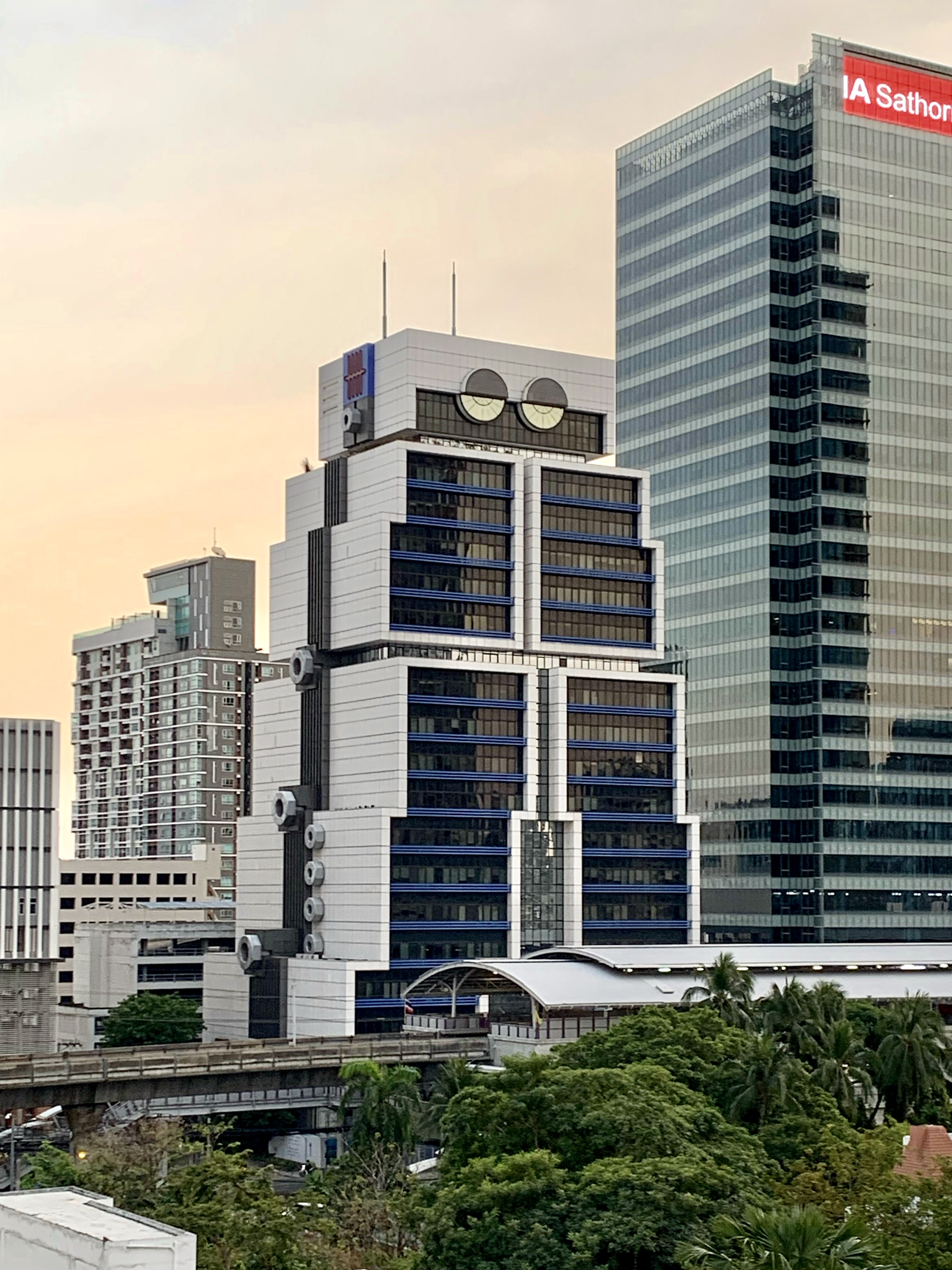
The Robot Building in Bangkok, Thailand

- January 17 – The Buenos Aires Argentina Temple is dedicated by Thomas S. Monson.
- May 11 – The Estadio Metropolitano Roberto Meléndez, in Barranquilla, Colombia.
- July 29 – Glasgow Sheriff Court Building in Glasgow, Scotland, formally opened by Queen Elizabeth II of the United Kingdom.
- September 14 – Museum Ludwig and Kölner Philharmonie in Cologne, Germany, designed by Peter Busmann and Godfrid Haberer.
- October 23 – The Beirut Memorial in Jacksonville, North Carolina, USA, is dedicated.
- October 26 – The nave of Hallgrímskirkja, a church in Reykjavík, Iceland, is consecrated.
- November 18 – The Lloyd's Building in the City of London, UK
- December 24 – The Lotus Temple in New Delhi, India, designed by Fariborz Sahba.

=== Buildings completed ===
- Museum Tower in Miami, Florida, United States.
- Rialto Towers in Melbourne, Australia.
- Temasek Tower in Singapore.
- The AXA Center in New York City, United States.
- The Dakin Building in Brisbane, California, United States.
- The Robot Building in Bangkok, Thailand.
- Nabemba Tower, Brazzaville, Republic of the Congo.
- The Fernmeldeturm Münster in Münster, Germany.
- The Tortoise Mountain TV Tower in Wuhan, China.
- The Town Pavilion in Downtown Kansas City, Missouri, United States.
- Zendstation Roosendaal in Roosendaal, Netherlands.
- The Lipstick Building in New York City, United States.
- 1221 Brickell Building in Miami, Florida, United States.
- 701 Brickell Avenue in Miami, Florida, United States.
- Henbury Hall, Cheshire, England, designed by Julian Bicknell after Palladio as depicted by Felix Kelly.
- Y Pencadlys (County Hall), headquarters of Gwynedd County Council in Caernarfon, Wales, designed by Dewi-Prys Thomas (died 1985) and executed by Council architects Merfyn Roberts and Terry Potter.
- Russian State Scientific Center of Robotics and Technical Cybernetics, Saint Petersburg, designed by B. I. Artiushin and S. V. Savin.
- Te Rata Bridge, King Country, New Zealand (collapses 1994).

== Awards ==
- Aga Khan Prize – Rifat Chadirji.
- AIA Gold Medal – Arthur Charles Erickson.
- Architecture Firm Award – Esherick Homsey Dodge & Davis.
- Grand prix national de l'architecture – Adrien Fainsilber.
- Pritzker Prize – Gottfried Boehm.
- Prix de l'Équerre d'Argent – Adrien Fainsilber.
- RAIA Gold Medal – Richard Butterworth.
- RIBA Royal Gold Medal – Arata Isozaki.
- Twenty-five Year Award – Solomon R. Guggenheim Museum.

== Deaths ==
- February 6 – Minoru Yamasaki, American architect (born 1912)
- February 21 – Mart Stam, Dutch architect (born 1899)
- May – Ben-Ami Shulman, Israeli-American architect (born 1907)
- Werner Schindler, Swiss architect (born 1905)
