= House of Soviets (Kaliningrad) =

Unfinished building in Kaliningrad, Russia

Coordinates: 54.7106°N 20.5128°E

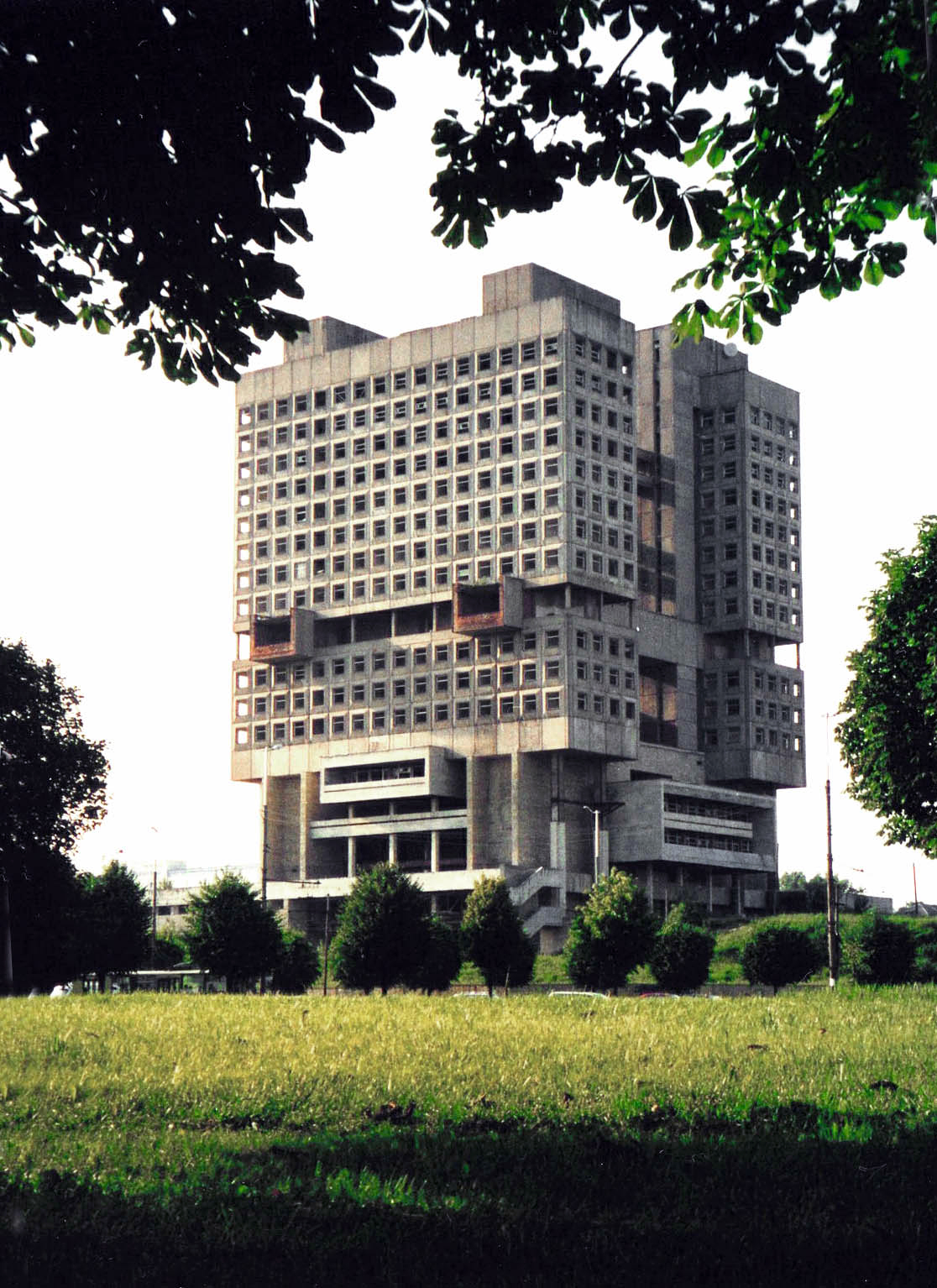
The unfinished shell of the building in 2002

The House of Soviets (Russian: Дом Советов, romanized: Dom Sovetov) was an unfinished building in the center of the city of Kaliningrad, Kaliningrad Oblast, an exclave of Russia. It was a 21-storey building, 50 meters (160 ft) in length. Residents of the city often referred to it as the "buried robot" because its appearance resembled the head of a giant robot buried in the ground up to the shoulders. Intended as the central administration building of the oblast, it was built on the original site of the 13th-century Königsberg Castle.

Construction of the building was never completed, and it lay empty throughout its existence. Demolition of the structure began in 2023, and was completed in August 2024.

== Location ==
The building was located in the central square of Kaliningrad, at the intersection of Shevchenko and Leninski Avenues. Although it is widely claimed that the House of Soviets was built directly on top of the site of Königsberg Castle, it stood to the east, on the site of the castle's moat.

== History ==
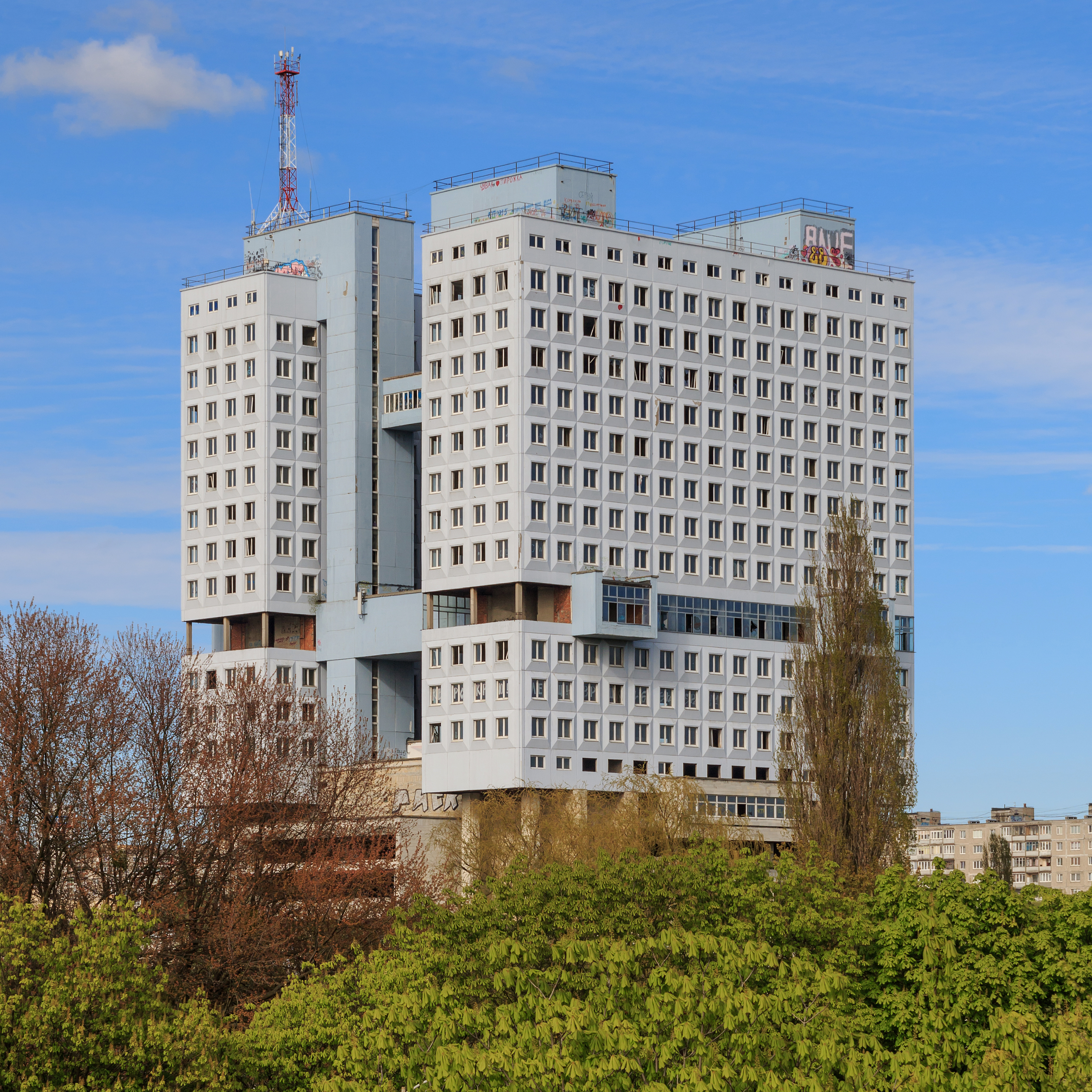
After 2005 paint job

Königsberg Castle was severely damaged during the bombing of Königsberg in World War II. The city came under the control of the Soviet Union after the war and the Soviet authorities decided against preserving the castle ruins. What remained of the castle was blown up and cleared away between 1967 and 1969.

The vision for the redevelopment was heavily influenced by works of Lúcio Costa and Oscar Niemeyer, specifically the development of the Brazilian city of Brasília. Two architectural competitions were held for the redevelopment of the area, in 1964 and 1974, which included design firms from Moscow and Leningrad and from the then Soviet-occupied Lithuania, Latvia and Estonia. The design chosen was by Yulian Schwarzbreim, a winner of the USSR State Prize and well respected in Russia, and his studio TsNIIEP.

Construction started in 1970 on what was intended to be the central administration building of the Kaliningrad Oblast. Development was stopped in 1985 after the regional authorities lost interest in the project, and the building remained unfinished. People had broken in over the years and painted graffiti inside and out.

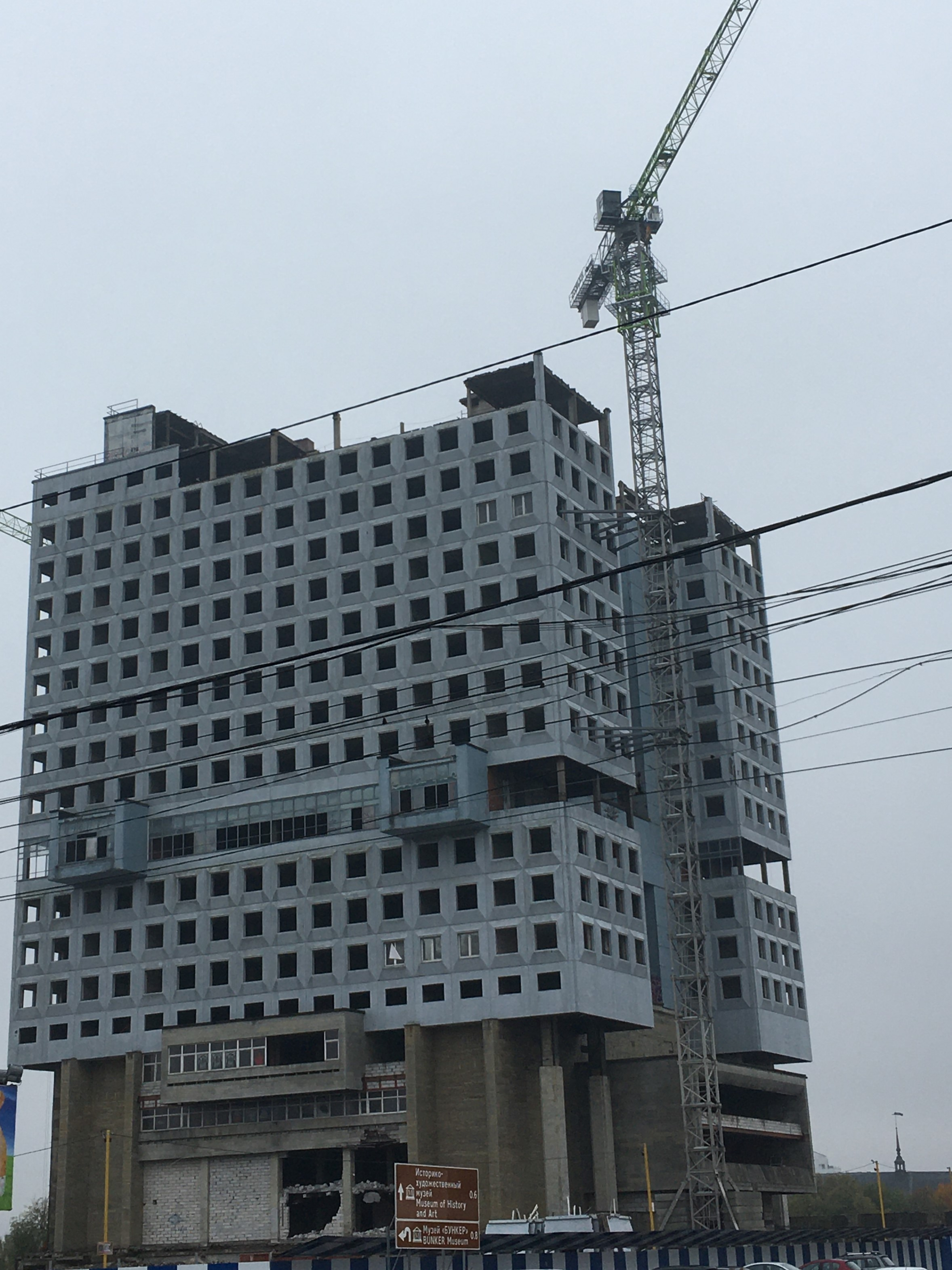
The demolition of the building's upper floors in October 2023.

In 2005, for Kaliningrad's 60th and Königsberg's 750th anniversary, also marked by a visit by Russian president Vladimir Putin, the exterior was painted light blue and windows were installed, though the interior remained unfinished and unusable. Some criticized the update as a modern Potemkin façade.

A proposal was made to recreate the castle in a modified form as a tourist attraction, as part of the Heart of the City project, which originally envisaged rebuilding the House of Soviets as a hotel and conference center. While some considered the building to be one of the worst examples of post-war Soviet architecture, the House of Soviets was seen by others as an important work of Brutalist architecture, particularly before its pastel paint job.

Demolition of the building was announced on 12 November 2020, and was then expected to begin in early 2021. Fragments of the torn-down building were considered being given away or sold as souvenirs. The demolition process began in May 2023, and the building was completely demolished by August 2024.

== See also ==
- House of Press, unfinished project in Riga, Latvia
- Ryugyong Hotel, unfinished project in Pyongyang, North Korea
- Robot Building in Bangkok, Thailand
