= Heart of the City =

Heart of the City may refer to:

== Music ==
- Heart of the City (album), a 1975 album by Barrabás
- Heart of the City, an album by Dave Kelly
- Heart of the City, an album by Tom Grant
- Live...in the Heart of the City, an album by Whitesnake

=== Songs ===
- "Heart of the City", a 1976 song by Nick Lowe, the B-side of "So It Goes"; covered by Dave Edmunds in 1978, and Dr. Feelgood in 1991
- "Heart of the City", a 1986 song by Frank Mills
- "Ain't No Love in the Heart of the City", a 1978 song covered as "Heart of the City" by Jay-Z

== Other uses ==
- Heart of the City, Sheffield, an area in Sheffield, England
- Heart of the City (Kaliningrad), a redevelopment project in Kaliningrad, Russia
- Heart of the City (comic strip), a comic strip by Mark Tatulli and Christina 'Steenz' Stewart
- Heart of the City (TV series), a 1980s police procedural series
- Big Town or Heart of the City, a 1950s television series
- Bu Şehir Arkandan Gelecek or Heart of the City, a 2017 Turkish television drama
- Burnsville Heart of the City station, a bus rapid transit station in Minnesota, United States
