= Sumet Jumsai =

Thai architect

- สุเมธ ชุมสาย ณ อยุธยา
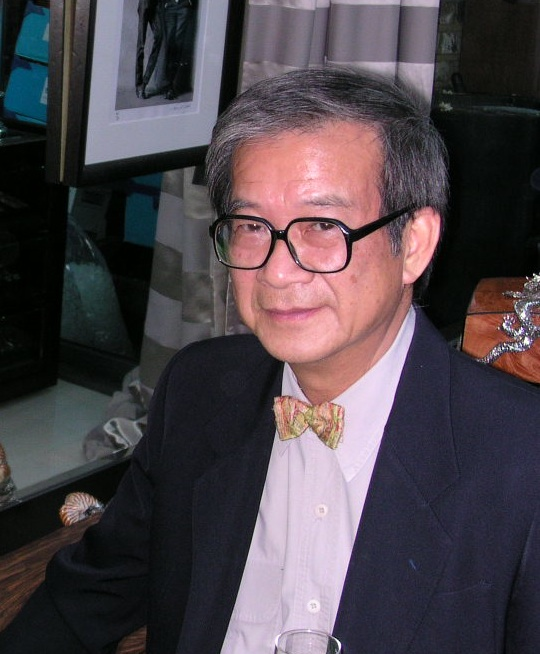
- Born: 1939 (age 86–87); Bangkok, Thailand
- Occupations: Architect and painter
- Awards: National Artist 1998; Académie d'architecture 2002
- Buildings: Robot Building

Sumet Jumsai na Ayudhya (Thai: สุเมธ ชุมสาย ณ อยุธยา) (born 1939 in Bangkok, Thailand) is a Thai architect. He was named a National Artist of Thailand in 1998, Honorary Fellow of The American Institute of Architects 2001, Member of the French Académie d'Architecture 2002, Fellow Commoner, St.John's College, Cambridge, 2003 and 2013, where he earlier obtained a doctorate degree in architecture and Chevalier de l'Ordre des Arts et des Lettres (France) 2008. He is also a painter and author.

== Works ==
Image	Architecture	Location	Date
	British Council Building	Bangkok	1970
	Science Museum	Bangkok	1976
	Robot Building	Bangkok	1986
	International School Bangkok	Bangkok	1991
	Nation Building	Bangkok	1991
	Privy Council Chambers	Bangkok	2004
	S.31 - Bird Building	Bangkok	2009
	Siriraj Hospital - Srisavarindhira Building	Bangkok	2011
	New Art Museum (NAM), Langsuan	Bangkok	2015
Image	Painting		Date
	"Jeepney", Paris, 23.II.2000. Oil and oil pastel on canvas 80 x 100 cm		2000
	"Boats", 10.III.2005. Oil on canvas 70 x 90 cm		2005
	"Toy", 14.III.2010. Felt pen and oil on canvas 90 x 70 cm		2010
	"Me 6", 16.III.2014. Oil on canvas 60.5 x 76 cm		2014
	"Window, 25 Rue de Lille", 2014. Oil on canvas 80 x 60 cm		2014
