= Königsberg Castle =

Castle in Kaliningrad, Russia

- German: Königsberger Schloss; Russian: Кёнигсбергский замок
- Kaliningrad (formerly Königsberg)
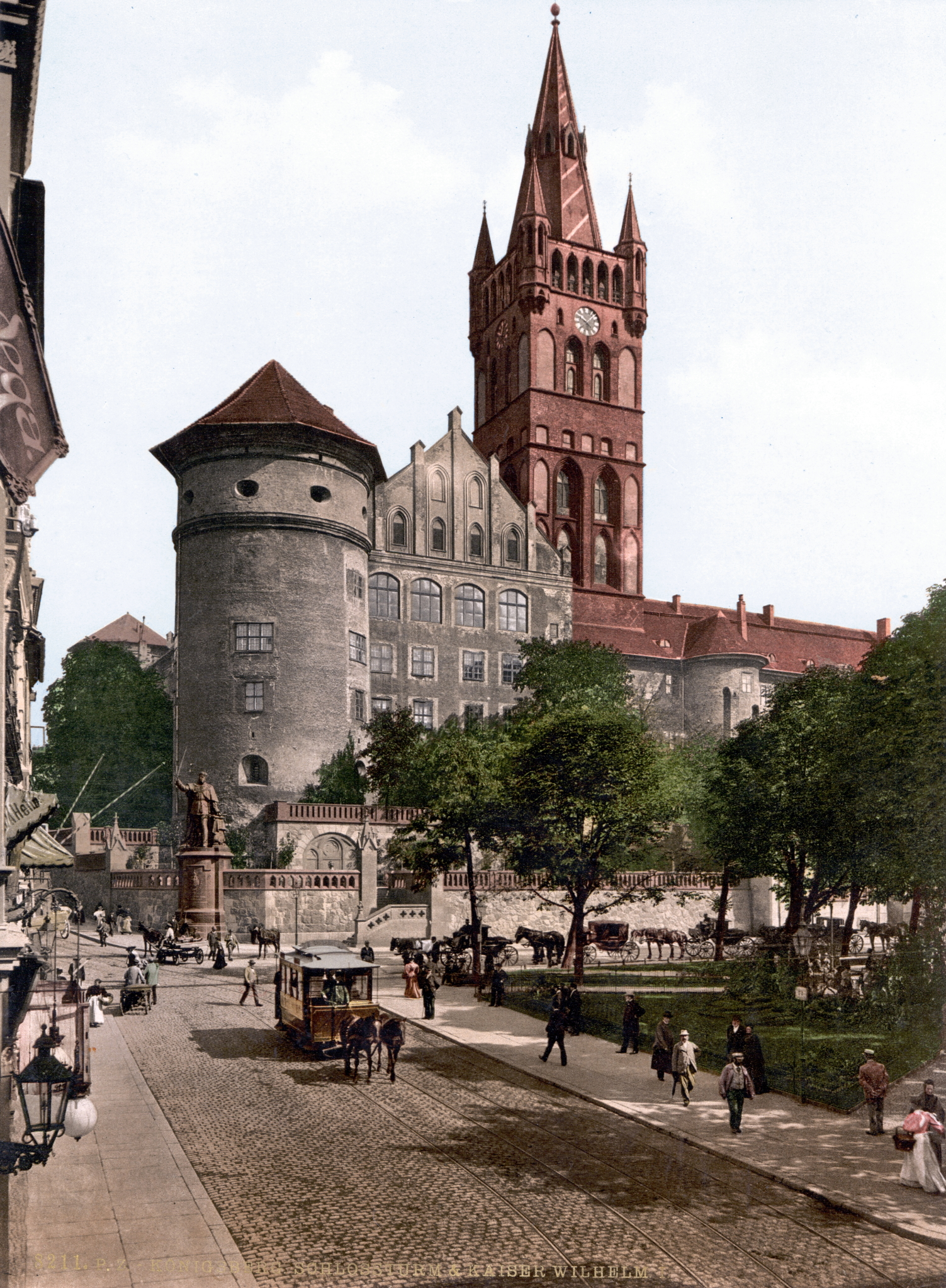
- Königsberg Castle, 1895

Location
- Königsberg Castle (German Empire) Königsberg Castle (Kaliningrad Oblast) Königsberg Castle (Europe)
- Coordinates: 54°42′36.78″N 20°30′38.84″E

Site history
- Built: 1255
- Demolished: 1968–1969

Königsberg Castle (Russian: Кёнигсбергский замок, romanized: Kyonigsbergskiy zamok, German: Königsberger Schloss) was the seat of the grand masters of the Teutonic Order and of the dukes and kings of Prussia in the city of Königsberg (since 1946 Kaliningrad, Russia). The original fortress on the site was built by the Teutonic Knights in the 1250s, then enlarged and rebuilt into a castle over the following centuries. The castle was severely damaged during World War II, although its exterior walls remained structurally intact. After the war, the remains of the castle were periodically demolished by the Soviet government, with the last section being destroyed in 1968. Königsberg and the surrounding territories of East Prussia had become Kaliningrad Oblast, a part of the Soviet Union, in 1946.

The House of Soviets was built where the castle had stood, but the building was never completed and remained unused for decades before it was torn down in 2024.

== History ==
After conquering the area in 1255, the Teutonic Knights constructed a provisional wooden and earthworks fort. By 1257, a new stone Ordensburg castle was being constructed. The castle was greatly enlarged and refortified in several stages between the 16th and 18th centuries.

The fortress, later designated a castle, was the residence of the Grand masters of the Teutonic Order and later for Prussian rulers. In 1635, Polish King Władysław IV Vasa resided at the castle during his stay in the city as the suzerain of Ducal Prussia. In 1734–1736, it was the place of stay of Polish King Stanisław Leszczyński during the War of the Polish Succession.

The 1815 Encyclopædia Britannica refers to "the magnificent palace in which is a hall 83.5 m long and 18 m broad without pillars to support it, and a handsome library. The Gothic tower of the castle is very high (100 m) and has 284 steps to the top, from where a great distance can be seen". The extensive building was enclosed in a large quadrangle and situated almost in the centre of the city. The west wing contained the Schloßkirche, or palace church, where Frederick I was crowned in 1701 and William I in 1861. The arms emblazoned upon the walls and columns were those of members of the Order of the Black Eagle. Above the church was the 83 m long and 18 m high Hall of Muscovites, one of the largest halls in the Central Europe.

Until the latter part of World War II, the apartments of the Hohenzollerns and the Prussia Museum (north wing, Prussia-Sammlung) were open to the public daily. Among other things, the museum accommodated 240,000 exhibits of the Prussian collection, a collection of the Königsberg State and University Library, as well as many paintings by the artist Lovis Corinth. In 1926, Friedrich Lahrs led an excavation of the castle courtyard. During World War II, various pieces of looted Russian art were stored there, possibly including parts of the Amber Room. An extensive collection of provincial archives was also housed there. The Blutgericht ('Blood Court'), a wine-selling tavern, was situated within the castle. An image of Hans von Sagan was used as the castle's weathervane.

During the Second World War, the British bombing of Königsberg on 29/30 August 1944 reduced the castle to a burned-out shell. The thick outer walls were able to withstand both the bombing and the Soviet artillery barrages of the three-month long siege of the city that ended with the Battle of Königsberg in April 1945. The largely demolished Königsberg became part of the Soviet Union and was renamed Kaliningrad in 1946.

The ruins of the castle were periodically dynamited over the next several years, with the last remnants destroyed in 1968 on orders from Nikolai Konovalov, First Secretary of the regional Communist Party of the Soviet Union. The ruins of the nearby Königsberg Cathedral, which included the tomb of Immanuel Kant, were left standing, and, after the collapse of the Soviet Union, were rebuilt and restored in the late 1990s and early years of the 21st century.

== Current status ==
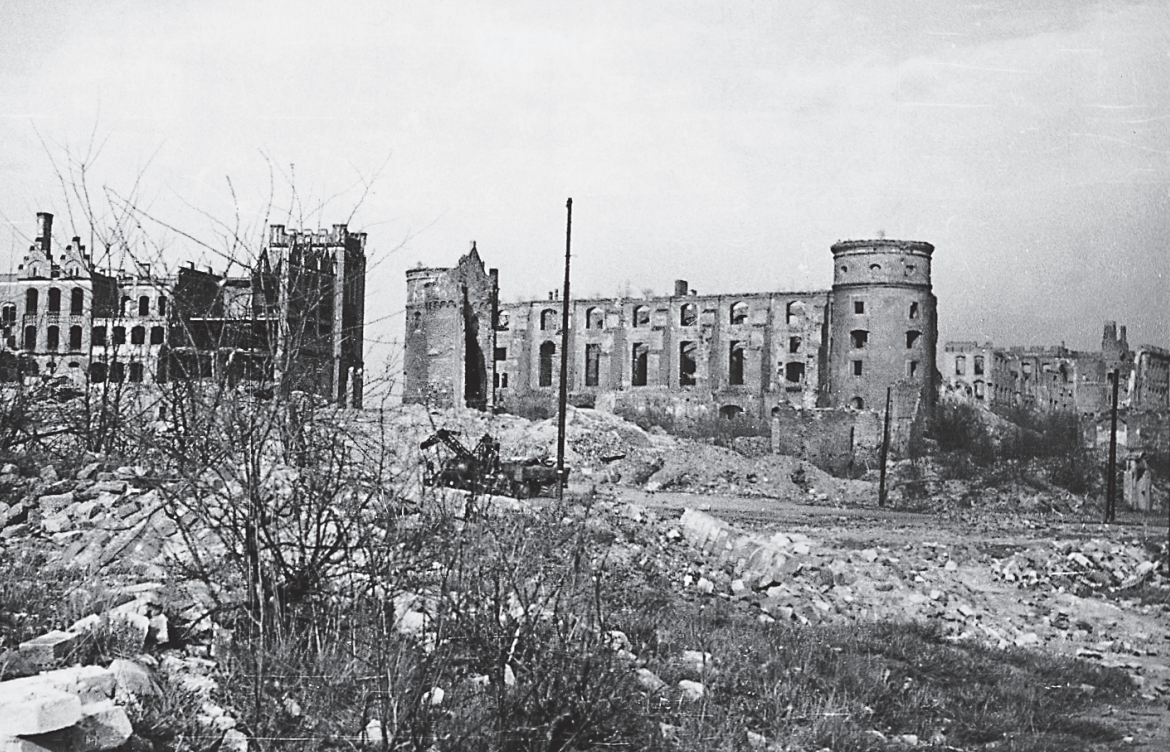
Castle ruins (centre), 1965

The centre square of Kaliningrad is on the site of the castle. Adjacent to the centre square on the filled-in moat was the "House of Soviets", which when construction began in 1970 was intended to be the central administration building of the Kaliningrad Oblast. Development stopped in the 1980s as the massive building gradually sank into the structurally unsound base caused by the collapse of tunnels in the old castle's subterranean levels. Many people called the building the "Revenge of the Prussians" or "The Monster".

In June 2010, the regional Minister of Culture, Mikhail Andreyev, announced that a referendum on the reconstruction of the castle would be held in the city in March 2011. Previously, it had been intended to hold the referendum in October 2010, but budgetary pressures caused a delay. The Kaliningrad city administration debated whether to rebuild the castle with the financial assistance of the Russian Department of Culture. In contrast to the Königsberger Dom (cathedral), there would be the difficult task of erecting the castle from scratch, so plans were dropped. Instead, the centre square was cobbled.

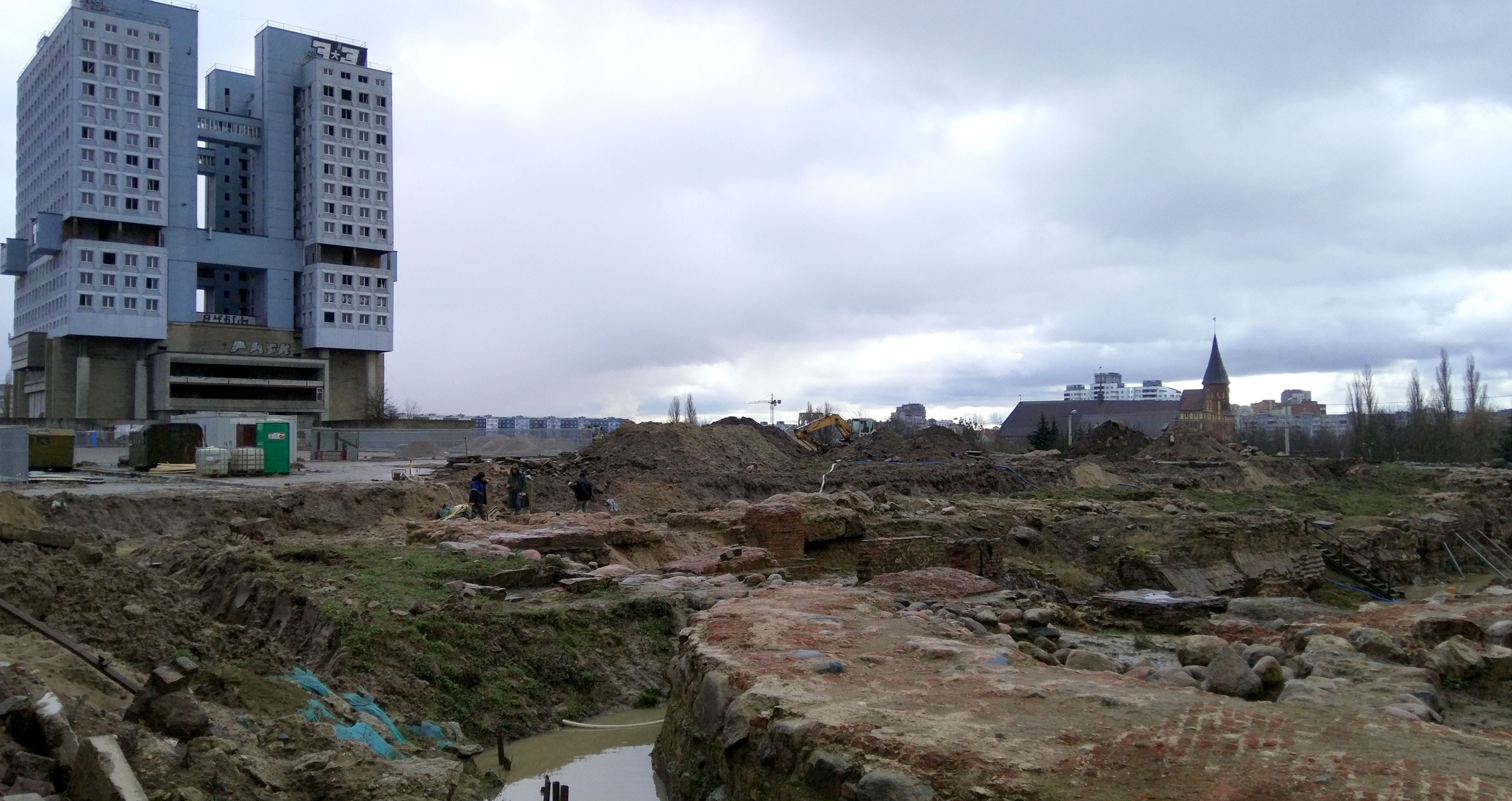
Excavations at the castle site, January 2018. The House of Soviets is in the background.

In 2001, the German magazine Der Spiegel financed the excavation of parts of the castle's cellar, which was carried out with the Kaliningrad Regional Museum of History and Arts. It was hoped that various buried treasures of the previous castle museum would be uncovered, and possibly the rest of the Amber Room. During the Second World War, the Amber Room was looted from Saint Petersburg to Königsberg by Nazi forces where it was installed in one of the halls of the Castle. There its traces were lost. Thousands of other items were discovered during the excavation. In June 2005, an occult silver casket with medals and amulets was found. It was planned that after completion of the excavation, parts of the castle's vaults would be made accessible as an open-air museum.

Demolition of the House of Soviets was announced on 12 November 2020. The demolition process began in May 2023, and the building's demolition was completed in August 2024.

== Gallery ==
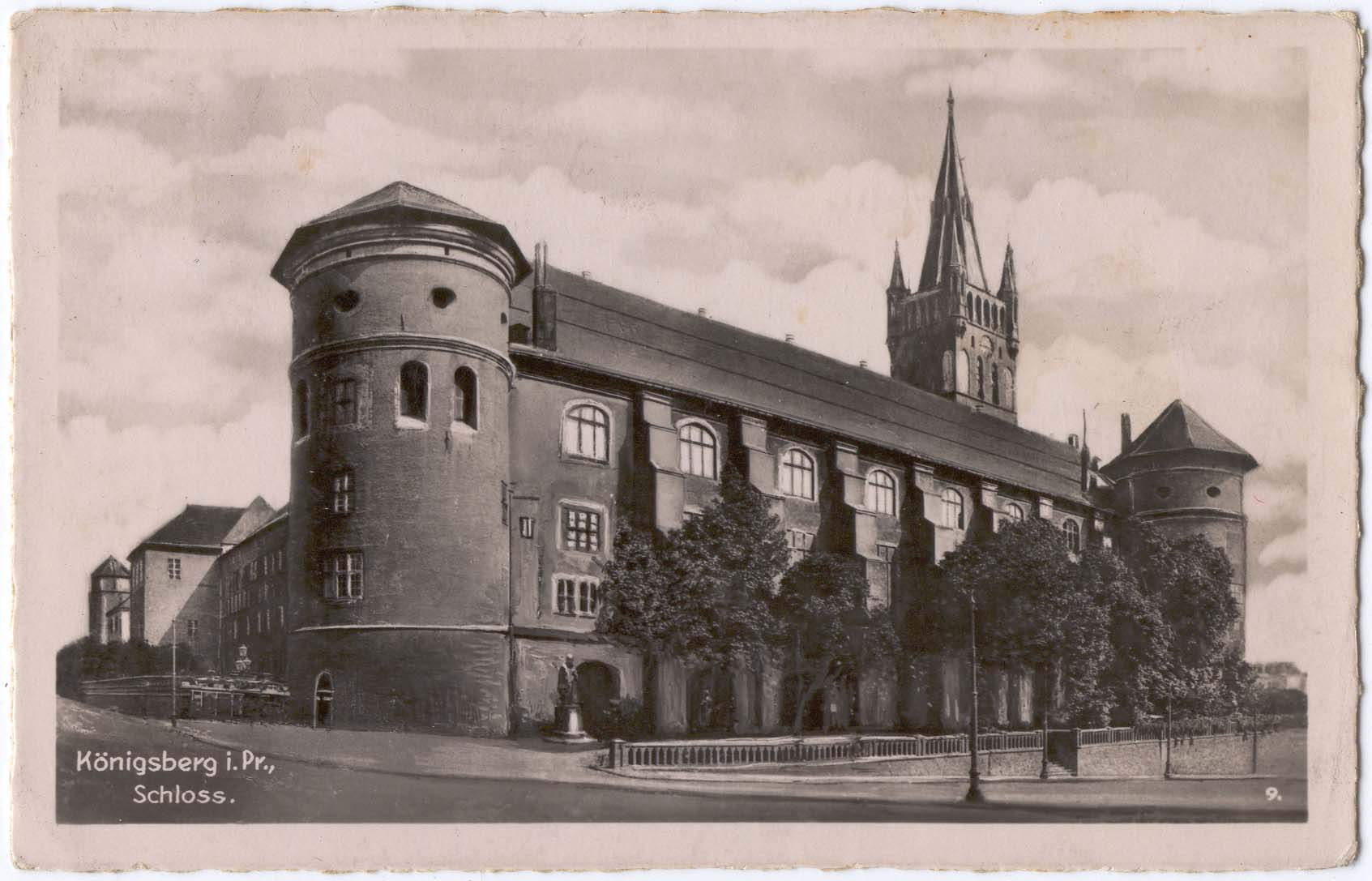
West face

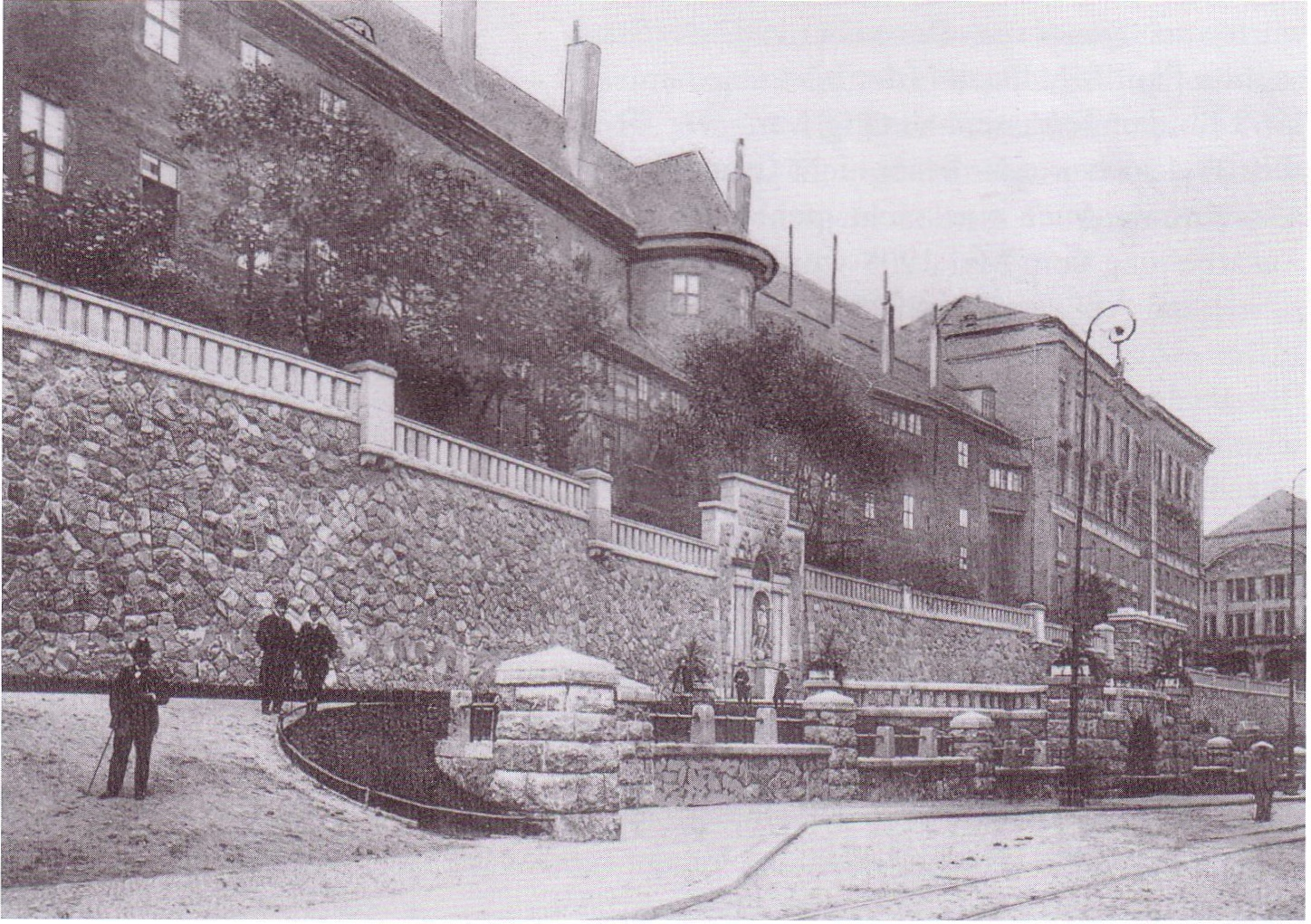
South face

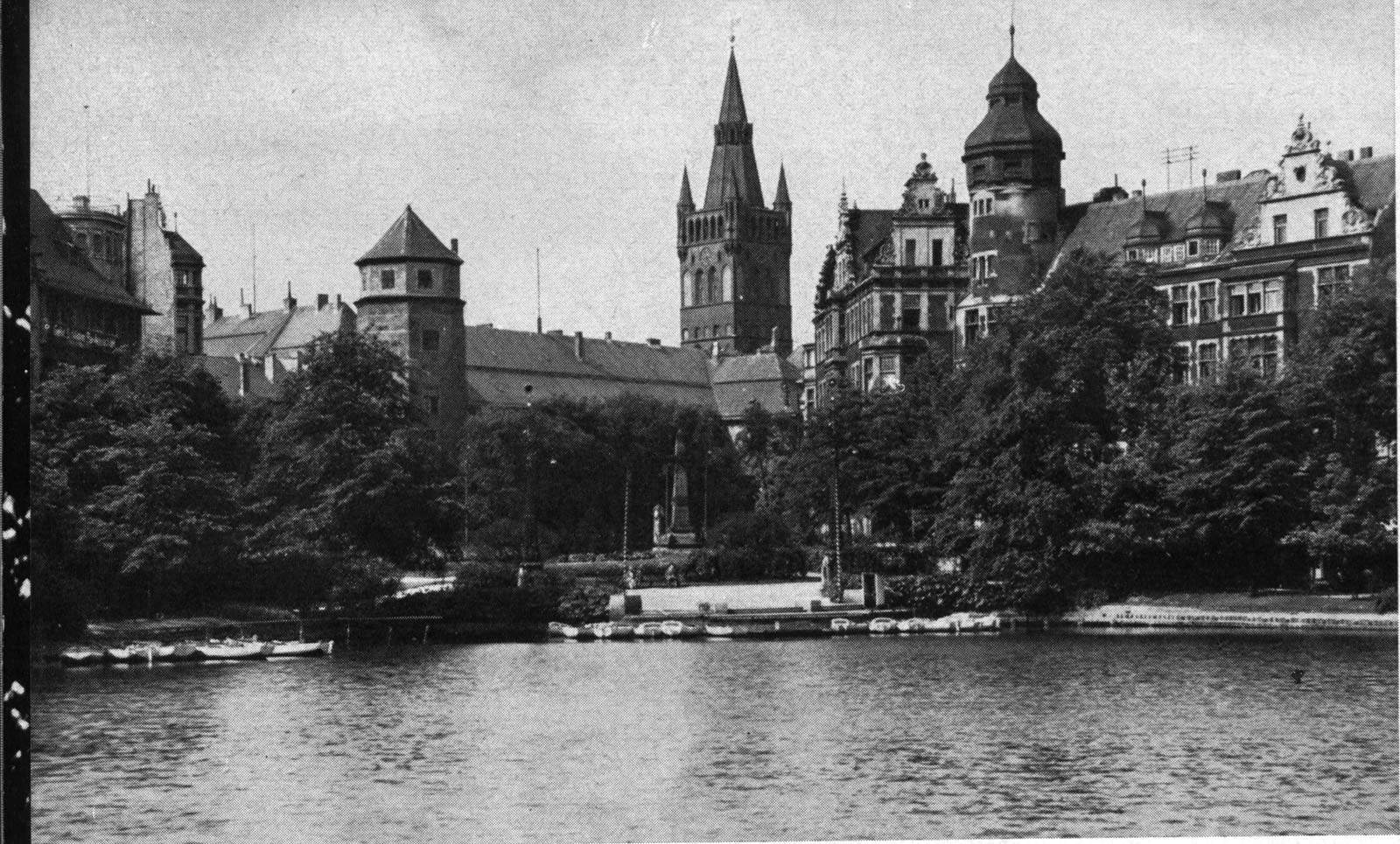
View from the Castle Pond

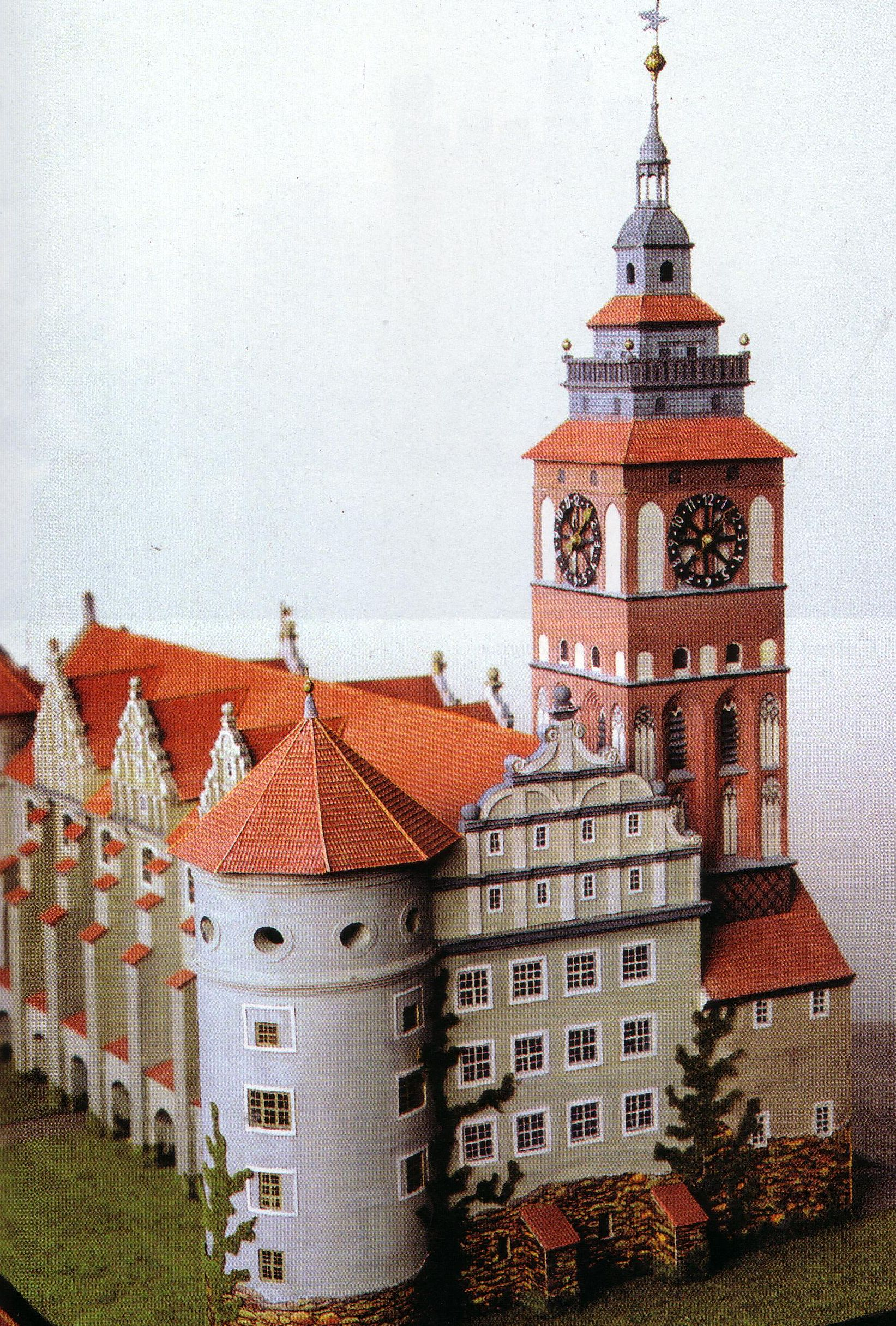
Castle church with two round towers, constructed in 1597

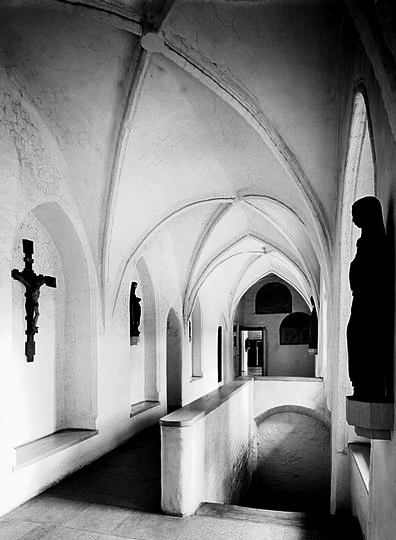
Firmari shelter

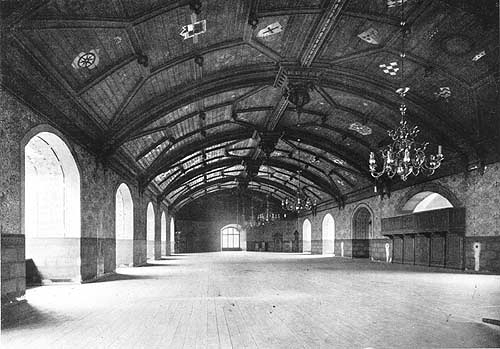
Interior view of the Hall of Muscovites

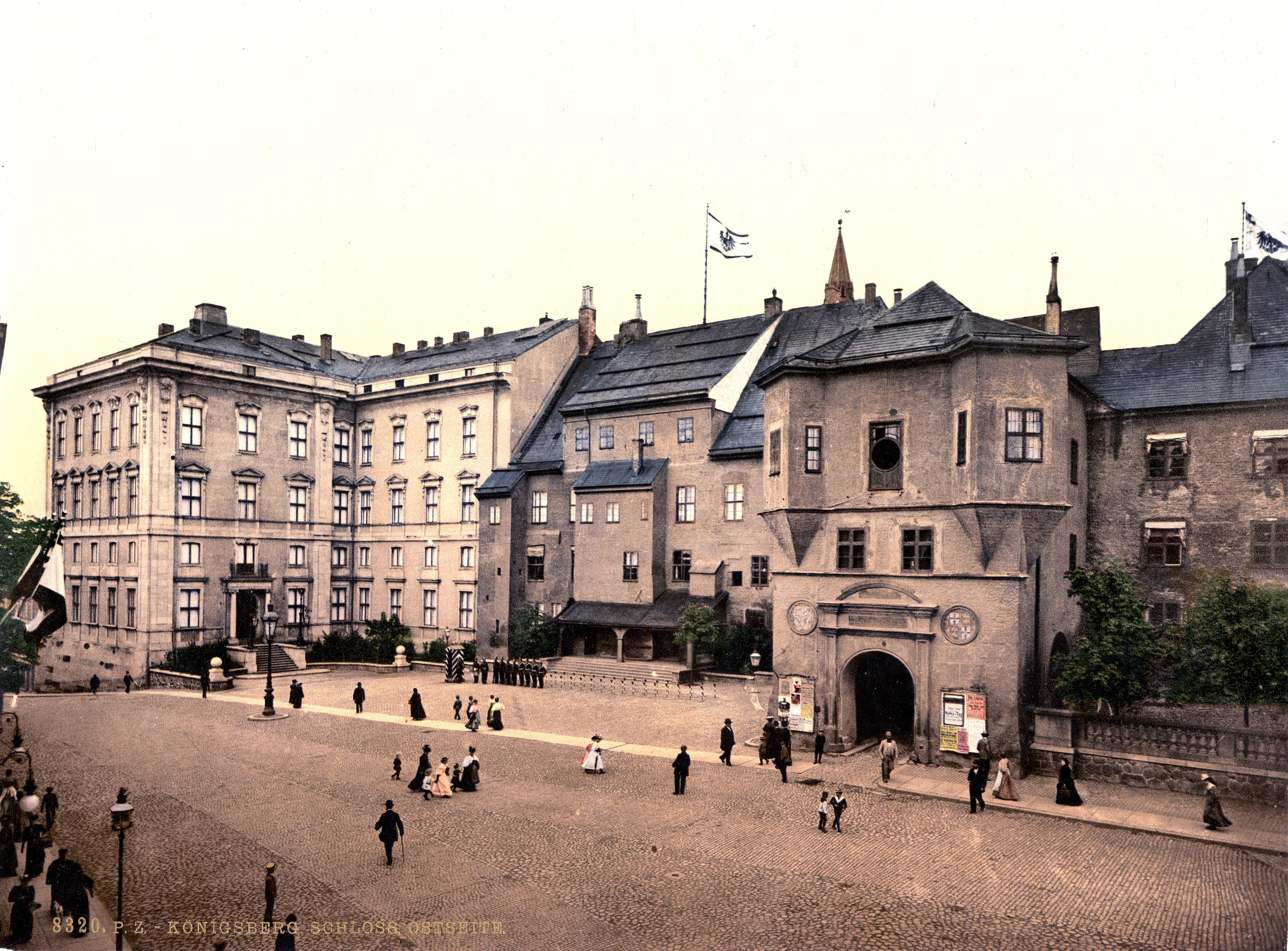
The later renovated facade of the castle

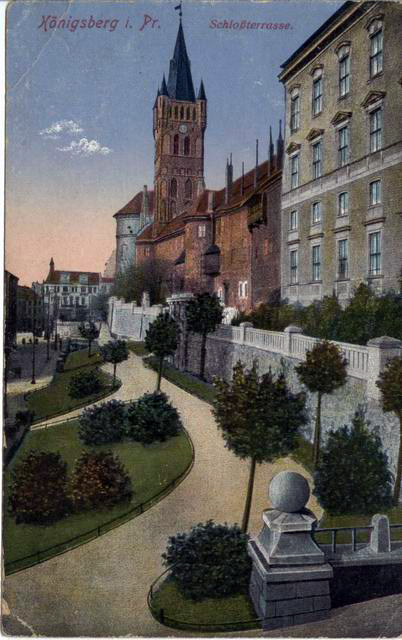
Castle terrace from southeast of the Pregel River

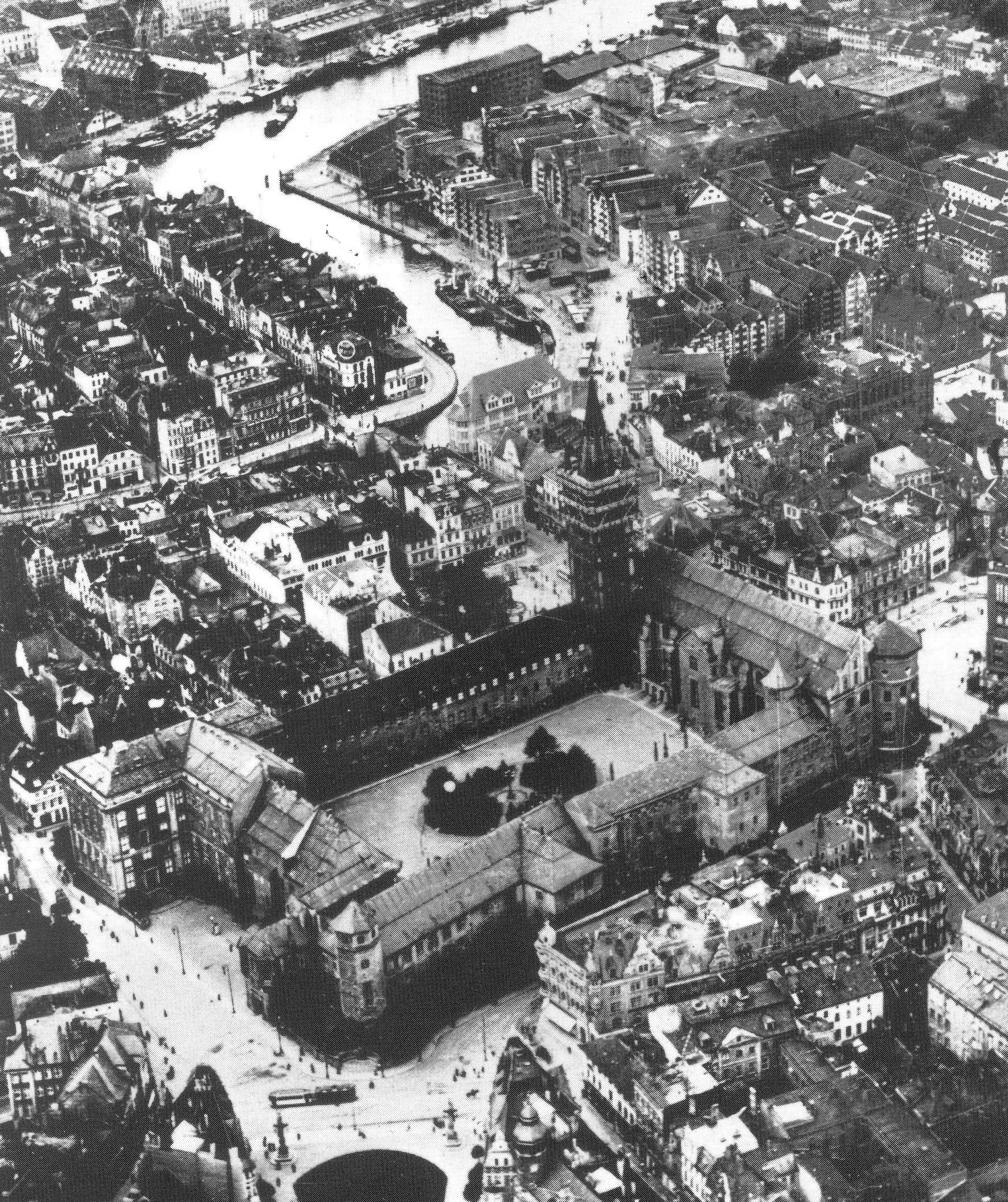
Aerial view of the castle from the side of the royal pond

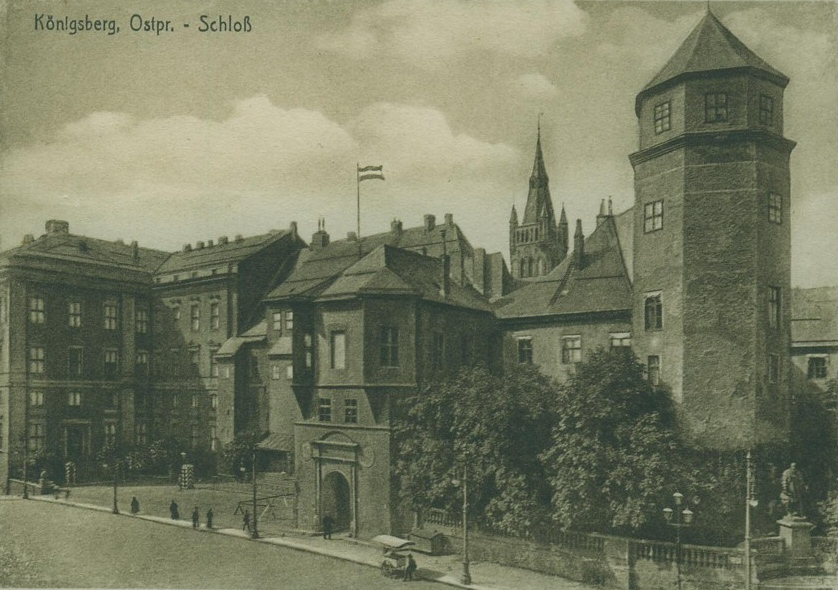
Northeast corner of the castle with the Haberturm and the monument to Duke Albrecht

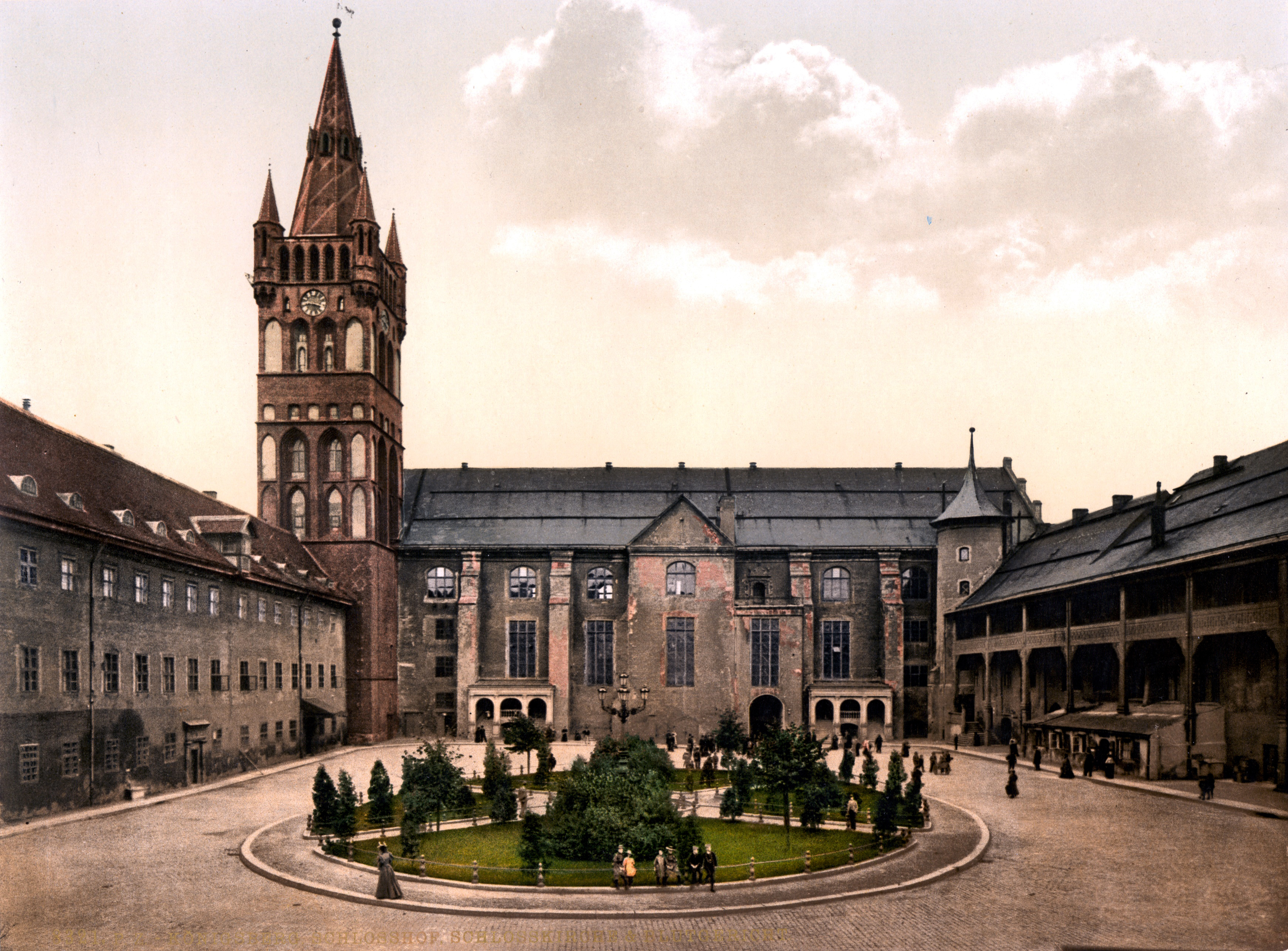
Königsberg Castle courtyard in c. 1900

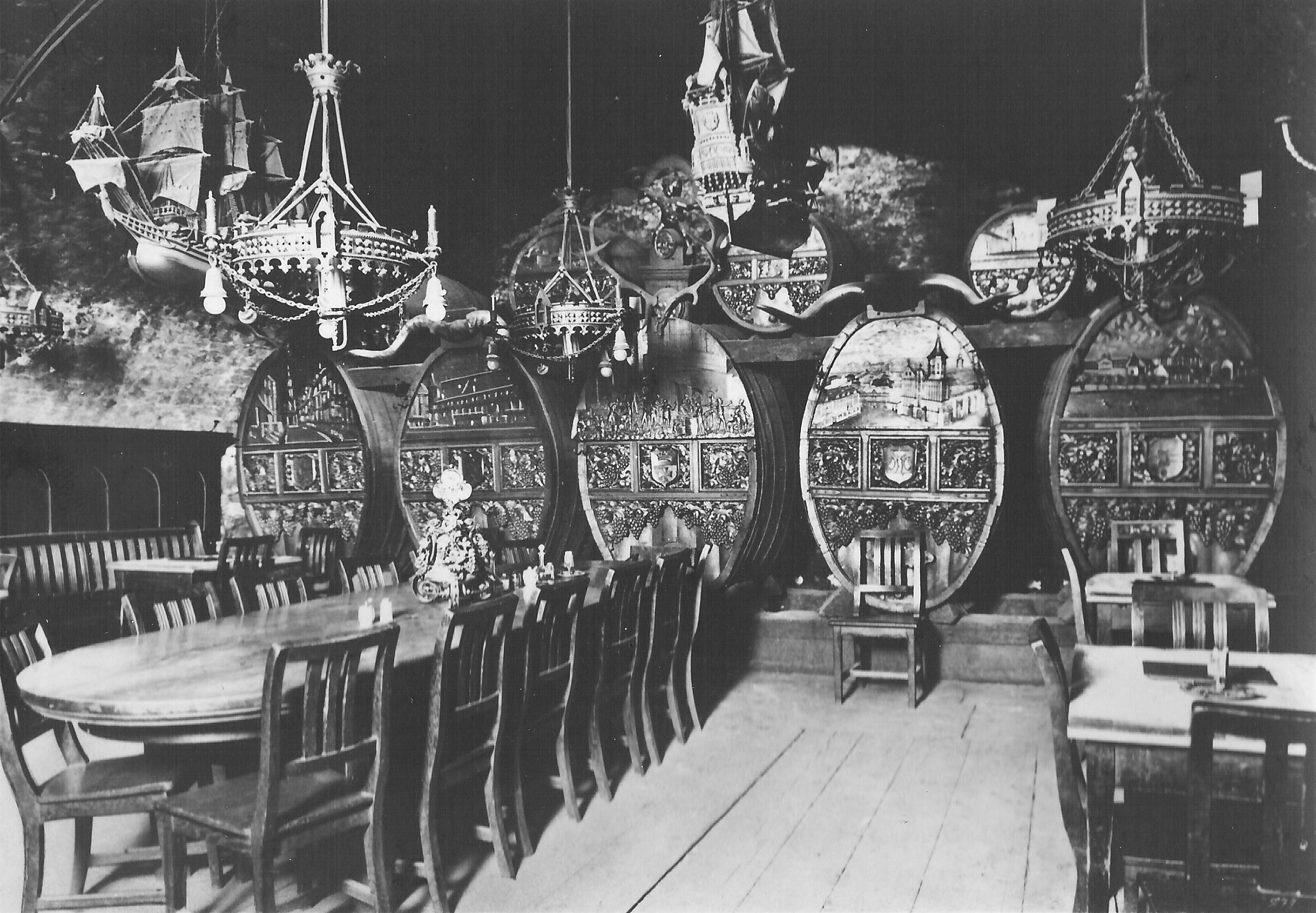
The famous restaurant "Blood Court" in the northern wing of the castle

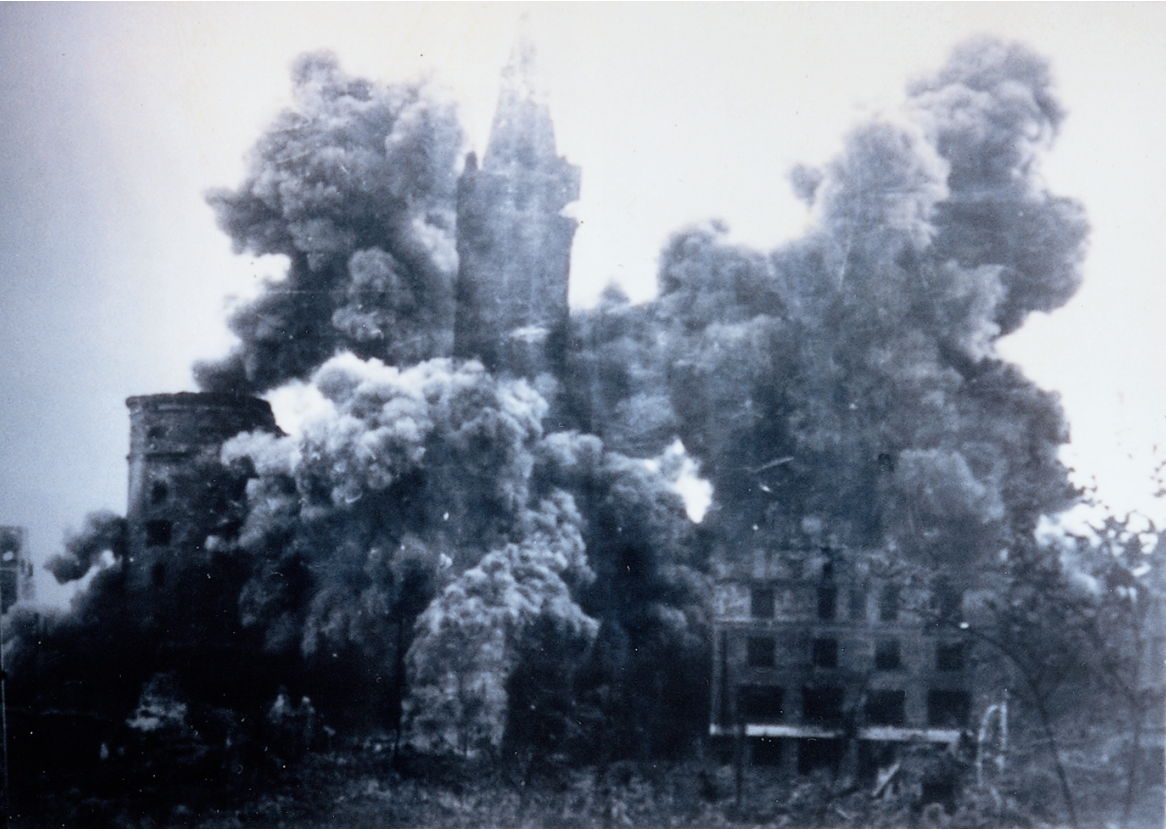
Demolition of the castle tower, 1959

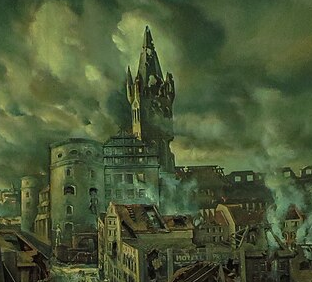
Shattered, smoking ruins of Königsberg Castle shortly before the fall of the city in 1945

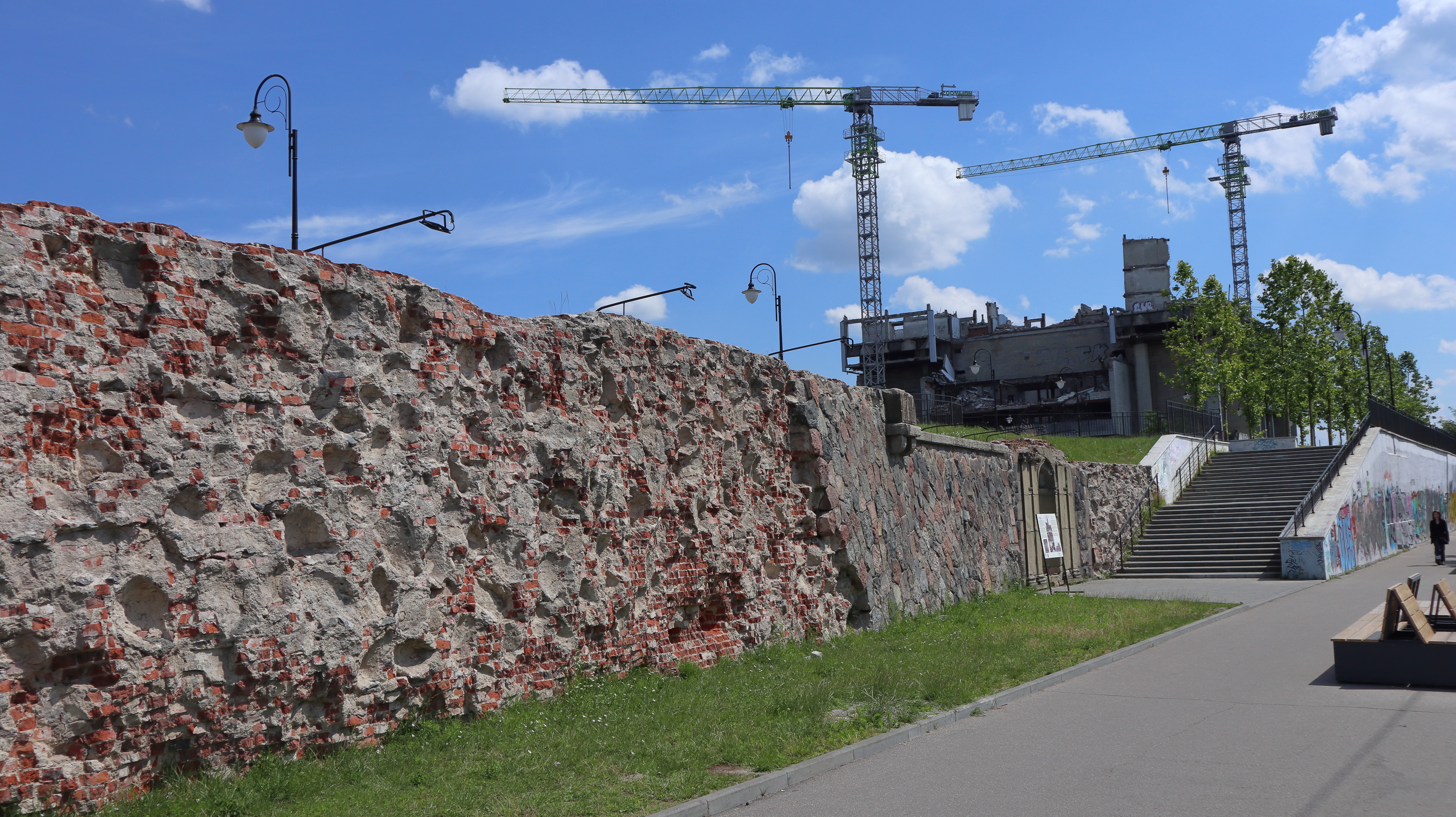
Remains of the castle south terrace in June 2024

== See also ==
- Potsdam Agreement
- Heart of the City (Kaliningrad)

== Bibliography ==
- Albinus, Robert (2002). Königsberg-Lexikon. Stadt und Umgebung (in German). Würzburg: Flechsig. ISBN 3-88189-441-1.
- Gause, Fritz (1996). Die Geschichte der Stadt Königsberg in Preußen (in German). Vol. 3 (2nd ed.). Cologne: Böhlau. ISBN 3-412-08896-X.
- Köster, Baldur (2000). Königsberg. Architektur aus deutscher Zeit (in German). Husum: Husum Druck. ISBN 3-88042-923-5.
- Manthey, Jürgen (2005). Königsberg – Geschichte einer Weltbürgerrepublik (in German). Munich: Hanser. ISBN 3-446-20619-1.
- Mühlpfordt, Herbert Meinhard (2004). Wörster, Peter (ed.). Unsterbliches Königsberger Schloß. Zehn Essays (in German). Frankfurt: Peter Lang. ISBN 3-631-39916-2.
- Rohde, Alfred (1942) [First published 1933]. Das Schloß in Königsberg (Pr.) und seine Sammlungen (in German). Vol. 5. Berlin: Auflage.
- Strunz, Gunnar (2006). Königsberg entdecken. Zwischen Memel und frischem Haff (in German). Berlin: Trescher. ISBN 3-89794-071-X.
- Wagner, Wulf D. (2008). Das Königsberger Schloss. Eine Bau- und Kulturgeschichte: Von der Gründung bis zur Regierung Friedrich Wilhelms I. (1255-1740). Das Königsberger Schloss. Eine Bau- und Kulturgeschichte. (in German). Vol. 1. Regensburg: Schnell & Steiner. ISBN 978-3-7954-1936-3.
- Wagner, Wulf D.; Lange, Heinrich (2011). Das Königsberger Schloss. Eine Bau- und Kulturgeschichte: Von Friedrich dem Großen bis zur Sprengung (1740–1967/68). Das Schicksal seiner Sammlungen nach 1945 (in German). Vol. 2. Regensburg: Schnell & Steiner. ISBN 978-3-7954-1953-0.
