= 701 Brickell Avenue =

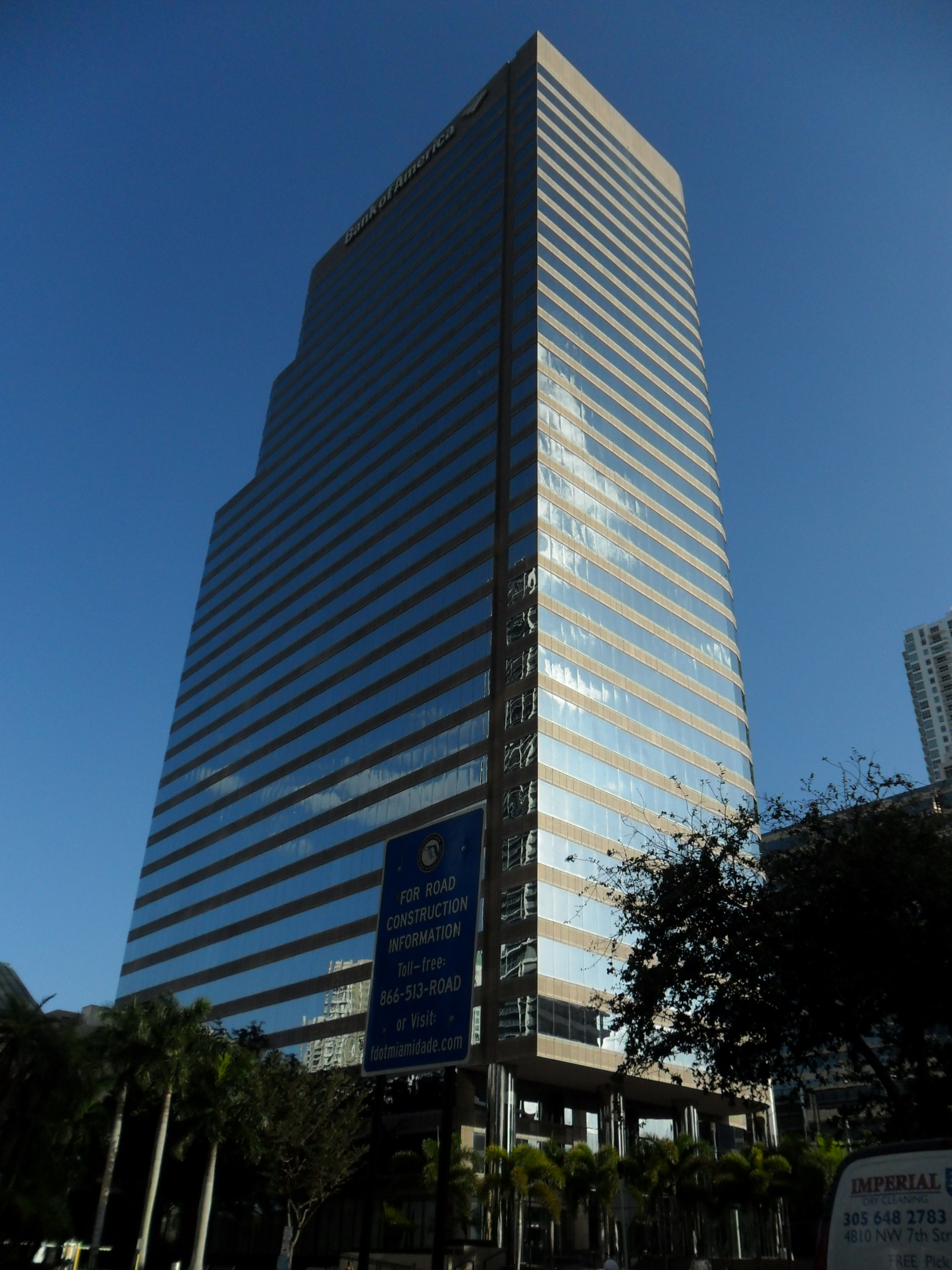
- 701 Brickell Avenue as seen from Brickell Avenue
- Interactive map of the 701 Brickell Avenue area
- Former names: Lincoln Center

General information
- Type: Office
- Location: 701 Brickell Avenue, Miami, Florida, United States
- Coordinates: 25.76682°N 80.19062°W
- Construction started: 1983
- Completed: 1986
- Opening: 1986

Height
- Roof: 450 ft (140 m)

Technical details
- Floor count: 34

Design and construction
- Architects: Hellmuth, Obata and Kassabaum

701 Brickell Avenue is an office skyscraper in the Brickell district of Miami, Florida, United States. It is located on Brickell Avenue in the northern Brickell Financial District, just three blocks from Biscayne Bay. The tower was built in 1986 and opened as the Lincoln Center, it held that title until 2004. It currently goes by its address, which is 701 Brickell, because there was already a building in Miami at the time that claimed the Bank of America appellation, and therefore it could not take that name. However, that specific building has since been renamed the Miami Tower. The building is currently owned by TIAA–CREF, which purchased it in November 2002.

== Specifications ==
The building is 450 ft (150 m) tall, and contains 34 floors. When built, it was in the top ten tallest buildings in Miami. Now, however, it has been dwarfed by much taller surrounding buildings which have been built as part of the recent building booms in Miami in the mid 2000s, the mid to late 2010s, and the 2020s. The building contains 677,677 rentable square feet of Class A office space.

== Gallery ==
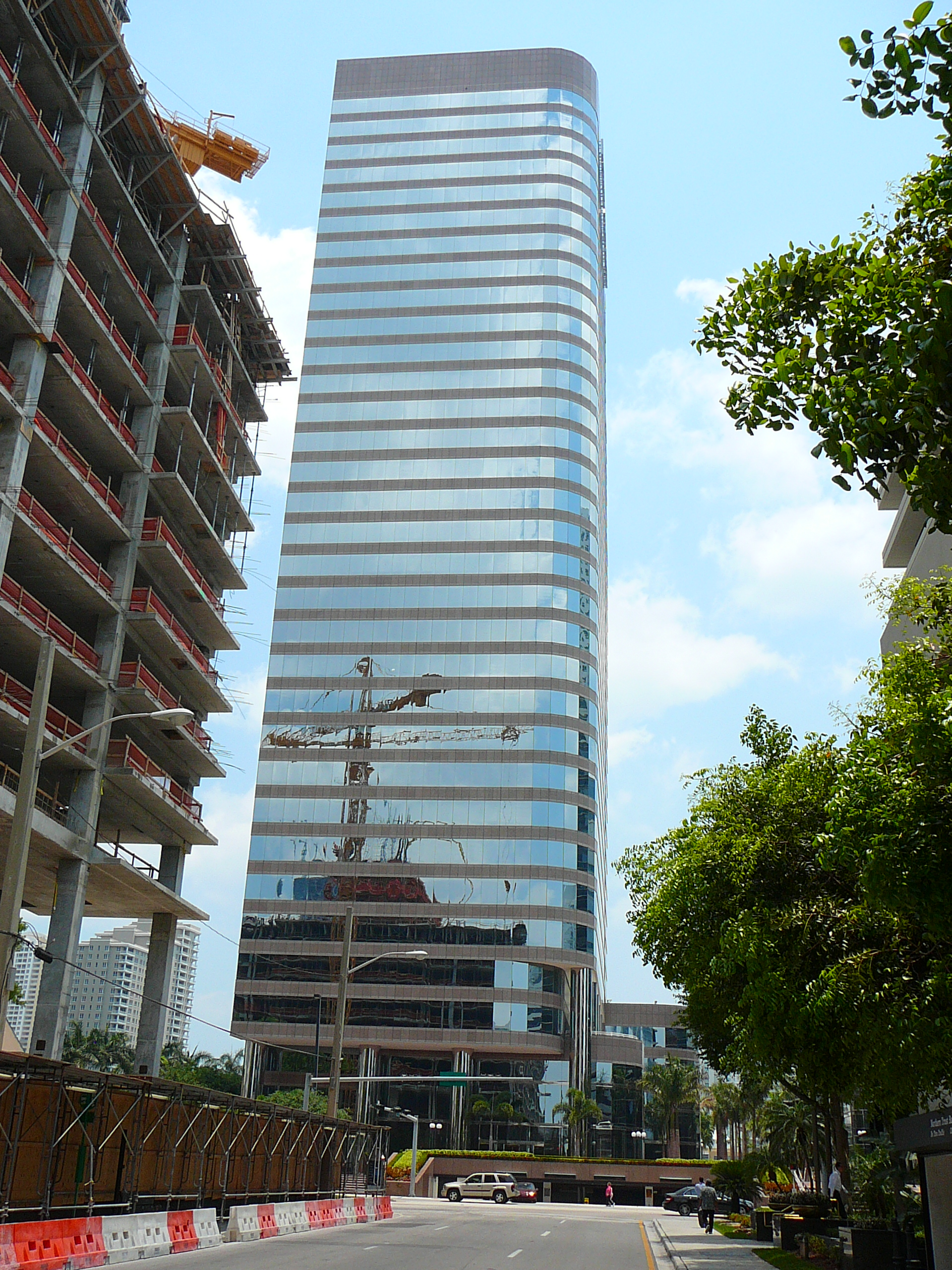
From the west

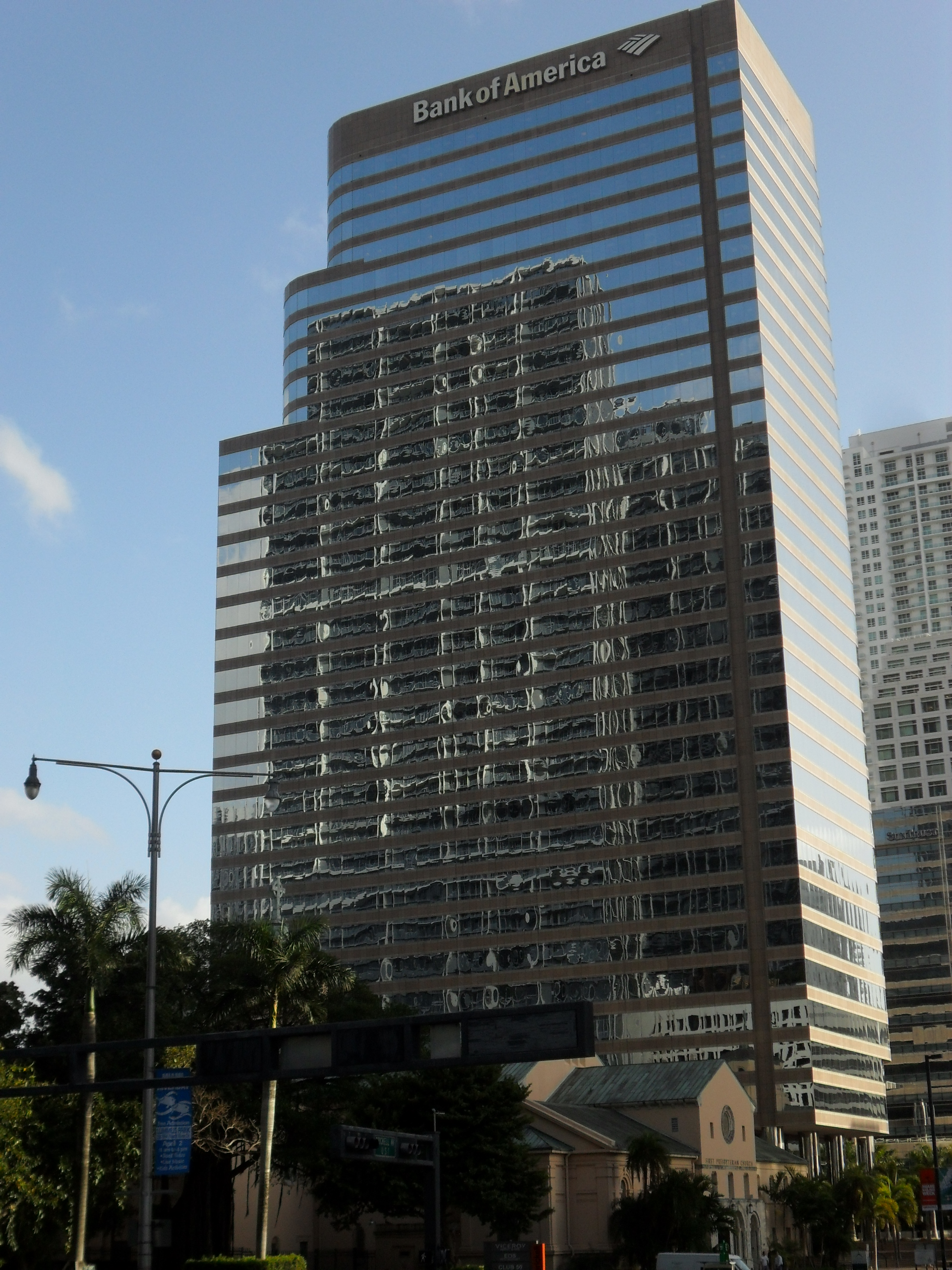
From the north

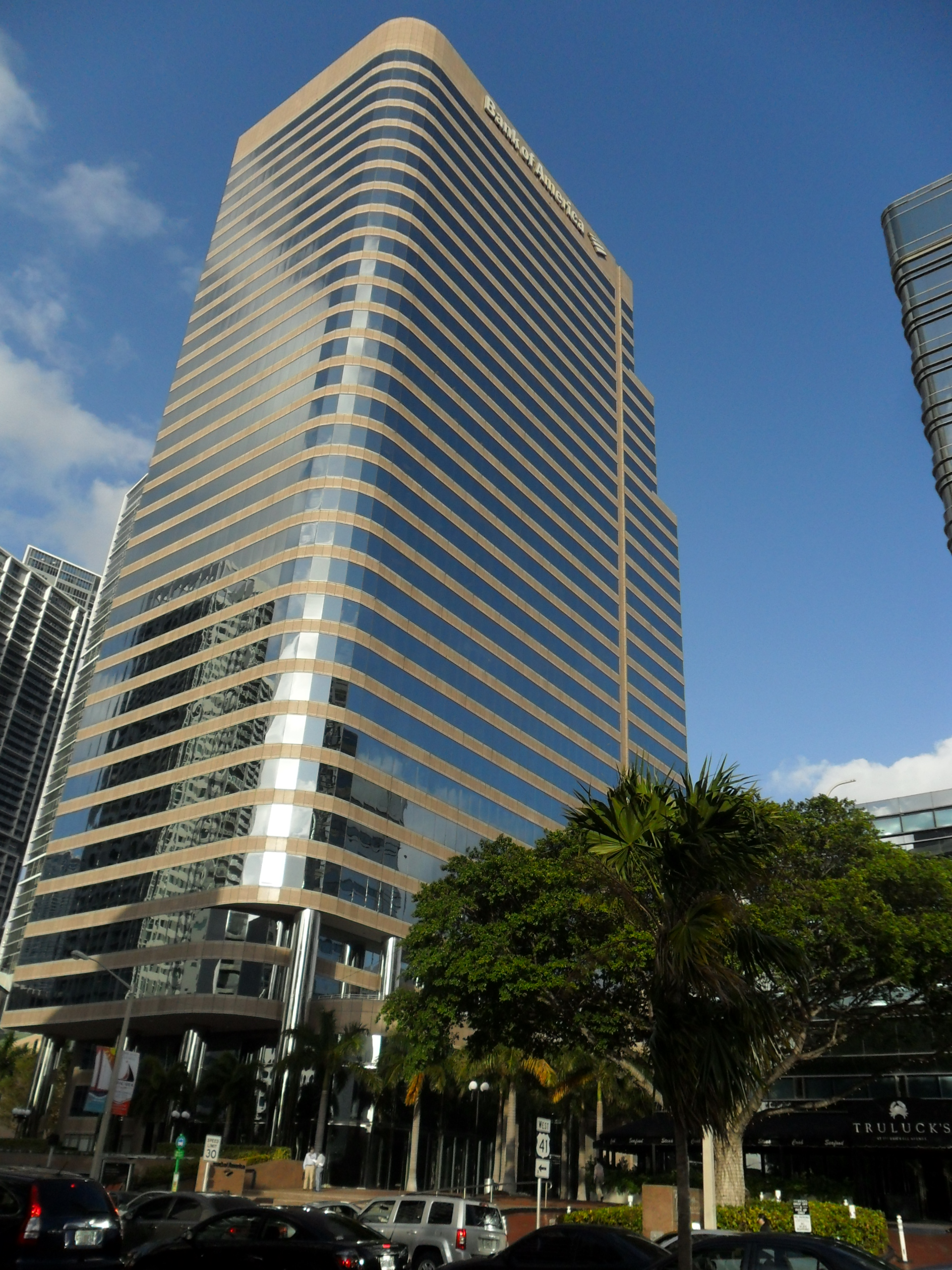
From the southwest

== See also ==
- List of tallest buildings in Miami
