= Heart of the City (Kaliningrad) =

Proposed urban development project in Kaliningrad, Kaliningrad Oblast, Russia

Coordinates: 54.7093°N 20.5114°E

The Heart of the City is a long-term project aiming at the redevelopment of the historic centre of Kaliningrad, Russia the area surrounding the former Königsberg Castle and the House of Soviets. In 2013, the Non-governmental organization Urban Planning Bureau "Heart of the City" (Russian name: Градостроительное бюро «Сердце города») was founded by the Kaliningrad Regional Government to serve as a project implementation unit. In 2016, the Bureau was shut down by organisational founders.

== About ==
The project emerged as a joint initiative of the members of the Ministry of Culture working under the leadership of the Governor of Kaliningrad Region, Nikolay Tsukanov. The project was implemented in close cooperation with the Government of Kaliningrad Region, the Kaliningrad City Administration and the Kaliningrad Regional Branch Office of the Union of Architects of Russia. The project was led by Alexander Popadin, Kaliningrad-based expert, writer and architectural critic.

== Background ==
Because of severe damage during the Second World War and uncompleted Soviet town planning projects, the city centre of Kaliningrad remains virtually empty and undeveloped in terms of urban infrastructure and design. In 2012, after several years of public consultations held with Russian and foreign experts, the Kaliningrad Oblast Government launched a long-term program for the systematic regeneration of the historical part of the city, known for seven centuries of history as Königsberg and which still preserves some features of its original urban fabric. To implement the project named "Heart of the City", a "road map" was developed to cover the areas of the King's Mountain (Korolevskaya gora), the adjacent embankment of the Pregolya River and the Lower Lake.

== Activities ==
In 2013, the Historic and cultural study of the "Heart of the City" project areas was conducted to set the basis for further activities within the project. The researchers determined the boundaries of twelve historic areas (corresponding to former Königsberg city parts), analysed their historic and cultural assets, and made recommendations for their future development. The study was presented to the local authorities and discussed with professionals and the local community on numerous occasions.

In 2014, the Urban Planning Bureau "Heart of the City" organised and conducted an international architectural and urban planning competition for the Development Concept of the historic centre of Kaliningrad. The professional jury panel was represented by Bart Goldhoorn, Hans Stimmann, Barbara Engel, Rasmus Waern, Stephen Willacy, Olov Schultz, Alexander Lozhkin and Anna Brunow. The competition intended to find a new concept of the urban planning development of the area called "Korolevskaya Gora" (Germ. Königsberg) and its surroundings (in total 56 ha). The winner emerging out of this competition was the Saint Petersburg's team of architects "Studio 44" in partnership with St. Petersburg's Institute of Territorial Development. The winners proposed an individual development scenario that would "take the interplay between heritage and contemporary context to a totally new level." The former Altstadt would become a zone of archaeological research with a new medieval city growing on top of the ruined one. The reconstructed historic urban fabric and the strict regulations governing the height and the shape of the buildings, roof-slope angles and the use of finishing materials will generate echoes of something recognizably old-European. The Kneiphof Island is proposed to remain a park with the park alleys and landscape architecture reproducing the grid of the destroyed city blocks. The concept of Studio 44 became a Future Masterplanning category winner at the World Architecture Festival in 2015. The second prize was awarded to the consortium of companies Devillers et Associes (France) + Off-the-grid (Moscow, Russia) + Wall (Moscow, Russia); the two third prizes were won by the British architect Trevor Skempton and the Swedish studio "Hosper Sweden" AB. In 2015, the representatives of "Studio 44" and "Devillers et Associes"/"Off-The-Grid Studio" with the participation of the "Heart of the City" Bureau's experts jointly elaborated a consolidated planning concept (a masterplan) for the development of the project area which was repeatedly discussed with local authorities, architects and the general public.

The consolidated planning concept formed the basis for the revisions of the current urban planning documents concerning the historic centre of Kaliningrad and led to a new open international design competition "Post-castle" that was announced in May 2015. The competition sought to find an architectural image for a Historic and cultural complex on the grounds of the former Königsberg Castle that will accommodate a multifunctional concert hall, a museum of archaeology, a museum of the King's castle history and other functions. In the final round of the competition, 49 entries were submitted. The first prize was awarded to a young architect from Kaliningrad Anton Sagal (currently living in Italy). His design managed to combine all the requirements and particularly impressed the jury with the quality of the draft and the idea of creating several public spaces.

In 2016, the competition winner was contracted for a conceptual design of the Historic and cultural complex. The Urban Planning Bureau "Heart of the City" continued working closely with local authorities to ensure that the results of both competitions were incorporated in the urban planning documents for the project area. In February 2016, the local authorities announced plans to start archaeological excavations on the grounds of the former Königsberg Castle. The construction works were planned to begin with the West Wing of the cultural complex.

== Current situation (January 2017) ==
In October 2016, the local mass media published information that the Urban Planning Bureau "Heart of the City" was about to be shut down. A month later, the new Governor of the Kaliningrad region announced that "further project implementation will depend on public opinion and the future of the House of Soviets".
