= 1221 Brickell Building =

Building in Miami, Florida, United States

Coordinates: 25.7613°N 80.1913°W

The 1221 Brickell Building is a high-rise tower in downtown Miami, Florida. It is located in the Brickell area of Miami's financial district. It is on Brickell Avenue near Southeast 12th Street, three blocks west of Biscayne Bay. The building is known for its all-glass, tiered sides, and was completed in 1986. In 2005, the building lost many glass panels during Hurricane Wilma. It provides more than 600,000 square feet (56,000 m^{2}) of floor space, is 365 feet (111 m) tall, and has 28 floors. It is used entirely for offices and is one of Brickell's financial centers.
