= Robot Building =

Office building in Thailand

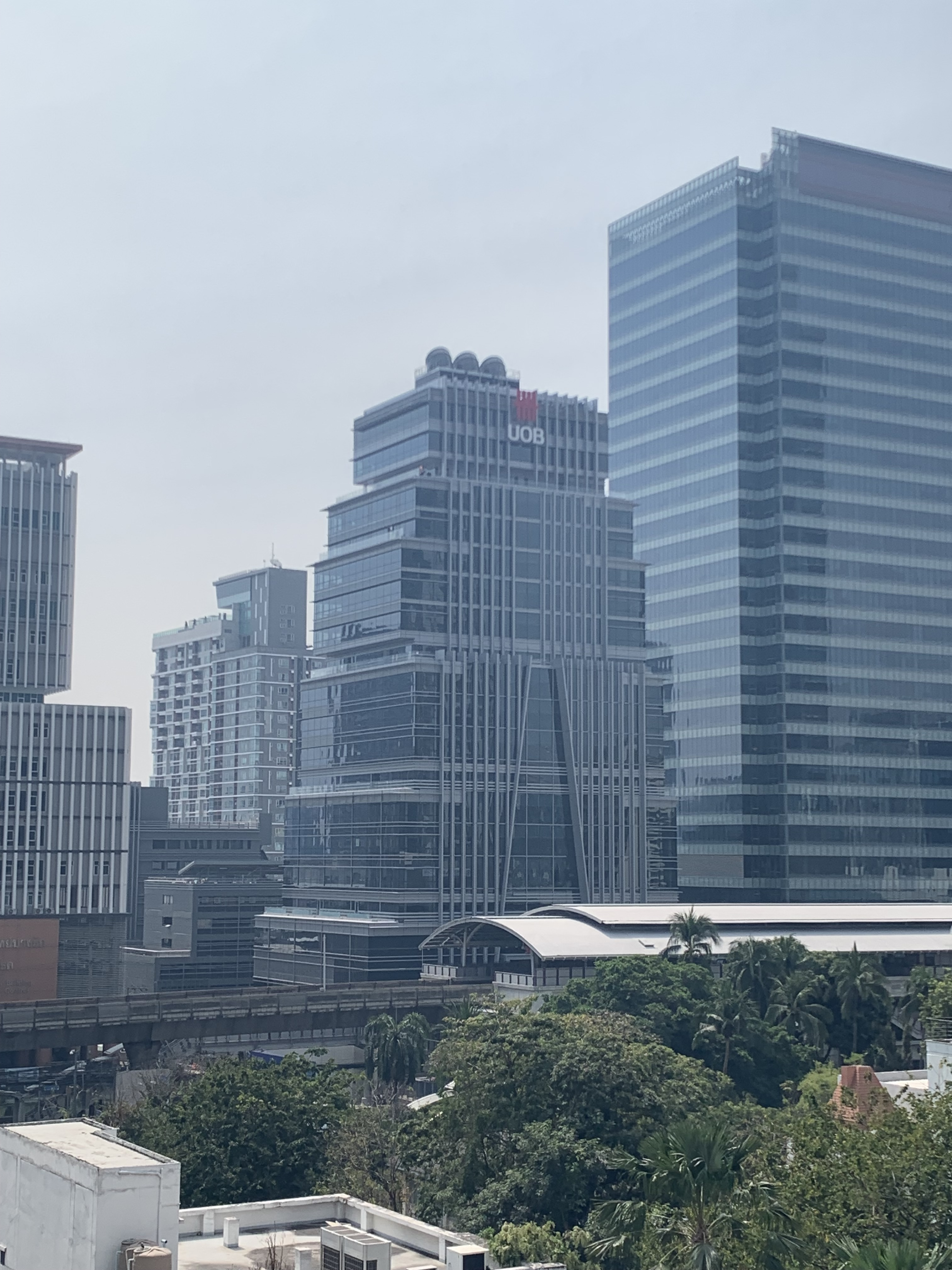
- Robot Building as of 2025, after a controversial renovation
- Interactive map of the Robot Building area

General information
- Status: Completed
- Type: Office
- Location: 191 South Sathorn Road; Bangkok, Thailand 10120
- Coordinates: 13.720448°N 100.527311°E
- Completed: 1986
- Cost: US$10 million

Technical details
- Floor count: 20
- Floor area: 23,506 m^{2} (253,020 sq ft)

Design and construction
- Architect: Sumet Jumsai

Other information
- Public transit access: BTS Saint Louis Station

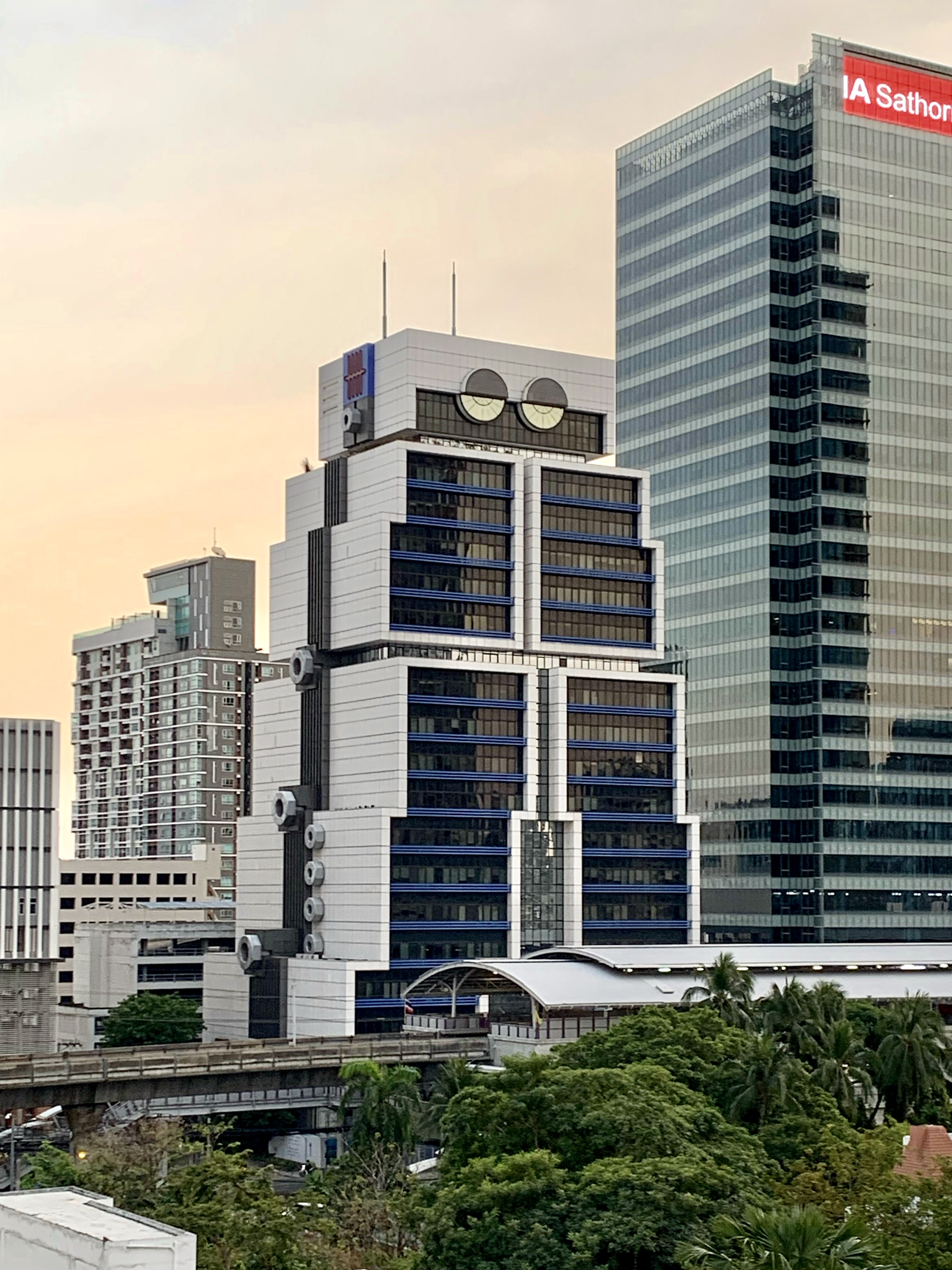
The original facade of Robot Building, photographed in 2022

The Robot Building (Thai: ตึกหุ่นยนต์, Thai pronunciation: [tɯk̚˨˩.hun˨˩.jon˧], RTGS: tuek hun yon), located in the Sathorn business district of Bangkok, Thailand, houses United Overseas Bank's Bangkok headquarters. It was designed for the Bank of Asia by Sumet Jumsai to reflect the computerization of banking; its architecture is a reaction against neoclassical and high-tech postmodern architecture. The building's features, such as progressively receding walls, antennas, and eyes, contribute to its robotic appearance and to its practical function. Completed in 1986, the building is one of the last examples of modern architecture in Bangkok.

== Design ==
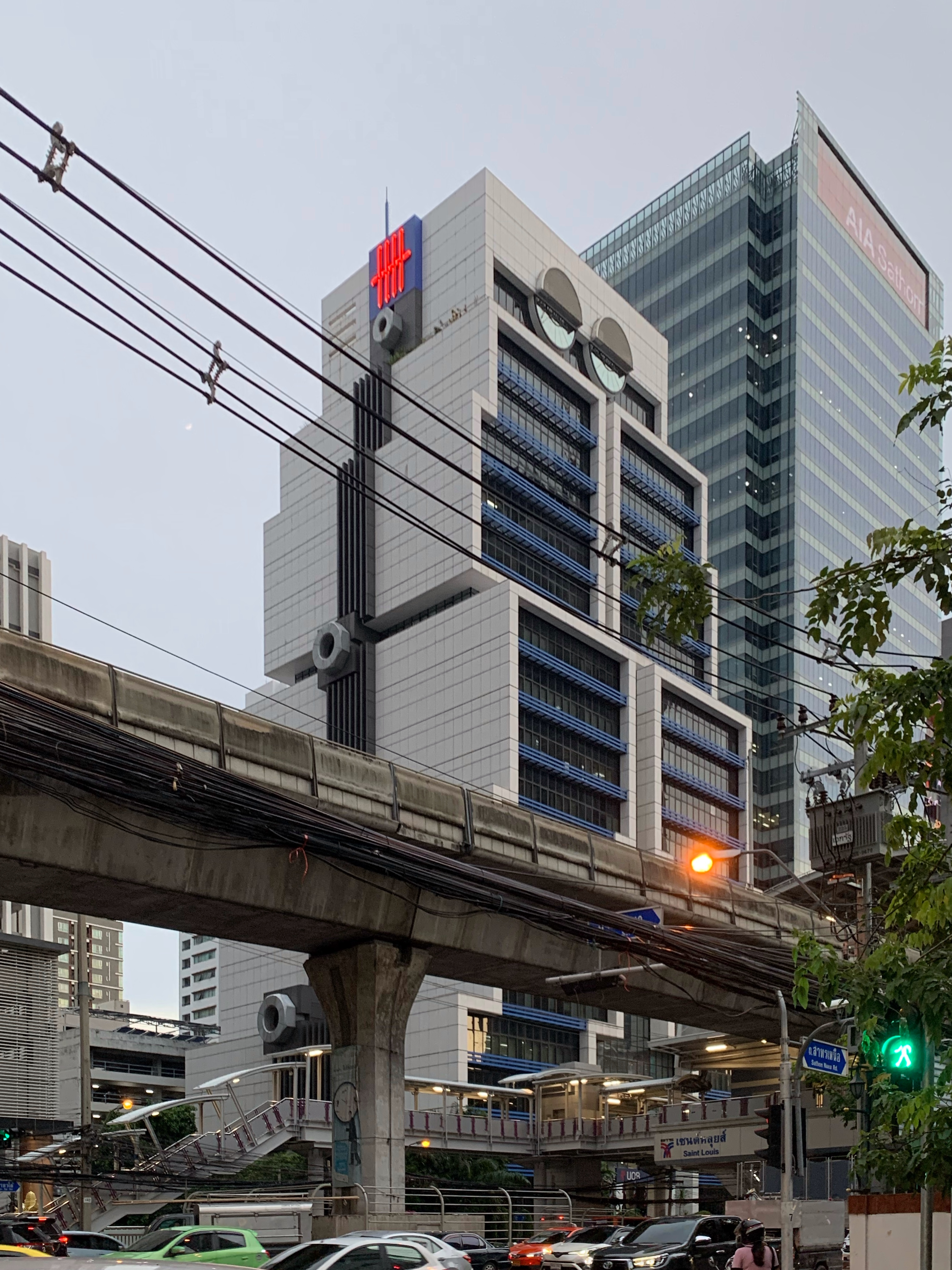
Robot Building and the Saint Louis BTS Station in 2021

Thai architect Sumet Jumsai designed the Robot Building for the Bank of Asia, which was acquired by United Overseas Bank in 2005. He had been asked by the Bank of Asia's directors to design a building that reflected the modernization and computerization of banking and found inspiration in his son's toy robot.

Sumet designed the building in conscious opposition to postmodern styles of the era, particularly classical revivalism and high-tech architecture as embodied in the Centre Pompidou. While Sumet praised the inception of postmodernism as a protest against puritanical, bland modern design, he called it "a protest movement which seeks to replace without offering a replacement". Sumet dismissed mid-1980s classical revivalism as "intellectual[ly] bankrupt[]" and criticized the "catalogue[s] of meaningless architectural motifs" that characterized classical revivalism in Bangkok. He further dismissed high-tech architecture, "which engrosses itself in the machine while at the same time secretly [... loving ...] handmade artifacts and honest manual labor", as a movement without a future.

Sumet wrote that his building "need not be a robot" and that a "host of other metamorphoses" would suffice, so long as they could "free the spirit from the present intellectual impasse and propel it forward into the next century". He wrote that his design might be considered post-high-tech: rather than exhibiting the building's inner workings, he chose to adorn a finished product with the abstractions of mechanical parts. His building, he argued, struck against the 20th century vision of the machine as a "separate entity" often "elevated on a pedestal for worship" and, by becoming "a part of our daily lives, a friend, ourselves", cleared the way for the 21st century amalgam of machine and man.

The building was completed in 1986 at a cost of US$10 million. By the mid-1980s, architectural modernism had faded in Bangkok; this building is one of the last examples of the style.

== Renovation ==
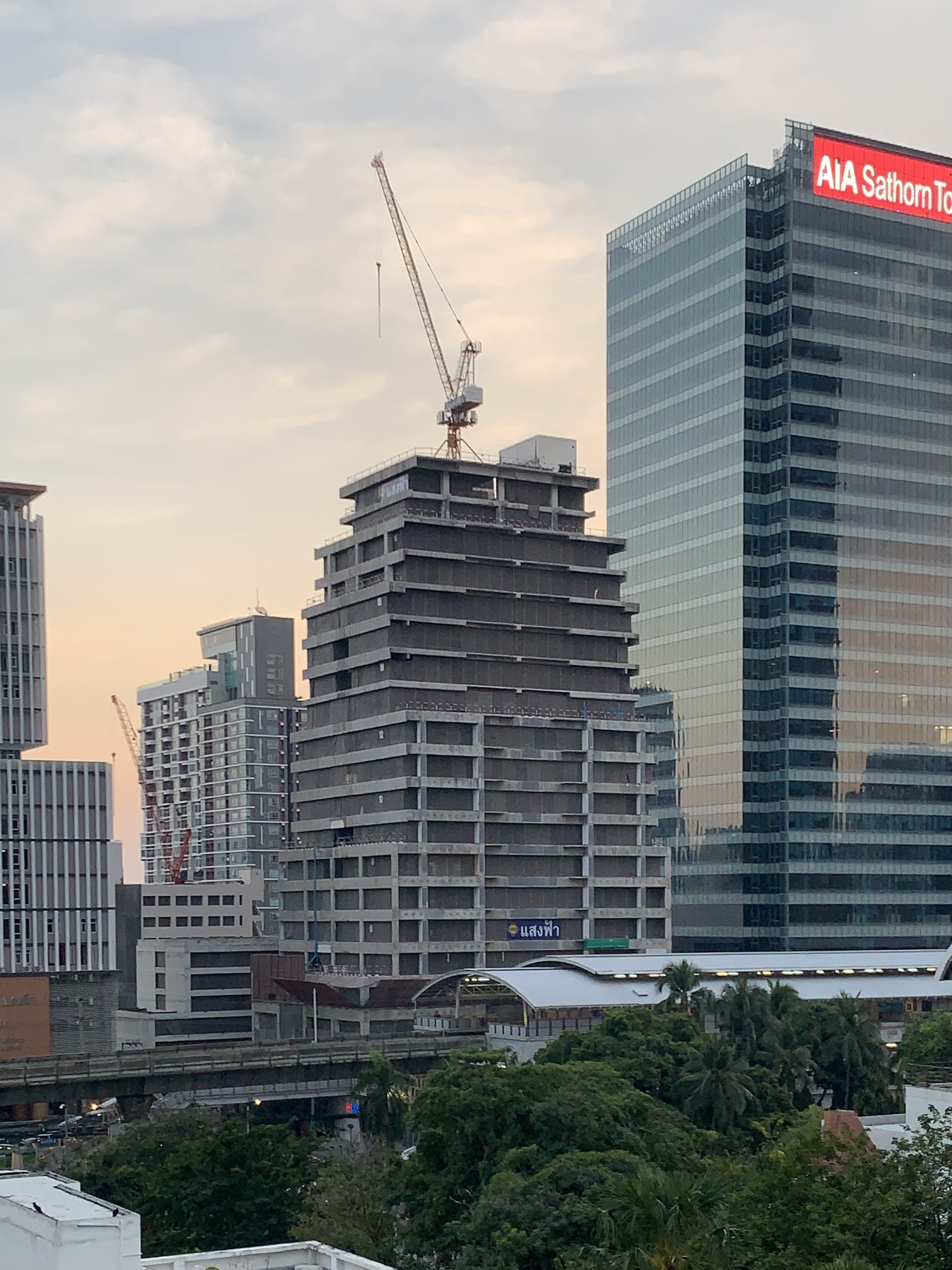
Robot Building Bangkok amid renovations, photographed in December 2023

In early 2023, the building was covered up and a plan to "renovate" the building was realised. It was feared that the renovation may removed the original designs of the building as the planned rendition was never publicly released. A petition was launched on Change.org to have the owner, UOB Thailand, revise the plan and to maintain the original iconic appearances of the building. The architect Chumsai also has contacted UOB Thailand to voice his concerns. Chumsai was concerned with the building's remodelling and stated in an interview with Bangkok Post that the iconic design likely will turn into "yet another office building". In his email to CNN he described the renovation as a "defacement" that demonstrates the "ignorance and arrogance (of) big corporations". UOB's statements over this renovations were to bring it "into a new era while paying homage to its heritage", and have been "carefully planned to balance the need for modernization with respect for the building’s original structure". Construction is expected to be finished by 2025.

== Characteristics ==
The building is 20 stories tall and has a total floor area of 23,506 m² (253,016 ft²). The floor areas decrease progressively at the 4th, 8th, 12th, 16th, and 18th floors; the staggered shape both contributes to the robot's appearance and is an efficient solution to setback regulations requiring an 18 degree incline from each side of the property line. The building's ground floor is a double-height banking hall. The hall's interior architecture, designed in association with the firm 7 Associates, was designed to further the robotic appearance of the building; four sculptures by Thai artist Thaveechai Nitiprabha stand at the main door. Mezzanine floors located on each side of the banking hall contain offices and meeting rooms. The building's second floor features a large multipurpose hall, offices, and training rooms, and its upper floors contain general office space. An eight-story parking garage is located behind the main building.

The decorative exterior contributes its building's robotic appearance, though it often serves practical functions as well. Two antennas on the building's roof are used for communications and as lightning rods. On the building's upper facade, in front of the main meeting and dining rooms of the top executive suites, are two 6 m (20 ft) lidded eyeballs that serve as windows. The eyeballs are made of reflective glass; the lids are made of metallic louvers. Nuts made of glass-reinforced concrete adorn the building's sides; the building's largest nuts measure 3.8 m (12 ft) in diameter and were the largest in the world at the time of their construction. The building's east and west walls (the robot's sides) have few apertures to shield its interior from the sun and to increase energy efficiency, and its north and south sides (the robot's front and back) are tinted curtain walls whose bright blue color was chosen because it was the symbol of the Bank of Asia.

== Recognition ==
The Robot Building was selected by the Museum of Contemporary Art, Los Angeles as one of the 50 seminal buildings of the century. The building also earned Sumet an award from Chicago's Athenaeum Museum of Architecture and Design, the first such award given to a Thai designer. According to Stephen Sennott's Encyclopedia of 20th Century Architecture, the building "enhanced the world's recognition of modern Thai architecture".

== See also ==
- Architecture of Thailand
- Modern architecture
- UOB Plaza in Singapore, which houses UOB's global headquarters
