= Pascale Guédot =

French architect (born 1960)

- Born: 1960 (age 65–66); Pau, France
- Education: École Nationale Supérieure d'Architecture de Paris-Belleville
- Occupation: Architect
- Awards: Prix de l'Équerre d'Argent (2010)
- Practice: Pascale Guédot Architecte
- Buildings: Médiathèque at Oloron-Sainte-Marie

Pascale Guédot (born 1960, Pau in Béarn, France) is a French architect. She was awarded the Prix de l'Équerre d'Argent in 2010.

== Biography ==
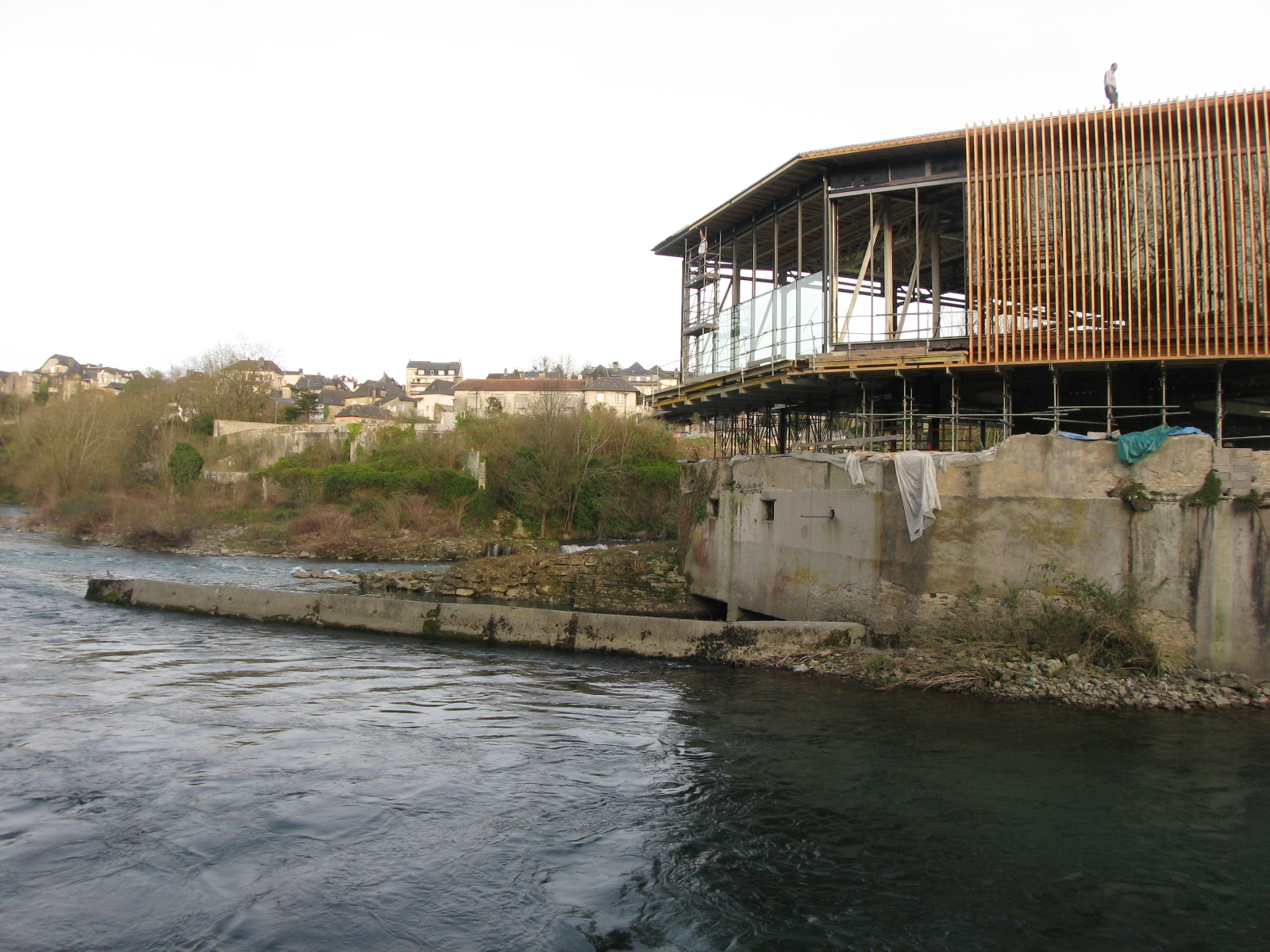
Médiathèque under construction (2009)

Pascale Guédot was born in Pau in 1960. She studied architecture in Toulouse and at the École Nationale Supérieure d'Architecture de Paris-Belleville (ENSAB) under Henri Ciriani, after which she teamed up with Olivier Chaslin to design an extension for the Faculty of Law at Sceaux, a Nursing School at Abbeville and a showroom for Hermès in Pantin. In 1991 she set up her own office in Paris with four or five staff.

In 2010 she was the first woman to receive the Prix de l'Équerre d'Argent, presented to her in Paris for her Médiathèque at Oloron-Sainte-Marie. The building sits on a concrete base concealing a private power station at the confluence of the town's two gaves (mountain rivers). The upper level is covered with a wooden lattice with openings that suggest the local beret and chocolate industries. The jury described it as a "building with elegant sobriety, which blends perfectly into the landscape of Béarn."

Known to be an organised perfectionist, Guédot works in the Mouzaïa district of the 19th arrondissement of Paris and lives in an 8th floor apartment next to the Saint-Martin canal. She has one son.
