= Lee Eunseok =

South Korean architect (born 1962)

- Born: Lee, Eunseok; 31 October 1962; Republic of Korea (South Korea)
- Education: Sorbonne University; École Nationale Supérieure d'Architecture de Paris-Belleville; Hongik University
- Occupation: Architect
- Style: Korean Modernism
- Awards: Architecture Master Prize (2019, 2020), Architizer A+Awards (2020), the Korean Architecture Culture Award (2003), the Korean Institute of Architects Award (2017, 2018, 2023), the Architecture Design Institute of Korea Award (2019), the Church Architecture Culture Award (2010, 2015, 2018)
- Practice: Atelier KOMA, Kyung Hee University
- Buildings: Saemoonan Church, Meditation Chapel, Son Yang Won Memorial Museum, Bujeon Glocal Vision Center, Heavenly Gem Church, Korean American Museum of Art and Cultural Center
- Projects: The Millennium Gate (Seoul Ring)
- Website: komalee.com Lee Eunseok on Instagram

Lee Eunseok (Korean: 이은석; Hanja: 李恩石, IPA: [i ɯn.sʰʌk̚], born in 1962) is a South Korean architect and architectural theorist. He is a professor at Kyung Hee University and a French-registered architect. He was a student of Henri Ciriani, and known as the successor of Le Corbusier.

Lee's design style is classified as New Modernism, a Korean evolution of Modernist architecture. His works focus on public engagement and architectural hospitality. He is known in the architectural community for his monumental architecture and religious buildings.

Lee has designed numerous landmarks, including the Millennium Gate (Seoul Ring), Saemoonan Church, Meditation Chapel, Son Yang Won Memorial Museum, National Museum of Korean Literature, National Gugak Center Performance Practice Hall, Bujeon Glocal Vision Center, Heavenly Gem Church, and Korean-American Art & Cultural Center in Los Angeles.

He has also designed houses, residential complexes, commercial spaces, cafes, hotels, schools, memorials, art galleries, museums, performance venues, corporate offices, research institutes, and convention centers.

== Early life and career ==
Eunseok Lee graduated from the Department of Architecture at Hongik University. He is a French-registered architect (Architecte DPLG), having also graduated from the École Nationale Supérieure d'Architecture de Paris-Belleville. Lee obtained a Doctorate in Art History (Doctorat en histoire de l'art) from Pantheon-Sorbonne University, Paris 1.

In 1995, Lee became the first Korean to win first place in an international architectural design competition, by winning the Korean American Museum of Art and Culture Center in Los Angeles. This competition saw participation from 475 teams with over 1,600 contestants from 68 countries. His victory left a significant impact in the architectural communities of the US, France, and Korea, and marked his first major recognition in both domestic and international architectural circles.

After returning to South Korea, Lee won first place again in the Millennium Gate competition in 1999. This competition saw registrations from 181 teams, including renowned architects and artists like Nam June Paik.

Lee currently serves as the lead architect at Atelier KOMA. He is also a professor in the Department of Architecture at Kyung Hee University. His past roles include President of the Architecture Design Institute of Korea, chief architectural consultant for Sejong City, and examination committee member for the Korean Institute of Registered Architects (KIRA).

Lee has received numerous domestic architecture awards, including the Korean Architecture Culture Award (2003), the Korean Institute of Architects Award (2017, 2018, 2023), the Korean Architectural Design Association Award (2019), the Church Architecture Culture Award (2010, 2015, 2018), and architecture awards from Gangnam-gu, Seoul, Busan, Daegu, and Gyeonggi-do. His works have been internationally recognized, winning awards such as the Architecture Master Prize (2019, 2020) and the Architizer A+Awards (2020).

== Style ==
=== Korean modernism ===
Lee studied architecture under Henri Ciriani, who is recognized as one of the most faithful interpreters of the works of Le Corbusier. Consequently, his designs align closely with the values of modernist architecture, a tendency particularly evident in his early works. He merged its principles with the values of traditional Korean architecture.

While his works adhere to modern architectural design principles, they effectively capture the essence of Korea's natural and urban landscapes. Lee Eunseok's designs incorporate values of traditional Korean architecture, such as chagyeong (차경; 借景), the practice of integrating natural elements into the architecture; geomibullu, hwaibulchi (검이불루 화이불치; 儉而不陋 華而不侈), which emphasizes being modest without being shabby and splendid without being extravagant; and the flexible use of space through features like madang (마당), openness, and yobak (여백; 餘白), the deliberate use of empty space.

=== Religious architecture ===
Lee Eunseok has made significant contributions to the development of contemporary religious architecture. Among Korean architecture students, there is even a joke that "studying church architecture is complete with just Lee Eunseok and Atelier KOMA." Starting with Mokyang Church in Daejeon (1996), his first church design, and culminating in Saemoonan Church in Gwanghwamun (2019), Lee is known to have designed over 100 churches in South Korea. Given that church construction has significantly declined in many other countries, architects who have designed as many churches as Lee are rare even on a global scale.

Lee's prolific work has gradually challenged and reshaped the public perception of Christian architecture, which was once confined to the Gothic stereotype of "churches must be pointed." Each new church he designed has influenced other architects, driving the evolution of modern church architecture. His ability to accomplish such an extensive portfolio can be attributed not only to his skill as an architect but also to his devout Christian faith, which allowed him to deeply understand and reflect the needs of worshippers in his designs.

In his book, New Church Architecture: Do It This Way, written after returning to South Korea, Lee proposed new directions for contemporary church architecture and categorized practical design types that churches could pursue. Later, in Beautiful Church Architecture, he explored the question of "What makes a church beautiful?" through an analysis of various domestic and international examples. This book became a bestseller in the field and is regarded as a textbook for church architecture.

Lee is also credited as the first architect to use the "boxed cross" design. In an interview, he revealed that he was inspired by the bell tower of the La Tourette Monastery, designed by Le Corbusier, during a past visit. Unlike the decorative spires of Gothic cathedrals that aimed to stand out, Lee's boxed cross integrates seamlessly with the church's existing volume and functions, emphasizing practicality. This design has since been widely adopted by other architects and has become a trend in modern church architecture. Variations include windowed boxed crosses, engraved boxed crosses, embossed boxed crosses, "ㄱ"-shaped boxed crosses, "ㄷ"-shaped boxed crosses, and "ㅁ"-shaped boxed crosses.

== Ideas ==
=== Architectural hospitality ===
Architectural hospitality is a concept extensively explored by Eunseok Lee in his book "Hospitality of Architect Eunseok Lee: Seven Thoughts Towards Open Architecture." In this book, the author describes seven architectural languages that can realize publicness and hospitality in building design: 1) Promenade and Escort, 2) Heritage and Consideration, 3) Symbolism and Metaphor, 4) Embracement and Fellowship, 5) Elevation and Openness, 6) Filling and Sharing, and 7) Nature and Meditation.

== Major works ==
=== National Museum of Korean Literature ===
The National Museum of Korean Literature, also known as Munhak Village (문학 마을), is a cultural institution designed to celebrate the depth and breadth of Korean literary heritage. Situated near Mt. Bukhan, the museum's design reflects a harmonious blend of natural and urban elements, aiming to immerse visitors in the rich cultural context of Korean literature.

The architectural concept of Munhak Village begins with a humble, background-oriented approach, embracing the horizontal simplicity characteristic of traditional Korean architecture. This design minimizes the visual weight of the structures, allowing Mt. Bukhan to remain a prominent natural backdrop. The overarching goal is to create a literary village where the architecture serves as a vessel for interaction, performance, and movement, rather than as a mere object of visual admiration. This transforms the museum into a living space where the experience of literature is dynamic and participatory.

The museum complex consists of four main buildings and five gardens, collectively referred to as 사건오간 (四建五間). Thus, architecturally, the complex features four solids and five voids. Each garden represents one of the five classical elements—metal, wood, water, fire (interpreted as air), and earth—symbolizing the seamless integration of nature with the built environment. These open spaces are designed to foster interaction between the museum, the surrounding park, and the adjacent art village, erasing boundaries and encouraging the free flow of people and nature.

The museum's spatial organization is based on the balance between solid and void, a concept rooted in Korean literature and philosophy. The solid structures of the museum are designed to capture and reflect the natural beauty of Mt. Bukhan, while the voids allow for panoramic views of Seoul's urban landscape. This interplay creates a dramatic yet harmonious dialogue between the natural and urban settings.

The design includes flexible boundaries that blend indoor and outdoor spaces, creating a continuum of experiences. The museum houses various functional areas, including classrooms, a library, galleries, and storage facilities. These are connected by a circulation path that integrates the different sections into a cohesive whole. This approach supports a wide range of activities, from exhibitions and educational programs to interactive experiences.

In response to the evolving needs of the post-pandemic era, the museum's layout offers spatial flexibility. The underground level serves as a universal plan, while the above-ground structures are divided into four independent masses. This separation ensures the independent operation of spaces, including dedicated entrances for community facilities like cafes and multipurpose rooms, which can function autonomously.

The museum's design reflects its cultural and historical context, particularly its location in Eunpyeong-gu, a district known for its literary significance. The concept of "borrowed scenery" (차경; 借景) is deeply ingrained in Korean architectural tradition and is prominently featured in the design. The structures borrow the natural beauty of the surrounding landscape, creating a serene and immersive environment for visitors.

The National Museum of Korean Literature embodies the principles of a "rakevium"—a hybrid of archive, library, and museum—by offering spaces that not only store and display literary artifacts but also encourage active engagement and reinterpretation of literature.

=== Meditation Chapel ===
The Meditation Chapel, known as the "멍때림 채플," is conceived not as a traditional urban worship site but as a minimalist sanctuary for existential reflection amidst nature. Open to all, this public chapel serves as a meditative retreat for pilgrims seeking solace and introspection, embodying the essence of an existential pilgrimage space.

The architectural concept of the chapel is embodied in its simple, lifted concrete volume, symbolizing separation from the secular world. Elevated above the ground, this minimalistic design fosters a serene atmosphere through its minimalist spatial sequence. This architectural languages diverges from the Japanese style, which emphasizes firmly grounded structures (due to earthquake risks) and complex spatial sequences to create authoritative spaces. The chapel invites visitors to pause and reflect beneath an open sky, offering a space free from distractions and complexity.

The chapel's interior (Sea Chapel) is defined by four distinctive walls, each enhancing a unique sensory dimension of the space. The Wall of Meditation (멍때림의 벽), with its translucent window facing the West Sea, offers a serene view of the blurred seascape, fostering contemplative stillness. The window features a deep recess to minimize distractions from the scenery above and below, focusing attention on the intended view. The Wall of Sound (소리의 벽) incorporates a pipe organ, designed and built by Hong Seong-hoon, the only Korean Organ Builder Meister. The layout of the pipes symbolizes Mt. Mani of Gangwha Island and the West Sea, enriching the environment with auditory harmony that complements the tactile and visual experiences. The Wall of Light (빛의 벽), adorned with twelve green square funnel windows, symbolizes the verdant surroundings and establishes a profound connection with nature. The stained glass, designed by stained glass artist Chung Kyungmi, symbolizes "the Ties of Love" in the Hosea, adding a spiritual dimension to the space. Lastly, the Wall of Background (배경의 벽), a neutral concrete screen, reflects light and embodies a minimalist aesthetic, contributing to the overall tranquility and simplicity of the chapel.

The Meditation Chapel consists of three distinct spaces, each designed to offer a unique meditative experience. The Sea Chapel (바다 채플) offers a faint view of the sea when standing and a view of the sky when seated, encouraging quiet contemplation. The Closet Chapel (골방 채플) provides an intimate, secluded environment for solitary reflection on fundamental values. The Sky Chapel (하늘 채플) opens to the sky and is surrounded by greenery, fostering a deep connection with the natural world. The wall of this space rises above average human sight, shielding the ground-level scenery and guiding visitors' gaze toward the sky.

The Meditation Chapel has garnered acclaim for its meticulous architectural design, as recognized by the 2023 Korean Institute of Architects Awards, which praised its architectural promenade and the interplay of light with the natural surroundings. The exposed concrete's sleek finish and formwork patterns transcend economic value, focusing more on the experiential than the functional. Its design exemplifies extreme minimalism, presenting a floating box from the outside while transforming the interior walls into thematic variations that underscore the chapel's role as a space for pilgrimage and existential reflection.

The design philosophy of the chapel draws heavily from the Eastern concept of emptiness (비움; 여백), inviting visitors to engage more deeply with the environment than with the architectural elements themselves. The front horizontal window offers a view of the sky and sea, encouraging prolonged gazing and a meditative state. The concealed pipe organ within the concrete walls resonates harmoniously, enhancing the immersive experience.

The chapel was designed not as a traditional place of worship but as a space intended to be inclusive and open to all visitors. It includes several distinct areas, including the rooftop Sky Chapel, which offers open views of the surroundings, and the smaller, enclosed Closet Chapel, designed for more private reflection. . The building's minimalist, exposed-concrete design is intended to integrate the structure with its natural surroundings.

=== Saemoonan Church ===
Saemoonan Church, the oldest Protestant church in Korea, celebrated its 132nd anniversary with the completion of a new sanctuary in Gwanghwamun, Seoul. The new building is designed to symbolize the figure of a mother, arms outstretched towards the sky, offering a nurturing embrace. This design reflects the church's deep-rooted history as the mother church of Korean Protestantism and its symbolic association with loving God and loving neighbor. The architectural concept emerged in response to contemporary concerns surrounding church design in Korea. In 2010, during a national design competition, the trend was toward functionalism, with large-scale churches emphasizing monumental structures. In contrast, Saemoonan Church's design aimed to convey spiritual themes through architectural form, prioritizing four guiding principles: historical legacy, the symbolism of an open door to heaven, a space that reflects Christ as light, and the meaning of baptism and reconciliation. These principles were expressed through innovative spatial configurations that served as metaphors for loving God and loving neighbor.

Departing from traditional church architecture, Saemoonan Church challenges the use of Gothic spires and ornate decorations by focusing on simplicity and abstraction. A soft curved surface replaces the conventional pointed spires, symbolizing divine love and mercy, rather than asserting the church's authority. The design prioritizes an inclusive, modern approach, with a fan-shaped worship hall that encourages dynamic participation among worshipers. The soft, flowing curves of the design symbolize God's nurturing and maternal qualities, contrasting with traditional sharp spires and towering Gothic imagery. This approach shifts the emphasis from authority and grandeur to openness and connection, creating an inviting atmosphere for both worshipers and the surrounding community.

A key aspect of Saemoonan Church's design is its concept of "Loving Neighbor," reflecting the church's desire to engage with the urban context and serve the broader community. Unlike typical church designs that prioritize inward-facing sanctuaries, Saemoonan Church opens itself to the public through a sunken courtyard and arching gates, offering a welcoming space for city dwellers. The church's openness is further emphasized by its connection to the Sejong Center for the Performing Arts and the continuous flow of space through the lobby, inviting interaction with the wider community.

The building's transparent glass box and curved walls contrast with the rigid forms of surrounding urban buildings, enhancing visual harmony and offering a calm, open space that protects future generations from the bustling city. The top floor of the education building and the cross-tower, which provide panoramic views of Seoul, serve as public spaces open to all citizens. Additionally, the church's exterior uses Saebi stone, a type of granite, to evoke a sense of tranquility and comfort. The use of Saebi stone, one of the cheapest materials, reflects the Korean architectural philosophy of '검이불루 화이불치' (儉而不陋 華而不侈), which values simplicity without being shabby, and elegance without being extravagant, highlighting how the material is thoughtfully integrated into the design. The careful integration into the urban environment—maintaining a distance from the main road and offering an open public courtyard or madang (마당)—demonstrates the church's commitment to community outreach and accessibility. The architect and the church's decision to allocate substantial portions of the site to public spaces is particularly noteworthy, given its prime location in one of Seoul's most expensive areas.

The new building integrates sustainability into its design. The education building features a rooftop garden, providing a bright and sustainable space, while the church's layout ensures it blends harmoniously into the dense urban landscape. The focus on preserving memory while embracing modernity highlights the church's dedication to both honoring its historical roots and creating a meaningful space for contemporary worship and public life.

Saemoonan Church has received several prestigious awards in recognition of its architectural excellence. In 2019, it won first place in the Cultural Architecture category of the Architecture Master Prize (AMP). The church also earned the Jury Award in the Religious Architecture and Memorials category of the 2020 Architizer A+ Awards. Furthermore, Saemoonan Church was named a finalist for ArchDaily's 2020 Building of the Year Award, further solidifying its reputation as a significant architectural achievement.

== Books ==
- "Hospitality of Architect Eunseok Lee: Seven Thoughts Towards Open Architecture," Pixel House, 2023
- "The World's Best Buildings," Phaidon, 2021
- "Lifted Architecture, Open Value," Space Saga, 2019
- "OPEN BGVC," Pixel House, 2018
- "Point-Counterpoint, Trajectories of Ten Korean Architects, Paris," The Architectural Publisher, 2015
- "Here, Connected: Korea-France Architecture Exhibition," Anyang Foundation for Culture & Arts (Kim Jung-up Museum), 2015
- "Ecole de Paris," Pixel House, 2013
- "5 Architects with Church Architecture," Space Time, 2010
- "Beautiful Church Architecture," Duranno Publisher, 2008 – Awarded the Korean Christian Publishing Culture Award
- "Lee Eunseok, Modern Church & Cultural Architecture," 2007
- "Lee Eunseok, From Art to Architecture," 2007
- "Architects of the World 37 (Lee Eunseok)," Architecture World, 2006
- "Incomplete Modernity," Kyung Hee University, 2005
- "New Church Architecture, Do It This Way," Duranno, 2001

== Awards ==
- 2023 Korean Institute of Architects, Best 7 – Meditation Chapel
- 2022 International Architectural Design Competition, 1st place – Gyeongsangbuk-do Agricultural Research & Extension Services (Beyond Horizon)
- 2021 International Architectural Design Competition, 1st place – National Museum of Korean Literature (Munhak Village)
- 2020 Architizer A+Awards, Winner in Religious Architecture and Memorials Category – Saemoonan Church
- 2020 Architecture Master Prize, 1st place in Cultural Architecture Category – Son Yang-Won Memorial Museum
- 2020 ArchDaily, Finalist for Building of the Year – Saemoonan Church
- 2020 International Architectural Design Competition, Finalist – Korean Pavilion at Dubai Expo
- 2019 Architecture Master Prize, 1st place in Cultural Architecture Category – Saemoonan Church
- 2019 Architecture Design Institute of Korea, Grand Prize – Bujeon Glocal Vision Center
- 2018 Korean Institute of Architects, Best 7 – Son Yang-Won Memorial Museum
- 2018 Church Architecture Culture Award – Dunsan Sungkwang Church
- 2017 Korean Cultural Space Award – Son Yang-Won Memorial Museum
- 2017 Architectural Design Competition, 1st place – National Gugak Center Performance Practice Hall
- 2017 Busan Architectural Award, Gold Prize – Bujeon Glocal Vision Center
- 2017 Korean Institute of Architects, Best 7 – Heavenly Gem Church
- 2017 Architectural Design Competition, 1st place – Gaepodong Church
- 2015 Church Architecture Culture Award – Busan Osan Church
- 2015 Architectural Design Competition, 1st place – New Stay Wirye New Town Terraced Houses
- 2014 Architectural Design Competition, Finalist – Seosomun History Park
- 2014 Architectural Design Competition, 1st place – LH Sejong Headquarters Single-Family Housing Complex (Troa Hills)
- 2013 Seoul Metropolitan City Architecture Award, Excellence Award – Chongshin University Sadang Campus Wing Building
- 2013 Architectural Design Competition, 1st place – Son Yang-Won Memorial Museum
- 2012 Architectural Design Competition, 1st place – Chongshin University Sadang Campus Wing Building
- 2011 Gyeonggi-do Architecture Culture Award, Silver Prize – Neulsaem Church
- 2011 Architectural Design Competition, 1st place – Bujeon Glocal Vision Center
- 2010 Church Architecture Culture Award, Grand Prize – Beomeo Church
- 2010 Church Architecture Culture Award, Silver Prize – Neulsaem Church
- 2010 Gyeonggi-do Architecture Culture Award, Bronze Prize – Leean House
- 2010 Architectural Design Competition, 1st place – Saemoonan Church
- 2009 Daegu City Architecture Award, Silver Prize – Beomeo Church
- 2006 Gangnam District Beautiful Building Award – Cheongdam Woojeonga
- 2003 Korean Architecture Culture Award, Excellence Award – Gyeongsan Church
- 2003 Gyeonggi-do Architecture Culture Award, Gold Prize – World Vision Church
- 2000 International Architectural Design Competition, 1st place – The Millennium Gate (Seoul Ring)
- 1995 International Architectural Design Competition, 1st place – Korean American Museum of Art and Cultural Center in LA
