= The Millennium Gate =

Unbuilt structure in Seoul, South Korea

- 천년의 문 (Korean)
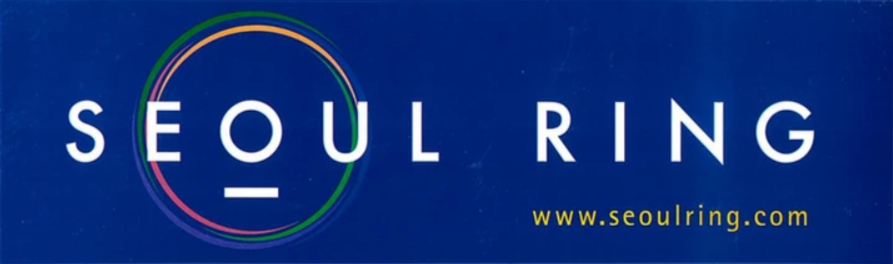
- Alternative names: Seoul Ring

General information
- Status: Never built
- Type: Ferris wheel Observation tower Concert hall Gallary
- Coordinates: 37°33′43″N 126°53′27″E

Height
- Architectural: 200 m (656 ft)

Technical details
- Lifts/elevators: 4

Design and construction
- Architects: Lee Eunseok; O'pus Architects
- Structural engineer: Arup Group

Website
- seoulring.com

The Millennium Gate (Korean: 천년의 문)' was envisioned in 2000 as the world's first mega-sized ring-shaped architectural structure. It was planned to be erected along the Han River in Sangam-dong, Seoul, in conjunction with the new millennium (Millennium), and the 2002 Korea-Japan FIFA World Cup (2002 FIFA World Cup).

== International design competition ==
Lee O-young, the chairman of the New Millennium Preparation Committee, planned, and Shin Hyun-woong, the Deputy Minister of Culture, Sports and Tourism and chairman of the Woongjin Foundation, led the international competition for the design of the Millennium Gate. This was a national symbol project during the Kim Dae-jung government era. In October 1999, a total of 181 teams, including various renowned architects and artists like Nam June Paik, registered, and 36 design proposals were ultimately submitted. In February 2000, a panel of nine judges, comprising the highest authorities in South Korea in the fields of design, structure, landscaping, urban planning, and design (Jang Seok-woong (Chairman), Kang Seok-won, Ko Joo-seok, Kim Jin-kyun, Oh Hwi-young, Yu Wan, Lee Woo-jin, Ji Soon, Han Do-ryong), unanimously selected a joint proposal by Lee Eunseok, a professor in the Department of Architecture at Kyung Hee University, and O'pus Architects (Woo Dae-sung, Kim Kwang-woo, Lee Gye-soon, Jo Sung-ki, Kim Hyung-jong). This work was recognized for its potential and excellence as a landmark of Seoul. Furthermore, Jang Seok-woong, the chairman of the jury, stated, '(The selected work) well represents the symbolism, historicity, and identity of the Millennium Gate.

The winning design for the Millennium Gate was a circular ring symbolizing an open gate. It was to feature the world's first Ferris wheel with a diameter of 200 meters, along with an observation deck, concert hall, and gallery, all integrated into one architectural structure. This building was planned to be completed on a site of about 100,000 pyeong (approximately 330,000 square meters) in the 'Peace Park' on Nanjido, Sangam-dong, in time for the 2002 Korea-Japan FIFA World Cup. It was intended to be utilized as a global tourist attraction alongside the main World Cup stadium.

=== Composition of the Jury ===
- Jang Seok-woong(chairman) from Hanyang University College of Engineering, who has received the Presidential Award and is associated with the Kim Joong-up Architecture Research Institute. He has served as the President of the Korean Institute of Architects and is an Emeritus Honorary Member of the American Institute of Architects. He is also a Director of the Kim Swoo Geun Culture Foundation.
- Kang Seok-won from Hongik University's Department of Architecture and Art has received the Presidential Award, French National Order of Merit (Commander), and the Order of Cultural Merit of the Republic of Korea (Okkwan Medal). He is a Gold Medalist of the Korean Institute of Architects, a French National Certified Architect, and an Architect in Canberra, Australia. He has served as an Honorary Member of the World Congress of Architects in Seoul, President of the Korea-France Cultural Association, President of the Korean Institute of Architects, and as a Professor at both Hongik University and Korea University.
- Ko Joo-seok, an Emeritus Professor of Landscape Architecture at Wageningen University, Netherlands, has also served as a Full Professor of Architecture at Texas Tech University, US, and a Professor at Ewha Womans University. He has received the President's Award of the International Association of Landscape Architecture, the Korean Landscape Design Award, and the Bradford Williams Award.
- Kim Jin-gyun from Seoul National University and MIT has served as President of the Architectural Institute of Korea, the Korean Educational Facilities Society, and the Federation of Institutes of Korean Architecture (FIKA). He has received the Korean Educational Facilities Society Merit Award, the Architectural Institute of Korea Merit Award, and the Prime Minister's Commendation Organization Merit Award.
- Oh Hwi-young from Hanyang University's Department of Architectural Engineering, with a background in Business Administration from Illinois State University, US, has served as a Professor and Honorary Professor at Hanyang University Graduate School of Urban Studies. He has been a Landscape Officer for the City of Chicago, the Blue House, and a Founder of the Department of Landscape Architecture at Yeungnam University and the Graduate School of Environment at Seoul National University. He is a Founder of the Korean Institute of Landscape Architecture and the Korean Environmental Planning and Design Association and has been an Organizing Committee Member of the International Federation of Landscape Architects (IFLA).
- Yoo Wan, an Honorary Professor in the Department of Urban Engineering at Yonsei University, has served as the President of the Urban Planning Society.
- Lee Woo-jin from Korea University's Department of Civil Engineering and Geotechnical Engineering, with a background from Purdue University, US, has worked at the Technical Research Institute of Samsung Construction and served as a Professor in the Department of Civil Engineering at Gongju National University and the School of Civil, Environmental and Architectural Engineering at Korea University.
- Ji Soon from Seoul National University's Department of Architectural Engineering is the first female architect in South Korea. She founded the Ilyang Architects Office and has served as a Professor in the College of Home Economics at Yonsei University, a Director of the Korean Institute of Architects, an Honorary Director of the Korean Association of Women Architects, and has received the Korean Architecture Culture Award Grand Prize and the Cho Pyeong Architecture Award.
- Han Do-ryong from Seoul National University's Department of Applied Arts and as Dean of the College of Fine Arts and Graduate School of Industrial Arts at Hongik University. He is an Honorary Professor at the College of Fine Arts, Hongik University, and a first Cultural Diplomacy Advisory Committee Member. He has received four consecutive special selections at the National Art Exhibition of Korea, worked on the design and supervision of the Korean Pavilion at the Montreal Expo, Canada, with Kim Swoo-geun, and participated in the display work for the Seoul Expo. He has served as the President of the Korean Society of Contemporary Design and received the Dongtan Industrial Medal, the Silver Tower Industrial Medal, and has been inducted into the Designers Hall of Fame.

== Winners ==
=== Lee Eunseok ===
Lee Eunseok graduated from the Department of Architecture at Hongik University and is a French registered architect (Architecte DPLG) with a degree from École Nationale Supérieure d'Architecture de Paris-Belleville. He was a student of Henri Ciriani, who is known as the successor of Le Corbusier. He also obtained a Doctorate in Art History from Panthéon-Sorbonne University, Paris 1. Currently, he is a professor in the Department of Architecture at Kyung Hee University and has served as the President of the Architecture Design Institute of Korea, the Chief Architectural Advisor for Sejong City, and a member of the Korean Institute of Registered Architects (KIRA) qualification examination committee. In 1995, he participated in the international design competition for the Korean American Museum of Art and Culture Center in Los Angeles, US Competing against 475 teams from 68 countries, he became the first Korean to win first place in an international architectural design competition, judged by panelists including Richard Meier, Michael Graves, Robert A.M. Stern, and Kim Jong-sung, gaining recognition in the architectural world both domestically and internationally. He is the lead architect at Atelier KOMA and has received numerous awards, including the Korean Institute of Architects Award, the Korean Architectural Design Association Grand Prize, the Church Architecture Culture Award, and architecture awards from Seoul, Gangnam-gu, Busan, Daegu, Gyeonggi-do, as well as the Architecture Master Prize and the Architizer A+ Awards.

=== O'pus Architects ===
Woo Dae-sung, Kim Kwang-woo, Lee Gye-soon, Jo Sung-ki, and Kim Hyung-jong from O'pus Architects Office were also winners. Architect Jo Sung-ki, after completing his studies at Hongik University and its graduate school, worked on projects such as the 'Seoul National University Management Research Building,' 'Seoul Arts College Ansan Campus,' and the 'LG Sangnok Resort Project' at Creation Architecture. He is a featured artist at the Korea Architecture Expo, particularly interested in church architecture and mixed-use projects like residential-commercial complexes. On the other hand, architect Woo Dae-sung, after graduating from Hongik University and its graduate school, served as a naval facilities officer, was active in the Korean Institute of Architects, and the Organizing Committee for the 1999 Architecture Culture Year. He earned his doctorate with a thesis on 'A Study on the Characteristics of Monumental Urban Architecture' and was active in DOCOMOMO Korea, an organization dedicated to the conservation of modern architecture. Meanwhile, architect Kim Hyung-jong, after graduating from Dongguk University and gaining practical experience at Top Architects Research Institute, worked on design projects such as 'Gangchon Ski Resort,' 'Yonsei University Sangnam Management Building,' and 'Jeonju Riviera Hotel' at Jang Architecture and Creation Architecture following his graduation from the graduate school of Hongik University.

=== Second place ===
- Professor Lim Chae-jin + Lee Sang Environmental Architecture Office (임채진 교수 + 이상환경건축사사무소)

=== Third place ===
- SPACE Group (공간종합건축사사무소)
- Heerim Architects (희림종합건축사사무소)

== Media attention ==
=== Domestic media ===
The Millennium Gate was introduced in the domestic media as a landmark to represent Seoul, akin to the Eiffel Tower in Paris and the Statue of Liberty in New York.

On February 16, 2000, KBS News reported on the winning design of the international competition for the Millennium Gate, set to be built in the Peace Park in Sangam-dong.

On December 4, 2000, MBC News showed computer-simulated images of the 'Millennium Gate,' or 'Seoul's Ring,' planned to be built near the main Olympic Stadium in Sangam-dong along the Han River. The structure, to be made of steel, was said to boast a unique 360-degree circular shape with a diameter of 200 meters, unparalleled in the world. This circular structure symbolizes the desires of our people for creation and emptiness, circulation and completion, and unification. Inside 'Seoul's Ring,' which is expected to be finished with glass, plans included four gondolas and 2000 steps. From the top, one could enjoy views of Seoul, the beautiful sunset over the West Sea, and on clear days, even see as far as Gaeseong. Reporter Lee Seon-jae introduced the Millennium Gate, saying, 'Foreigners entering from Gimpo or Incheon International Airport will encounter Korea for the first time with the mysterious image of Seoul's Ring, along with the elegant arch of Banghwa Bridge visible behind me, and they will remember Seoul with the image of a circle when they leave.'

On December 5, 2000, KBS News reported that a model of the Millennium Gate was unveiled, stating that construction of the Millennium Gate, scheduled to begin in March 2000, would be located on a site of 12,000 pyeong (approximately 39,660 square meters). It was described as having a circular structure with a diameter of 200 meters and a thickness of 18 meters. The space was planned to include not only an observation deck but also various facilities such as a contemporary history museum and a cyber history hall.

=== International media ===
The Millennium Gate received international attention in the architectural community and was praised by world-renowned architectural journals. In October 2000, it was featured in France's d'A magazine, and in 2001, Japan's a+u Magazine covered the Millennium Gate. Particularly, this building drew significant attention for its introduction of the 'Super Scale' concept. It was recognized for its grandeur as a monument representing the half-millennium history of Korea and was constructed in conjunction with the international sporting event of the World Cup. It was evaluated for its scale and significance, surpassing major city structures around the world, as a central facility in the Peace Park, reaching over two billion viewers and visitors worldwide. Additionally, it was anticipated to become an important landmark in the megapolis of Seoul, expected to have a tremendous impact. The building was regarded as having the scale to transcend the extensive surrounding environment, including the Han River, the main World Cup stadium, Nanjido, Seongsan Bridge, and numerous apartment complexes.

== Structural design ==
The large, thin ring structure was unique in the world but presented high construction difficulty due to its complexity. For this reason, Deputy Minister Shin Hyun-woong required the selected designers to work with a world-renowned structural design and wind tunnel testing company. Additionally, in a meeting of related ministry heads, it was decided to increase the budget for the construction of the Millennium Gate from 30 billion won to 55 billion won. The design initially failed three times in wind tunnel tests conducted by RWDI in Canada, but a solution was found with the UK structural design firm Arup Group, known for resolving structural issues of the Sydney Opera House. After ten months of effort, a structural design capable of withstanding earthquakes, winds, and floods that occur once every hundred years was completed.

== Project cancellation ==
On March 28, 2001, newly appointed Minister of Culture and Tourism, Kim Han-gil, announced the decision not to proceed further with the Millennium Gate construction project. He explained this decision was made 'considering the possibility of securing funds, the current economic situation, the construction period, and public opinion.' Minister Kim explained the project's cancellation was due to the total budget increasing significantly from the original 30 billion won to 55 billion won, but aside from the already secured government funds (8.5 billion won), private funding was uncertain. Additionally, safety concerns arising from wind tunnel test results and design modifications altered the original form of the Millennium Gate.

Professor Lee Eunseok learned about the project's cancellation through a newspaper while wrapping up his work, as announced in the Chosun Ilbo on April 5, 2001. He stated, 'I never imagined the project would be halted as the issues of stability and form alteration were already resolved,' and 'I officially received the notice of suspension only five days after the decision was announced.' He added, 'The Millennium Gate was a project that allowed participation from the entire architectural community and was selected through a fair process involving authoritative judges. It's utterly incomprehensible to suddenly halt a national project that has been underway for over a year.'

At that time, the government abruptly canceled the project and did not pay the 900 million won of design fees, which was 80% completed, to the five domestic and international companies involved. Additionally, the foundation leading the project was disbanded, and 4.8 billion won of grants were forcibly reclaimed. In 2007, the Supreme Court ruled that the 'Millennium Gate Foundation' must pay the architects 880 million won in service fees and more than 1 billion won in interest. However, the foundation argued it couldn't pay as the Ministry of Culture, Sports and Tourism had reclaimed the remaining government subsidy, rendering it financially incapable. The Ministry maintained that the parties involved in the lawsuit should resolve the issue. Later, it stated that it couldn't pay due to the completion of the statutory limitation (5 years) under the National Finance Act. In response, Woo Dae-sung, representative of O'pus Architects, filed a lawsuit against the Minister of Culture, Sports and Tourism for the payment of the implementation design fee, continuing to pursue the case. Heerim Architects & Planners was the company that reviewed all materials of the Millennium Gate during its lawsuit. Nine years after the project's cancellation, in November 2010, they received the design compensation fee following a Supreme Court ruling in their favor.

Subsequently, centered around Shin Hyun-woong, chairman of the Woongjin Foundation, Professor Lee Eunseok, representative Woo Dae-sung, and several cultural figures formed 'Cheonsamo,' a group supporting the construction of the Millennium Gate. Cheonsamo, based on Seoul Ring, the English nickname for the Millennium Gate, created the seoulring.com website and produced commemorative postcards and two types of Seoul Ring promotional stickers, continuing to promote the Millennium Gate project to this day.

== Plagiarism dispute ==
On March 8, 2023, Seoul Metropolitan Government held a press briefing to announce the 'Seoul Ring Zero Implementation Plan,' intending to construct 'Seoul Ring Zero' in Haneul Park, Sangam-dong, Mapo-gu, with construction starting in 2025. In response, the Korea Architects Institute criticized that Seoul Ring and the Millennium Gate are similar in concept, form, name, and even the location of construction, yet there was no mention of the Millennium Gate's design, labeling this as 'an unethical act ignoring copyright' and accusing it of plagiarism. Seoul City, in a clarification statement, stated that Seoul Ring is not a plagiarism of the Millennium Gate's design, as the two share only the circular shape and nothing else, particularly noting differences in the number of gondolas, rotation methods, and functions. Additionally, it was stated that the idea for Seoul Ring was proposed by Mayor Oh Se-hoon.

Professor Lee Eunseok, a co-winner of the Millennium Gate design competition, stated that he had submitted a document to Seoul City in 2022 titled "Five Design Tasks to Realize Seoul Ring," and conveyed that for Seoul Ring to be successful, it should not be a typical Ferris wheel. He also emphasized that Seoul City and Mayor Oh Se-hoon should take the design and copyright issues seriously. He expressed his willingness to share his expertise for the successful completion of Seoul Ring if the copyright issues are resolved, explaining that the ethic and role of an architect is not to undermine projects but to successfully build them.

Criticism towards Seoul City and Mayor Oh Se-hoon intensified in the architectural community. Following the Korea Architects Institute, the Korea Institute of Registered Architects also issued a critical statement, and the prominent architectural portals SPACE and C3KOREA covered the Seoul Ring plagiarism controversy. Young architects, architecture professors, and senior figures in the architecture field continued to criticize Seoul City's design plagiarism.

On May 11, 2023, Mayor Oh Se-hoon, at the 27th National Women Architects Conference, addressed the Seoul Ring plagiarism controversy that has been causing a stir in the architectural community. He explained that he came up with the idea as he didn't want to make an ordinary Ferris wheel and that he only set the basic concept of Seoul Ring after consulting with the Millennium Gate design team. He claimed to have invited the designers of the Millennium Gate to join, but they refused. However, the designers of the Millennium Gate clarified that they never received nor rejected any such request.

On December 3, 2023, Seoul Metropolitan Government announced that the Seoul Twin Eye (tentative name) consortium will proceed with a project to create a complex cultural facility called Seoul Twin Eye in Peace Park within the Sangam World Cup Park. This facility will include a Ferris wheel, concert hall, exhibition hall, fountains, and convenience facilities, based on the proposal submitted to Seoul City. Heerim Architects & Planners, UNStudio, and ARUP Group are announced as the designers of Seoul Twin Eye. Interestingly, ARUP Group was the company responsible for the structural design of the Millennium Gate. Heerim Architects & Planners was the company that ranked third in the Millennium Gate competition and was the architectural firm that reviewed all materials of the Millennium Gate during its design cost lawsuit. Therefore, when Seoul City unveiled 'Seoul Ring Zero,' it was speculated that the unknown domestic architectural firm that drew the perspective drawing could be Heerim Architects & Planners. Even the building layout of the announced Seoul Twin Eye is identical to the layout of the proposal submitted by Heerim Architects & Planners in the Millennium Gate competition. It's worth mentioning that Seoul City is employing unusual project names such as "Seoul Ring Zero" and "Seoul Twin Eye," which might lead to suspicions that they are trying to sidestep possible allegations of plagiarism. Thus, considering the details of the project's progress, it appears that Seoul City and Heerim Architects & Planners are colluding to plagiarize the Millennium Gate for the project's advancement. This situation could potentially create significant controversy within the international architectural community.

Seoul Ring
- 서울링 (Korean)
- Alternative names: The Millennium Gate, Seoul Eye, Seoul Ring Zero, Seoul Twin Eye

General information
- Type: Ferris wheel Observation deck Concert hall Gallary; Zipline
- Coordinates: 37°34′03″N 126°53′08″E
- Cost: $900,000,000 (est.)

Height
- Architectural: 220 m (722 ft)

Technical details
- Lifts/elevators: 64

Design and construction
- Architects: Mayor Oh Se-hoon (idea); Heerim Architects & Planners; UNStudio; Arup Group
- Developer: Seoul Twin Eye Consortium; SK ecoplant co., Ltd.(construction)

Seoul Ring is the English nickname for the Millennium Gate project, which was planned to be built along the Han River (Korea) in Peace Park, Mapo District, Seoul. It is also the abbreviation for the Seoul Ring Zero, a giant Ferris wheel that was planned to be constructed in Sky Park, Mapo District, Seoul. Although the Seoul Metropolitan Government announced the Seoul Ring Zero, now renamed to Seoul Twin Eye, and the project is underway in Peace Park, Mapo District, Mayor Oh Se-hoon announced they would continue to call it "Seoul Ring" due to the difficulty in pronunciation.

== Progress ==
=== 'Seoul Eye' Announcement ===
On August 8, 2022, Oh Se-hoon, the Mayor of Seoul, announced the 'Sunset Han River Project', revealing that one of the projects under consideration is the 'Seoul Eye'. It is a giant Ferris wheel similar to the London Eye in London, England, located along the riverbank. As it is expected to be the largest in the world, it is anticipated to be bigger than the 'Ain Dubai' in Dubai, which stands at a height of 250 meters. Potential locations for the Seoul Eye included Mapo District's Sangam-dong, the Sampyo Readymix concrete plant site in Seongdong District's Ttukseom, and Yeouido in Yeongdeungpo District.

=== 'Seoul Ring Zero' Announcement ===
On March 3, 2023, Mayor Oh announced at the Seoul City Spring Greeting Meeting that the giant Ferris wheel 'Seoul Ring' would be built in Sangam-dong. This was the first time Mayor Oh confirmed the location for Seoul Ring. Nodeulseom Island and Sangam-dong had been considered as potential sites, but after careful consideration, Sangam-dong was chosen.

On March 8, 2023, the Seoul Metropolitan Government held a press briefing on the 'Seoul Ring Zero Implementation Plan'. During this briefing and in a press release, the city announced plans to build 'Seoul Ring Zero' in Sky Park located in Mapo District, Sangam-dong, with construction starting in 2025. Among various location candidates, Sky Park was chosen for its outstanding representation of Seoul's iconic landscape and symbolism. The final decision was made after considering cultural symbolism, scenery, and balanced development in Seoul, narrowing down the choices to Nodeulseom Island and Sky Park. 'Seoul Ring Zero' will feature a unique ring-shaped design without a wheel, and its safety has been assured through consultation with domestic and international design firms and experts. This facility is expected to symbolize humanity and the environment, boosting the city's competitiveness and economic vitality. The mayor added that the project would be pursued through private investment and would include measures to revitalize the Sangam-dong area.

=== The Millennium Gate winning design plagiarism controversy ===
Project name	The Millennium Gate (Feb 2000)	Seoul Ring Zero (Mar 2023)	Seoul Twin Eye (Dec 2023)
Alternative Name	Seoul Ring (English name)	Seoul Ring (Abbreviated name)	Seoul Ring (Tentative name)
Design	Lee Eunseok; O'pus Architects	Mayor Oh Se-hoon, Heerim Architects & Planners	Mayor Oh Se-hoon, Heerim Architects & Planners; UNStudio; Arup Group
Structural Design	Arup Group		
Concept	Super-sized Ring-shaped Landmark near Han River	Super-sized Spokeless Ferris Wheel near Han River	Super-sized Double Spokeless Ferris Wheel near Han River
Shape	A perfect ring in shape	A perfect ring in shape	A perfect double ring in shape
Cite	Peace Park of World Cup Park area	Sky Park of World Cup Park area	Peace Park of World Cup Park area
Function	Ferris wheel, observation deck, concert hall, and gallery	Ferris wheel	Ferris wheel, concert hall, gallery, convenient facilities, and zip-line
Height	200m	180m	180m (ring) + 40m (deck)
Capsules	30 (4) rotating on the inner side	36 rotating on the outer side	64 rotating on both the inner and outer sides
Utilization of Exterior Areas	Laser, hologram show, etc	Virtual Reality and Artificial Reality shows, etc	Fountain, etc

==== Position of the Korea Architects Institute ====
On March 15, 2023, the Korea Architects Institute, a group of architects, pointed out in a press release that Seoul Ring and the Millennium Gate are similar in concept, form, name, and even in their location of construction. However, they noted that the Seoul City announcement made no mention of the Millennium Gate design that was planned in 2000. They labeled this as "an unethical act ignoring copyright" and argued that if the construction proceeded in this manner, it would inevitably be considered plagiarism. Moreover, they expressed deep disappointment and concern that Seoul City, which values design, is pushing forward an important project without a basic understanding of copyright.

==== Seoul City's clarification ====
On March 16, 2023, Seoul City refuted claims that the ongoing 'Seoul Ring' project plagiarized the design of the Millennium Gate planned in 2000. Seoul City stated that the Seoul Ring design was an example to set a direction for deriving a specific design plan, emphasizing that the basic circular shape of the Ferris wheel is a public domain that anyone can use. Seoul City also denied the copyright infringement claims, noting that apart from both being circular, Mayor Oh's Seoul Ring and the Millennium Gate have nothing in common. They explained the difference is that while the Millennium Gate has only four gondolas (closed cabins), Mayor Oh's Seoul Ring has 36 cabins. Mayor Oh's Seoul Ring is described as an amusement facility with 36 cabins rotating, whereas the Millennium Gate is emphasized as a building. Seoul City also pointed out that the gondolas in the Millennium Gate rotate inside, while in Mayor Oh's Seoul Ring, they rotate outside. Seoul City explained that functionally, the Millennium Gate (an observation tower, viewpoint) and Seoul Ring (Ferris wheel) have different structures, thus not constituting copyright infringement. However, Seoul City added that they respect the design of the Millennium Gate and will take appropriate measures if legal issues arise during the private investment project design process.

On March 17, 2023, in an interview with the JoongAng Ilbo, Mayor Oh Se-hoon, who was in London, said he wanted to hear directly from Ferris wheel design companies there and was told that there was no problem with the structure of Seoul Ring. A representative of Starnes, the company that designed the London Eye, told Mayor Oh that the London Eye was built over 20 years ago using heavier materials, but now materials are lighter, and technology has greatly advanced. He mentioned China's 'Eye of Bohai' (145m high) as a ring-shaped Ferris wheel and added that Seoul Ring would be even better. Mayor Oh also stated that he proposed the idea of the ring shape for 'Seoul Ring.'

On May 11, 2023, at the 27th National Women Architects Conference organized by the Korean Women Architects Association, Mayor Oh Se-hoon, a speaker at the event, made his first statement about the Seoul Ring plagiarism issue that has been controversial in the architectural community. He explained that he only set the basic concept of 'Seoul Ring' after consulting with the 'Millennium Gate' design team. Mayor Oh revealed that he started intervening personally when the project was delayed. He didn't want to replicate a common Ferris wheel found worldwide, so he suggested to the dedicated department to create a structure with a smooth central part and rotate the Ferris wheel on top, which could become a global landmark. As a result, the department started consulting the team that designed 'Millennium Gate.' He claimed that he requested the original designer to join their team due to concerns about plagiarism, but the designer refused, feeling offended. He clarified that what Seoul City has come up with is just a concept for creating a smooth Ferris wheel, and the actual project is just starting now, hoping it's not misunderstood. However, the designer of the Millennium Gate clarified that they had never received or rejected any participation request from Seoul City.

==== Professor Lee Eunseok's position ====
On March 17, 2023, Professor Lee Eunseok, a co-winner of the Millennium Gate design competition, expressed in a conversation with the Chosun Ilbo that the revival of the Millennium Gate would be a joyful and moving event. He mentioned that if they are recognized as the original designers, they could provide their expertise to achieve an even greater outcome. Professor Lee revealed that in November 2022, he had submitted 'Five Design Tasks for Implementing Seoul Ring,' including 'maintaining the landmark role with a robust circular form,' to Seoul City. He also conveyed the idea that it must be an 'entirely new concept' to succeed, not just a typical Ferris wheel. He disagreed with the New Architects Institute's stance, arguing that the ethic of an architect is not to undermine projects but to successfully erect them. Additionally, in a conversation with KBS, Professor Lee argued that Seoul City and Mayor Oh Se-hoon need to think more carefully about design and copyright issues. He added that if the copyright issue is resolved, he would like to provide his expertise on the Millennium Gate to Seoul City in any way possible to help.

On March 19, 2023, Professor Eunseok Lee mentioned in a conversation with Maeil Business Newspaper that the Millennium Gate was designed as the world's first architectural structure combining a Ferris wheel and an observation deck and was selected in the conceptual design phase. Initially, the Millennium Gate was planned with 30 gondolas, but due to cost issues, the number was reduced to four. Professor Lee explained that the cost of the gondolas was very high, leading to the construction cost being double the estimate, which resulted in the reduction of the number of gondolas. Additionally, Professor Lee mentioned that while Mayor Oh Se-hoon promotes 'Design Seoul,' he wonders what creative ideas can emerge if copyrights are not protected. He expressed his sole desire to contribute to achieving a national symbol by having their copyright recognized. He noted that while Seoul Ring might seem simple from an administrator's perspective, it is a high-tech architectural project that is difficult to construct without the active participation of the original architect who has experience with both failures and successes, especially after resolving copyright issues.

On December 4, 2023, Professor Eunseok Lee shared a post on his personal SNS regarding Seoul Ring, titled <We Hope for Hospitality, Not the Demise, of Seoul Ring>, summarizing his position along with Kim Hyung-jong and Jo Sung-ki, co-representatives of Opus Architects Office.

We, as co-designers, share Principal Woo Daeseung's concern over Seoul City's insufficient handling of the Seoul Ring's copyright issues. However, it's troubling that his views are being misinterpreted as representing all co-designers.

Professor Lee Eunseok, a co-creator of the Millennium Gate, and co-principals Kim Hyungjong and Jo Sungki of the now-dissolved O'pus Architects, hold a different viewpoint from Co-principal Woo, who recently initiated legal action against Seoul City.

1. Rather than outright opposing the construction of 'Seoul City's Seoul Ring,' we aspire to see the creation of a 'beautiful Seoul Ring' that respects copyrights.

2. The complete circular design, even more than twenty years after its initial selection, continues to possess vast potential as a landmark epitomizing South Korea along the Han River.

3. We advocate for structured dialogue with Seoul City, hoping that collaboration utilizing the original designers' knowledge in design concepts, solutions, techniques, and structures can address the various challenges of the Seoul Ring project.

Each instance of plagiarism allegations tainting the news about Seoul Ring deeply troubles us as co-designers. We believe that through cooperative efforts, Seoul Ring can be splendidly executed. We eagerly anticipate the day when Seoul Ring will be globally recognized and cherished as a South Korean landmark.

Once more, we (Professor Lee Eunseok, Principal Kim Hyungjong, and Principal Jo Sungki) sincerely wish to collaborate towards a beneficial outcome. This is the essence of what the Seoul Ring was originally intended to symbolize. — Lee Eunseok, Kim Hyungjong, and Jo Sungki, We Hope for Hospitality, Not the Demise, of Seoul Ring,

==== Korean architectural community's reaction ====
On March 15, 2023, the Korea Architects Institute released a press statement highlighting that despite the similarities in concept, form, name, and even the location between Seoul Ring and the Millennium Gate, Seoul City's announcement failed to mention the design of the Millennium Gate planned in 2000. They deemed this a clear disregard for copyright, unethical, and stated that proceeding with construction would inevitably lead to accusations of plagiarism. They also expressed deep disappointment and concern over Seoul City proceeding with such a significant project without a basic understanding of copyright, especially when the city emphasizes design.

On March 17, 2023, criticism arose within the architectural community regarding Seoul City's approach. A senior architect commented that Seoul City, as a public institution, should protect the rights of designers. Yet, consulting with international Ferris wheel design firms and large construction companies before making a concrete announcement and suggesting changes if problems arise, showed irresponsibility.

On March 21, 2023, the leading Korean architectural online portal C3KOREA introduced Seoul City's Great Han River Project, explaining that while productive discussions on the project's rationale and feasibility are necessary, almost none have occurred. Instead, the debate has been mired in plagiarism controversies immediately following the design reveal, with little progress made.

On March 22, 2023, Architect Ham In-sun (former professor at Hanyang University) in an interview with The Hankyoreh, pointed out that while the 'Eye of Bohai' in Weifang, China, claimed by Seoul City as a reference, is ring-shaped, it is closer to a donut shape with many supports, differentiating it from Seoul Ring. He criticized Seoul City's presentation of Seoul Ring, noting it replicates the Millennium Gate in every aspect - from form, proportion, to texture - despite reducing the diameter from 200m to 180m, calling it a regrettable act of plagiarism by a public institution that should protect intellectual property. He also questioned the rationale of proceeding with a BTO model that ties design, construction, and operation into a profit-oriented private investment, doubting whether it allows for more rational and creative proposals.

On March 22, 2023, Architect Lim Hyung-nam, in an interview with KBS News, stated that the Millennium Gate was a plan selected through an international competition, designed for the new millennium with a circular structure of 200m diameter featuring gondolas and an observation deck. He mentioned that despite international attention and being an unprecedented attempt, it was aborted due to construction costs and public opinion. He referred to copyright established at the time of the Millennium Gate's announcement 20 years ago.

On March 23, 2023, the Korea Institute of Registered Architects, through the Architect Newspaper, emphasized the importance of architectural designs and buildings created based on these designs, which involve considerable time and effort from architects. They create architectural works after long periods of education and field experience, which embodies the architect's soul. They regard architectural works as part of the architect's life that should be protected as creators. Furthermore, despite copyright being a legal issue closely related to our daily lives, creators' lack of understanding of the copyright system tends to favor the powerful. This is why copyright infringement occurs more frequently in the public sector. Seoul City's announcement of Seoul Ring without mentioning the design of the Millennium Gate was also pointed out as a disrespect to the architectural copyright holder.

On March 30, 2023, Architect Nam Sang-mun (Professor at Ajou University) expressed through his personal SNS that, like all creative works, the copyright of architectural designs belongs to the architects. However, he mentioned that Seoul City's careless handling related to Seoul Ring shows a complete disregard for the concept of architectural copyright in our society. He noted that if public officials exhibit such attitudes, the situation could be even worse among private individuals, where there are numerous instances of clients requesting planning and design work for free or at cost, only to then steal the design and construct it secretly.

On April 4, 2023, Architect Ryu Chun-soo (Lee Gong Architecture), who designed the Seoul World Cup Stadium and the Seoul Ritz-Carlton Hotel, posted an analysis video on Ryu Chun-soo SPACE TV titled <Is the so-called Seoul Ring plagiarism of the 'Millennium Gate'?>. In the video, Architect Ryu pointed out the similarities between Seoul Ring and the Millennium Gate and questioned Seoul City's announcement that Mayor Oh Se-hoon provided the idea directly. Moreover, he noted that Seoul City's emphasis on the difference in the number of gondolas is contradictory since this aspect was changed during the planning stage of the Millennium Gate. He evaluated that if the structure's diameter is close to 200m, the direction of rotation would not cause problems with the view, and considering the points where the gondolas touch the ground, internal rotation would be more appropriate. He argued that the visual materials provided by Seoul City require high technical expertise, yet the absence of any mention of the project's designer or architect is questionable. Architect Ryu also mentioned the names of the Millennium Gate competition jurors (Jang Seok-woong, Ji Soon, Kim Jin-kyun, Kang Seok-won, Ko Joo-seok, etc.), suggesting they made an objective judgment during the evaluation process. He emphasized that this issue is not merely about right or wrong but must be addressed as a copyright issue. He analyzed that the examples mentioned by Seoul City (Eye of Bohai, Ring of Life in China, and Big O in Japan) are conceptually very different from Seoul Ring. However, he viewed Seoul Ring and the Millennium Gate as not significantly different in concept, name, location, and design concept. Despite this, he criticized Seoul City's hasty decision to announce it as a completely different idea 23 years later. He argued that Seoul City's current stance of not recognizing any copyright for the winners who have completed detailed designs is problematic. He stated that the realization of Seoul Ring transcends technical issues and must acknowledge the copyrights of the original designers, such as Professor Eunseok Lee, who designed the Millennium Gate in 2000. He recalled telling Mayor Oh Se-hoon at a Seoul Design event in 2010, "If you want to talk about design, please prioritize talking about designers first," emphasizing that discussions about design cannot proceed without the involvement of designers. Nevertheless, Seoul City announced that it had consulted construction companies instead of mentioning any designers, which he likened to "asking a publishing house for advice on poetry or novels." He concluded by expressing his hope that "Seoul Ring will be completed as a globally beautiful circular structure with the participation of the original designer, Professor Eunseok Lee.

On April 19, 2023, Kim Dae-seok, the editor-in-chief at Sangsang Publishing, raised several concerns in an interview with The Korea Herald regarding the announcement of the Seoul Ring project. Firstly, the project site is remarkably similar to that of the Millennium Gate project. Secondly, copyrights for designs planned and reviewed 20 years ago are not being recognized. Thirdly, there's a lack of understanding of copyright among project stakeholders even after meeting with the copyright holders a few months ago. Lastly, there's uncertainty about who actually drew the presented perspectives. If they were not drawn by an architectural office, it would have been impossible to draw them without sufficient research or understanding of the project, making them merely pictures. However, if they were drawn based on understanding, it could be assumed that the design has already been completed. He found it strange that the design had been proceeding before the project announcement.

On April 27, 2023, Architect Seo Hyun (Professor at Seoul National University) mentioned in an interview with JoongAng Ilbo that several exciting construction projects have been revealed in Seoul, the first being the construction of a Ferris wheel. This idea originated from the London Eye, which became a popular landmark in London, not as an 'eye' but as a 'wheel'. He noted that Seoul has declared joining the "global village's outdated trend" with its Ferris wheel plan. Professor Seo emphasized that while illustrations are essential for promoting construction projects, the images provided by Seoul City were a "knockoff" of the Millennium Gate project's winner located on Nanjido 20 years ago. He argued that due to different structural requirements, replicating the form of the Millennium Gate for a Ferris wheel is challenging, suggesting that ignoring these conditions is evidence of a lack of structural knowledge and copyright consciousness or "senseless" behavior otherwise.

On May 4, 2023, the architectural entertainment channel PHM TV discussed the plagiarism controversy of Seoul Ring in a video titled <Public Institution, Seoul City Openly Plagiarizing Seoul Ring Ferris Wheel! It Wasn't That They Didn't Know About Millennium Gate? What's the Problem According to Architects! [Archism Black]>. Participants included Gong Gyeong-tae (editor at PHM ZINE), Architect Kim Sung-woo (Gongyu Architects), Architect Park Hyun-jin (hjp Architects), and architecture student No Yul-ha. Kim Sung-woo argued that architects fundamentally do not oppose the construction of landmarks like Seoul Ring as part of urban change. However, he regretted Seoul City's attitude of disregarding the designers and the copyrights of the design outcomes of the 'Millennium Gate' project despite being clearly aware of its existence. Park Hyun-jin saw the biggest problem as the architectural, urban, and promotional issues of Seoul City being tied to politics, stating that if this had been purely about architecture and design, it would not have been difficult to discuss. He criticized Seoul City for erasing all traces of the 'Millennium Gate' and presenting Seoul Ring as if it were their new idea, mentioning that Seoul City had communicated with the original designers, Professor Lee Eunseok and Director Woo Dae-sung, which implies Seoul City was aware of the 'Millennium Gate's existence. Thus, he pointed out that Seoul City did not ignore copyright but rather disregarded it. However, Architect Park mentioned that judging architectural plagiarism lacks clear standards like in music, being relative and ambiguous. But, from experts' perspective, the controversy exists as the two designs appear to belong to the same project type based on the images revealed so far. Architect Park highlighted issues with Seoul City's announcement that Mayor Oh Se-hoon personally handled the design and completed the technical review during the bidding process. Architect Kim Sung-woo emphasized the importance of ethical consciousness as architects and the need to use excellent references and reinterpret them during design to avoid copyright issues. Architect Park mentioned that because the standards for architectural plagiarism are subjective and vague, it's difficult for the public to distinguish plagiarism. As a solution, Architect Park argued that Seoul City should engage in dialogue with the original creators, and Architect Kim expressed disappointment with the current progress, suggesting that Seoul City should involve the original creators in the project, obtain their consent to proceed independently, or hold a new competition. Architect Park concluded that if Seoul City intends to maintain the Seoul Ring design, they should consider crediting the original creators and paying royalties to amend the project.

On May 19, 2023, Architect Hong Jae-seung (Adjunct Professor at Yonsei University) stated in Dong-A Ilbo that Seoul City's announced Seoul Ring is too similar to the Millennium Gate, which was not built 20 years ago. Although Seoul City clarified that the final design had not been confirmed, Hong criticized the announcement as being hasty.

In August 2023, Lim Hyung-nam, President of the Korea Architects Institute, expressed concerns in the August issue of SPACE Magazine (No. 669) that "Seoul Ring only slightly altered the lower support structure but is similar to the original Millennium Gate (proposed as Seoul's Ring) in concept, form, name, and construction location. However, Seoul City claimed that circular structures are universally used worldwide and completely ignored the original creators. This is a blatant disregard for architectural copyright, stemming from a low societal understanding of what architects do and the nature of the architectural industry. In Korea, architecture is still seen as a quantity-focused industry rather than a cultural one, dominated by large construction companies during the rapid growth period. There's still a view of architecture as merely a part of the construction process or an appendage to real estate, without questioning why a circular symbol is needed at this location and time. Correcting this perception gap and pointing out mistakes is the association's role," highlighting the architectural community's responsibility. "Millennium Gate was unilaterally canceled when the Minister of Culture, Sports and Tourism (now the Ministry of Culture, Sports and Tourism) was replaced in 2000, aiming to erase the previous minister's achievements, making architects political scapegoats. At that time, representatives of professional groups, architectural elders, or associations should have sternly rebuked the state or administration and demanded rectification, but no one stepped forward. There was a tendency to dismiss it as usual practice or avoid getting on the bad side of authorities. A pervasive defeatism in the architectural field also played a role, leaving the architect to fight a lonely battle. It's an incident that could happen to anyone. All architects must deeply reflect," he added.

On October 23, 2023, Architect Lim Dong-woo (Professor at Hongik University) discussed architectural plagiarism in Lim Dong-woo's Urban Architecture Wanderings. He argued that if a client truly wants something creative, it's more beneficial to entrust the design to creative individuals, as copying other buildings cheapens and degrades their own. In a mature society that values quality over quantity, there should be respect for creative works and fair compensation. He highlighted several landmarks in architectural plagiarism cases, including the construction of Gyeongju Tower, which used stolen designs from architect Itami Jun, and the recent controversy in the architectural community over Seoul Ring, a ring-shaped structure planned by Seoul City along the Han River, accusing it of plagiarizing the Millennium Gate from 20 years ago. Lim noted that idea theft is more common in the architectural field than expected, expressing regret over such practices.

In December 2023, SPACE Magazine, the most prestigious architectural magazine in Korea, discussed Seoul Ring as one of two cases of architectural copyright infringement in its December issue (No. 673). The cases addressed copyright infringement by public institutions and issues with procedural legitimacy ('Will the hasty push for Seoul Ring Zero come to a halt?' refer to page 8) and plagiarism of private architectural works ('The Waveon copyright infringement lawsuit and the aftermath of the demolition order,' refer to pages 116 ~ 121).

==== Korean cultural community's reaction ====
On March 22, 2023, Park Hee-jun, an editorial writer for The World Daily, stated that the late Professor Lee O-young, who died in 2022, is well known for deeply moving the world at the Seoul Olympics using Korea's traditional toy, the spinning top. He revealed that Professor Lee had a bold plan to convey even greater emotion through a structure called 'Seoul's Ring (The Millennium Gate),' over 300 times larger than a spinning top. However, a decade later, a similar structure named 'The Ring of Life' appeared in Fushun, Liaoning Province, China, but it was merely an "art installation" rather than an "architectural structure." Park Hee-jun mentioned recalling 'Seoul's Ring (The Millennium Gate)' immediately upon Seoul City's announcement of 'Seoul Ring.' While the installation of a unique ring-shaped symbol along the Han River is touching, he regretted that it became embroiled in plagiarism controversies. Park raised concerns that the line between a living Ferris wheel and a non-living structure is clear, and that approaching a Ferris wheel while seeking differentiation from 'Seoul's Ring (The Millennium Gate)' might be worrisome. He argued that for 'Seoul Ring' to be a successful sequel to 'Seoul's Ring (The Millennium Gate),' Seoul City must actively utilize the original creator's expertise; otherwise, the project's success would be challenging.

On March 27, 2023, Kim In-soo, an editorial writer for Maeil Business Newspaper, evaluated that if the core element of 'Seoul Ring' announced by Seoul City lies in the circle itself, it's difficult to see it as a new creation. He mentioned that the 'Millennium Gate,' which won the national symbol contest in 2000 over Professor Nam June Paik, received unanimous approval from the jury due to its originality in designing a super-large perfect circular structure for the first time, attributed to the power of the circle. However, he explained that circular structures like China's 'Eye of Bohai' are significantly different from the 'Millennium Gate.' While the 'Eye of Bohai' exposes multiple steel frames to support the circular structure, the 'Millennium Gate' was a perfect circle without unnecessary parts. He commented that we are now in an 'era of idea abundance,' where it's easy to lose the source of ideas and often transform others' ideas as one's own. Kim suggested that if Seoul City made a mistake common among scientists, correcting the source would be the solution. Considering Mayor Oh Se-hoon is a politician and administrator, he said implementing a great work created by an artist would be a significant achievement, asserting that even if the original creator's copyright is recognized, everyone will remember it as 'Oh Se-hoon's Seoul Ring.'

On April 2, 2023, former Deputy Minister of Culture, Sports and Tourism Shin Hyun-woong criticized Seoul City in an interview with Chosun Ilbo for apparently plagiarizing the name, concept, and form of the 'Millennium Gate' without citing the source. He lamented Seoul City's legalistic and culturally insensitive approach, suggesting that changing things upon encountering problems is regrettable. He mentioned that Seoul City initially planned to erect 'Seoul Eye' after London Eye but suddenly announced 'Seoul Ring,' a proprietary name of the 'Millennium Gate,' without the original creator's permission. He refuted Seoul City's claim of developing the 'Seoul Ring' concept by referencing China's 'Eye of Bohai' and Japan's 'Big O,' stating that while the 'Eye of Bohai' is a Ferris wheel rotating within a steel tower, and 'Big O' is a Ferris wheel with a roller coaster passing through its center, 'Seoul Ring' is a perfect circle, leading to plagiarism suspicions due to its similarity to the 'Millennium Gate.' He hoped Seoul City would respect the original creator's honor and fulfill the promise of 'Seoul Ring.'

=== Private Investment Review Committee Approval ===
On September 19, 2023, the Ministry of Economy and Finance announced that the 4th Private Investment Project Review Committee, chaired by Second Vice Minister Kim Wan-seop, was held at the Government Complex Seoul. The committee deliberated and decided on seven items, including the feasibility review proposal for the Seoul Metropolitan Government's giant Ferris wheel private investment project. Seoul plans to construct the giant Ferris wheel, Seoul Ring, in Sky Park, Sangam-dong, with private investment. The construction is set to begin in June 2025 and aims to be completed by December 2027. The project cost is estimated to be around 400 billion won. The committee stated, "We judge the Seoul Metropolitan Government's giant Ferris wheel project to be appropriate as a private investment target facility," and "We expect that the creation of an original design Ferris wheel will become a landmark of Seoul, offering more citizens and tourists opportunities for sightseeing and experiences."

Seoul Housing and Communities Corporation (SH Corporation) under Seoul Metropolitan Government plans to announce a call for proposals for the 'Seoul Metropolitan Giant Ferris Wheel (Seoul Ring) Construction Private Investor' on September 25, 2023. There is strong interest from Starnes, which designed the Ain Dubai Ferris wheel in Dubai – the largest in the world but currently not in operation – and Zuma, a Chinese Ferris wheel company. Due to the lack of related engineering technology in South Korea, it is expected that foreign companies with technical expertise and operational know-how will have an advantage in being selected as project partners. Once the private partner is selected, a public-private consortium will be formed to submit proposals to the Seoul Metropolitan Government. Upon receiving proposals, the city will request an eligibility study from the Korea Development Institute (KDI) Public Investment Management Center (PIMAC). Following the eligibility results, the project will be officially launched through steps such as a third-party proposal announcement, selection of a priority negotiator, and conclusion of an implementation agreement.

=== Announcement of Joint Project Proposer Recruitment and Selection Results for Private Investment Project ===
On September 27, 2023, the Seoul Metropolitan Government announced a call for joint project proposers for the Seoul Metropolitan Giant Ferris Wheel and Complex Cultural Facility Private Investment Project.

On November 29, 2023, the Seoul Metropolitan Government announced the results of the selection of joint project proposers for the Seoul Metropolitan Giant Ferris Wheel and Complex Cultural Facility Private Investment Project. The applicant marked as Symbol I scored 647.25 points in the qualitative evaluation and 137.72 points in the quantitative evaluation, but was deducted 10 points, making a total of 774.97 points. The applicant marked as Symbol II scored 672.75 points in the qualitative evaluation and 135.73 points in the quantitative evaluation, but was deducted 16 points, making a total of 792.48 points. As a result, the applicant marked as Symbol II was selected as the final proposer.

Interestingly, despite previous statements by the Seoul Metropolitan Government suggesting there was significant interest from companies to participate in the Seoul Ring project, it appears that only two applicants were evaluated. Unlike other public architectural competitions where the entire process from recruitment to evaluation is made public, details such as the results of the applicant recruitment, the selection process of evaluation candidates, the composition of the evaluation committee, criteria for score determination, decision-making results, and information about the evaluated companies were not disclosed.

=== 'Seoul Twin Eye' Consortium Submits Proposal ===
On December 3, 2023, the Seoul Metropolitan Government announced that it is moving forward with the project to develop a complex cultural facility named 'Seoul Twin Eye' (tentative name) in Peace Park within Sangam World Cup Park. This is based on the proposal submitted by the Seoul Twin Eye Consortium. The consortium, comprising Seoul Housing and Urban Corporation (SH) and The Ritz along with three other companies, holds the status of the original proposer under the Private Investment Law.

'Seoul Twin Eye' is planned to be built in the plains of Peace Park in Mapo District, Seoul, and will be a complex cultural facility including the world's first intersecting twin wheel Ferris wheel. If built without any design changes, it would be the largest spokeless Ferris wheel in the world and the first of its kind in the form of intersecting twin wheels. It is planned to be built atop a stepped diamond-shaped building, making it the tallest structure of its kind in the world. According to the bird's eye views released by the Seoul Metropolitan Government, the front faces the Mangwon Junction, the northern end of Seongsan Bridge, and Seongsan Junction, while the back overlooks a lake and fountain and the parking lot of the Seoul World Cup Stadium. To the left is Mapo District, and part of Peace Park is on the right. The Ferris wheel capsules, totaling 64, are designed to accommodate 1,440 people per cycle, lifting the wheel up to 40 meters above the ground to maximize the view. The lower part is planned to be utilized as a space for performances, exhibitions, convenience facilities, and leisure activities.

On December 6, 2023, Seoul Mayor Oh Se-hoon explained about Seoul Twin Eye on Oh Se-hoon TV. Mayor Oh announced that due to the difficulty in pronouncing 'Seoul Twin Eye', it will be referred to as 'Seoul Ring' for the time being.

The design team for Seoul Twin Eye includes firms Heerim Architects & Planners, UNStudio, and ARUP Group. Notably, ARUP Group was previously involved in the structural design of the Millennium Gate, while Heerim Architects & Planners had not only ranked third in the Millennium Gate competition but also reviewed all documents related to the Millennium Gate during its design cost litigation. When Seoul City revealed 'Seoul Ring Zero,' it led to speculation that Heerim Architects & Planners, being an undisclosed domestic architectural firm, might have been responsible for the perspective drawing. The layout of the proposed 'Seoul Twin Eye' also strikingly resembles the 3rd place layout submitted by Heerim Architects & Planners for the Millennium Gate competition. It is also noteworthy that Seoul City is using somewhat awkward-sounding project names like Seoul Ring 'Zero' and Seoul 'Twin Eye', which could fuel speculation that they are attempting to avoid potential plagiarism disputes. Given these overlapping details, there is a growing concern that Seoul City and Heerim Architects & Planners might be engaging in a collaborative effort to replicate the Millennium Gate for this new project. This situation has the potential to spark a significant controversy within the international architectural community.
