= 2004 in architecture =

The year 2004 in architecture involved some significant architectural events and new buildings.

== Events ==
- January 28 – Transformation AGO: The Art Gallery of Ontario announces that Frank Gehry has designed a renovation and expansion of the gallery. Supposedly in the shape of an ice skate, the change is met with opposition by frequent benefactor Kenneth Thomson.
- March 24 – Demolition of the Brutalist Tricorn Centre in Portsmouth, England (1966) begins.
- June – Plans for The Cloud, a "Fourth Grace" at Liverpool Pier Head in England by Will Alsop, are abandoned.

== Buildings and structures ==
=== Buildings ===
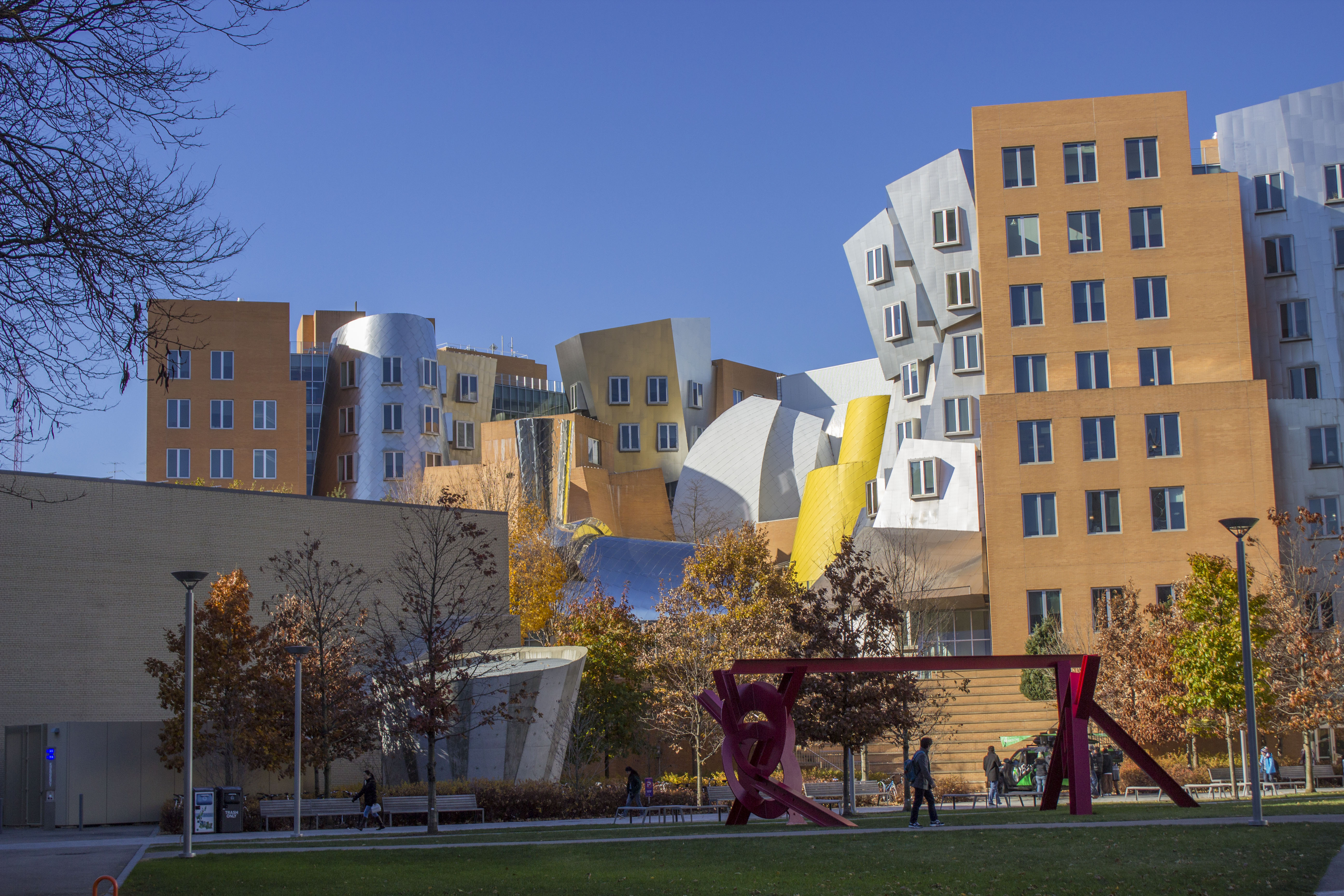
Ray and Maria Stata Center at MIT, Cambridge, Massachusetts, USA

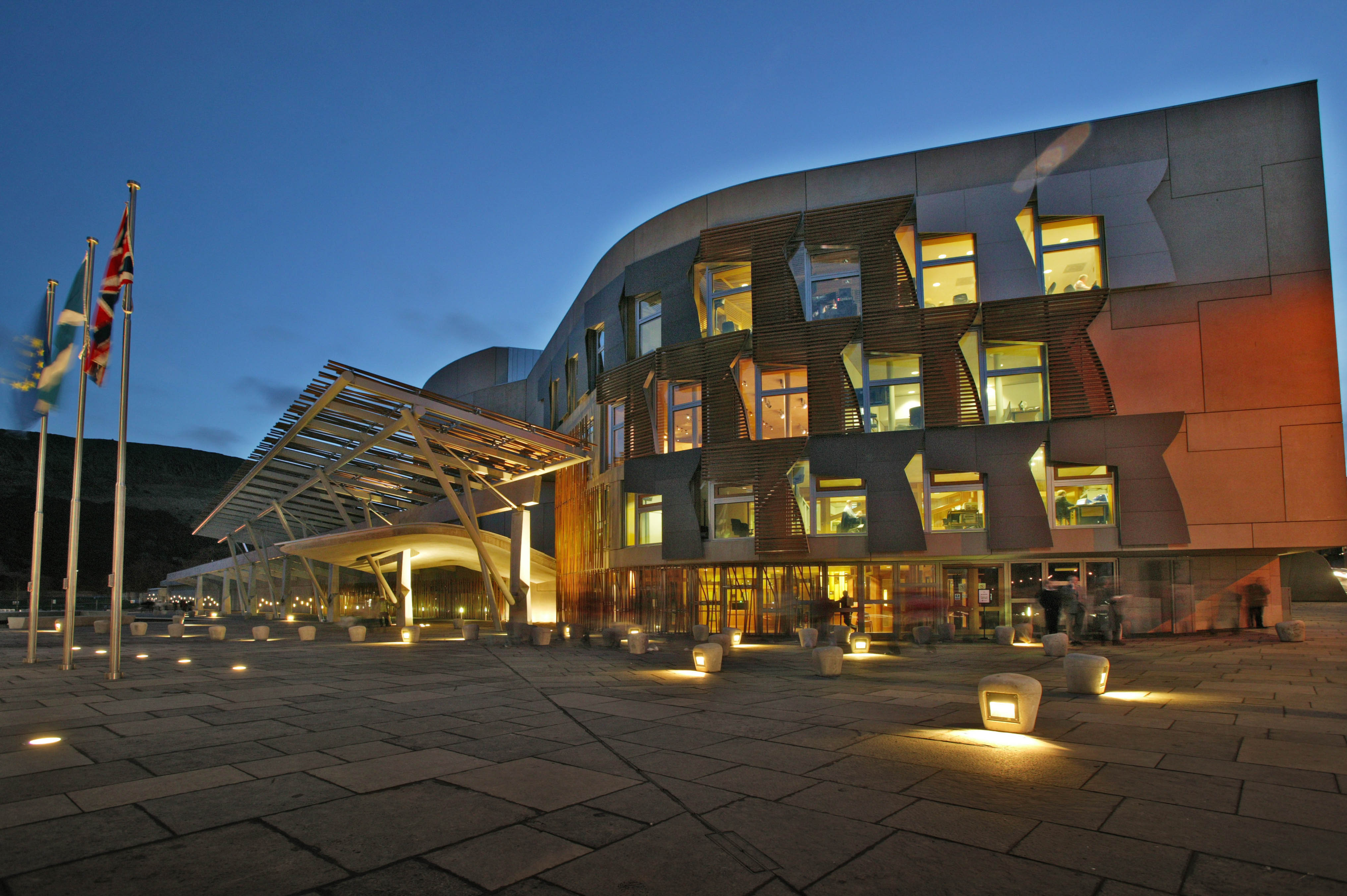
The Scottish Parliament Building in Edinburgh, Scotland

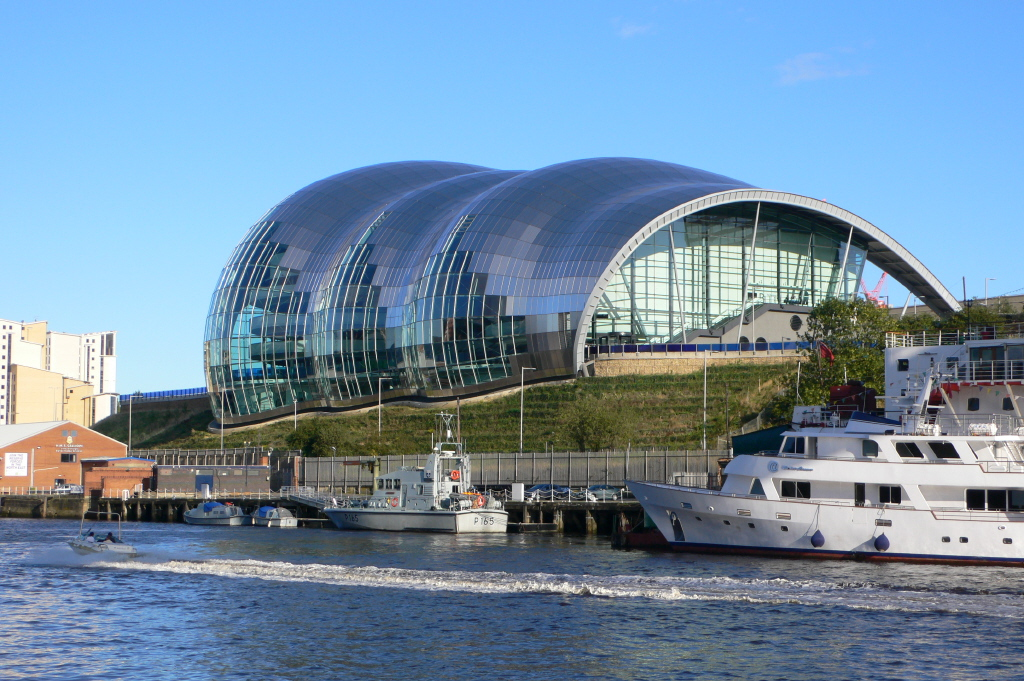
The Sage Gateshead in Gateshead, England

- March 16 – Ray and Maria Stata Center at Massachusetts Institute of Technology, Cambridge, designed by Frank Gehry, is opened.
- April 8 – ARoS Aarhus Kunstmuseum (art museum) in Aarhus, Denmark, designed by Schmidt Hammer Lassen Architects, is opened.
- April 28 – 30 St Mary Axe in the City of London (the Swiss Re building), designed by Norman Foster, is completed.
- May 1 – Europa Tower in Vilnius, Lithuania, the tallest building in the Baltic States (2004–present), is opened.
- May 8 – Forum Building, by Herzog & de Meuron, inaugurated in Barcelona during the opening ceremony of the 2004 Universal Forum of Cultures.
- May 23 – Seattle Central Library, designed by Rem Koolhaas and Joshua Prince-Ramus, is opened to the public.
- July 16 – BP Pedestrian Bridge in Millennium Park in the Chicago Loop, designed by Frank Gehry, is opened.
- September – Sharp Centre for Design, Ontario College of Art & Design, Toronto, designed by Will Alsop of Alsop Architects, is completed.
- October – Jazz at Lincoln Center performance venue in New York City, designed by Rafael Viñoly, is opened.
- October 9 – Scottish Parliament Building in Edinburgh, by Enric Miralles, opened.
- October 14 – Lewis Glucksman Gallery at University College Cork, Ireland, designed by O'Donnell & Tuomey, is opened.
- November 18 – Clinton Presidential Center, Little Rock, Arkansas, by James Polshek, is opened.
- November 20 – Expansion and renovation of New York's Museum of Modern Art designed by Yoshio Taniguchi.
- November 28 – Wales Millennium Centre in Cardiff, Wales, designed by Jonathan Adams of Percy Thomas Partnership, is opened.
- December 14 – Millau Viaduct, by Norman Foster, at Millau, France is opened.
- December 17 – The Sage Gateshead, a concert hall designed by Foster and Partners, opens in North East England.
- December 31 – Taipei 101 is opened in Taiwan, and remains one of the tallest buildings in the world.
- Netherlands Embassy in Berlin opened, designed by Rem Koolhaas.
- IT University of Copenhagen opens its new building in Ørestad, Denmark, designed by Henning Larsen.
- The Chongqing World Trade Center in Chongqing, China is topped out in a ceremony.
- 30 Hudson Street, New Jersey, USA (the Goldman Sachs Tower), Jersey City's tallest building at 238 metres, is completed.
- Reconstruction of Nový Dvůr Monastery, Czech Republic, by John Pawson is completed.
- Reconstruction of Kingswood School, Dulwich, London, by De Rijke Marsh Morgan is completed.

== Awards ==
- AIA Gold Medal – Samuel Mockbee (awarded posthumously)
- Architecture Firm Award – Lake Flato Architects
- Driehaus Prize – Demetri Porphyrios
- Emporis Skyscraper Award – Taipei 101
- Grand prix national de l'architecture – Patrick Berger
- Grand Prix de l'urbanisme – Christian de Portzamparc
- Praemium Imperiale Architecture Award – Oscar Niemeyer
- Pritzker Prize – Zaha Hadid
- Prix de l'Académie d'Architecture de France – Shigeru Ban
- Prix de l'Équerre d'Argent – Antoinette Robain and Claire Guieysse, for the Centre National de la Danse de Pantin
- RIAS Award for Architecture – Elder and Cannon Architects for St. Aloysius' College's Clavius Building, Glasgow
- RAIA Gold Medal – Gregory Burgess
- RIBA Royal Gold Medal – Rem Koolhaas
- Stirling Prize – 30 St Mary Axe, London by Foster and Partners
- Thomas Jefferson Medal in Architecture – Peter Walker
- Vincent Scully Prize – Aga Khan
- Twenty-five Year Award – East Building, National Gallery of Art

== Deaths ==
- May 27 – Sigrid Lorenzen Rupp, German American architect (born 1943)
- August 30 - E. Fay Jones, American architect (born 1921)
- September 12 – Max Abramovitz, American architect (born 1908)
- September 22 — Edward Larrabee Barnes, American architect (born 1915)

== See also ==
- Timeline of architecture
