= Antoinette Robain =

French architect (born 1956)

- Born: December 7, 1956 (age 68)
- Occupation: Architect
- Awards: Prix de l'Équerre d'Argent
- Buildings: Centre National de la Danse de Pantin

Antoinette Robain (born 7 December 1956 in Paris) is a French architect. In 2004, she won the Prix de l'Équerre d'Argent with Claire Guieysse for the Centre National de la Danse de Pantin.
