= Saemoonan Church =

Oldest church in South Korea

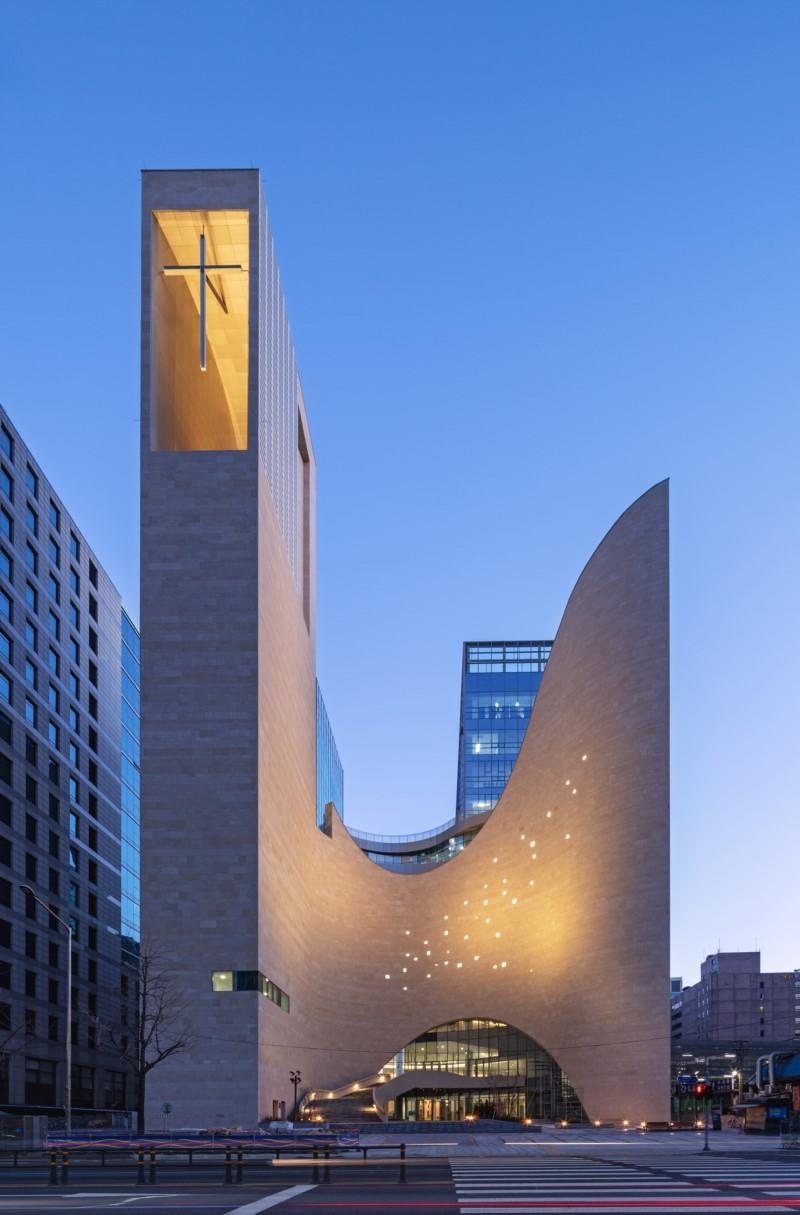
- 6th Chapel (2019)
- Location: Jongno District, Seoul
- Country: South Korea
- Denomination: Presbyterian Church of Korea (TongHap)
- Website: saemoonan.org

History
- Founded: September 27, 1887
- Founder: Horace Grant Underwood

The Saemoonan Church (Korean: 새문안교회) is the first organized Presbyterian church in South Korea, established in 1887 by Horace Grant Underwood, an American missionary who also founded Underwood School (now Kyungsin High School and Middle School), Yonhi College (now Yonsei University), and Severance Hospital. This makes the church the oldest established church in South Korea. It is known as the 'Mother Church of Korean Protestantism.' Prominent figures in modern Korean history, such as Kim Kyu-sik, Ahn Chang-ho, and Choi Hyeon-bae, have been associated with this church.

== History ==
The Saemoonan Church was founded in September 1887 when Horace Grant Underwood baptized one person and appointed two elders in an organization of fourteen Koreans. Over the years, it has gone through 6 different chapels, constructing the latest chapel from 2014 to 2019.

The current senior pastor is Lee Sang-hak, who took over in 2017. He was previously senior pastor at Pohang Cheil Church.

== 6th Chapel (2019) ==
Architect Dongkyu Choi, Seoinn Design Group and Lee Eunseok, an authority in religious architecture, designed the building. The design of the chapel attracted attention from media due to its unconventional design like a mother's arms spread wide, and with much community space.

It is known that during the construction process, the church significantly modified the initial design proposed by the architect. Ironically, the unique external facade that remained from the architect's original plan led to the building's international recognition. There are opinions that the heavily modified interior spaces do not match the external impression. In the architectural community, there are views that the building would have had higher completion if it had been built according to the original plan, and others are relieved that at least part of the original design was retained, preventing any detriment to the cityscape.

The sixth chapel has received multiple accolades in the architecture community, both domestically and internationally.

- In 2019: It became the first church building to win the Cultural Architecture category of the Architecture Master Prize.
- In 2020: It was a finalist for the Building of the Year in the renowned architectural webzine ArchDaily.
- In 2020: It received the Jury Award in the Religious Architecture and Memorials category of the Architizer A+ Awards.
- In 2021: The chapel's curved surface graced the cover of Phaidon's published collection, 'The World's Best Architecture'.

== Controversies ==
=== Controversy in the pastor appointment process ===
Rev. Lee Sang-hak, Senior Pastor of Pohang First Presbyterian Church, received a call to serve as the pastor of Saemunan Church, often regarded as the mother church of Korean Protestantism. He made the decision to accept this call and leave Pohang First Presbyterian Church without informing his congregation in advance. This decision left many church members feeling betrayed and shocked, as the pastoral selection process had been conducted confidentially, leading to internal conflicts within the church. While Rev. Lee explained his departure as aligning with "God's will," many members found it difficult to accept. This incident has highlighted challenges within the pastoral call system in Korean churches and underscored the importance of transparent communication between church leaders and congregants.

=== Lee Sang-hak's dissertation controversy ===
In 2011, Rev. Lee Sang-hak received his doctorate from the Graduate Theological Union in Berkeley, focusing on "Sin and Salvation Based on the Han Experience of Koreans." He argued for shifting the Korean church's traditional judicial model of salvation to an image of healing, a stance that stirred some controversy. Rev. Lee pointed out that overly punitive interpretations of the crucifixion may negatively impact those who have experienced han (deep-seated grief or resentment). Additionally, in one of his sermons, he used the term "illegitimate child" in reference to Jesus' birth. When parts of this sermon were later reposted with certain segments removed, it sparked further controversy. Saemunan Church has since requested an investigation from the Presbyterian University and Theological Seminary.

== See also ==
- Gwanghwamun Plaza
