= Prix de l'Équerre d'Argent =

French architecture award

The Prix d'architecture de l'Équerre d'argent (The Silver T-square Prize) is a French architecture award. This prize was launched in 1960 by "Architecture Française" magazine and its director Michel Bourdeau.

It is given annually by Le Moniteur group for a French building, completed in the past year. The prize is divided equally between the architect and the building owner.

== Award winners ==
The award winners were:

- 1983 – Henri Ciriani for the Crèche, Saint-Denis
- 1984 – Christian Devillers for the Parking des Chaumettes, Saint-Denis
- 1985 – Roland Simounet for the National Picasso Museum, Paris
- 1986 – Adrien Fainsilber for the Cité des Sciences, la Villette, Paris
- 1987 – Jean Nouvel and Architecture Studio for the Institut du Monde Arabe
- 1988 – Christian de Portzamparc for the Dance school for the Paris Opera, Nanterre
- 1990 – Dominique Perrault for the Hôtel industriel Berlier, Paris
- 1991 – Renzo Piano for the 64 rue de Meaux apartments, Paris
- 1992 – Denis Valode and Jean Pistre for the L'Oréal factory, Aulnay-sous-Bois
- 1993 – Jean Nouvel and Emmanuel Cattani for the Lyon Opera House
- 1994 – Henri and Bruno Gaudin for the Stade Charléty in Paris.
- 1995 – Christian de Portzamparc for the Cité de la Musique in Paris.
- 1996 – Pierre-Louis Faloci for the Museum of Celtic Civilisation in Mont Beuvray
- 1997 – Jean-Marc Ibos and Myrto Vitart for the Palais des Beaux-Arts de Lille.
- 1998 – Rem Koolhaas for a house near Bordeaux.
- 1999 – Marc Mimram for the Solférino Bridge
- 2000 – Philippe Gazeau for the extension to the Centre Sportif Léon Biancotto in Paris.
- 2001 – Herzog & de Meuron for social housing in Rue des Suisses, Paris.
- 2002 – du Besset–Lyon for the médiathèque at Troyes.
- 2003 – Yves Lion and Claire Piguet for the French Embassy in Beirut.
- 2004 – Antoinette Robain and Claire Guieysse for the Centre National de la Danse de Pantin.
- 2005 – Florence Lipsky and Pascal Rollet for the Science Library at Orléans-la-Source.
- 2006 – Franck Hammoutène for the extension to Marseille City Hall.
- 2007 – Nathalie Franck and Yves Ballot for the restructuration-extension of the Nuyens school in Bordeaux
- 2008 – Marc Barani for the Tramway stations, Nice
- 2009 – Bernard Desmoulin for the conservatory Léo-Delibes in Clichy
- 2010 – Pascale Guédot for the public library of Oloron-Sainte-Marie
- 2011 – Frédéric Druot, Anne Lacaton, Jean-Philippe Vassal for the rehabilitation of the Tour Bois-le-Prêtre, Paris
- 2012 – Jean-Patrice Calori, Bita Azimi, Marc Botineau (agence Cab) for the Childhood Centre, La Trinité
- 2013 – Kazuyo Sejima + Ryue Nishizawa, SANAA and Celia Imrey + Tim Culbert, Imrey Culbert for the Louvre-Lens Museum
- 2014 – RDAI Architecture for the Cité des métiers Hermès in Pantin
- 2015 – Bernard Quirot architecte + associés for the Maison de santé de Vézelay (Yonne) in the Avallon-Vézelay-Morvan
- 2016 – Muoto architecte + for the "Lieu de vie", campus universitaire Saclay, in the Essonne
