= Centre National de la Danse =

Coordinates: 48.8955°N 2.4020°E

Centre National de la Danse

The Centre national de la danse (CND, or National Dance Center) is an institution sponsored by the French Ministry of Culture. It studies dance in all its aspects, and is located in Pantin, in northeastern Paris. The building is known for being a classic example of Brutalist architecture, and in 2004 was awarded the Prix de l'Équerre d'Argent.

== History ==
Established in 1998 at the initiative of the Ministry of Culture and Communication, the CND is described as being "located at the crossroads of dance culture, creation, dissemination and pedagogy." It was established at Pantin along the Canal de l'Ourcq, and has a permanent office in Rhône-Alpes, Lyon.

The CND provides training and certificate sources for both amateurs and professionals, such as the State diploma of teacher training or dance artists choreographers. It also has an extensive library, open to the public, with different materials including books and videos.

== The building ==
Detail of the building

The building was completed in 1972 by the architect Jacques Kalisz for use as the administrative centre of the city of Pantin. It is considered an example of Brutalist architecture.

Antoinette Robain and Claire Gueysse were selected as architects to resume the work of Jacques Kalisz, and transform it into the Centre National de la Danse (inaugurated in and winning the Prix de l'Équerre d'Argent in 2004). They focused on the treatment of materials and colors inside the building to create a horizontal consistency, while respecting its outward appearance.

== See also ==
- List of Brutalist structures
