= École Nationale Supérieure d'Architecture de Paris-Belleville =

Architecture school in Paris, France

Coordinates: 48°52′27″N 2°22′55″E

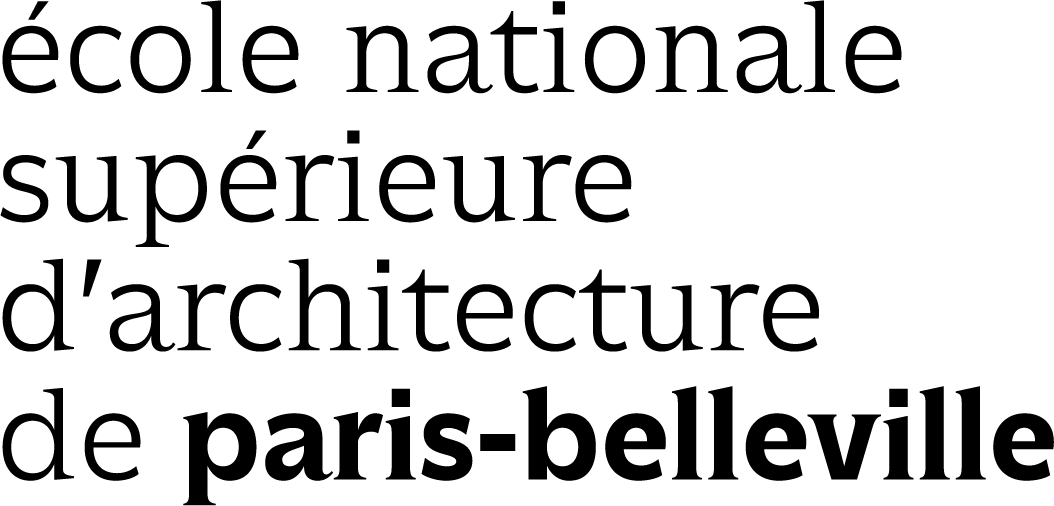
- Type: Public
- Established: 1969
- Chancellor: François Brouat
- Administrative staff: 120
- Students: 1116
- Undergraduates: 411
- Location: Paris, France
- Website: www.paris-belleville.archi.fr

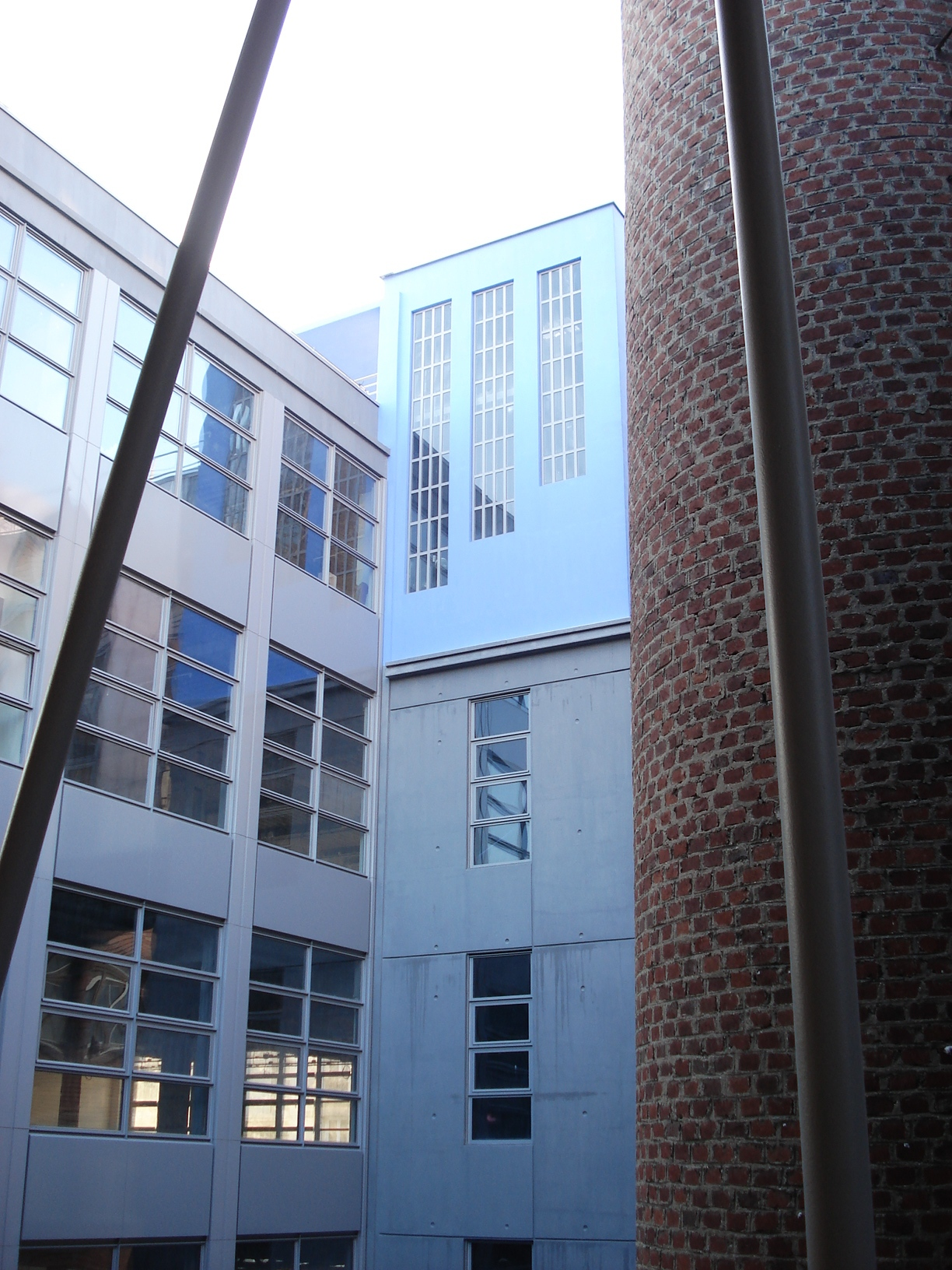

The École Nationale Supérieure d'Architecture de Paris-Belleville is a French grande école and school of architecture. It is currently ranked as the best architecture school in France. The school is recognized for its focus on sustainability, and its students have received awards for adaptable designs encouraging new attitudes towards waste. The school has partnerships with 66 international universities, including La Sapienza in Rome and the University of Hong Kong.

Also, it has incredibly competitive admission criteria;ENSA Paris-Belleville's acceptance rate is 4.9%.

== History ==
The École Nationale Supérieure d'Architecture de Paris-Belleville was founded by a dissident group of students from the École nationale supérieure des Beaux-Arts, l'atelier collégial 1, led by Bernard Huet, in 1965. In 1969 it was officially recognized under the name UP8 (unité pédagogique d'architecture n°8, architectural teaching unit no. 8), and it has since occupied various re-purposed quarters, including Les Halles until their demolition, as well as a former Meccano factory in the Belleville section of Paris. In 2009 it moved into a purposely designed space, a conversion and partial rebuilding of the former site of the Lycée technique Diderot, also in Belleville. In 1986 it was renamed the École d'architecture de Paris-Belleville and UP7 and UP5 were merged into it. It took its current name in 2005.

== Research ==
The research arm of the school is the Institut Parisien de Recherche: Architecture, Urbanistique, Société (IPRAUS), which emphasises interdisciplinary approaches.
