= Henri Ciriani =

Peruvian architect and teacher (1936–2025)

Enrique Ciriani
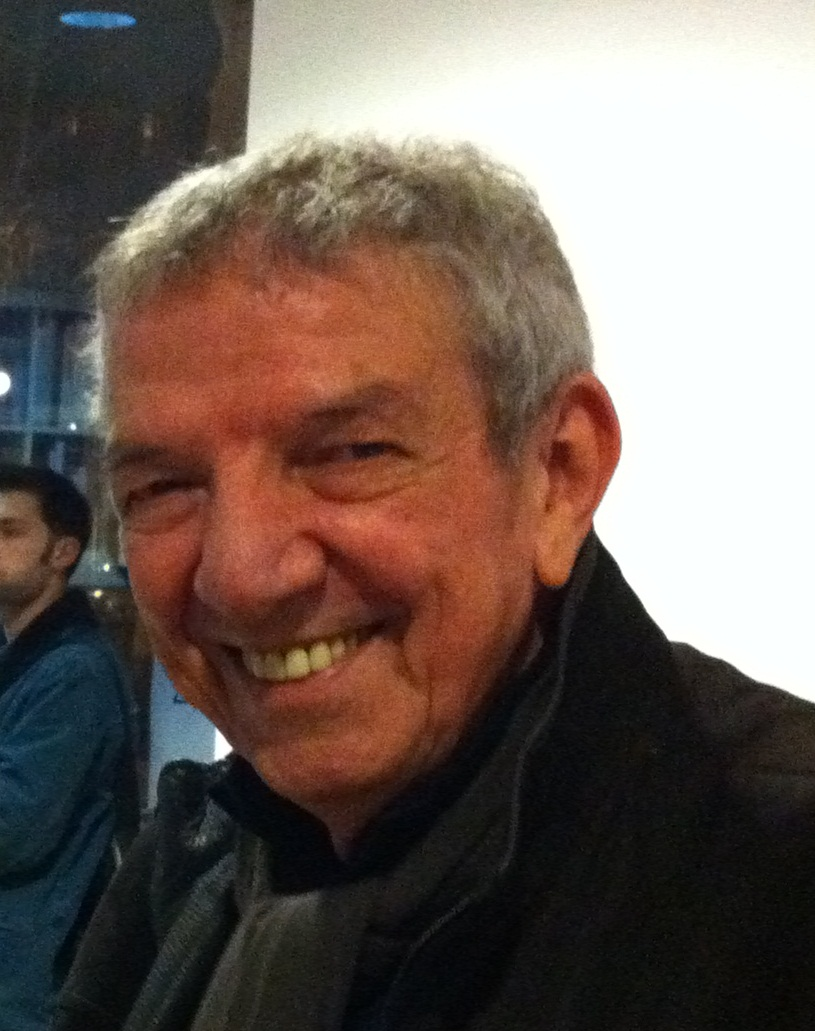
- Ciriani in 2012
- Born: December 30, 1936; Lima, Peru
- Died: October 3, 2025 (aged 88)
- Occupation: Architect

Enrique Ciriani (December 30, 1936 – October 3, 2025) was a Peruvian architect and teacher.

Ciriani was born and worked in Lima, Peru before moving to Paris in 1964. He worked on modernist experimental living projects in the 1960s and 1970s, such as the San Felipe housing complex in Lima, and in 1980 on the Noisy II housing plan for Marne-la-Vallée. He also designed the St. Antoine Hospital kitchen building in Paris in 1985, the Museum of the Great War in Peronne in 1992, and the Archaeological Museum in Arles in 1993.

Ciriani died on October 3, 2025, at the age of 88.
