= 1905 in architecture =

List of years in architecture	(table)
- … 1895; 1896; 1897; 1898; 1899; 1900; 1901; 1902; 1903; 1904; 1905; 1906; 1907; 1908; 1909; 1910; 1911; 1912; 1913; 1914; 1915 …
- Buildings and structures: Art; Archaeology; Architecture; Literature; Music; Philosophy; Science; +...

The year 1905 in architecture involved some significant architectural events and new buildings.

== Events ==
- October 18 – London County Council's new street at Kingsway and redevelopment of Aldwych are opened.
- Work begins on Stoclet Palace, Brussels, designed by Josef Hoffmann.
- Work begins on Casa de les Punxes, Barcelona, designed by Josep Puig i Cadafalch.
- Formation of the Dresden Die Brücke expressionist architecture movement.

== Buildings and structures ==
=== Buildings opened ===
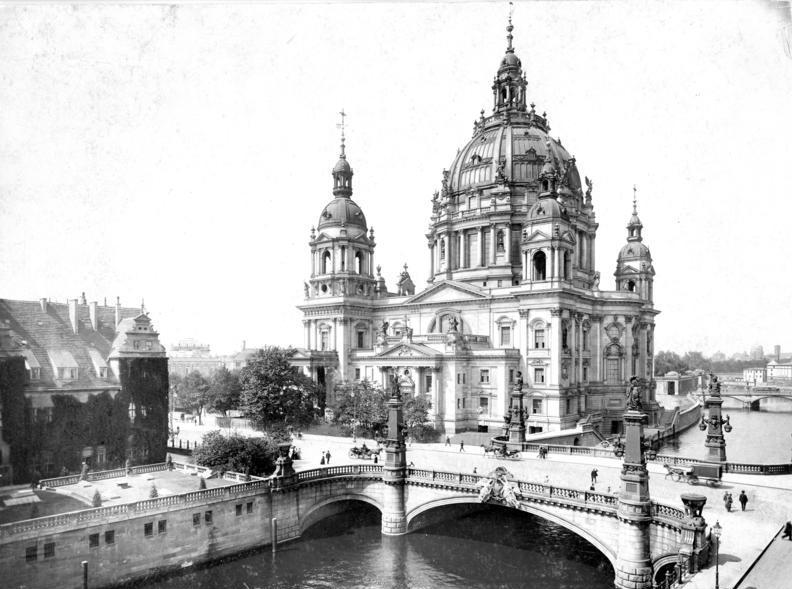
Berlin Cathedral around date of completion

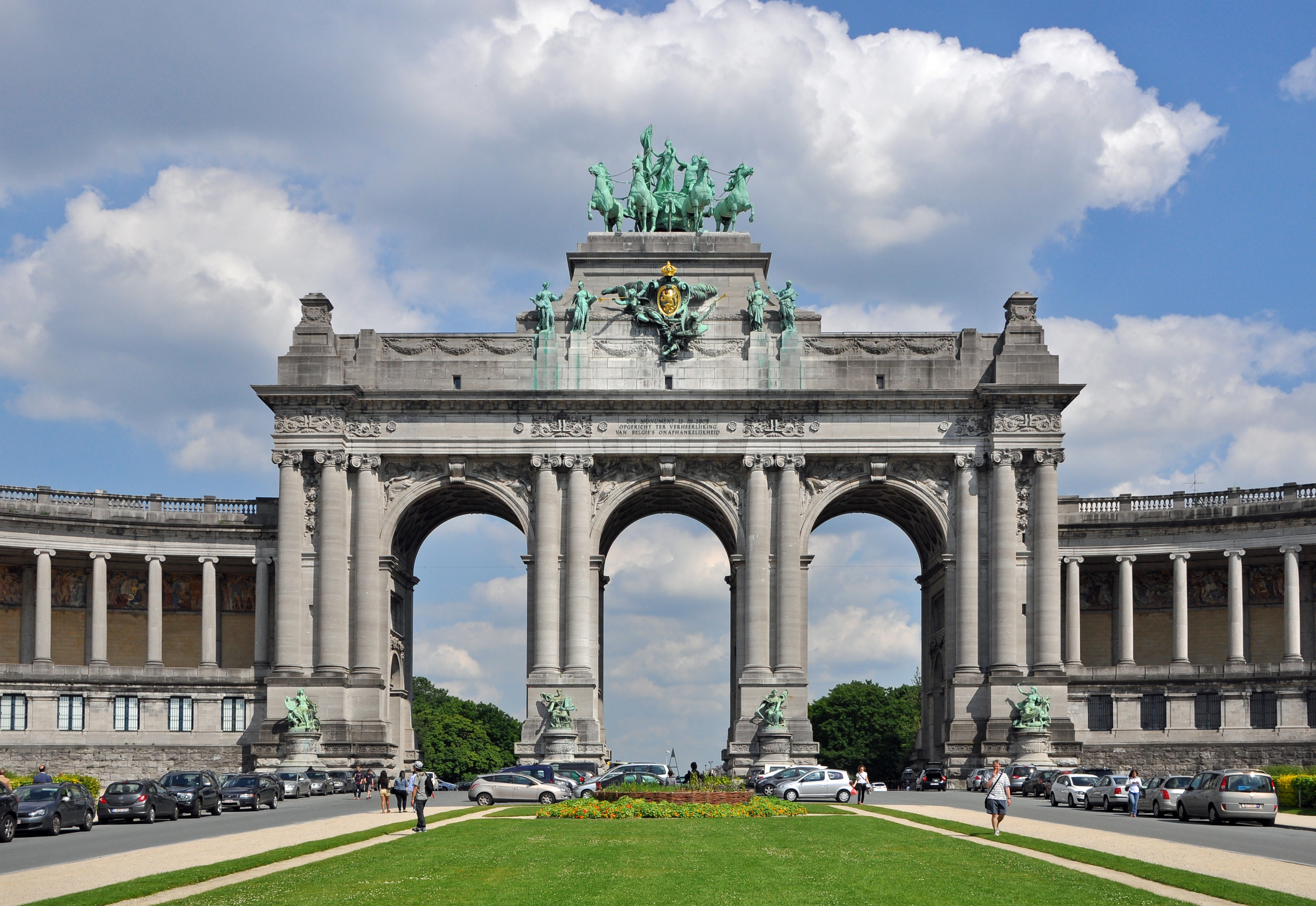
Arcade du Cinquantenaire, Brussels

- February 27 – Berlin Cathedral in Berlin, Germany, is inaugurated.
- June 11 – National Theatre of Venezuela, Caracas, Venezuela
- September 27 – Arcade du Cinquantenaire in Brussels, Belgium, opened by Leopold II of Belgium.
- November – The Plaza Grill and Cinema, Ottawa, Kansas, possibly the oldest movie theater in the United States that is still in operation.

=== Buildings completed ===
- January – Eitel Building in Downtown Seattle, Washington, United States, designed by William Doty van Siclen.
- Darwin D. Martin House in Buffalo, New York, United States, designed by Frank Lloyd Wright.
- Zacherlhaus in Vienna, Austria, designed by Jože Plečnik.
- Land Administration Building in Brisbane, Australia, designed by Thomas Pye.
- St. Stephen's Basilica in Budapest, Hungary, completed by József Kauser to an 1851 design by Miklós Ybl.
- Salepçioğlu Mosque in İzmir, Turkey.
- Chancel and lady chapel to St John the Divine, Richmond, London, England, designed by Arthur Grove.
- Hôtel de ville (city hall) in Sfax, Tunisia, designed by Raphaël Guy.
- National Library of Greece, Athens, designed by Theophil Hansen.
- Parliament House in Stockholm, Sweden is completed.
- Voewood, High Kelling, Norfolk, England, designed by E. S. Prior.
- Antwerpen-Centraal railway station in Belgium, designed by Louis Delacenserie.
- Murry Guggenheim House in West Long Branch, New Jersey, designed by Carrère and Hastings.

== Awards ==
- RIBA Royal Gold Medal – Aston Webb.
- Grand Prix de Rome, architecture: Albert Henry Krehbiel.

== Births ==
- February 13 – Werner Schindler, Swiss architect and Olympic medallist (died 1986)
- March 19 – Albert Speer, German architect and Nazi minister during Adolf Hitler's regime (died 1981)
- April 4 – Erika Nõva, Estonian architect (died 1987)
- April 13 – Bernard Rudofsky, Moravian-born American writer, architect, collector, teacher, designer and social historian (died 1988)
- June 24 – Michael Scott, Irish architect (died 1989)
- December 18 – Roy Grounds, Australian architect (died 1981)

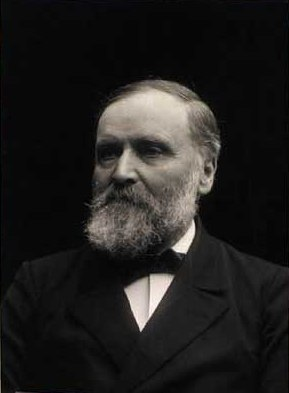
Ludvig Fenger

== Deaths ==
- March 9 – Ludvig Fenger, City Architect of Copenhagen (born 1833
- March 11 — William R. Walker, American architect based in Providence, Rhode Island (born 1830)
- July 24 – Adolf Cluss, German-born American engineer architect in Washington, D.C. (born 1825)
- August 2 – Cesar Castellani, Maltese architect working in British Guiana
- August 22 – Alfred Waterhouse, English architect of the Gothic Revival (born 1830)
