= 1901 in architecture =

List of years in architecture	(table)
- … 1891; 1892; 1893; 1894; 1895; 1896; 1897; 1898; 1899; 1900; 1901; 1902; 1903; 1904; 1905; 1906; 1907; 1908; 1909; 1910; 1911 …
- Buildings and structures: Art; Archaeology; Architecture; Literature; Music; Philosophy; Science; +...

The year 1901 in architecture involved some significant events.

== Buildings and structures ==
=== Buildings ===
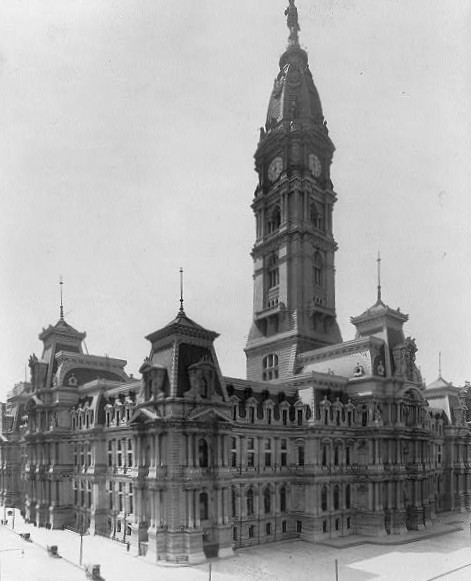
Philadelphia City Hall

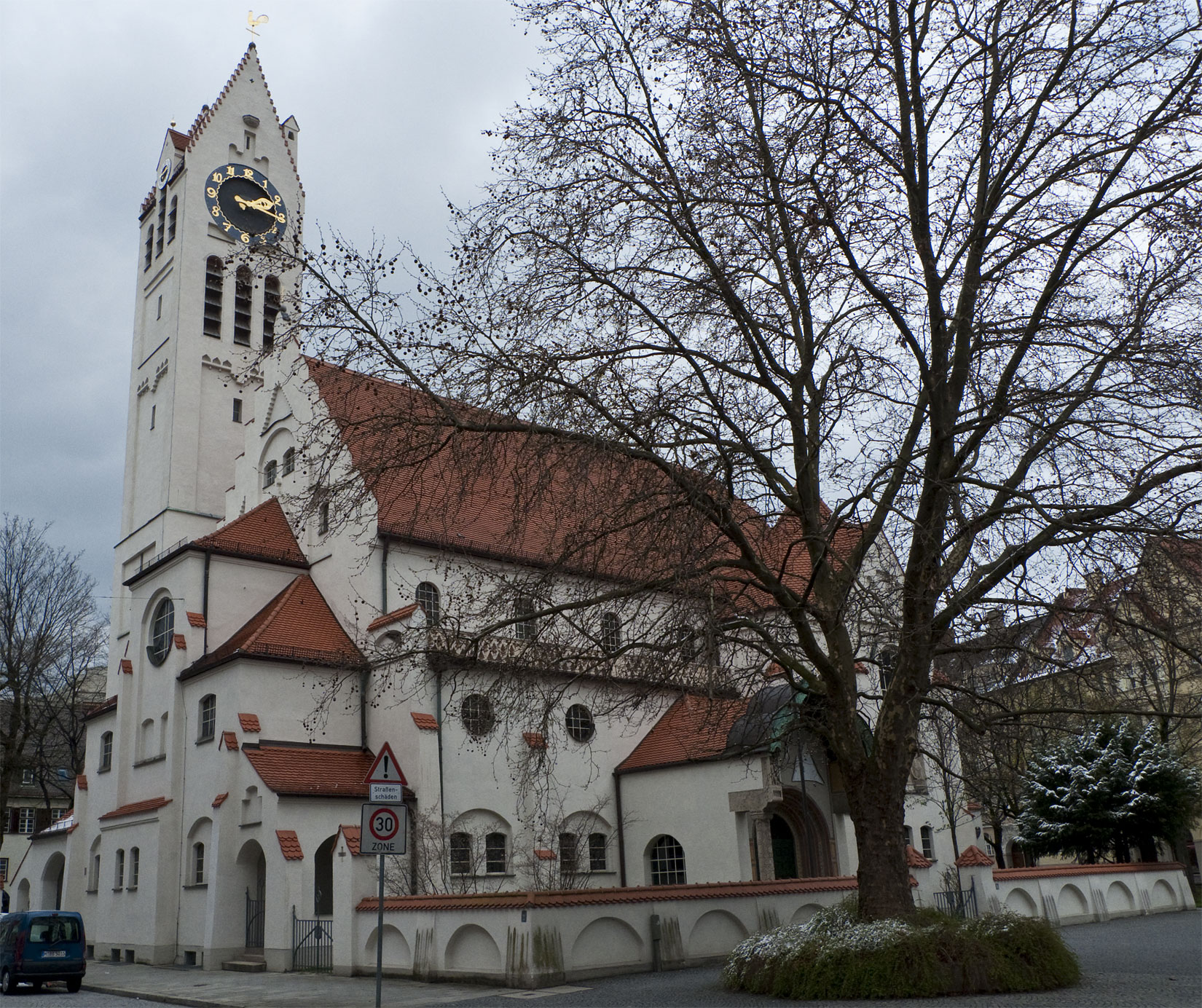
The Erlöserkirche, Munich, Germany

- Federal Court House and Post office for the Upper Midwest, the modern-day "Landmark Center", St. Paul, Minnesota, designed by Willoughby J. Edbrooke, is completed.
- Philadelphia City Hall in Philadelphia, Pennsylvania, designed by John McArthur Jr., is completed, the world's tallest occupied masonry building.
- Stolp Town Hall, in modern-day Słupsk, Poland, designed by Karl Zaar with Rudolf Vahl, is opened.
- Germantown Junction station, North Philadelphia, designed by Theophilus P. Chandler Jr., is completed.
- Moscow Vindavsky railway station, designed by Stanislav Brzhozovsky, is opened.
- Washington Union Station, designed by Daniel Burnham and W. Pierce Anderson, is commissioned.
- Union Trust Company Building in Providence, Rhode Island, designed by Stone, Carpenter & Willson, is completed.
- Postal Savings Bank building (Postatakarékpénztár), Budapest, designed by Ödön Lechner, is completed.
- Wardenclyffe Tower in Shoreham, New York, designed by Nikola Tesla and Stanford White is begun.
- Willits House in Highland Park, Illinois, designed by Frank Lloyd Wright.
- Deanery Garden in Sonning, England, designed by Edwin Lutyens with garden by Gertrude Jekyll, is completed.
- Langer House in Vienna, designed by Jože Plečnik, is completed.
- Whitechapel Art Gallery in east London, designed by Charles Harrison Townsend, is opened.
- Horniman Museum in south London, designed by C. Harrison Townsend, is completed.
- Génin-Louis Grain Shop in Nancy, designed by Henry Gutton and his nephew Henri Gutton, is built.
- Vaxelaire Department Store in Nancy, designed by Émile André and Eugène Vallin, is completed.
- Jakarta Cathedral in the Dutch East Indies, completed by M. J. Hulswit following a design of 1891 by Pastor Antonius Dijkmans, is consecrated.
- Erlöserkirche, Munich, designed by Theodor Fischer, is consecrated.
- Zuoz Bridge, Switzerland, designed by Robert Maillart, is built.
- The Glasgow International Exhibition (1901) is held with new architecture by James Millar and Charles Rennie Mackintosh and transplanted mock Tudor cottages from Port Sunlight.

== Awards ==
- RIBA Royal Gold Medal: Not awarded
- Grand Prix de Rome, architecture: Jean Hulot

== Publications ==
- Barry Parker and Raymond Unwin – The Art of Building a Home

== Births ==
- January 25 – Pablo Antonio, Filipino architect (died 1975)
- February 20 – Louis Kahn, American architect (died 1974)
- April 11 – Bertalan Árkay, Hungarian architect (died 1971)
- April 12 – Thomas Sharp, English urban planner (died 1978)
- June 23 – Amyas Connell, New Zealand-born architect (died 1980)
- September 8 – Judith Ledeboer, Dutch-born English architect (died 1990)

== Deaths ==
- James Brooks, English Gothic Revival architect (born 1825)
- May 25 – J. M. Brydon, British architect (born 1840)
