= 1903 in architecture =

List of years in architecture	(table)
- … 1893; 1894; 1895; 1896; 1897; 1898; 1899; 1900; 1901; 1902; 1903; 1904; 1905; 1906; 1907; 1908; 1909; 1910; 1911; 1912; 1913 …
- Buildings and structures: Art; Archaeology; Architecture; Literature; Music; Philosophy; Science; +...

The year 1903 in architecture involved some significant architectural events and new buildings.

== Events ==
- January 31 – The Sängerhaus in Strasbourg opens with an inaugural concert.
- September – First Garden City Ltd formed to develop Letchworth in England with Barry Parker and Raymond Unwin as architects.
- The Group Plan for the civic center of Cleveland, Ohio, by Daniel Burnham, Arnold Brunner, and John Carrere is released.
- Giles Gilbert Scott wins the competition to design Liverpool Cathedral.

== Buildings and structures ==
=== Buildings completed ===
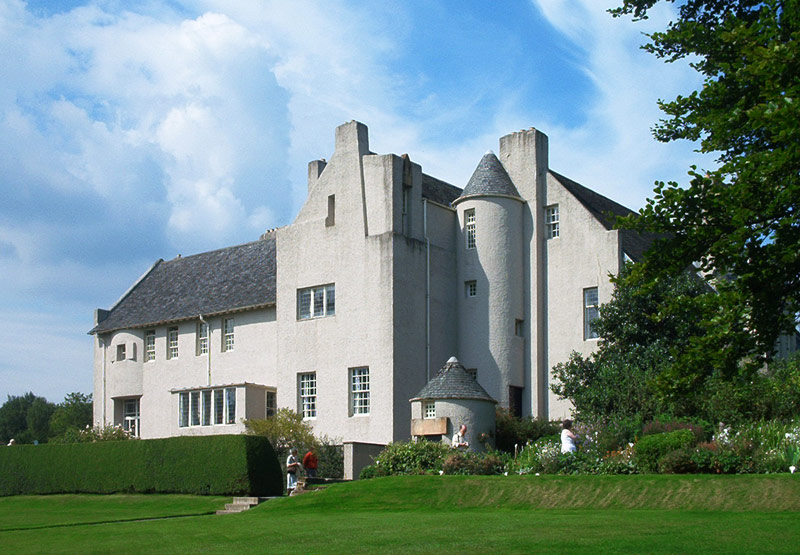
Hill House, Helensburgh, Scotland

- The Beurs van Berlage (Amsterdam Stock Exchange), designed by Hendrik Berlage.
- Hill House, Helensburgh, Scotland, designed by Charles Rennie Mackintosh.
- St Cyprian's, Clarence Gate, London, designed by Ninian Comper.
- St Ignatius Church, Stamford Hill, London, designed by Benedict Williamson, first portion.
- Juselius Mausoleum, Pori, Finland, designed by Josef Stenbäck.
- Palazzo Castiglioni (Milan), Italy, designed by Giuseppe Sommaruga.
- Wemyss Bay railway station in Scotland, rebuilt by James Miller.
- Communal Palace of Buzău, Romania, designed by Alexandru Săvulescu (died 1902).
- 22, Rue du Général de Castelnau in Strasbourg, France, designed by Franz Lütke and Heinrich Backes.
- 56, Allée de la Robertsau in Strasbourg, designed by Lütke and Backes.

== Awards ==
- RIBA Royal Gold Medal – Charles Follen McKim.
- Grand Prix de Rome, architecture: Léon Jaussely.

== Births ==
- January 7 – Ioannis Despotopoulos, Greek architect and academic (died 1992)
- March 7 – Raymond McGrath, Australian-born architect, illustrator and interior designer working in the British Isles (died 1977)
- April 18 – Stephen Dykes Bower, English ecclesiastical architect (died 1994)
- June 17 – A. Hays Town, American architect known for commercial and domestic architecture (died 2005)
- July 16 – Adalberto Libera, Italian Modernist architect (died 1963)
- July 18 – Victor Gruen, Austrian-born architect of shopping malls (died 1980)
- August 21 – F. S. Platou, Norwegian architect (died 1980)
- October 18 – Albert Frey, American "desert modernist" architect (died 1998)
- October 24 – Charlotte Perriand, French architect and designer (died 1999)

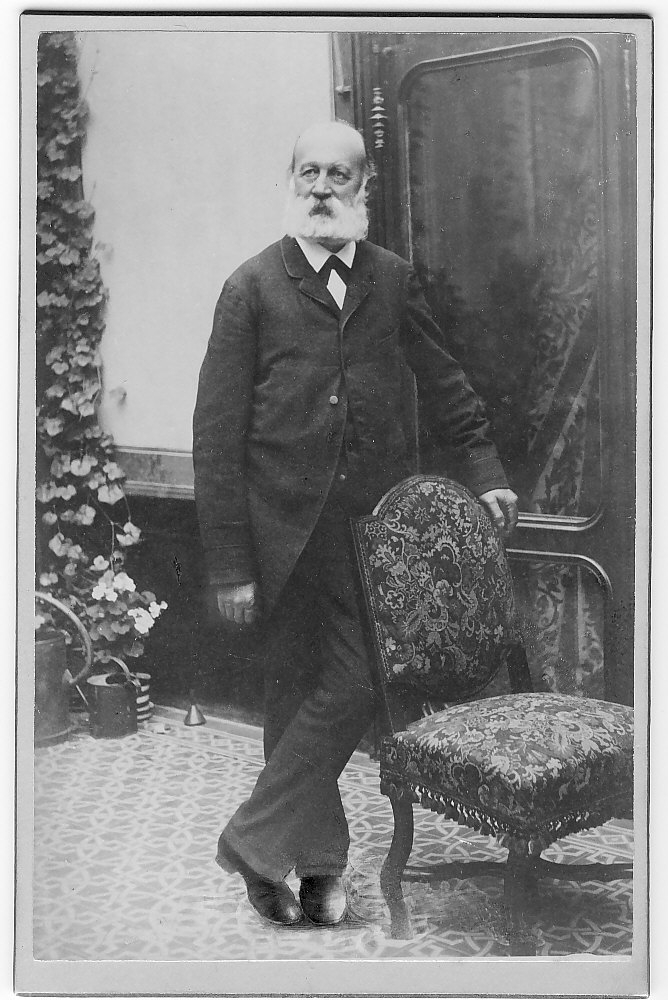
Louis-Daniel Perrier

== Deaths ==
- May 29 – Bruce Price, American architect (born 1845)
- August 28 – Frederick Law Olmsted, American landscape architect, journalist, social critic and public administrator (born 1822)
- November 16 – Camillo Sitte, Austrian architect, painter and city planner (born 1843)
- date unknown – Louis-Daniel Perrier, Swiss architect (born 1818)
