= 1899 in architecture =

List of years in architecture	(table)
- … 1889; 1890; 1891; 1892; 1893; 1894; 1895; 1896; 1897; 1898; 1899; 1900; 1901; 1902; 1903; 1904; 1905; 1906; 1907; 1908; 1909 …
- Buildings and structures: Art; Archaeology; Architecture; Literature; Music; Philosophy; Science; +...

The year 1899 in architecture involved some significant events.

== Buildings and structures ==
=== Buildings ===
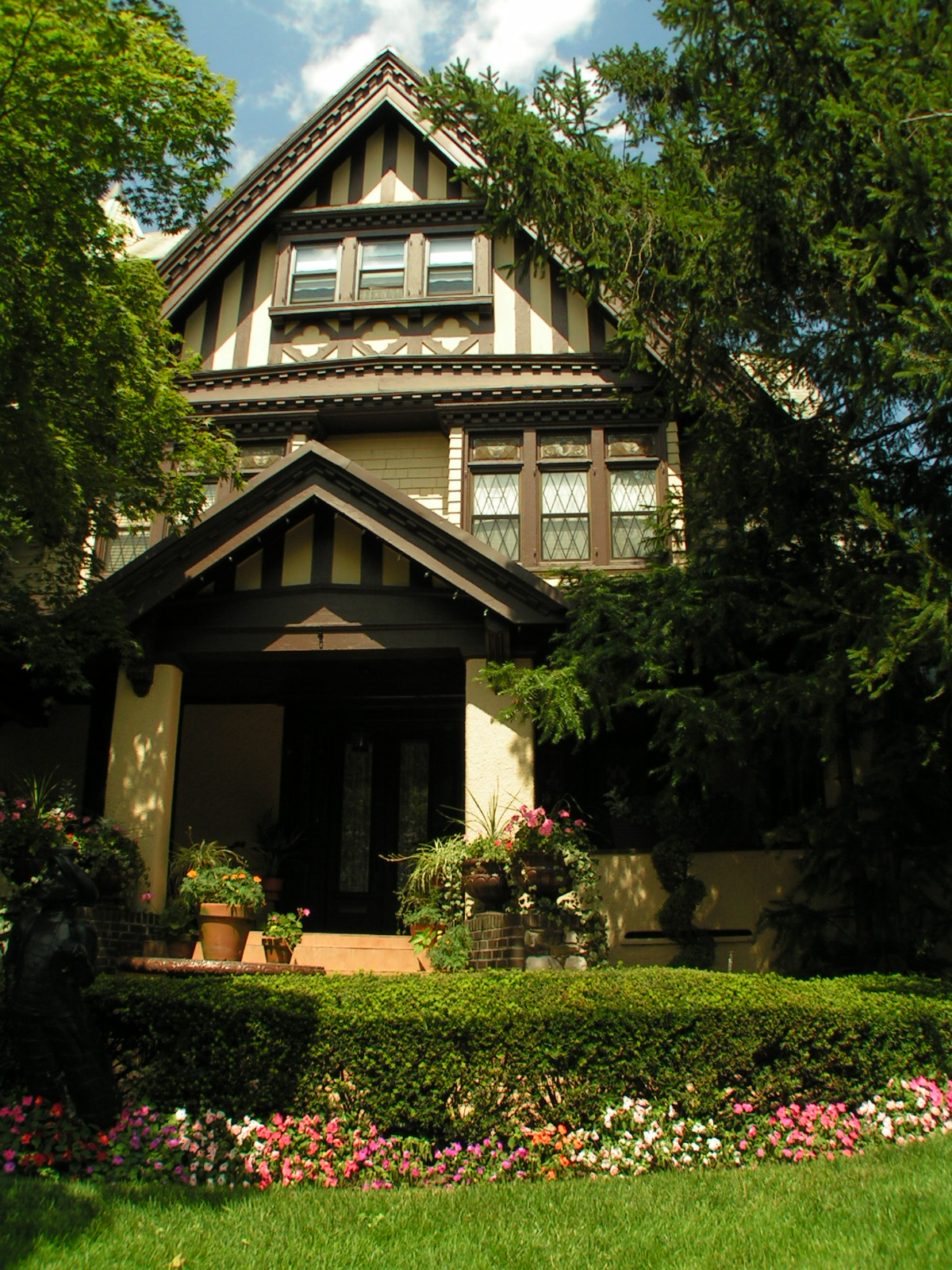
The Saitta House, Dyker Heights, Brooklyn, New York built in 1899.

- March 14 – Church of the Saviour, Baku in Azerbaijan, donated and designed by Adolf Eichler, is consecrated.
- April 2 – Maison du Peuple in Brussels, designed by Victor Horta is officially opened (since destroyed).
- May 28 – The Catholic garrison church St Maurice's church in Strasbourg is inaugurated
- July 20 – Park Row Building in New York City is completed and becomes the tallest building in the world. It holds this title until 1908.
- September 1 – The National Theatre (Oslo) opens in Norway.
- September 18 – Old City Hall in Toronto, Ontario, designed by E. J. Lennox, is inaugurated.
- October – Work begins on St Agatha's Church, Sparkbrook, Birmingham, England.
- October 6 – John Rylands Library in Manchester, England, designed by Basil Champneys, is inaugurated.
- December 15 – Glasgow School of Art opens its new building, the most notable work of Charles Rennie Mackintosh.
- Raffles Hotel, Singapore, designed by Regent Alfred John Bidwell of Swan and Maclaren, is completed.
- Café Museum in Vienna, with interior designed by Adolf Loos, is opened.
- Linke Wienzeile Buildings (apartments), Vienna, designed by Otto Wagner, are completed.
- Hurlands (studio house), Puttenham, Surrey, England, designed by Philip Webb, is completed.
- Engine House No. 33, Manhattan, New York, designed by Ernest Flagg, is built.
- Approximate date – The Saitta House in Dyker Heights, Brooklyn, New York, designed by John J. Petit, is completed. In 2007, it is listed on both the State and National Register of Historic Places.

== Publications ==
- Auguste Choisy – Histoire de l'architecture, with illustrations including axonometric projections
- Ellen Key – Beauty for All (Skönhet åt alla)

== Awards ==
- RIBA Royal Gold Medal – George Frederick Bodley.
- Grand Prix de Rome, architecture: Tony Garnier.

== Births ==
- April 12 – Zeev Rechter, Ukrainian-born Israeli architect (died 1960)
- June 24 – Carl Rubin, Galician-born Israeli architect (died 1955)
- August 5 – Mart Stam, Dutch architect, urban planner and furniture designer (died 1986)
- August 18 – Pietro Belluschi, American Modernist architect (died 1994)
- September 26 – Gertrude Leverkus, German-born architect (died 1976)
- Barry Dierks, American-born Modernist architect (died 1960)

== Deaths ==
- June 8 – Gridley James Fox Bryant, Boston architect and builder (born 1816)
- October 30 – Arthur Blomfield, English ecclesiastical architect (born 1829)
- November 8 – Thomas Newenham Deane, Irish architect (born 1828)
