= 1898 in architecture =

List of years in architecture	(table)
- … 1888; 1889; 1890; 1891; 1892; 1893; 1894; 1895; 1896; 1897; 1898; 1899; 1900; 1901; 1902; 1903; 1904; 1905; 1906; 1907; 1908 …
- Buildings and structures: Art; Archaeology; Architecture; Literature; Music; Philosophy; Science; +...

The year 1898 in architecture involved some significant architectural events and new buildings.

== Buildings and structures ==
=== Buildings ===
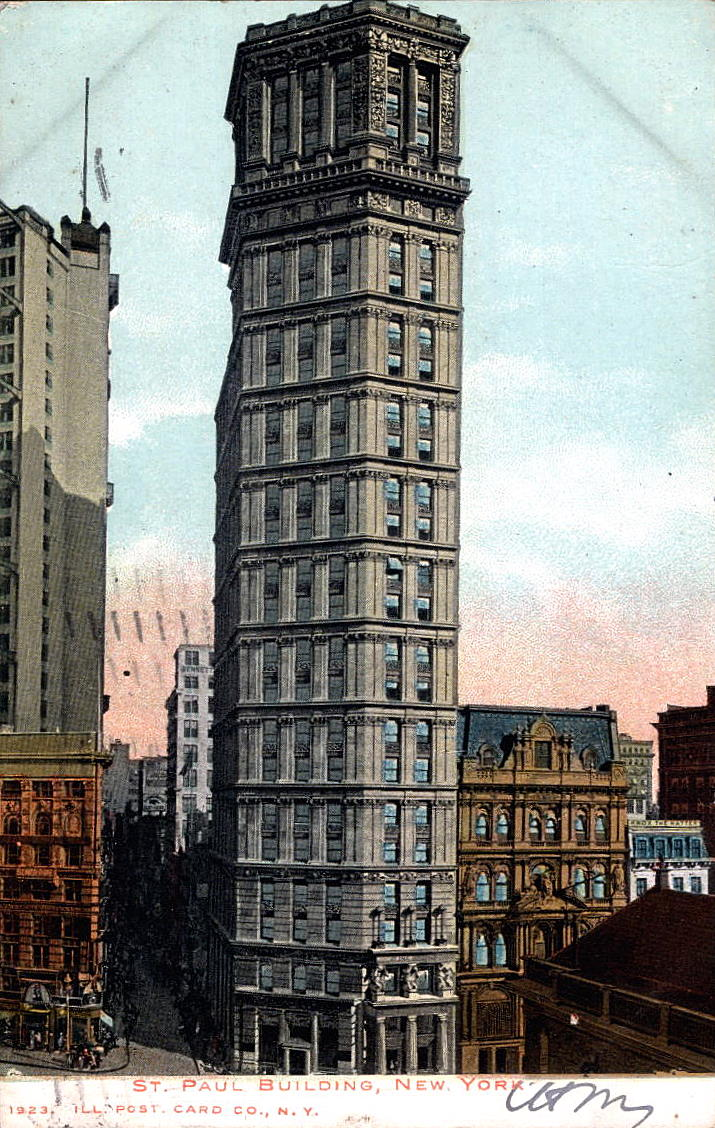
St. Paul Building, New York

- St. Paul Building in New York City is completed as one of the tallest buildings in the world at this time.
- Compton Hill Water Tower in St. Louis, Missouri, designed by Harvey Ellis, is built.
- San Francisco Ferry Building, designed by A. Page Brown, is completed.
- The Queen Victoria Building, Sydney, Australia is completed.
- The British Columbia Parliament Buildings in Victoria, designed by Francis Rattenbury, are opened.
- The Lubyanka Building (headquarters of the All-Russia Insurance Company) in Moscow is built.
- Arts and Crafts movement architect Charles Voysey designs the country houses Broad Leys and Moor Crag overlooking Windermere in the Lake District of England (completed 1900).
- Edwin Lutyens designs Goddards rest home in Abinger, England (completed 1900).
- Construction of Cathedral of Our Lady of Guadalupe in Zamora, Michoacán, Mexico, designed by Jesús Hernández Segura, is begun.
- The New Synagogue of Strasbourg is inaugurated.
- Watts Cemetery Chapel in Compton, Surrey, England, designed by Mary Seton Watts, is completed.

== Events ==
- To-Morrow: A Peaceful Path to Real Reform is published by Ebenezer Howard, calling for the creation of garden cities.
- York and Sawyer architectural practice established in New York City.

== Awards ==
- RIBA Royal Gold Medal – George Aitchison.
- Grand Prix de Rome, architecture: Léon Chifflot.

== Births ==
- February 3 – Alvar Aalto, Finnish architect, designer, sculptor and painter (died 1976)
- February 19 – Steen Eiler Rasmussen, Danish architect and urban planner (died 1990)
- March 4 – Robert Schmertz, American folk musician and architect (died 1975)
- July 15 – William Strudwick Arrasmith, American architect, designer of Greyhound bus stations (died 1965)
- September 20 – Elisabeth Scott, English architect, designer of the Shakespeare Memorial Theatre at Stratford-upon-Avon (died 1972)
- October 4 – Jo van den Broek, Dutch architect (died 1978)
- Giuseppe Samoná, Italian architect (died 1983)

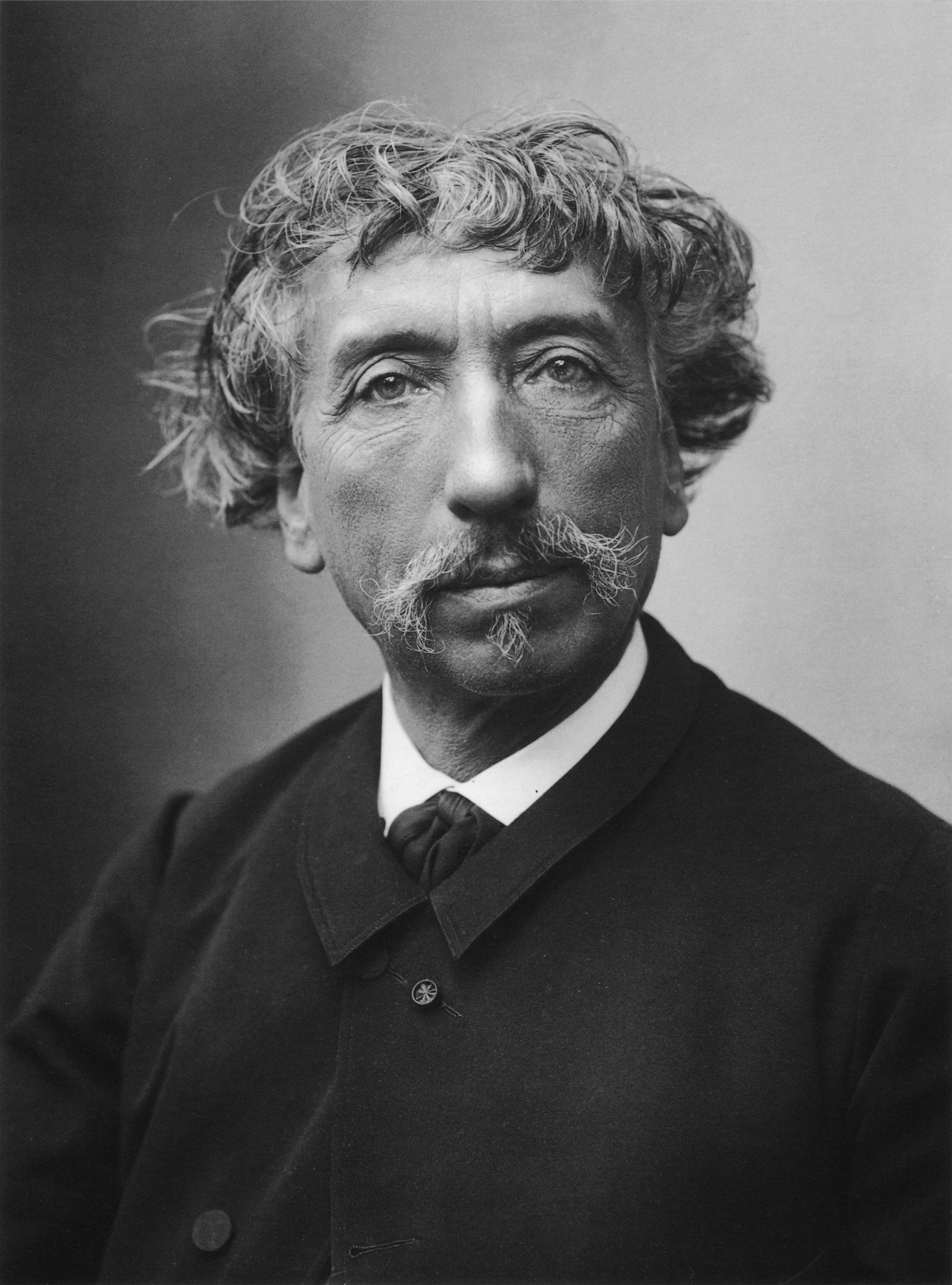
Charles Garnier

== Deaths ==
- August 3
  - John Thomas Emmett, English architect (born 1823)
  - Charles Garnier, French architect (born 1825)
- September 28 – Thomas Fuller, Canadian architect (born 1823)
