= 1896 in architecture =

List of years in architecture	(table)
- … 1886; 1887; 1888; 1889; 1890; 1891; 1892; 1893; 1894; 1895; 1896; 1897; 1898; 1899; 1900; 1901; 1902; 1903; 1904; 1905; 1906 …
- Buildings and structures: Art; Archaeology; Architecture; Literature; Music; Philosophy; Science; +...

The year 1896 in architecture involved some significant events.

== Events ==
- February 21 — The original Union Station in Providence, Rhode Island was destroyed by fire.
- April 16 – The National Trust in England acquires its first building for preservation, Alfriston Clergy House, a 14th century Wealden hall house.
- A History of Architecture by Sir Banister Fletcher is published.
- Construction of Gasometer, Vienna, begins.
- The Arts and Crafts movement house Munstead Wood in Surrey, England, is designed by architect Edwin Lutyens for garden designer Gertrude Jekyll, his first major commission and the start of an influential partnership.
- Casa Martí in Barcelona designed by Josep Puig i Cadafalch.
- Millennial exhibition commemorating the Hungarian conquest of the Carpathian Basin in Budapest: Vajdahunyad Castle is built in City Park by Ignác Alpár, incorporating architectural styles of the Kingdom of Hungary; it is subsequently reconstructed as a permanent building. The Hungarian Parliament Building is inaugurated (although incomplete).

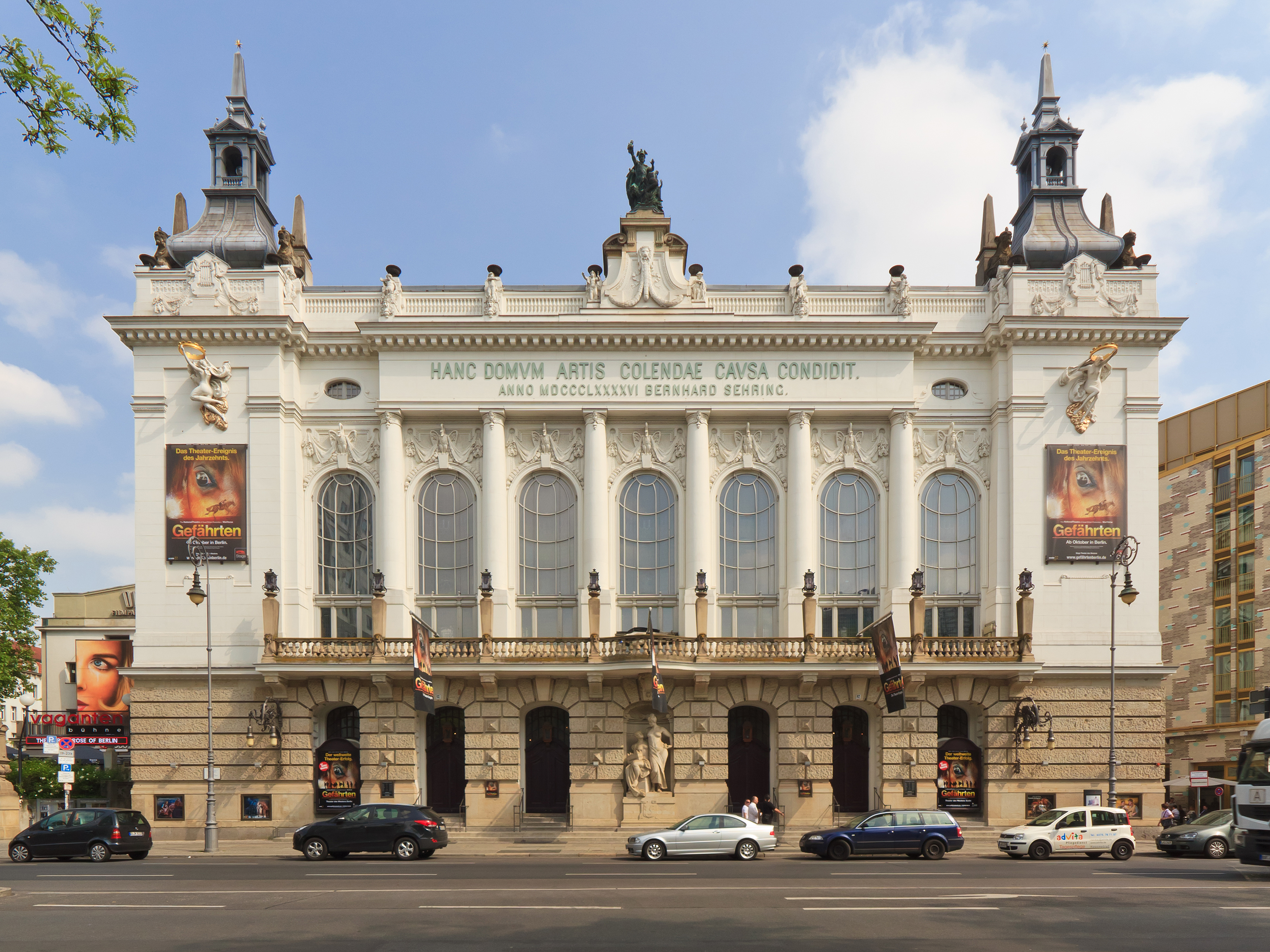
Theater des Westens, Berlin

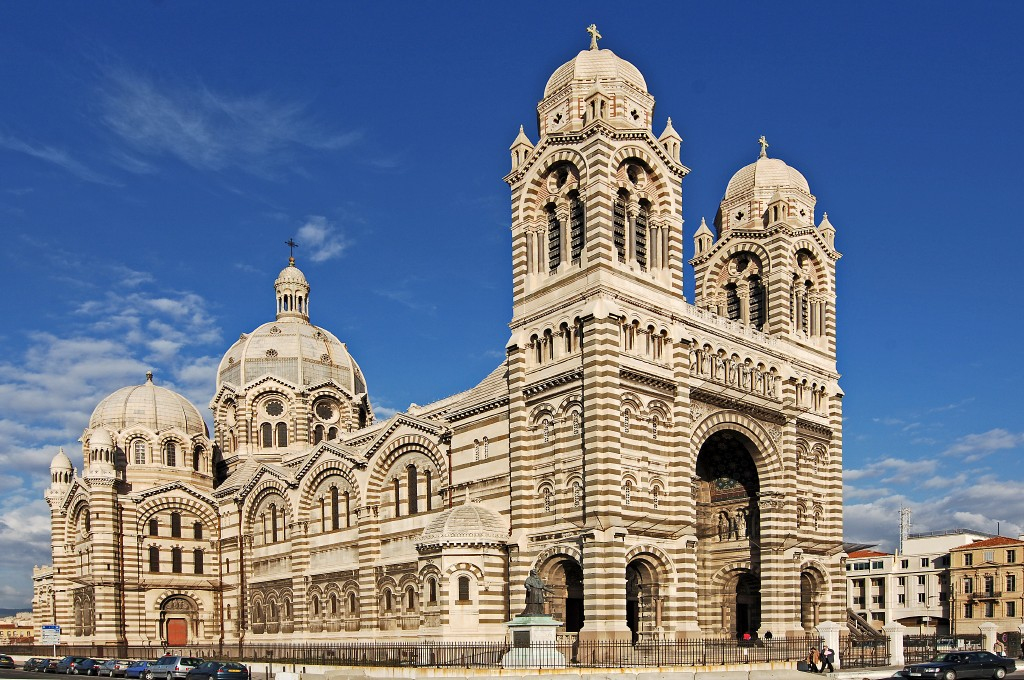
Marseille Cathedral

== Buildings and structures ==
=== Buildings opened ===
- April 16 – 1896 Summer Olympics, the first modern international Olympic Games, open at the Panathinaiko Stadium, Athens, reconstructed to designs by architects Anastasios Metaxas and Ernst Ziller.
- May 14 – Garth Pier, Bangor, Wales, designed by J. J. Webster.
- October 1 – Theater des Westens, Berlin, designed by Bernhard Sehrings.

=== Buildings completed ===
- Annesley Lodge, Hampstead, designed by Charles Voysey.
- Church of Sant'Anselmo all'Aventino, Rome, Italy, by Francesco Vespignani.
- Marseille Cathedral, France, principally by Léon Vaudoyer and Henri-Jacques Espérendieu.
- National Gallery of Slovenia, Ljubljana, designed by František Škabrout.
- Museum of Applied Arts, Budapest, designed by Ödön Lechner.
- Temple Building (Toronto), Canada, designed by George W. Gouinlock (demolished 1970)
- Temple of Human Passions, Cinquantenaire Park, Brussels, Belgium, designed by Victor Horta.

== Awards ==
- RIBA Royal Gold Medal – Ernest George.
- Grand Prix de Rome, architecture: Louis-Charles-Henri Pille.

== Births ==
- July 15 – Alfred Albini, Croatian architect and urban planner (died 1978)
- Nugent Cachemaille-Day, English ecclesiastical architect (died 1976)

== Deaths ==
- October 3 – William Morris, socialist artist, interior designer and writer, associated with the Pre-Raphaelite Brotherhood and the English Arts and Crafts Movement (born 1834)
