= 1911 in architecture =

The year 1911 in architecture involved some significant architectural events and new buildings.

== Events ==
- March 25 – The Triangle Shirtwaist Factory fire shows up the need for improved safety standards in New York City buildings.
- April 4 – Foundation stone of Castle Drogo, a country house in Devon, England designed by Edwin Lutyens, laid; it will not be completed until 1930.
- May 23 – The competition to design Canberra, Australia's new capital, is won by American architect Walter Burley Griffin. In the same year, Griffin marries fellow architect Marion Lucy Mahony.

== Buildings and structures ==
=== Buildings opened ===
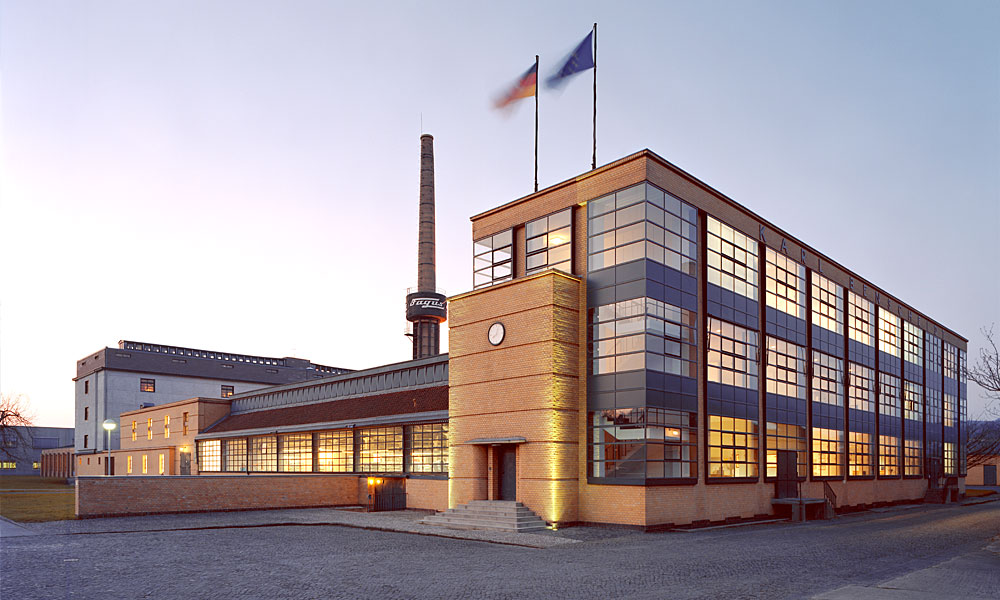
Fagus Factory at Alfeld, Germany

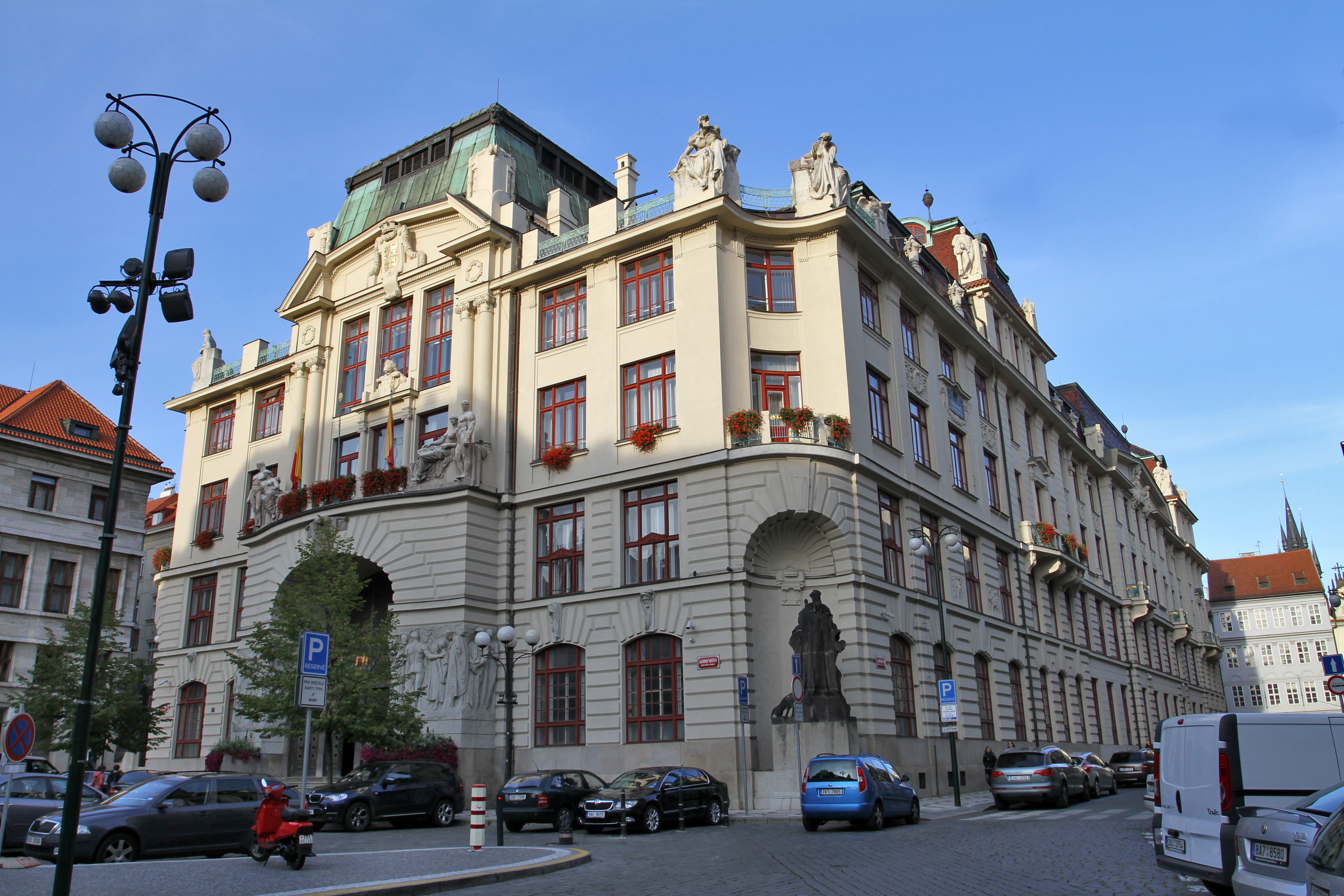
New City Hall (Prague), Czech Republic

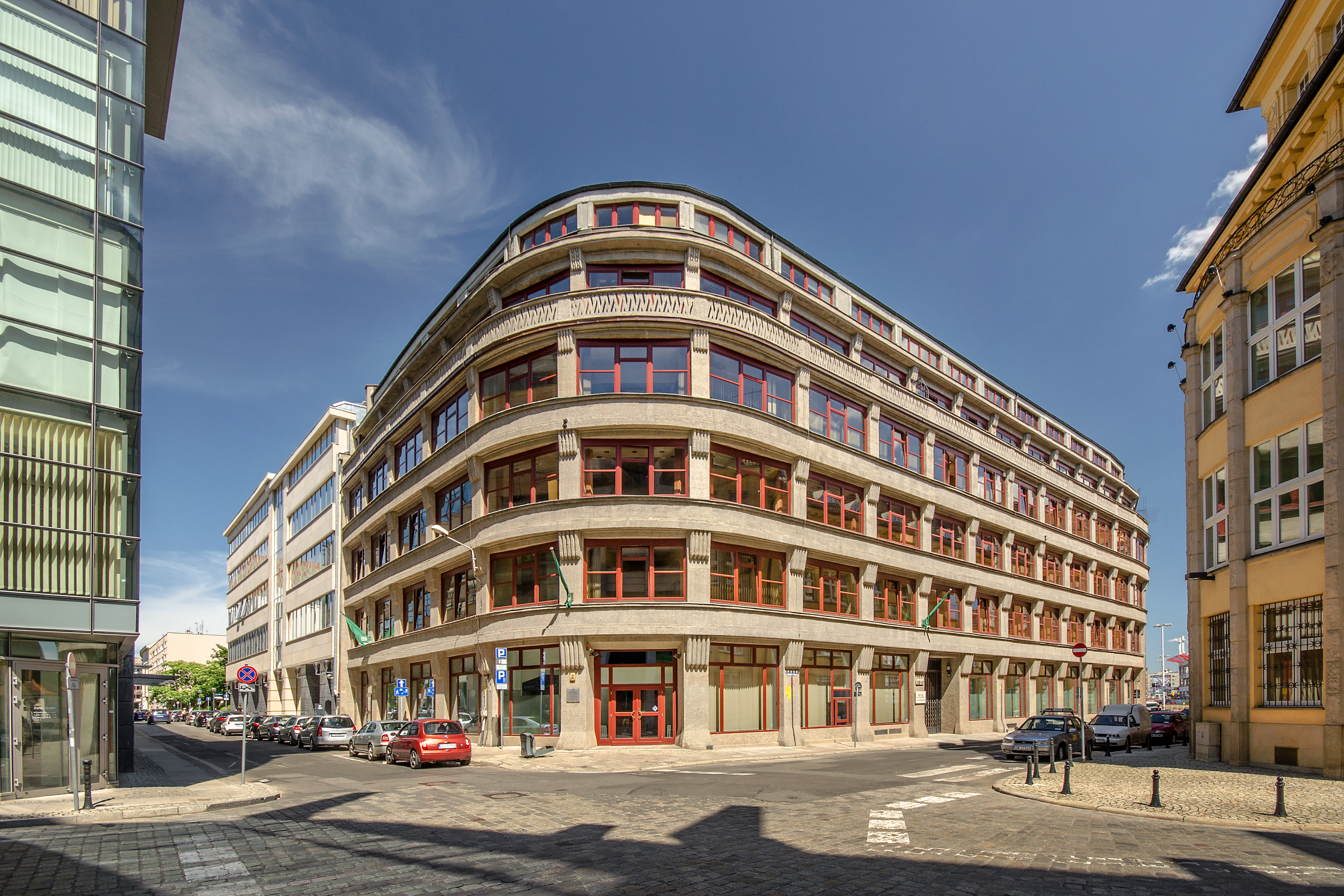
Geschäftshaus Junkernstraße by Hans Poelzig, Breslau/Wrocław, 1911

- May 23 – New York Public Library Main Branch, designed by Carrère and Hastings.
- September 12 – Theatro Municipal (São Paulo), designed by Ramos de Azevedo.
- c. September – Altare della Patria (Monumento Nazionale a Vittorio Emanuele II) in Rome, designed by Giuseppe Sacconi (died 1905) in 1884 inaugurated; it will not be completed until 1925.

=== Buildings completed ===
- Brasserie Excelsior and Angleterre Hotel in Nancy, France, designed by Lucien Weissenburger and Alexander Mienville, with ironwork and interiors by Louis Majorelle and stained glass by Jacques Grüber.
- Fagus Factory at Alfeld, an der Leine, designed by Walter Gropius and Adolf Meyer.
- American Bank Note Company Printing Plant in New York City, designed by Kirby, Petit & Green.
- Frank Lloyd Wright builds his Taliesin house and studio in Spring Green, Wisconsin.
- Horwood House in Buckinghamshire, England, designed by Detmar Blow, is completed.
- King Edward Building for the General Post Office in the City of London, designed by Henry Tanner, an early use of Hennebique reinforced concrete.
- Royal Liver Building, Liverpool, England, designed by Walter Aubrey Thomas.
- Eagle Insurance Building, Manchester, England, designed by Charles Henry Heathcote.
- New City Hall (Prague), designed by Osvald Polívka.
- Church of St Cuthbert Mayne, Launceston, Cornwall, designed by Arthur Langdon.
- Berlin-Pankow station, designed by Karl Cornelius and Ernst Schwartz.
- Monroe Street Bridge in Spokane, Washington.

== Awards ==
- AIA Gold Medal – George Browne Post.
- RIBA Royal Gold Medal – Wilhelm Dorpfeld.
- Grand Prix de Rome, architecture: René Mirland.

== Births ==
- March 24 – Jane Drew, English modernist architect and town planner (died 1996)
- July 16 – John Lautner, American architect (died 1994)
- December – Tom Ellis, English architect (died 1988)
- David Wyn Roberts, Welsh-born architect (died 1982)

== Deaths ==
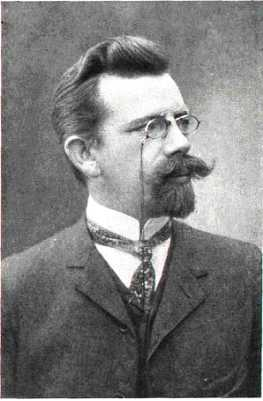
Adolf Eichler

- February 5 – Adolf Eichler, German architect working in Baku (suicide; born 1869)
- November 15 – Philip Gengembre Hubert, French-born New York architect (born 1830)
