= 1833 in architecture =

The year 1833 in architecture involved some significant events.

== Buildings and structures ==
=== Buildings ===
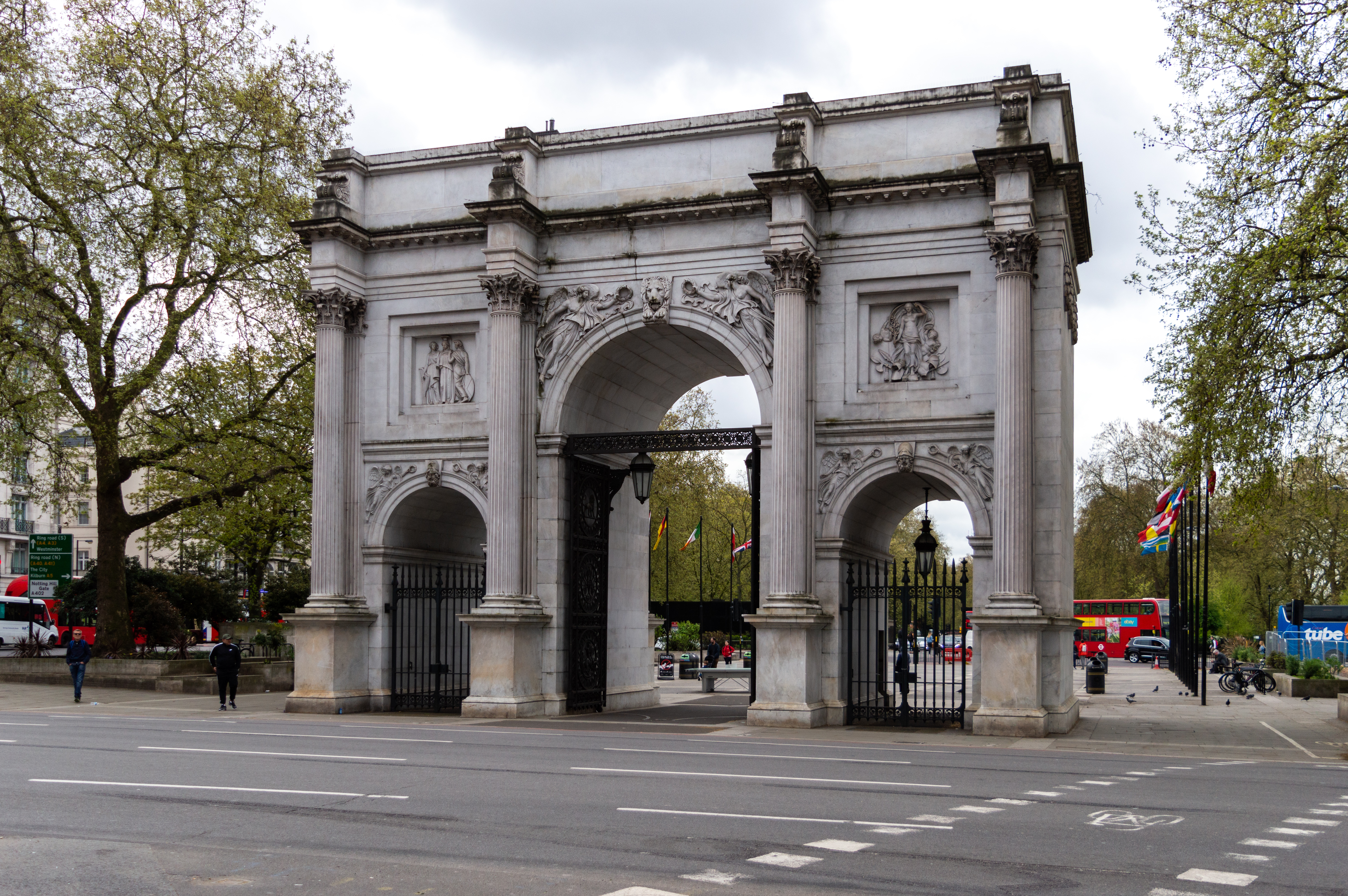
Marble Arch in London, England

- Carlton House Terrace in London, designed by John Nash, is completed.
- Marble Arch in London, adapted by Edward Blore from a design by John Nash, is completed on its original site.
- Vermont State House in Montpelier, Vermont, United States, designed by Ammi B. Young is completed.
- Hotel Seurahuone, Helsinki, Finland, designed by Carl Ludvig Engel, is completed.
- The Grand Theatre, Warsaw, Poland, designed by Antonio Corazzi, is opened.

== Awards ==
- Grand Prix de Rome, architecture: Victor Baltard.

== Births ==
- January 1 – Robert Lawson, Scottish-born architect working in Australasia (died 1902)
- March – Frederick Pepys Cockerell, English architect (died 1878)
- May 23 – E. W. Godwin, English architect and designer (died 1886)
- July 15 – Christian Jank, Bavarian architect (died 1888)
- July 20 – Karl Hasenauer, Austrian architect (died 1894)
- July 31 – Édouard Deperthes, French architect (died 1898)

== Deaths ==
- December 18 – Jean-Charles Krafft, Austrian-born French architect (born 1764)
