= 1830 in architecture =

The year 1830 in architecture involved some significant events worldwide.

== Buildings and structures ==
=== Buildings ===
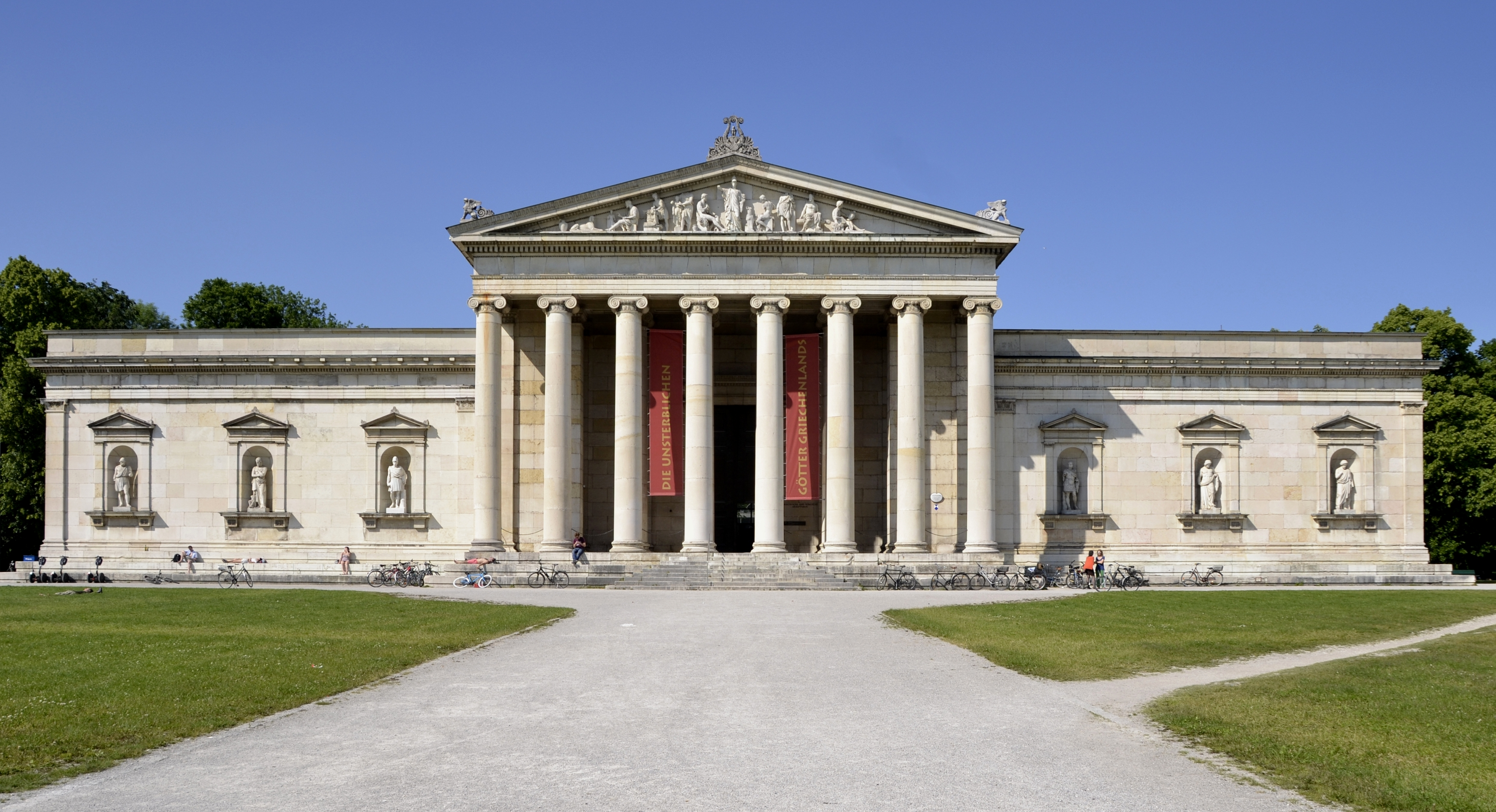
The Glyptothek in Munich, Germany

- The Altes Museum in Berlin, designed by Karl Friedrich Schinkel, which was begun in 1823, is completed.
- The Glyptothek museum in Munich, designed by Leo von Klenze, is completed.
- The Museo Correr, a museum in Venice, Italy, is established.
- The Yorkshire Museum in York, England is completed.
- The Wellington Arch in London, designed by Decimus Burton, is completed in its original position.
- St Mary's Church, Bramall Lane, Sheffield, England, designed by Joseph Potter, is consecrated.
- Old Mosque, Ufa, Russia.
- Liverpool and Manchester Railway opened in England. The two original terminuses are Crown Street station in Liverpool and Liverpool Road station in Manchester.

== Births ==
- April 14 — William R. Walker, American architect based in Providence, Rhode Island (died 1905)
- June 7 – Edward Middleton Barry, English architect (died 1880)
- July 19 – Alfred Waterhouse, English architect (died 1905)
- November 7 – Emanuele Luigi Galizia, Maltese architect and civil engineer (died 1907)
- Approximate date – John Giles, English architect (died 1900)

== Deaths ==
- September 15 – François Baillairgé, Canadian artist, woodcarver and architect (born 1759)
