= Słupsk Town Hall =

Historic building in Słupsk, Poland

Coordinates: 54°27′53″N 17°01′37″E

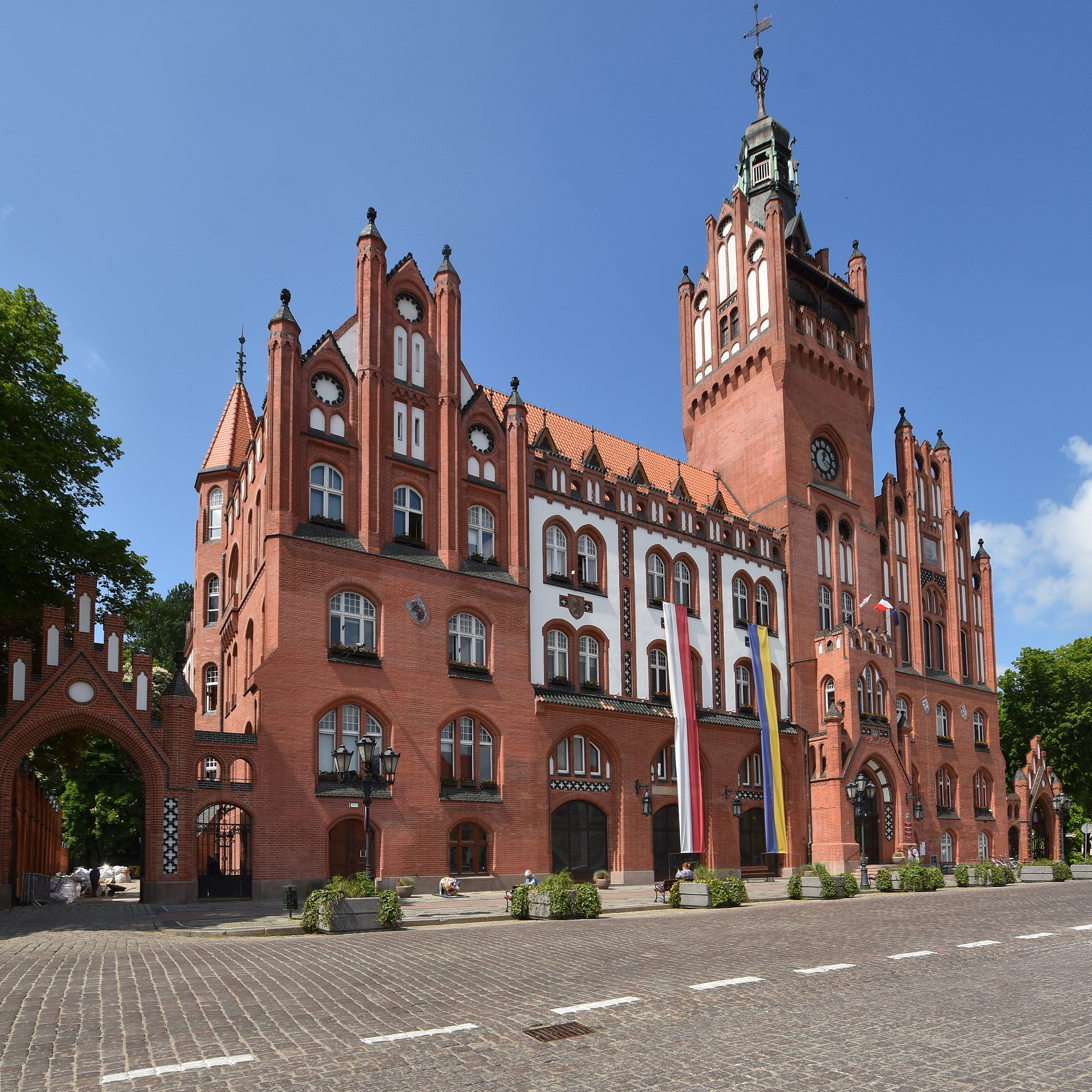
- Słupsk Town Hall
- Interactive map of the Słupsk Town Hall area

General information
- Architectural style: Gothic Revival
- Location: Słupsk, Poland
- Construction started: 1899
- Completed: 1901
- Cost: 300,000 marks
- Client: Słupsk Town Council

Design and construction
- Architects: Karl Zaar; Rudolf Vahl

The Słupsk Town Hall (Polish: Ratusz w Słupsku, German: Rathaus in Stolp) is the chief administrative building of Słupsk, a town in northwestern Poland. The town hall was completed in 1901 in the Gothic Revival style and is a listed heritage monument protected by Polish law. The building continues to serve as the official residence of the town council.

== History ==
The Gothic Revival style town hall was built near Plac Zwycięstwa (Victory Square). At the time, the town was under Prussian rule.

The town hall is located on the site of a lake. In the second half of the 19th-century, the lake was filled in with sand from the Northern Wood. As a result, Victory Square and the surrounding area developed into a suburb. The expanded city outgrew its 1798 town hall that was beginning to collapse. The town purchased the site of the former hospital on Tuwima Street to construct a replacement building.

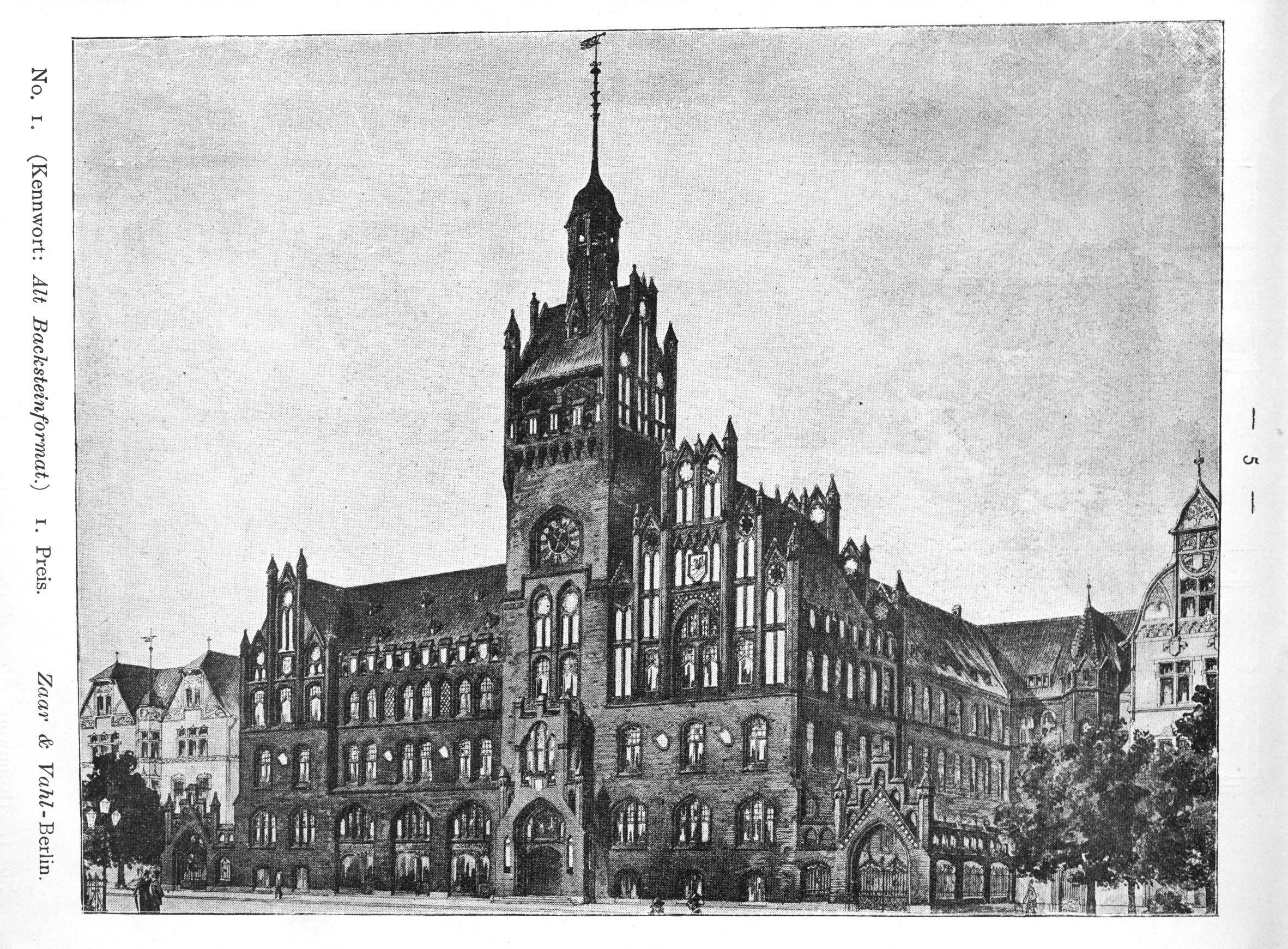
Słupsk Town Hall, early 20th-century

In 1897, the town council held a design contest for a new town hall. Architect Hugo Licht, who designed the New Town Hall in Leipzig, led the selection committee. On 16 and 17 May 1898, the 87 contest entries were displayed to the public at the primary school on Deotymy Street. The committee selected Karl Zaar's design for a Gothic revival building.

On 17 July 1899, architect Rudolf Vahl drafted the blueprints for a 23,176 square metres (249,460 sq ft) building. He added rosettes on the ceiling, arabesques on the stairs, and the mayor's desk. Its cost was 300,000 marks, exceeding the budget previously set by the town. Construction began in 1899. The building was completed on 22 September 1900, and all construction workers received a beer. On 5 July 1901, an opening celebration took place.

It is one of the few buildings in the city that survived World War II almost untouched.

== Notable features ==
Interior

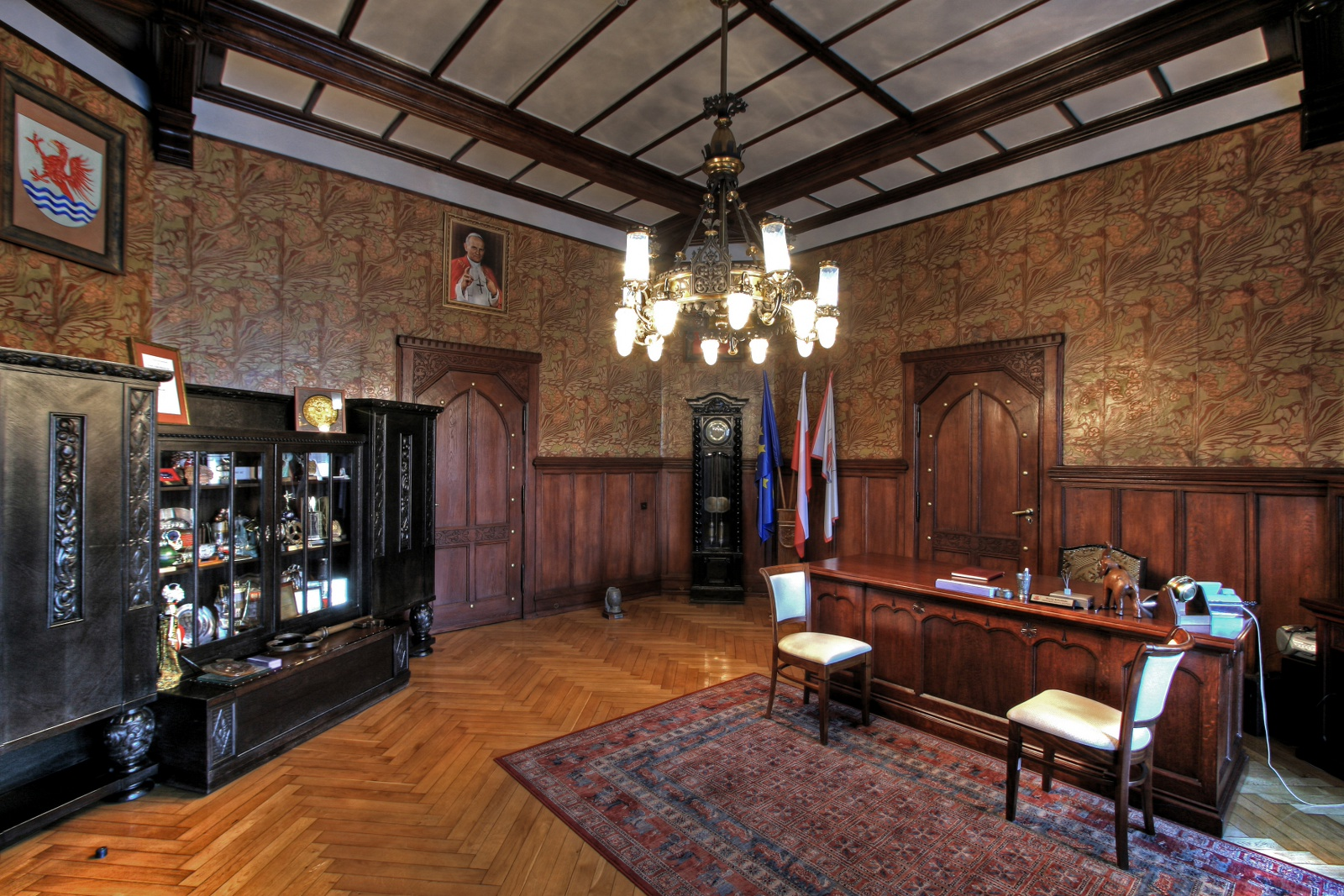
President's office

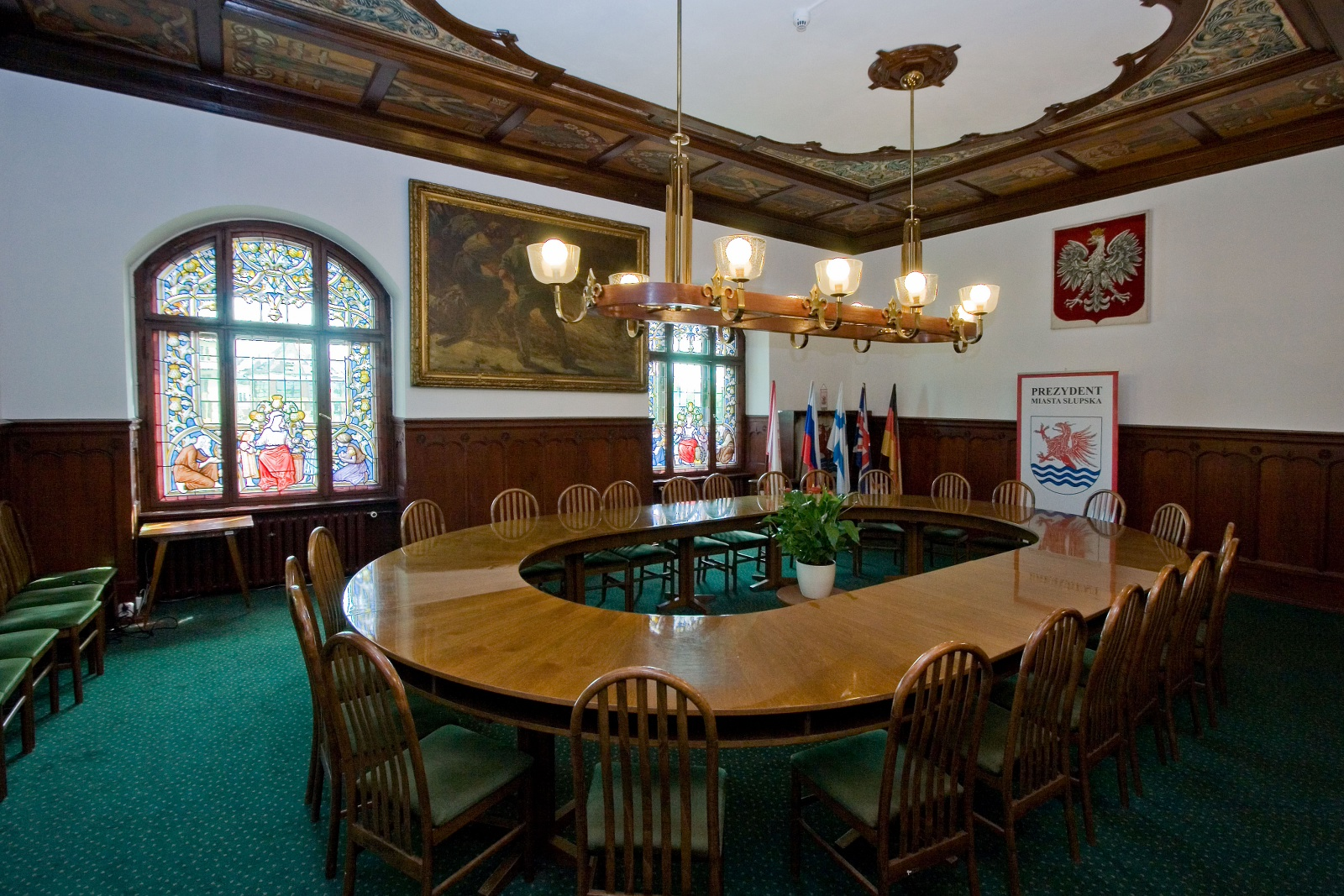
Conference room 110

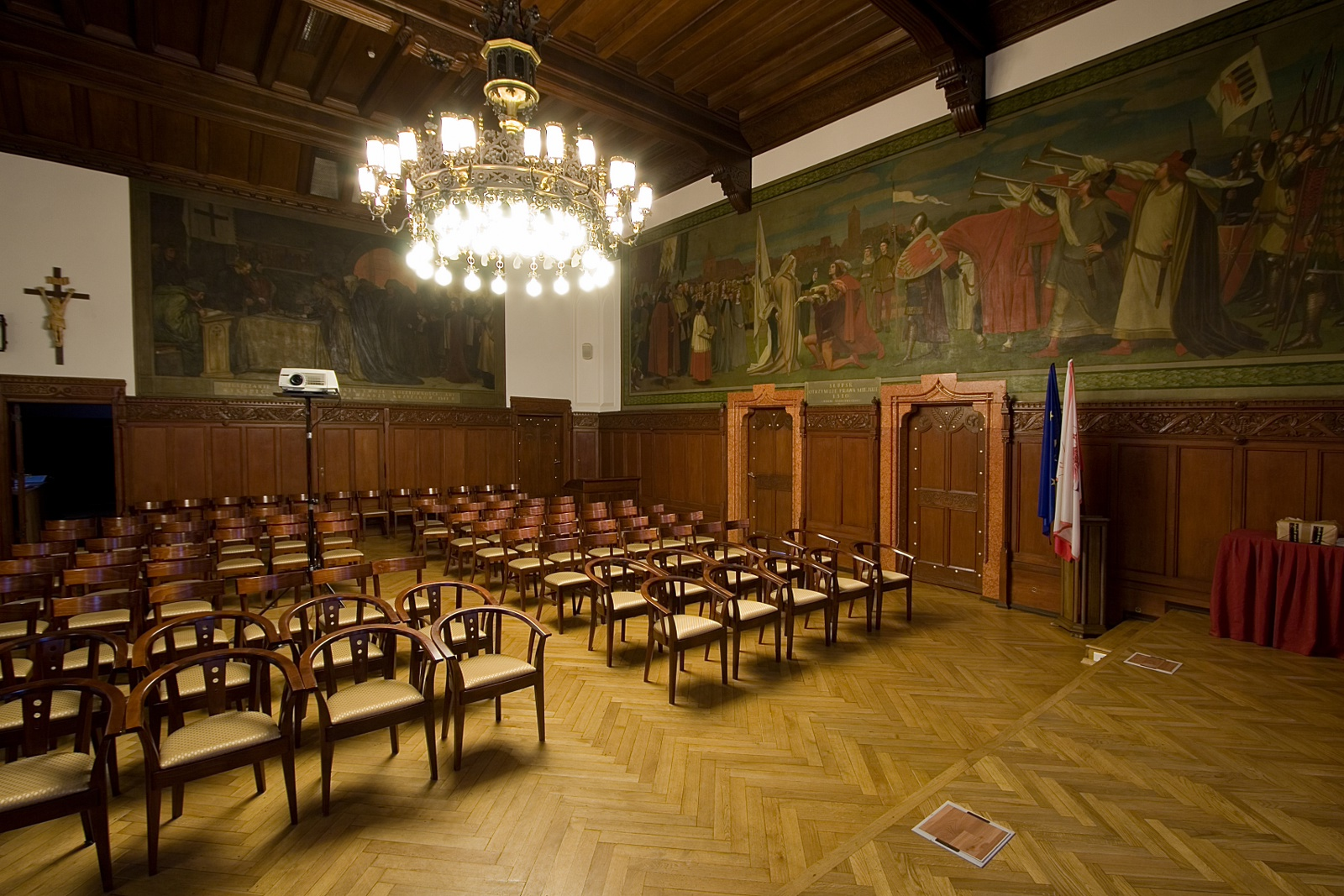
Conference room 211

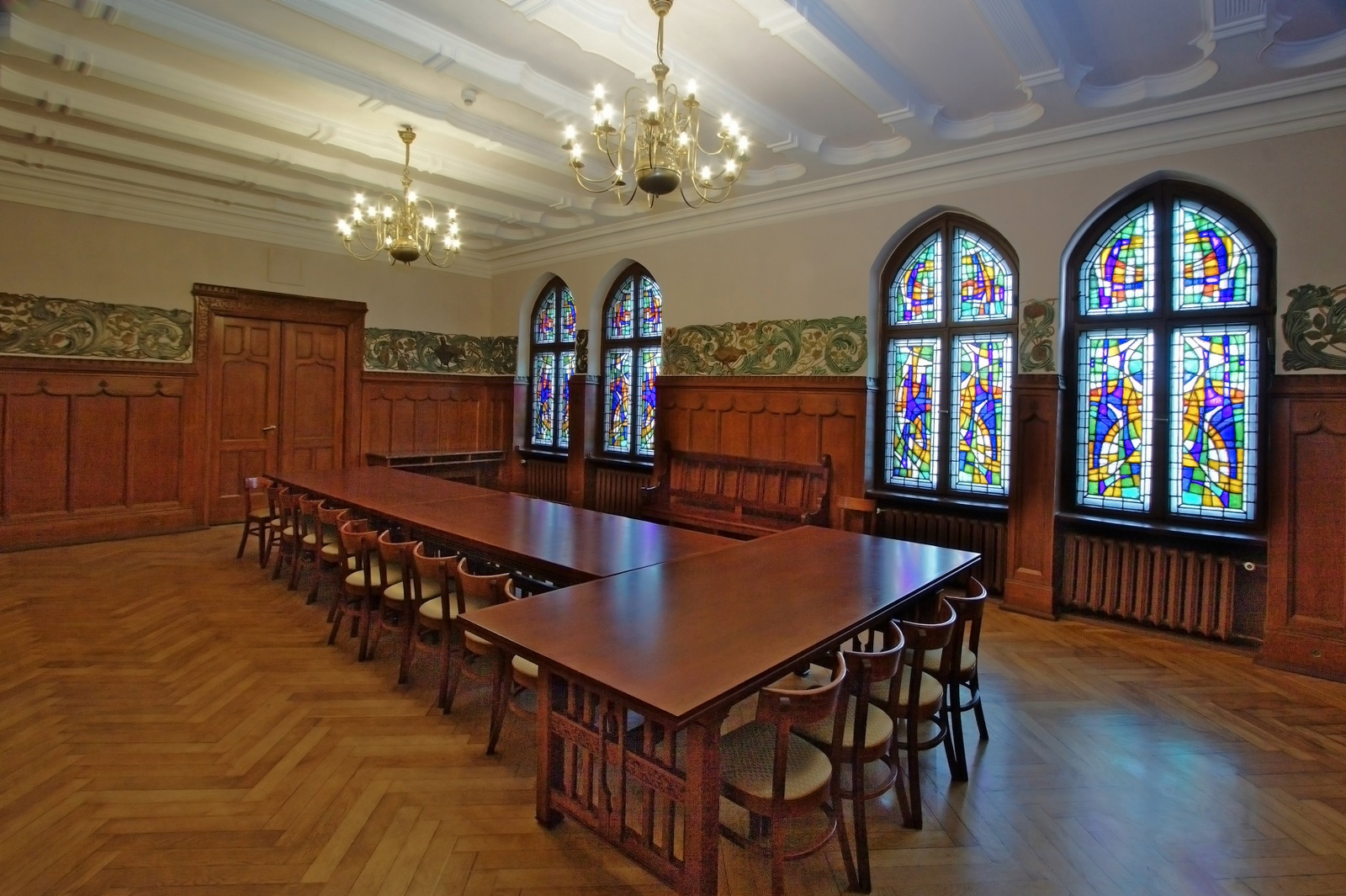
Conference room 212

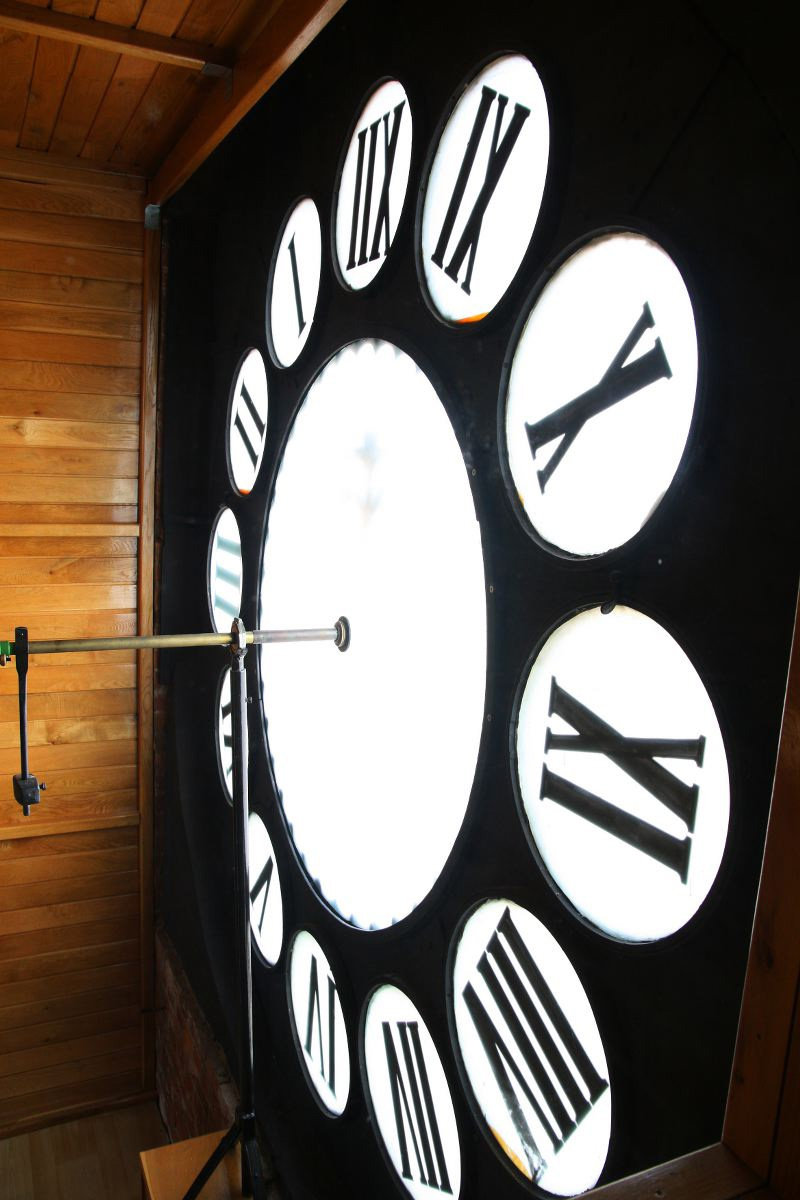
Clock

The town hall's most unique interior space is the mayor or president’s office which has twelve walls and is decorated with original furniture and an exceptional tapestry. In the second mayor's office, there is a painting by Friedrich Klein-Chevalier that depicts hunting for salmon. Some rooms feature original Art Nouveau details. The conference room has a hidden door that leads to a space that fits a small man. The building also has hidden passages and tunnels.

The five-story brick building's main façade features the crests of Pomeranian cities. The building's clock tower is 56 metres (184 ft) tall and has 180 steps that lead to a sightseeing terrace with panoramic views of the city and the river Słupia. Otto Pila, a resident of Słupsk, constructed its clock that has worked continuously since 1901. The clockwork's load is 36 kilograms (79 lb) and is slow by just two seconds each day.

Added in 1973, clock chimes play one phrase of Karol Szymanowski's IV Symphony. In 1998, Słupsk resident Jacek Stańczyk composed town's bugle call. Every day at midday, a recording of the bugle call plays from the town hall's tower. Musicians from the Polish Philharmonic Sinfonia Baltica recorded the song.

== Exhibitions ==
The town hall has several exhibits that are open to the public. In the lobby, murals depict the generous patrons of the building. On the first floor, displays include a figurine of the Słupsk Lucky Bear and the Key to United Europe for Słupsk. The Key is a symbol of Polish accession to the European Union and was presented to the town on 12 May 2004 by European Commissioner Danuta Huebner.

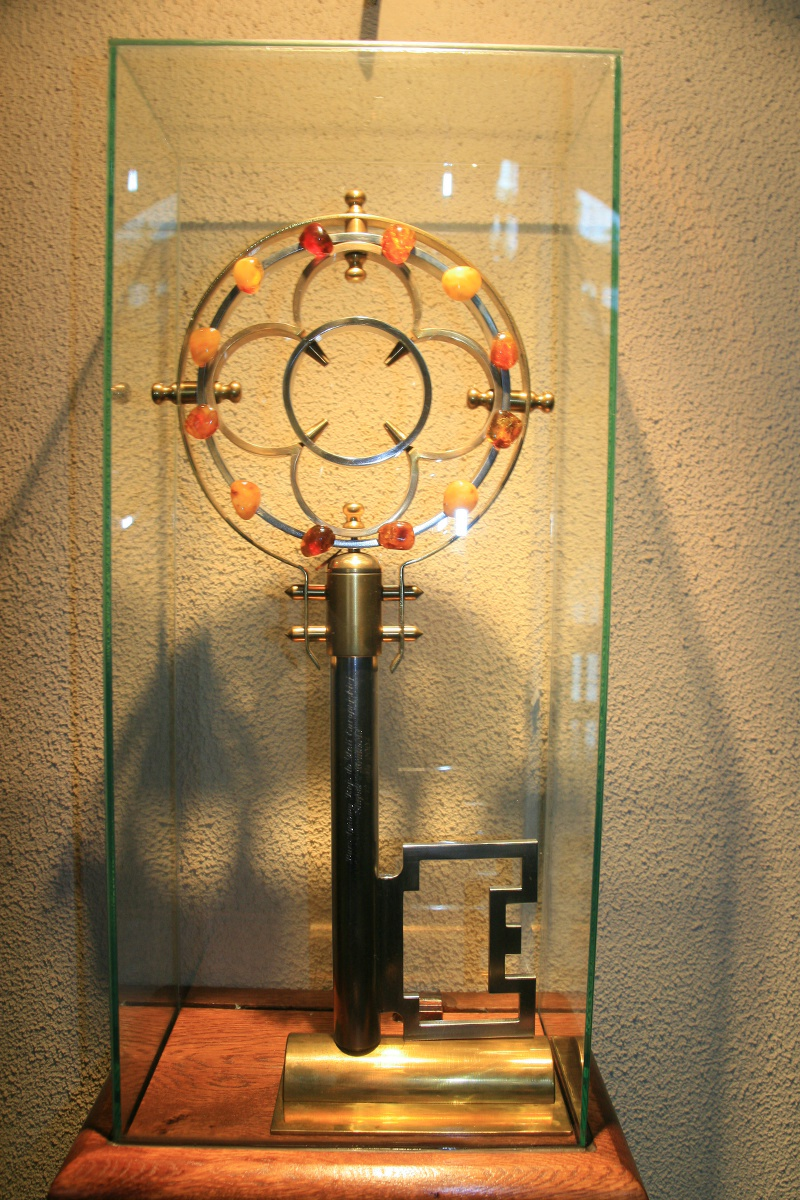
Key to United Europe

The Polish Eagle's exhibit shows the development of the Polish Coat of Arms from the 10th-century to modern times. The exhibit includes handwork borrowed from the Police School in Słupsk and reproductions of original coats of arms of royal princes, military awards, standards, seals, and coins made by a well-known Słupsk metal artist.

The tower and its sightseeing terrace have been open to visitors since 2003. Along its stairway are photographs of Słupsk and its residents before World War II. The tower features portraits of Słupsk's mayors and presidents.
