= 1910 in architecture =

The year 1910 in architecture involved some significant architectural events and new buildings.

== Events ==
- January 21 – Architect Adolf Loos delivers the lecture Ornament and Crime in Vienna.
- April 27 – Futurist poet Filippo Tommaso Marinetti issues the manifesto Contro Venezia passatista ("Against Past-loving Venice") in the Piazza San Marco.
- Mary Colter is appointed full-time architect for the Fred Harvey Company in the United States.

== Buildings and structures ==
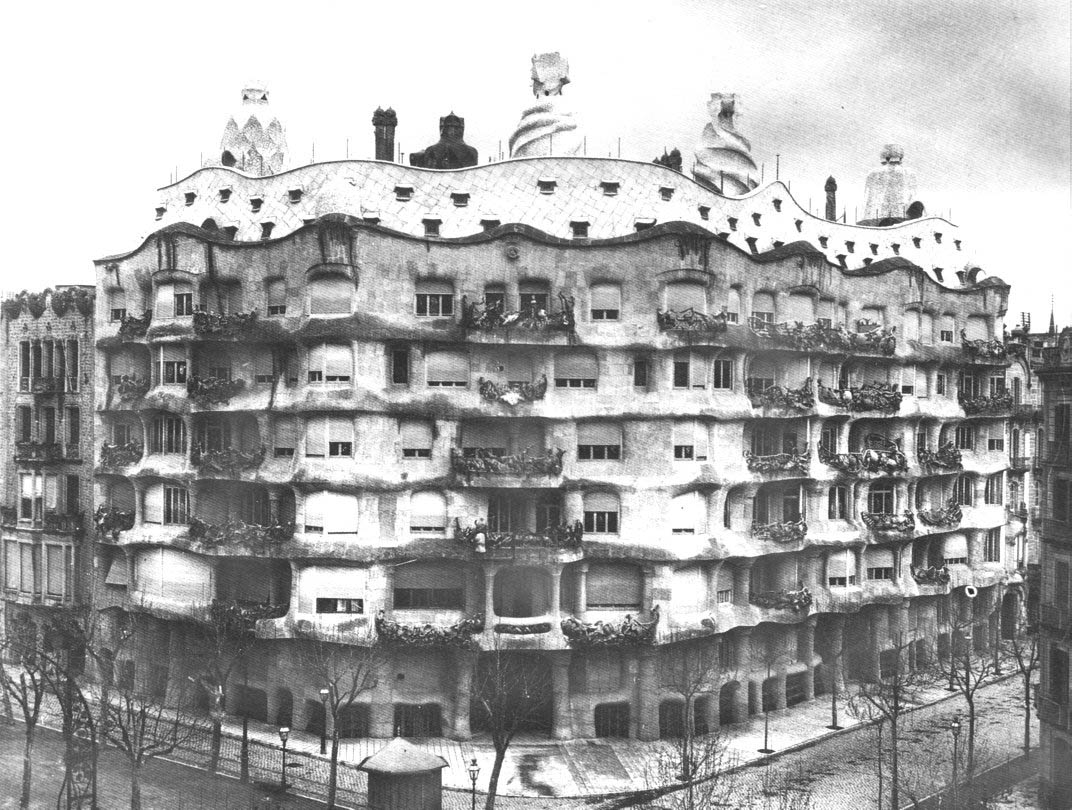
Casa Milà in Barcelona, Spain

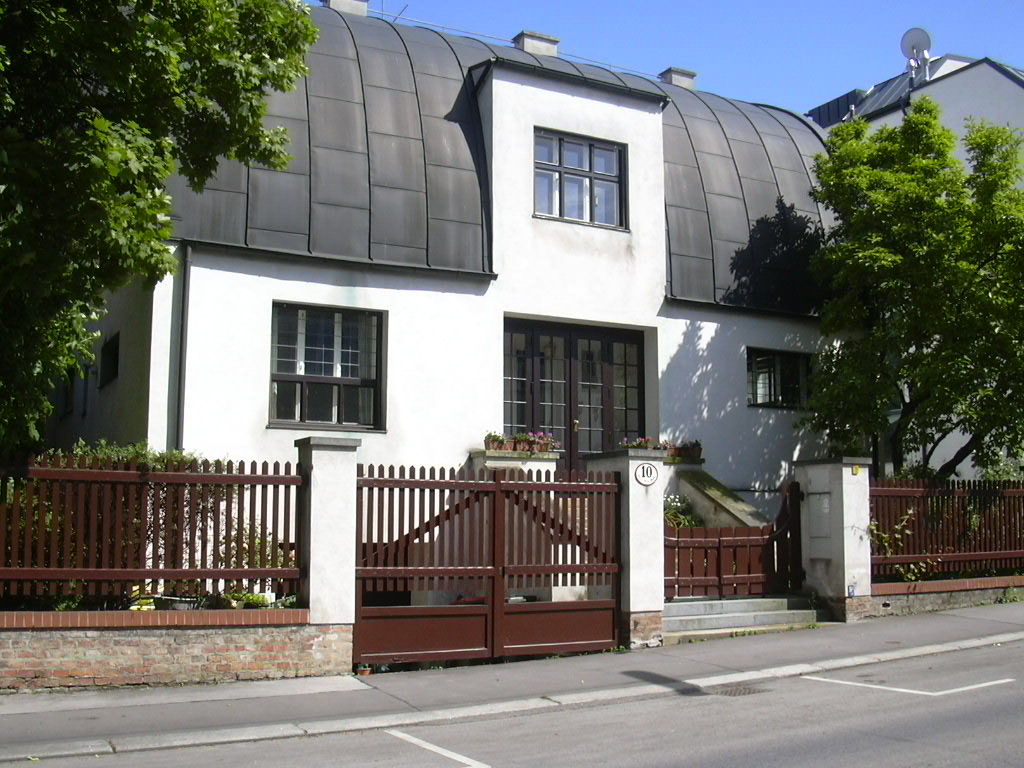
Steiner House, completed in 1910

=== Buildings opened ===
- January 22 – Flinders Street railway station in Melbourne, Australia, designed by Fawcett and Ashworth.
- February – Birmingham Oratory in Birmingham, England, designed by Edward Doran Webb.
- May 11 – Pan American Union Building, Washington, D.C., designed by Paul Philippe Cret and Albert Kelsey.
- June – Abdulla Shaig Puppet Theatre in Baku, Azerbaijan.
- July 31 – Split Rock Lighthouse, Minnesota, designed by Ralph Russell Tinkham.
- August 5 – Pilgrim Monument, Boston, Massachusetts, designed by Willard T. Sears.
- November 27 – Pennsylvania Station (New York City), designed by McKim, Mead and White.

=== Buildings completed ===
- The Renauld Bank in Nancy, designed by Émile André and Paul Charbonnier.
- The Ducret Apartment Building in Nancy, designed by André and Charbonnier.
- Casa Milà in Barcelona, designed by Antoni Gaudí.
- Goldman & Salatsch Building (the "Looshaus"), Michaelerplatz, Vienna, designed by Adolf Loos.
- Steiner House in Vienna, designed by Adolf Loos.
- Jacir Palace Hotel in Bethlehem.
- Gereonshaus in Cologne, designed by Carl Moritz.
- National Museum of Finland, Helsinki, designed by Herman Gesellius, Armas Lindgren and Eliel Saarinen.
- Liberty Tower (Manhattan) in New York, designed by Henry Ives Cobb.
- Giesshübel warehouse in Zürich, Switzerland, designed by Robert Maillart.
- St John the Baptist Cathedral, Norwich, England, to the 1882 design of George Gilbert Scott Jr.

== Awards ==
- RIBA Royal Gold Medal – Thomas Graham Jackson.
- Grand Prix de Rome, architecture: Fernand Janin.

== Births ==
- May 23 – Sir Hugh Casson, British architect, interior designer, artist, influential writer and broadcaster (died 1999)
- June 26 – Maciej Nowicki, Polish architect, chief architect of the new Indian city of Chandigarh (died 1950)
- July 2 – Richard Sheppard, English architect specializing in educational buildings (died 1982)
- August 7 – Lucien Hervé, Hungarian-born architectural photographer (died 2007)
- August 12 – Eliot Noyes, American architect and industrial designer (died 1977)
- August 20 – Eero Saarinen, Finnish American architect and industrial designer (died 1961), son of Eliel Saarinen

== Deaths ==
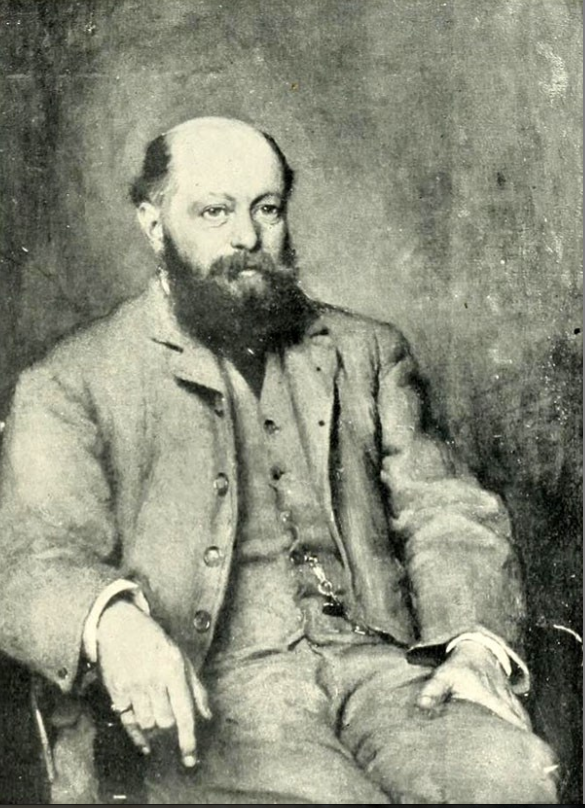
Sir Thomas Drew, died 13 March 1910

- March 13 – Sir Thomas Drew, Irish architect (born 1838)
- May 14 – Gaetano Koch, Italian architect active in Rome (born 1849)
- August 24 – Juste Lisch, French architect (born 1828)
