= 1988 in architecture =

The year 1988 in architecture involved some significant architectural events and new buildings.

== Events ==
- Hawkins\Brown architectural practice established in London.

== Buildings and structures ==
=== Buildings opened ===
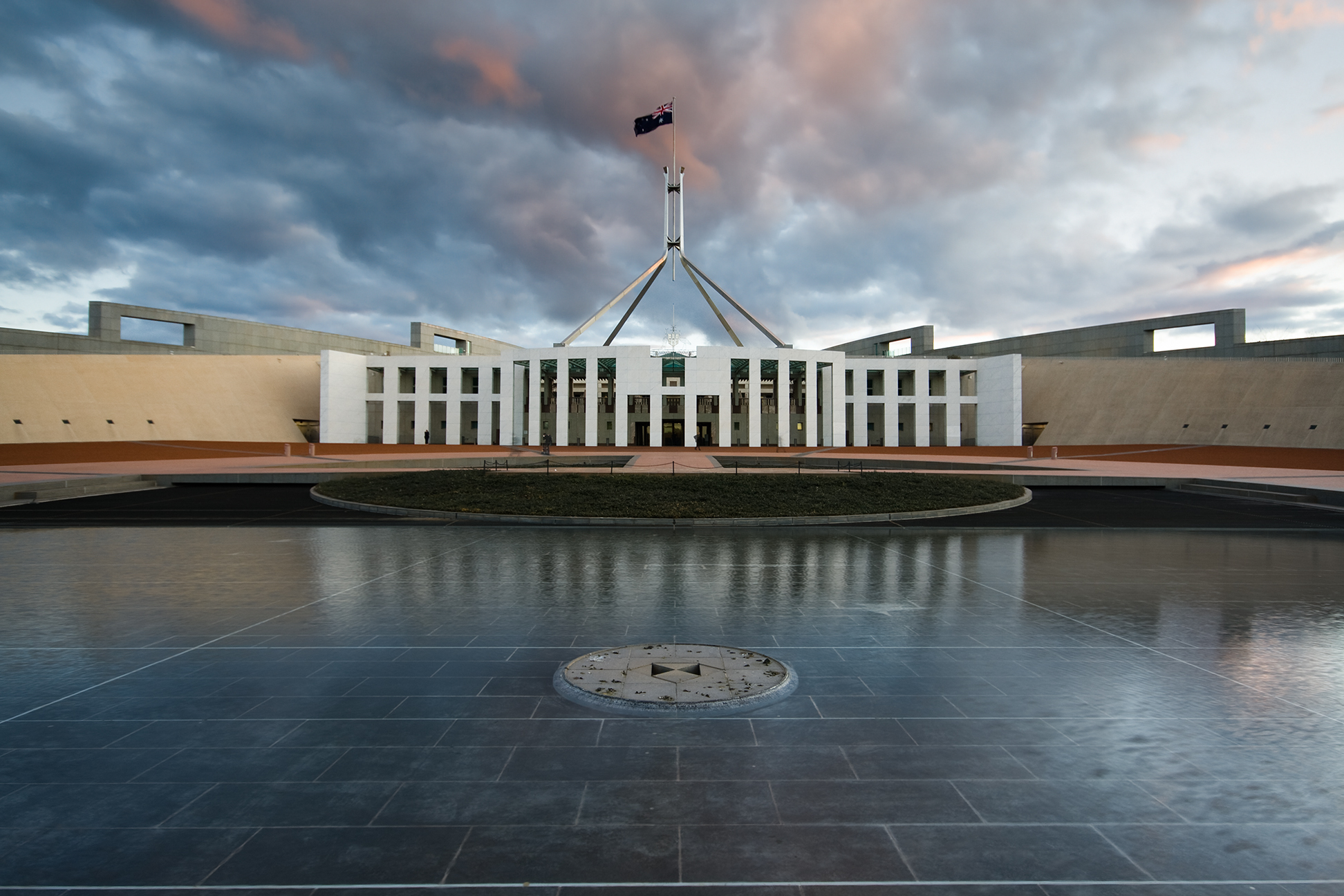
The Parliament House, Canberra, Australia

- March 13 – Seikan Tunnel beneath the Tsugaru Strait in Japan.
- May 9 – Parliament House, Canberra, Australia.
- September 25 – Aalto Theatre, Essen, Germany.
- October 10 – Cairo Opera House, Egypt.
- November 2 – Immaculate Conception Cathedral, Dili, Indonesia.
- December – Torre Picasso, in Madrid, Spain, by Minoru Yamasaki.
- date unknown – National Union of Mineworkers headquarters, Sheffield, England.

=== Buildings completed ===
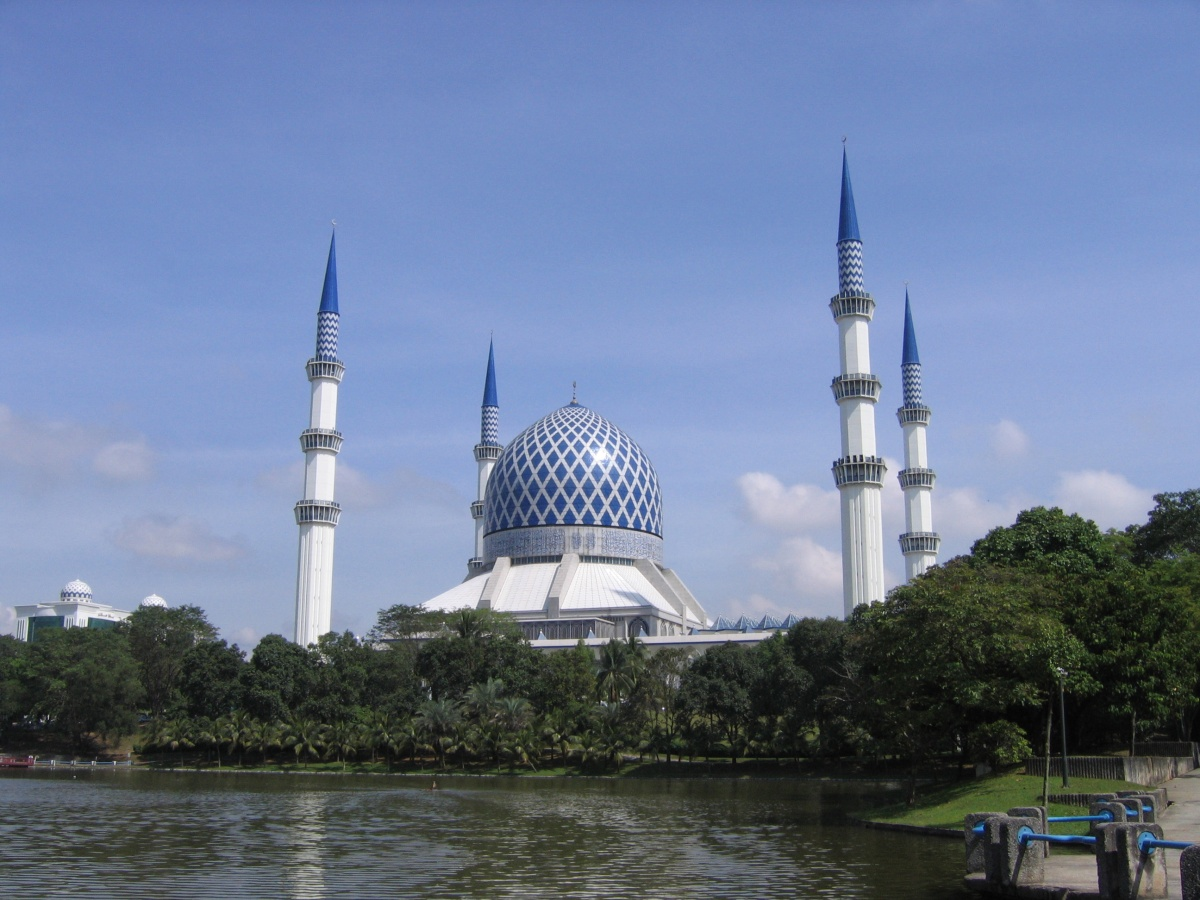
Sultan Salahuddin Abdul Aziz Mosque, Selangor, Malaysia

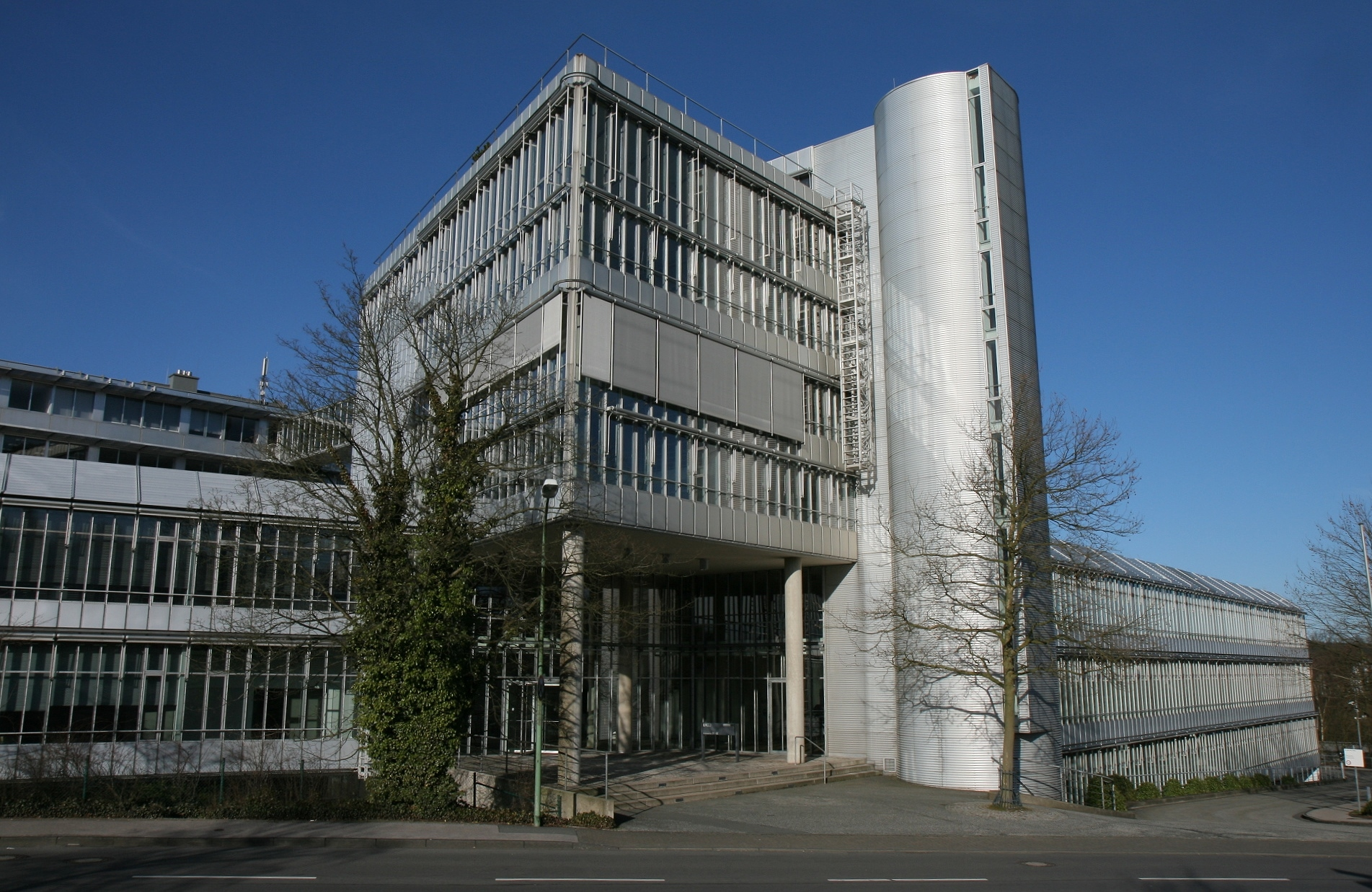
Technisches Zentrum ERCO-Leuchten in Lüdenscheid, Germany

- March 11 – Sultan Salahuddin Abdul Aziz Mosque, Selangor, Malaysia.
- July – 108 St Georges Terrace in Perth, Western Australia.
- Scotia Plaza in Toronto, Ontario, Canada.
- Bell Media Tower in Montreal, Canada.
- Canterra Tower in Calgary, Alberta.
- Wells Fargo Center in Minneapolis, Minnesota, United States.
- Pitampura TV Tower in New Delhi, India.
- Washington Mutual Tower in Seattle, Washington.
- Central Plaza 1, Brisbane, Queensland, Australia.
- One Kansas City Place, in Kansas City, Missouri, U.S.
- Bellevue Place, Hong Kong, designed by Rocco Design Architects.
- Richmond Riverside development in London, England, designed by Quinlan Terry.
- ERCO Technical Centre (Technisches Zentrum ERCO-Leuchten) in Lüdenscheid, Germany, designed by Uwe Kiessler.
- Storm water pumping station on the Isle of Dogs in London, designed by John Outram Associates.
- Causewayside Building, National Library of Scotland, Edinburgh, designed by Andrew Merrylees.
- Clovelly Visitor Centre in North Devon, England, designed by van Heyningen and Haward Architects.
- House for Janet Street-Porter, Clerkenwell, London, designed by Piers Gough of CZWG.

== Awards ==
- Alvar Aalto Medal – Alvaro Siza
- Architecture Firm Award – Hartman-Cox Architects
- European Union Prize for Contemporary Architecture (Mies van der Rohe Prize) – Alvaro Siza for Banco Borges e Irmão, Vila do Conde
- Pritzker Prize – Oscar Niemeyer and Gordon Bunshaft
- RAIA Gold Medal – Romaldo Giurgola
- RIBA Royal Gold Medal – Richard Meier
- Thomas Jefferson Medal in Architecture – Romaldo Giurgola.
- Twenty-five Year Award – Washington Dulles International Airport Terminal Building

== Deaths ==
- March – Tom Ellis, English architect (born 1911)
- March 12 – Bernard Rudofsky, Moravian-born American writer, architect, collector, teacher, designer, and social historian (born 1905)
- August 21 – Ray Eames, American architect and designer, partner of Charles Eames (born 1912)
- November 22 – Luis Barragán, Mexican architect (born 1902)
