= 1902 in architecture =

The year 1902 in architecture involved some significant events.

== Events ==
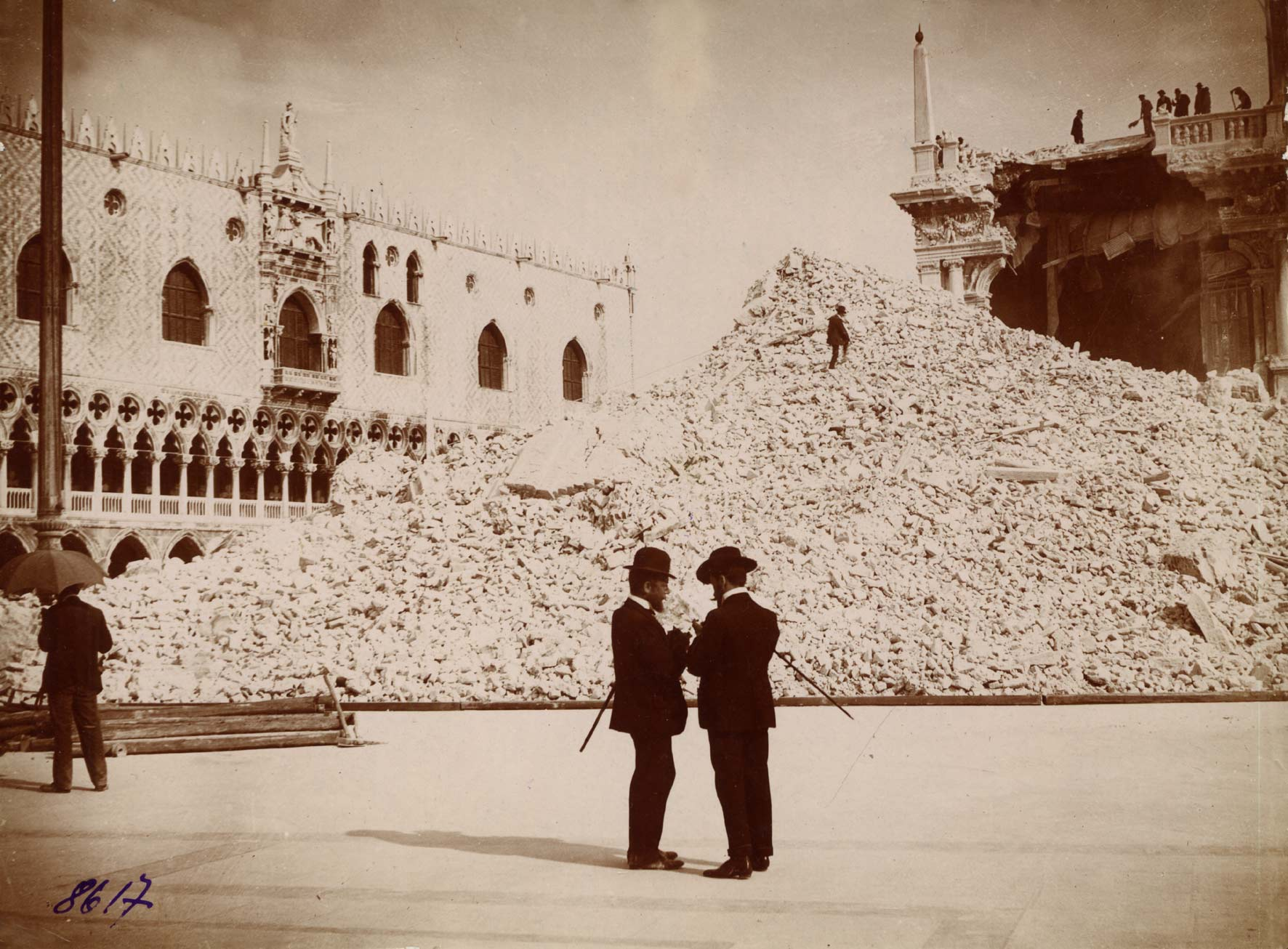
Ruins of the campanile in St Mark's Square

- July 14 – St Mark's Campanile in Venice collapses. The only casualty is a cat.
- December 13 – St. Joseph's Catholic Church in Krebs, Oklahoma, United States is destroyed by fire.
- date unknown
  - Work begins on Trmal's Villa in Prague, designed by Jan Kotěra.
  - Work begins on the Lalgarh Palace complex, in Rajasthan, India, commissioned by the British-controlled regency for Maharaja Ganga Singh (1881–1942) while he is still in his minority as they consider the existing Junagarh Palace unsuitable for a modern monarch. Ganga Singh decides that the palace should be named in memory of his father Maharaja Lall Singh.
  - The Villa Lejeune and the France-Lanord and Lombard Apartment Buildings in Nancy are designed by Émile André.

== Buildings and structures ==
=== Buildings opened ===
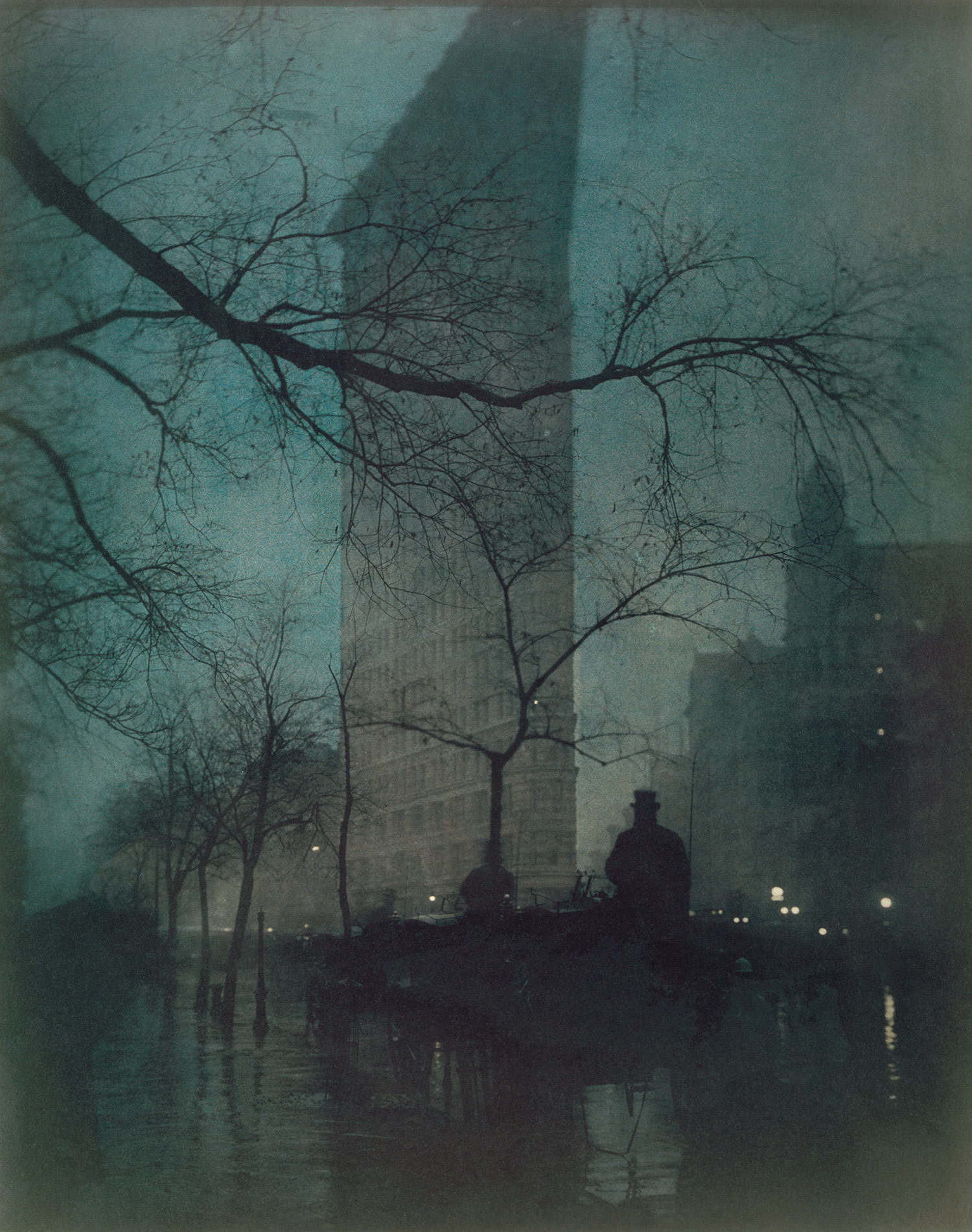
Flatiron Building, photographed by Edward Steichen

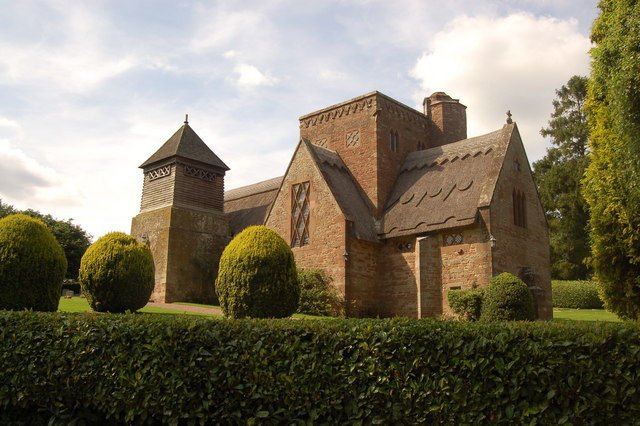
All Saints' Church, Brockhampton, England

- May 26 – Nożyk Synagogue, Warsaw, Poland.
- September 15 – West Baden Springs Hotel in Indiana, designed by Harrison Albright featuring the world's largest free-spanning dome.
- October 15 – Balmoral Hotel in Edinburgh, Scotland.

=== Buildings completed ===
- Hungarian Parliament Building in Budapest, designed by Imre Steindl.
- Flatiron Building in New York City, designed by Daniel Burnham and Frederick Dinkelberg.
- Wiener Stadtbahn railway system in Vienna, with Art Nouveau stations designed by Otto Wagner.
- Sayles Memorial Library, Pawtucket, Rhode Island, designed by Ralph Adams Cram with marble reliefs by Lee Lawrie
- Wallpaper factory for Arthur Sanderson & Sons in Chiswick, London, designed by Charles Voysey.
- The Cologne Stadttheater, designed by Carl Moritz.
- Batumi Cathedral of the Mother of God (Georgian Orthodox Church) is completed.
- All Saints' Church, Brockhampton, England, designed by William Lethaby and built by direct craftsman labour, is completed.
- The Villa Jika in Nancy for Louis Majorelle, designed by Henri Sauvage and Lucien Weissenburger, with stained glass by Jacques Grüber and ironwork and interior woodwork by Majorelle himself, is completed.
- The Biet Apartment Building in Nancy, designed by Georges Biet and Eugène Vallin
- The House with Chimaeras in Kyiv, Ukraine, designed by Vladislav Gorodetsky.
- Santa Justa Lift in Lisbon, Portugal, engineered by Raoul Mesnier du Ponsard, begins operation.
- Hotel Majestic in San Francisco, California, designed by Malcolm Cressy for Milton L. Schmitt and family.

== Awards ==
- RIBA Royal Gold Medal – Thomas Edward Collcutt.
- Grand Prix de Rome, architecture: Henri Prost.

== Births ==
- January 30 – Nikolaus Pevsner, German-born architectural historian working in England (died 1983)
- February 11 – Arne Jacobsen, Danish architect and designer (died 1971)
- February 27 – Lúcio Costa, Brazilian architect and urban planner (died 1998)
- March 9
  - Luis Barragán, Mexican architect (died 1988)
  - Edward Durrell Stone, American architect (died 1978)
- May 21 – Marcel Breuer, Hungarian-born architect and designer working in the United States (died 1981)
- July 22 – Basil Ward, New Zealand-born architect working in England (died 1976)
- August 8 – Welton Becket, American architect (died 1969)
- November 11 – Ernő Goldfinger, Hungarian-born architect working in England (died 1987)

== Deaths ==
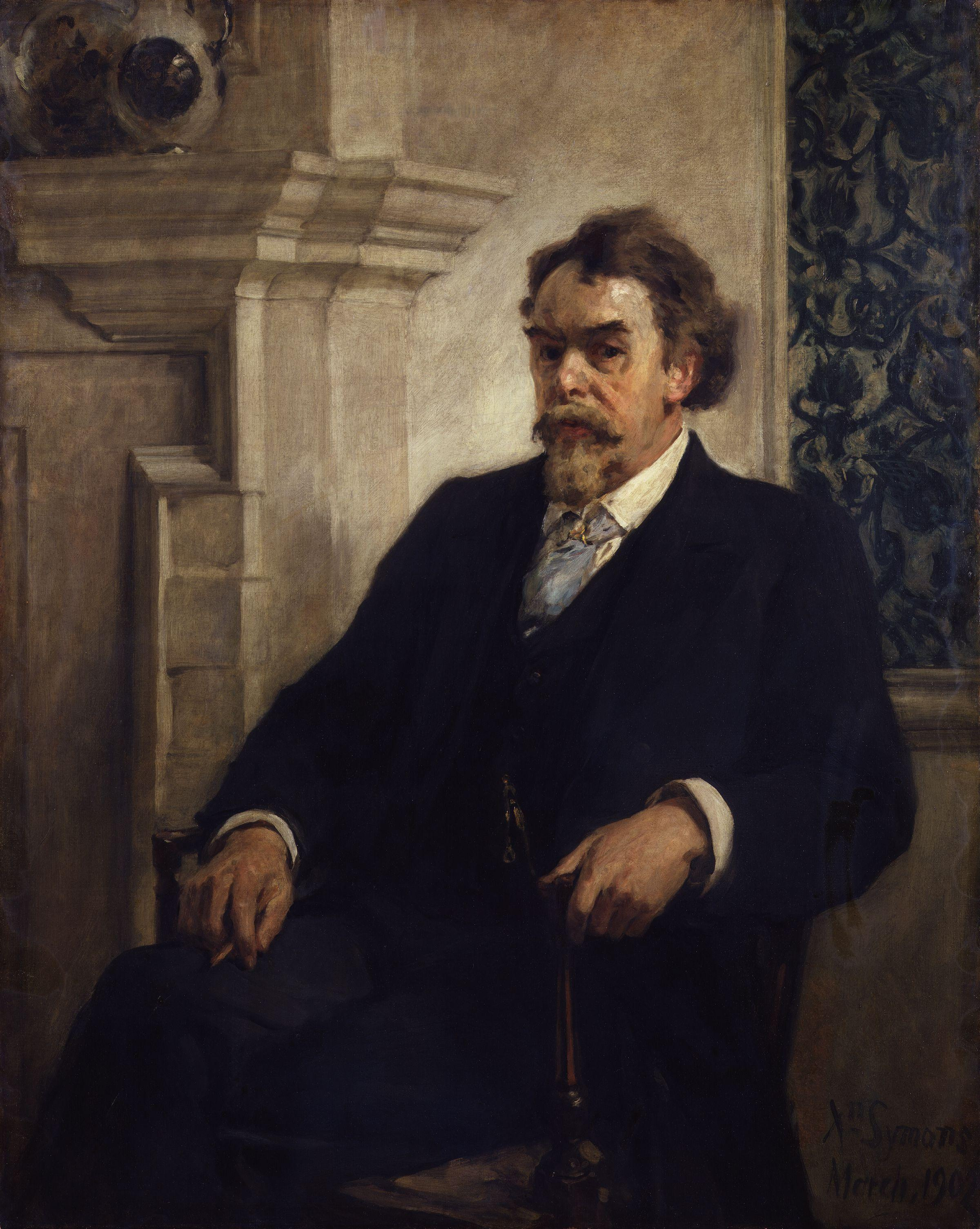
John Francis Bentley

- January 9 – István Kiss, Hungarian architect of public buildings (born 1857)
- March 2 – John Francis Bentley, English ecclesiastical architect (born 1839)
- March 28 – Conrad Wilhelm Hase, German architect and founder of the Hanover school of architecture (born 1818)
- April 11 – Johan Daniel Herholdt, Danish architect, professor and royal building inspector (born 1818)
- May – Tom Dunn, Scottish-born golf course architect (born 1849)
- June 1 – James Brown Lord, American Beaux-Arts architect (born 1859)
- August 31 – Imre Steindl, Hungarian architect (born 1839)
- December 3 – Robert Lawson, New Zealand architect (born 1833)
- date unknown – Alexandru Săvulescu, Romanian architect (born 1847)
