= 1907 in architecture =

The year 1907 in architecture involved some significant architectural events and new buildings.

== Events ==
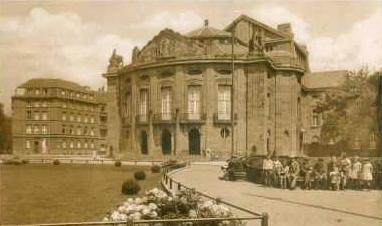
Stadttheater Düren

- January – Plans for St David's Hotel, a hotel for golfers at Harlech, Gwynedd, Wales, are drawn up by the Glasgow School architect George Walton for a syndicate of entrepreneurs of which he is a member. The hotel closes in 2008, and planning permission for demolition is approved in 2009.
- May 18 – The foundation stone of Bedford School chapel in England, designed by G. F. Bodley, is laid.
- September 29 – The foundation stone of Washington National Cathedral in Washington, D.C., designed by G. F. Bodley, is laid.
- October 6 – Deutscher Werkbund is founded by Hermann Muthesius in Munich.
- City plan for Barcelona by Léon Jaussely officially adopted.
- District plan for Highland Park, Texas, by Wilbur David Cook and George Kessler drawn up.
- English designer C. R. Ashbee is commissioned to build the Villa San Giorgio in Taormina, Sicily.

== Buildings and structures ==
=== Buildings completed ===
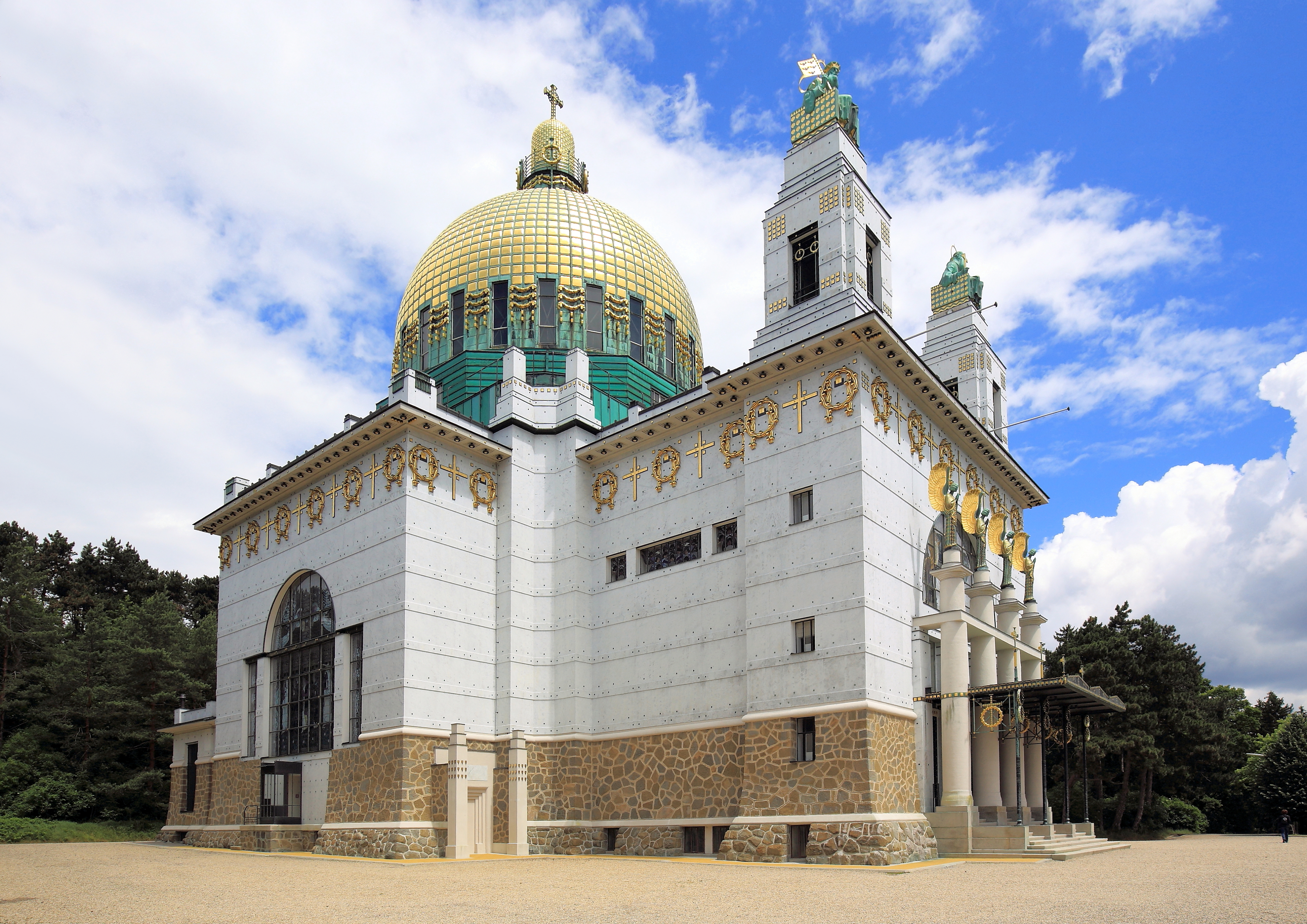
Kirche am Steinhof in Vienna, Austria

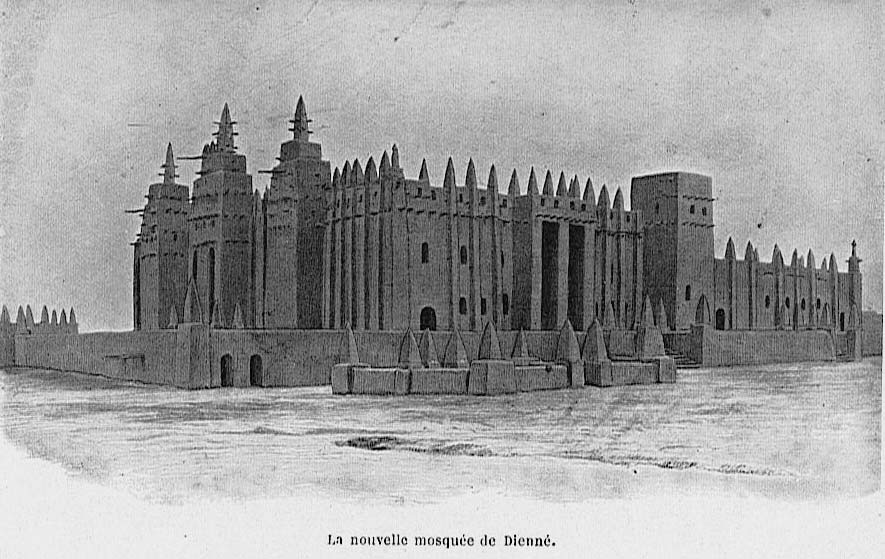
Great Mosque of Djenné in French Sudan

- April 13 – Old New York Evening Post Building at 20 Vesey Street on Manhattan, designed in Art Nouveau style by Robert D. Kohn, opened.
- October 8 – Kirche am Steinhof in Vienna, designed by Otto Wagner.
- Great Mosque of Djenné in French Sudan.
- Port of Liverpool Building in Liverpool, England, designed by Sir Arnold Thornely.
- Tampere Cathedral, Finland, designed by Lars Sonck.
- Poti Cathedral in Georgia within the Russian Empire, designed by Alexander Zelenko and Robert Marfeld and constructed on the Hennebique system.
- St Matthew's Church, Paisley in Scotland, designed by W. D. McLennan.
- St. Joseph's Catholic Church (Krebs, Oklahoma).
- Rebuilt Sainte-Madeleine, Strasbourg, in Alsace-Lorraine, designed by Fritz Beblo.
- The Magasins Réunis, a large department store in Nancy, France, by Lucien Weissenburger (after seventeen years of work).
- Villa Fruhinsholz in Nancy, France, designed by Léon Cayotte.
- Stadttheater Barmen in Wuppertal and Stadttheater Düren, both designed by Carl Moritz in Germany.
- North Hall, the fifth dormitory on the quad at Vassar College, USA. The building is renamed Jewett Hall in 1912 in honor of the College's first president, Milo P. Jewett.
- Rebuilt Basel SBB railway station in Switzerland, designed by Emil Faesch and Emmanuel La Roche.

== Awards ==
- AIA Gold Medal – Aston Webb.
- RIBA Royal Gold Medal – John Belcher.

== Births ==
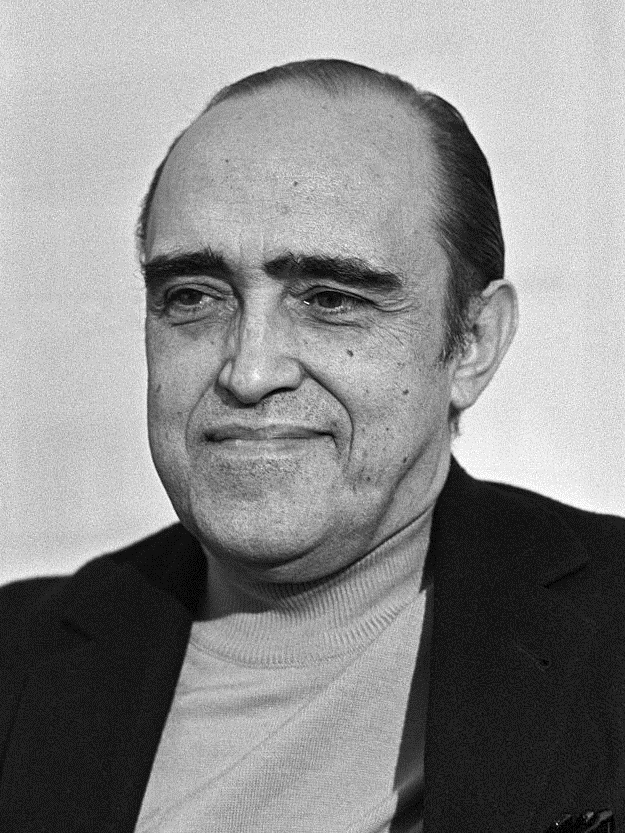
Oscar Niemeyer

- June 17 – Charles Eames, American designer (died 1978)
- July 7 – Ben-Ami Shulman, Israeli architect (died 1986)
- August 13
  - J. M. Richards, English architectural writer (died 1992)
  - Basil Spence, Indian-born British architect (died 1976)
- August 24 – Bruno Giacometti, Swiss architect (died 2012)
- December 15 – Oscar Niemeyer, Brazilian architect (died 2012)
- Walter Segal, German-born architect, pioneer of self-build methods (died 1985)

== Deaths ==
- January 24 – Vilhelm Dahlerup, Danish historicist architect (born 1826)
- May 6 – Emanuele Luigi Galizia, Maltese architect and civil engineer (born 1830)
- June 14 – William Le Baron Jenney, American architect credited with building the first skyscraper (born 1832)
- October 21 – George Frederick Bodley, English architect (born 1827)
- November 30 – Ludwig Levy, German Jewish historicist architect (born 1854)
