= 1894 in architecture =

The year 1894 in architecture involved some significant events.

== Events ==
- In the United States, the Society of Beaux-Arts Architects is founded.
- Anatole de Baudot designs the church of Saint-Jean-de-Montmartre in Paris as the first to use a reinforced concrete frame.

== Buildings and structures ==
=== Buildings opened ===
The Tower Bridge in London

- April 21 – Quatro de Setembro Theater, Teresina, Brazil.
- May 14 – Blackpool Tower in Blackpool, England, completed to a design by Maxwell and Tuke and opened to the public.
- June 30 – Tower Bridge in London, designed by Horace Jones (architect) and John Wolfe-Barry.
- July
  - Dalen Hotel in Norway, designed by Haldor Børve.
  - Palais Galliera in Paris, designed by Léon Ginain.
- October 16 – Hessisches Staatstheater Wiesbaden, designed by Fellner & Helmer.

=== Buildings completed ===
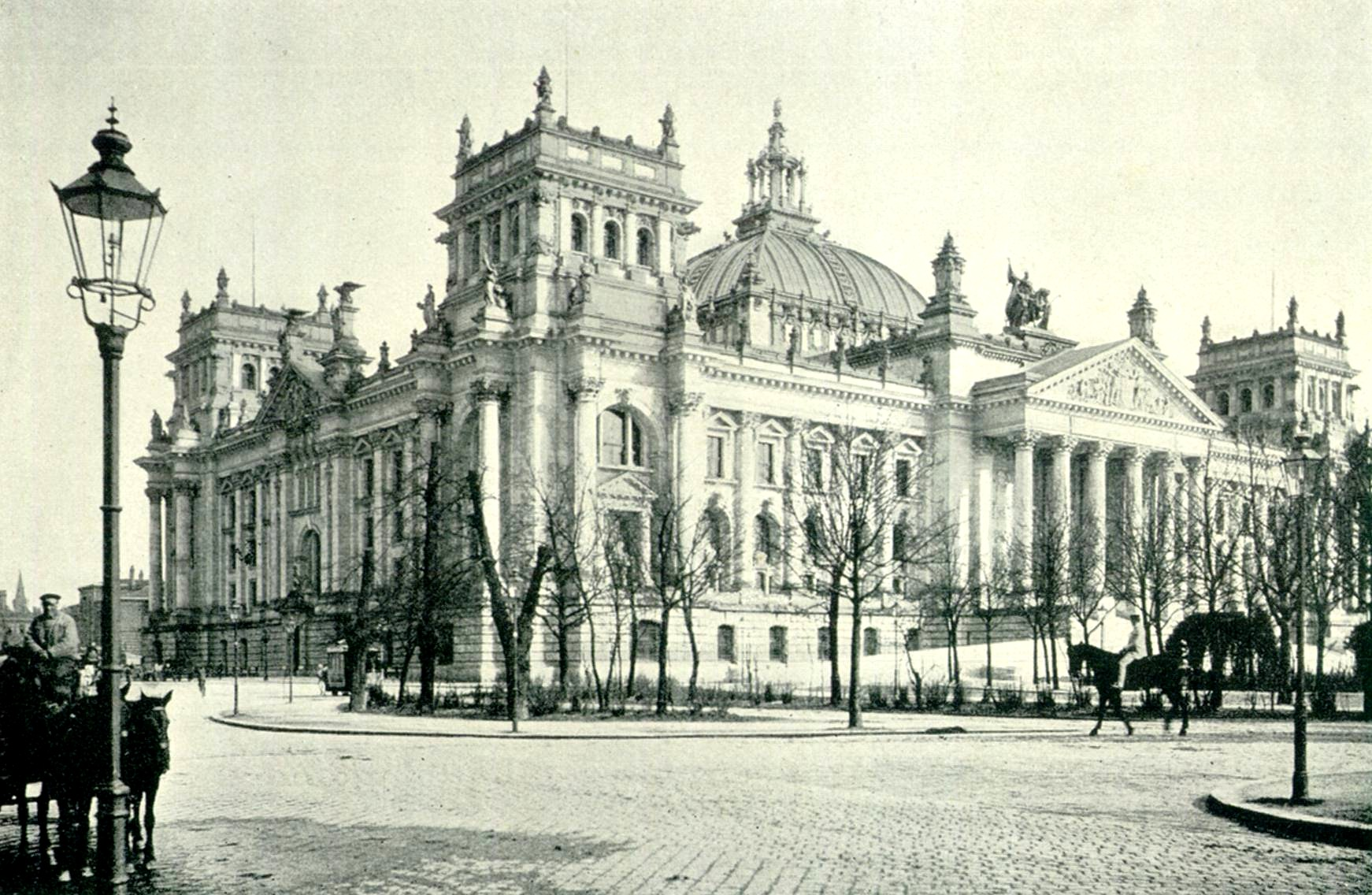
Reichstag

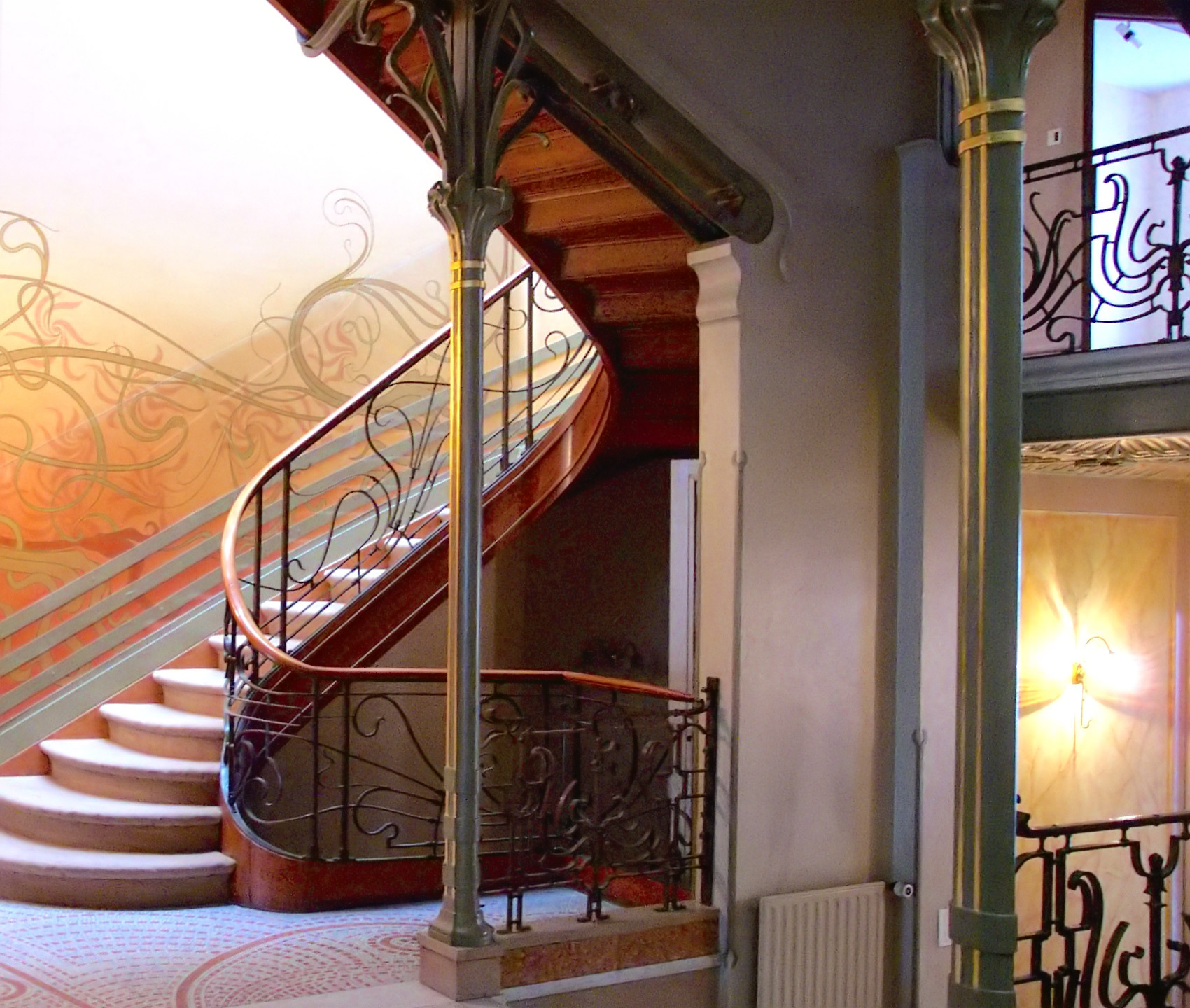
Hôtel Tassel, pioneering Art Nouveau

- Kapelle der Versöhnung, Berlin, Germany.
- Mary, Queen of the World Cathedral, Montreal, Canada.
- Reformed Church, Dresden, designed by Harald Julius von Bosse (demolished 1963).
- Ringkirche, Wiesbaden, designed by Johannes Otzen.
- Sacred Heart Church (Kőszeg, Hungary), designed by Ludwig Schöne.
- St. Peter's Church, Jaffa.
- Colegio de Santa Maria de Jesús in Barcelona, Spain, designed by Antoni Gaudí.
- Columbus Hall (school and theater) in Orange, NJ designed by Jeremiah O'Rourke.
- Antiguo Cuartel Militar Español de Ponce, Puerto Rico.
- Sisters of Charity Hospital, Zagreb, Croatia.
- Reichstag in Berlin, designed by Paul Wallot.
- Royal Museum of Fine Arts, Antwerp, designed by Jean-Jacques Winders and Frans Van Dijk.
- Guaranty Building, Buffalo, New York, designed by Louis Sullivan.
- Hôtel Tassel (town house), Brussels, designed by Victor Horta.
- Hurlbut Memorial Gate, Detroit, Michigan, USA.
- Lululaund, a house for Hubert von Herkomer at Bushey, England, based on a design by Henry Hobson Richardson (d. 1886) (demolished 1939).
- Rebuilt Köln Hauptbahnhof railway station in Cologne, Germany, designed by E. Grüttefie (engineer) and Georg Frentzen (architect).
- Negril Lighthouse, Jamaica.
- De Arend, Coevorden (smock mill), Netherlands.

== Awards ==
- RIBA Royal Gold Medal – Frederic Leighton.
- Grand Prix de Rome, architecture: Alfred-Henri Recoura.

== Births ==
- February 18 – Paul Williams, California-based architect (died 1980)

== Deaths ==
- April 11 – Constantin Lipsius, German architect and architectural theorist (born 1832)
- June 27 – Giorgio Costantino Schinas, Maltese architect and civil engineer (born 1834)
- August 15 – Arthur Rotch, Boston-based architect (born 1850)
- September 16 – Eduard Mezger, Bavarian architect, painter, professor and high civil officer of the royal buildings administration (born 1807)
- December 16 – Alexandru Orăscu, Romanian Neoclassicist architect (born 1817)
