= Karl Weißbach =

German architect and university lecturer

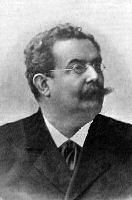
- Born: 8 April 1841; Dresden
- Died: 8 July 1905 (aged 64); Dresden

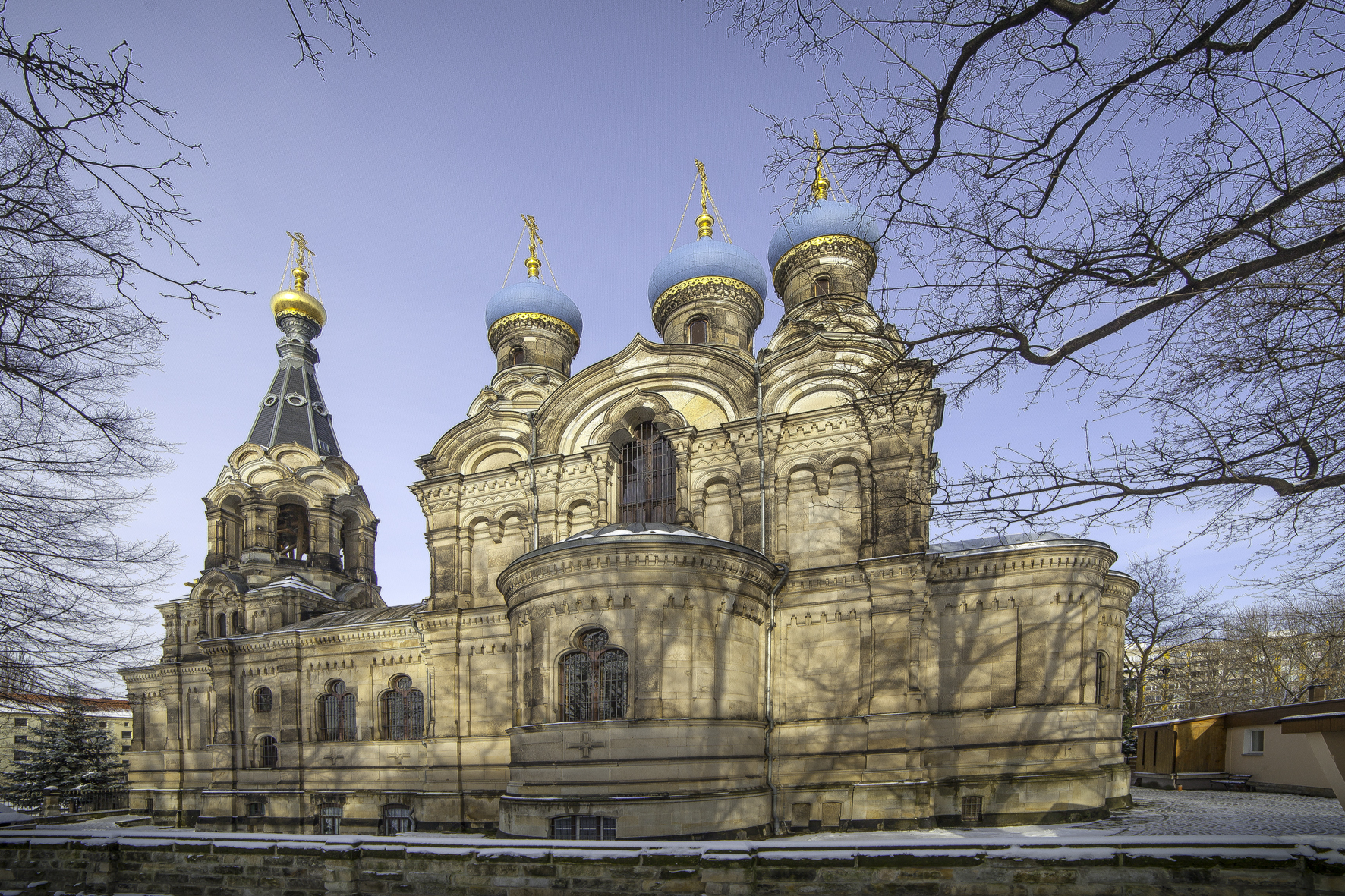
St. Simeon of the Wonderful Mountain Church; jointly designed with Harald Julius von Bosse

Johann Karl Robert Weißbach (1841–1905) was a German architect and Professor.

== Life and work ==
After graduating from secondary school, he completed an apprenticeship in the building trade, while attending the local Baugewerkschule (Building School). Following that, he spent some time working in the studios of Bernhard Krüger (1821-1881), the Court Architect. He completed his studies at the Dresden Academy of Fine Arts with Georg Hermann Nicolai. In 1863, he was awarded an academic travel grant, which he used to visit Italy and study Renaissance architecture. He was able to extend his stay there by participating in the preparation of The Buildings of the Renaissance in Tuscany, a book by Heinrich von Förster.

In 1867, he returned to Dresden and worked as a building manager for his former teacher, Nicolai, during the construction of the "Villa Meyer" (which was destroyed in World War II). After that, he became a professor at the academy, but gave up the position in 1875, when the Ministry of Culture prescribed a curriculum with which he did not agree. He then worked as a teacher in the structural engineering department at the Royal Polytechnic; the precursor of today's Dresden University of Technology (TU Dresden).

In addition to his teaching activities, and the occasional official assignment, he often worked independently. Between 1884 and 1891, he worked in association with Karl Barth, one of his former students. Many famous architects began their careers at his "private studio"; including Georg Weidenbach, Rudolf Schilling and Kurt Diestel. His official students included Oswin Hempel and, for a few months, Ernst Ludwig Kirchner.

His grave in the Alter Annenfriedhof was destroyed in 1945. His name was later placed on a memorial there, dedicated to the professors of TU Dresden.

During the construction of the Moltke Quarter in Essen (1908), a street was named after him. There is also a street that bears his name in Dresden's Südvorstadt district.

== Sources ==
- R. K.: "Karl Weißbach" (obituary), In: Deutsche Bauzeitung, #39, 1905, pp. 355–358.
- Volker Helas: Architektur in Dresden 1800–1900. 3rd ed., Verlag der Kunst, 1991, pg.200 ff. ISBN 3-364-00261-4
