= St. Simeon of the Wonderful Mountain Church =

Russian Orthodox Church in Dresden

Coordinates: 51°02′01″N 13°43′53″E

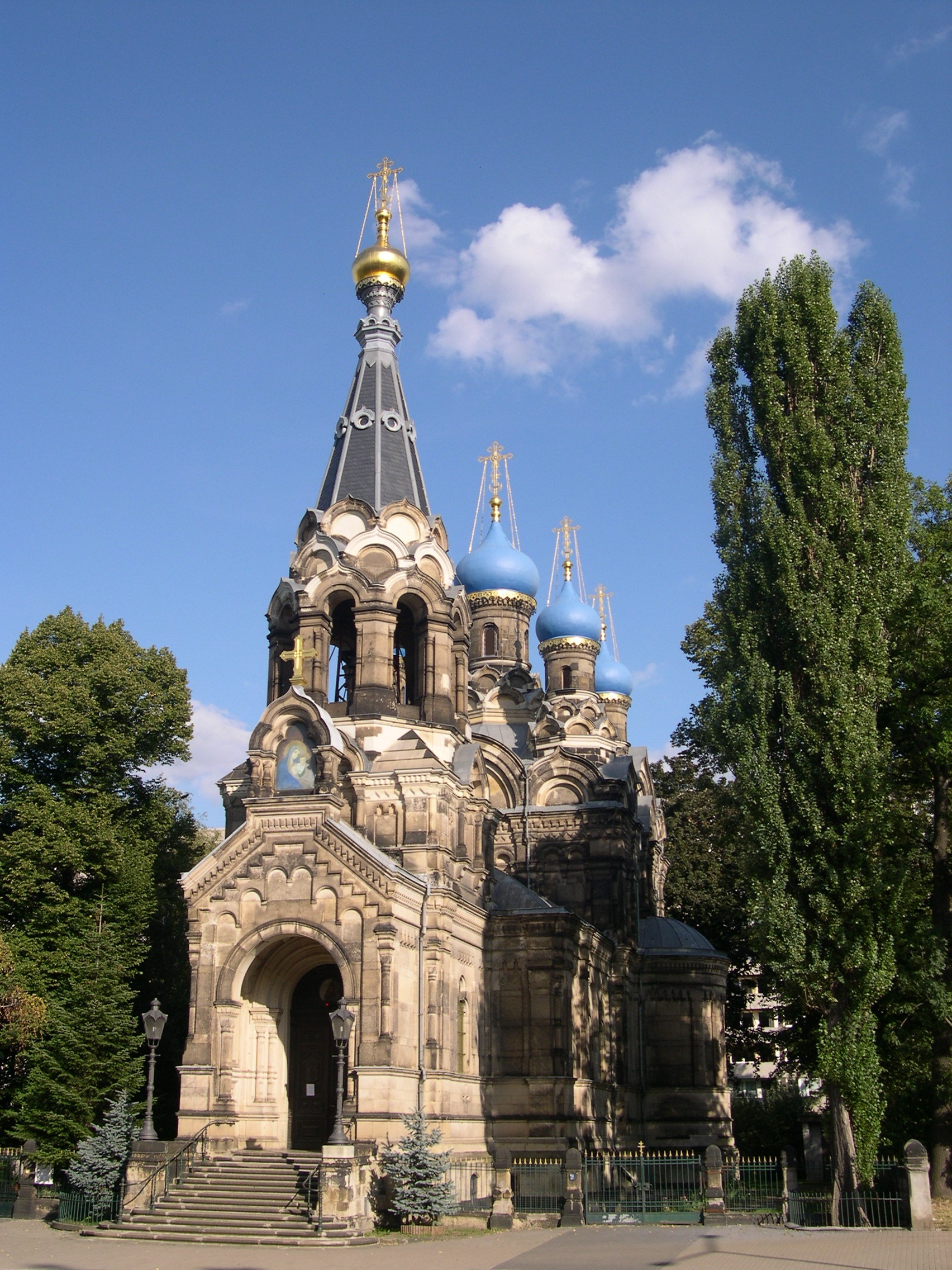
Exterior view

The St. Simeon of the Wonderful Mountain Church (Russisch-Orthodoxe Kirche des Heiligen Simeon vom wunderbaren Berge) is a Russian Orthodox church in the German city of Dresden. It was designed by Harald Julius von Bosse and Karl Weißbach and built from 1872 to 1874. It is dedicated to Simeon Stylites the Younger.

During the aerial bombing attack on the city in February 1945, the church was the only building within a wide area which remained relatively intact.

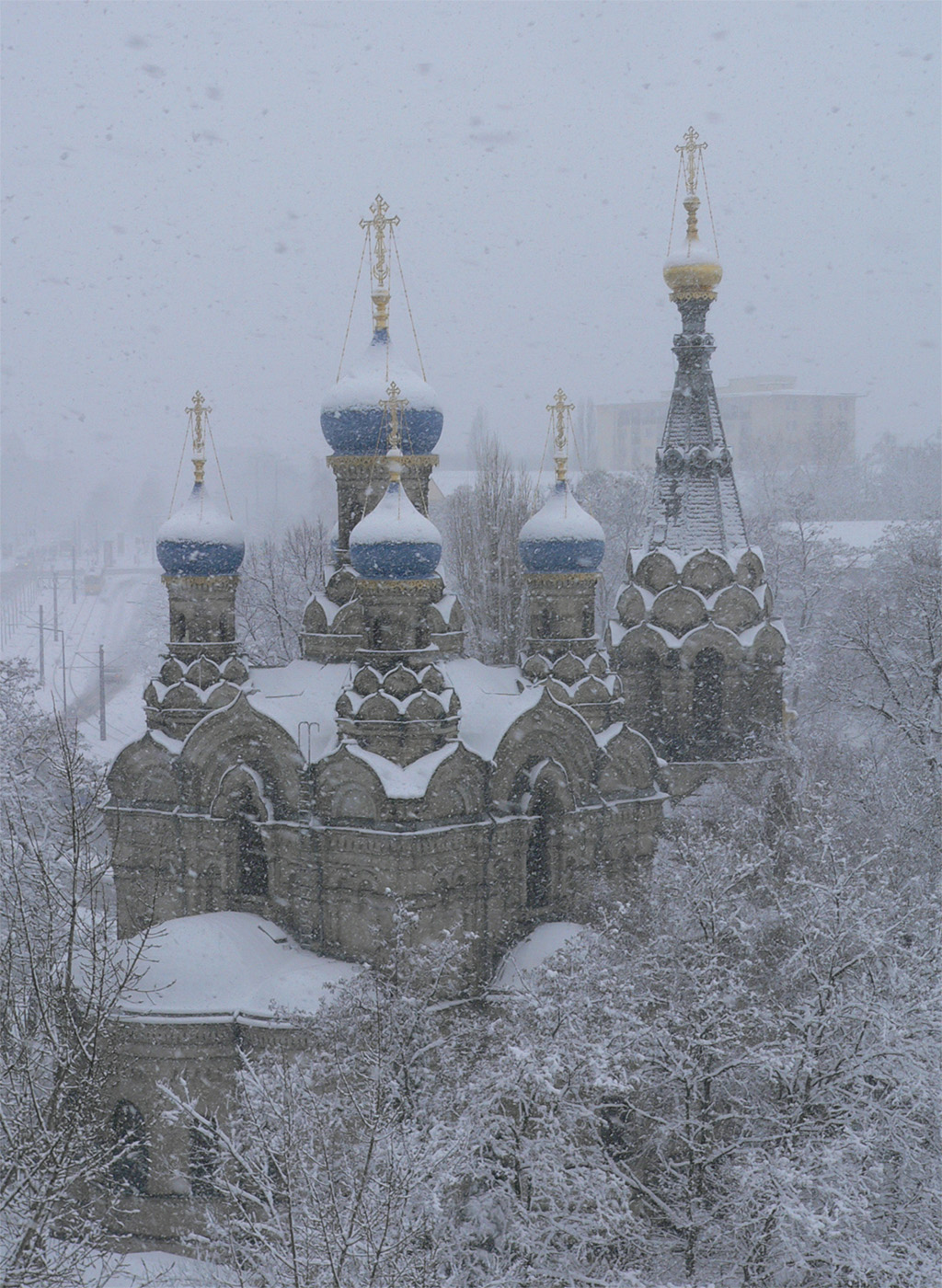
Winter view

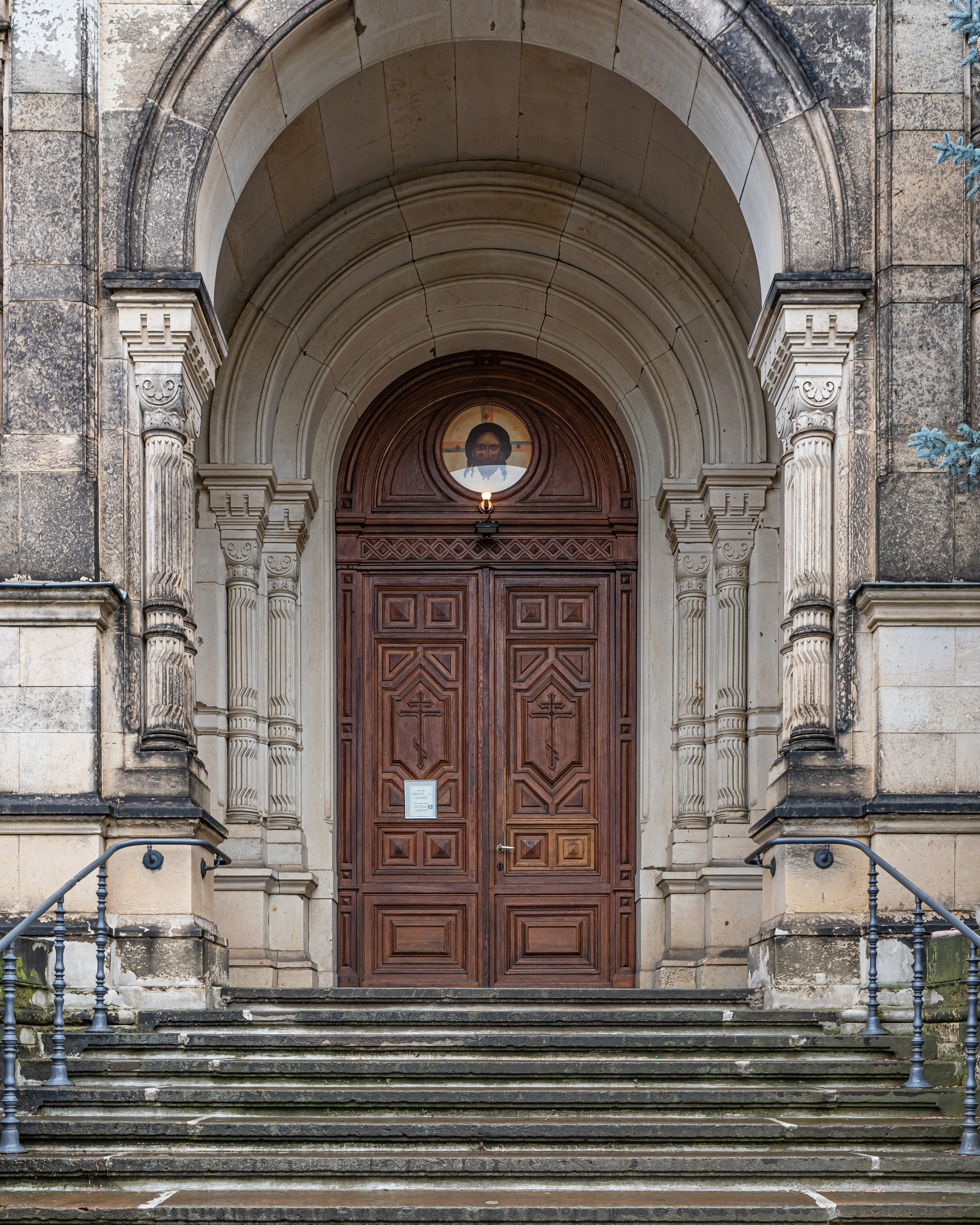
Church portal

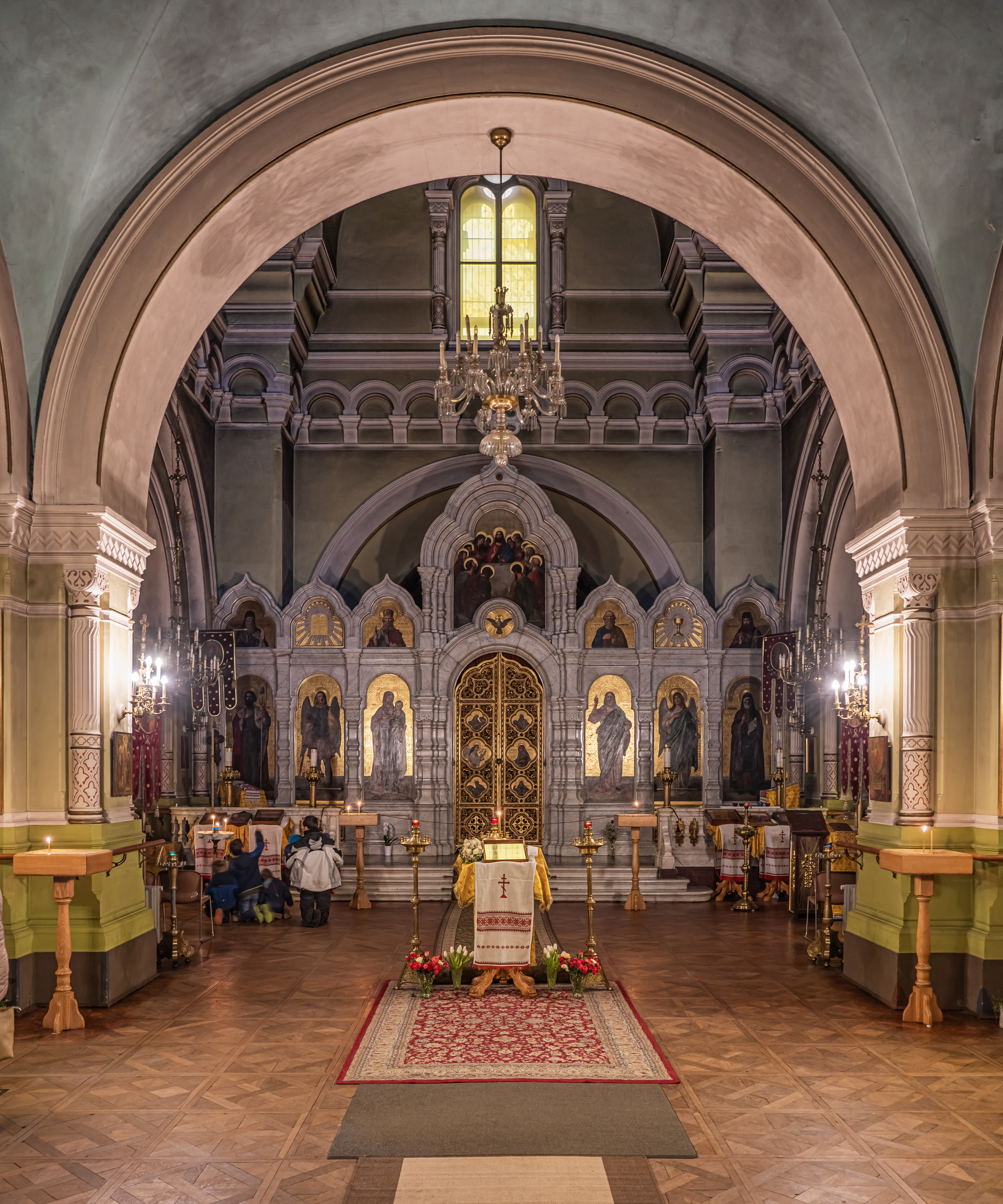
Interior view
