= Georg Weidenbach =

German architect (1853–1928)

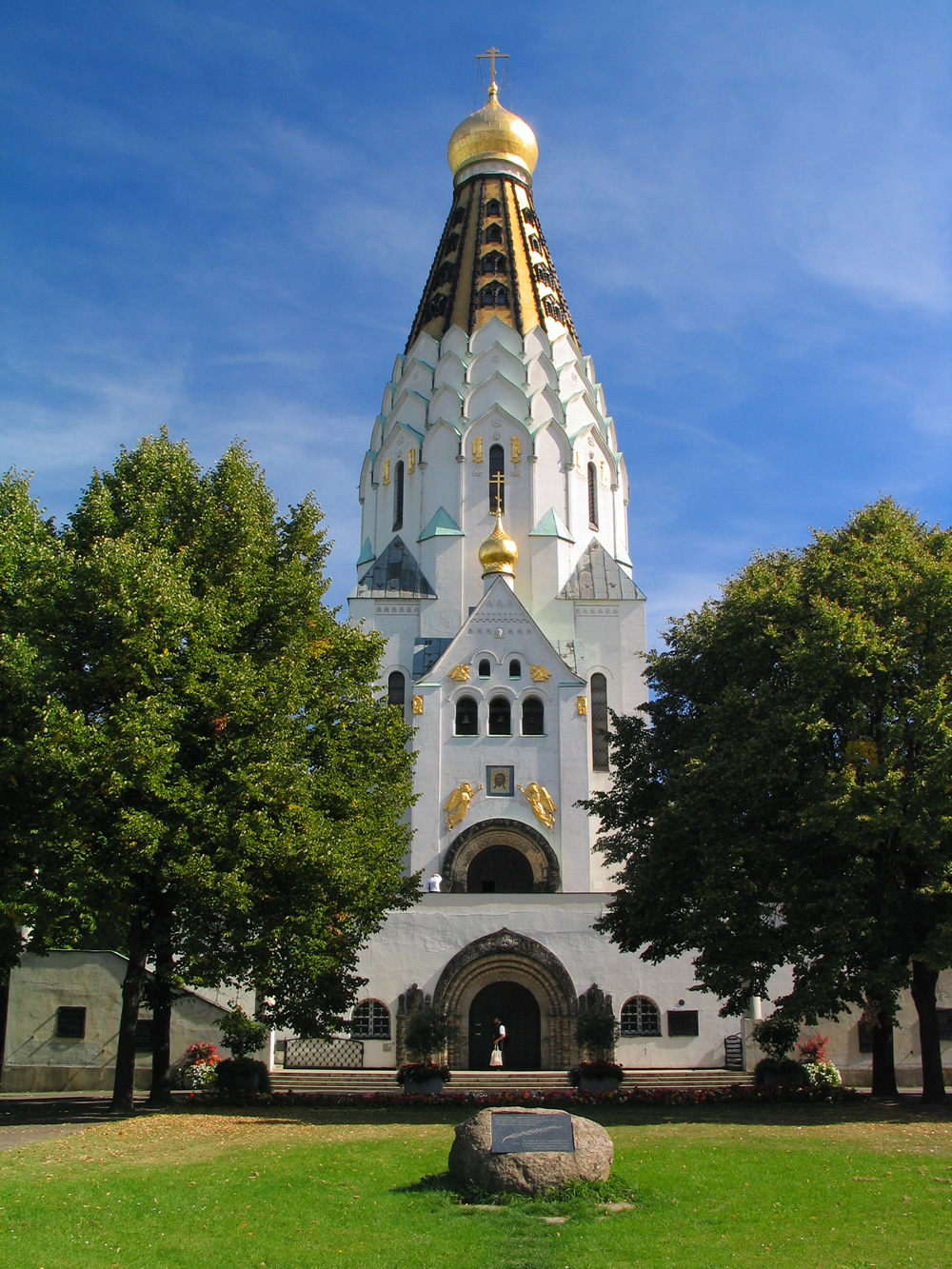
The Russian St.-Alexius Memorial Church in Leipzig

Hermann Georg Carl Weidenbach (born October 1, 1853, in Dresden; died September 30, 1928, in Leipzig) was a German architect from Saxony.

== Life ==
Georg Weidenbach studied with Karl Weißbach in Dresden and was active in Leipzig as of 1886. He was associated briefly with Anton Käppler until he went into business with Richard Tschammer until 1916 under the name "Weidenbach and Tschammer". The firm had been responsible for the 1912–1913 design and construction of the Russian Memorial Church of Saint Alexius, based on the design of the Saint Petersburg Architect Wladimir Alexandrowitsch Pokrowski. Weidenbach and Tschammer were also the general architects for the 1913 International Building Exhibition in Leipzig.

Weidenbach was a city councilor in Leipzig and the chairman of the Leipzig Association for the Promotion of Public Art. He was also a member of the Deutscher Werkbund and the Association of German Architects. He held the honorary Saxon royal titles of Baurat and Geheimer Hofrat. The City of Leipzig honored him on November 19, 1998, by naming a street in the Anger-Crottendorf district "Weidenbachplan."

== Work ==
With Anton Käppler from 1886 to about 1890

- 1886–1888: Clubhouse of the Casino Society in Chemnitz, Theaterstraße (destroyed)
- 1887–1888: Hôtel National (known as Parkhotel from 1913) with a ballroom extension in Fürth, Weinstraße (today Rudolf-Breitscheid-Straße; modified several times, demolished in 2013 despite protests)
- 1887–1889: Renovation of the church in Radeberg

After 1890, in large part in collaboration with Richard Tschammer thumb|Plato-Dolz Monument

- 1891–1893: St. Andrew's Church (Andreaskirche) in Leipzig, Alexis-Schumann-Platz (destroyed)
- 1893: Building of the *Erbländischer Ritterschaftlicher Creditverein* (Hereditary Knightly Credit Association) in Saxony
- 1894: Plato-Dolz Monument in Leipzig, Dittrichring
- 1895–1897: Protestant St. Paul's Church (Paulinerkirche, Leipzig) in Plauen
- 1896–1899: Reformed Church in Leipzig, Tröndlinring
- 1896–1899: Protestant Christ Church (Christuskirche) in Düsseldorf, Kruppstraße; local site supervisor: Moritz Korn
- 1896–1899: Protestant Church of Peace (Friedenskirche) in Düsseldorf, Florastraße; local site supervisor: Moritz Korn
- 1897: "Ressource" Club House (Municipal Playhouse since 1949) in Erfurt, Klostergang
- 1899–1903: Friedrich-Ludwig-Jahn Memorial Hall in Freyburg
- 1898–1903: Protestant St. Luke's Church (Lukaskirche) in Dresden, including rectory and parish hall, Südvorstadt, Lukasplatz
- 1902–1903: Superintendency building in Leipzig, Thomaskirchhof 18
- 1904–1905: Comenius Library in Leipzig, Schenkendorfstraße 34
- 1906–1909: Renovation and expansion of the Town Hall in Zeitz
- 1908–1909: Handelshof (Leipzig) trade fair building in Leipzig, Grimmaische Straße 1–7
- 1911–1913: Administrative building of the Leipzig Fire Insurance AG (after 1949: District Headquarters of the State Security Service, known as the "Round Corner" / *Runde Ecke*) in Leipzig, Dittrichring (jointly with City Building Director Hugo Licht)
- 1912–1913: Various structures for the 1913 International Building Trades Exhibition in Leipzig (Marienbrunn garden suburb)
