= Reformed Church, Dresden =

Church in Dresden, Germany

Coordinates: 51°02′52″N 13°44′18″E

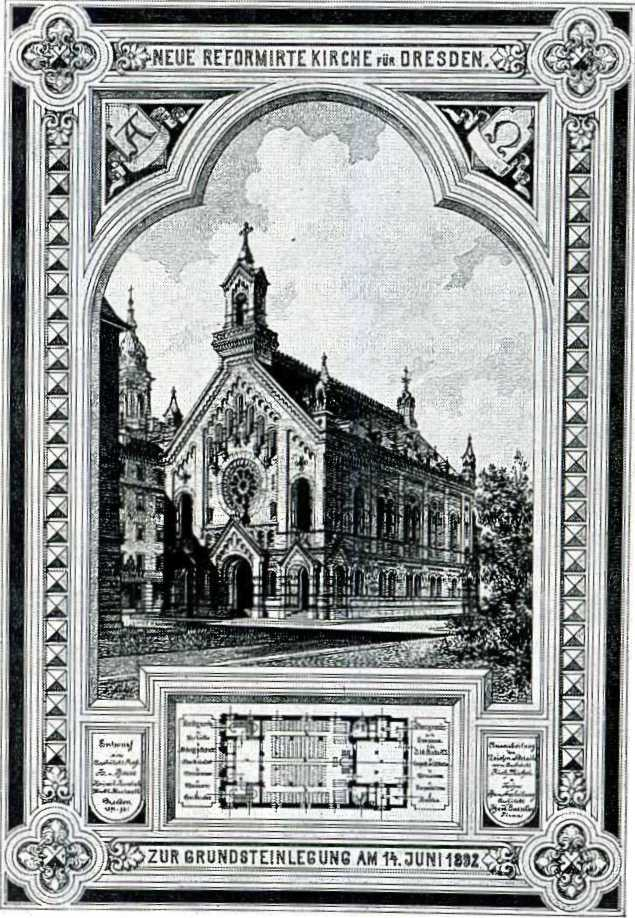
Memorial sheet of the laying of the church's cornerstone, 1892

The Reformed Church (Reformierte Kirche) was a church building in Dresden used by the Evangelical-Reformed Church. It was built on Dr.-Külz-Ring in the Altstadt district in 1894. It was designed by Harald Julius von Bosse. He used Neo-Romanesque designs.

The church was dedicated on 7 March 1894.

It was severely damaged by bombing in 1945.

It was used for a few years after the war until the congregation moved to a new building; it was demolished in 1963.
