= De Arend, Coevorden =

Smock mill in Coevorden, Netherlands

De Arend
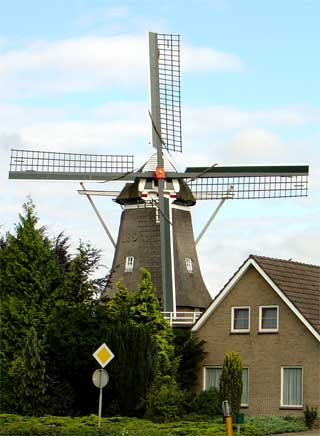

Origin
- Mill name: De Arend
- Mill location: Krimweg 60, 7741 KK, Coevorden
- Coordinates: 52°39′34″N 6°43′28″E
- Operator(s): Gemeente Coevorden
- Year built: 1894

Information
- Purpose: Corn mill
- Type: Smock mill
- Storeys: Three-storey smock
- Base storeys: Two-storey base
- Smock sides: Eight-sided smock
- No. of sails: Four sails
- Type of sails: Common sails
- Windshaft: Cast iron
- Winding: Tailpole and winch
- No. of pairs of millstones: Two pairs
- Size of millstones: 1.50 metres (4 ft 11 in)

De Arend (English The Eagle) is a smock mill in Coevorden, Netherlands. It was built in 1894. The mill is listed as a Rijksmonument, number 11493.

== History ==
De Arend was built by millwrights Ritsema Brothers of Stroobos, Friesland for J B Soppe. It later passed into the ownership of H Soppe. The Dutch magazine De Molenaar of 25 November 1969 stated that the mill was built in 1888. Thus the mill may have been moved here in 1894. In 1937, the mill was repaired and fitted with streamlined sails. The mill was sold to the municipality of Coevorden in 1976. It was in a poor state and overgrown with ivy. Restoration by millwright J D Medendorp of Zuidlaren was completed in 1977.

== Description ==
De Arend is what the Dutch describe as an "achtkante stellingmolen" - an eight-sided smock mill with a stage. The mill has a two-storey brick base and a three-storey smock. The stage is 6.20 metres (20 ft 4 in) above ground level. The smock and cap are thatched. The cap is winded by a tailpole and winch. The four Common sails are carried on a cast-iron windshaft dating from 1863. They have a span of 20.50 metres (67 ft 3 in). The wooden clasp arm brake wheel has 59 cogs. It drives the wallower at the top of the upright shaft. The wallower has 31 cogs. At the bottom of the upright shaft, the great spur wheel with 85 cogs drives two lantern pinion stone nuts, each with 28 staves.
