= Frans Van Dijk =

Belgian architect (1853–1939)

- Born: Franciscus Henricus Van Dijk; 11 October 1853; Berchem, Antwerp, Belgium
- Died: 7 July 1939 (aged 85); Merksem, Antwerp, Belgium
- Occupation: Architect
- Buildings: Royal Museum of Fine Arts in Antwerp (with Jean-Jacques Winders); Saint Michael and Saint Peter's Church in Antwerp

Frans Van Dijk (11 October 1853, Berchem – 20 February 1939, Merksem) was a Belgian architect. He was an important representative of eclecticism in architecture.

He designed the Royal Museum of Fine Arts in Antwerp, the Saint Michael and Saint Peter's Church and a group of six villas in Cogels-Osylei and surroundings of Antwerp. Van Dijk also renovated the Spaengien and rebuilt the De Spieghel and Den Arend on Antwerp's Grote Markt.

Frans Van Dijk and his son Henri (also an architect) are buried in the Antwerp cemetery of Schoonselhof in Hoboken.

== Biography ==
Franciscus Henricus Van Dijk was born in 1853 in Berchem, a southern district and municipality of Antwerp. He was an apprentice, trainee and collaborator of architect Joseph Schadde from 1870 to 1881. Van Dijk was a jury member for the Prix de Rome (Architecture Department) from 1893 to 1901, and professor of architecture at the Royal Academy of Fine Arts of Antwerp from 1902 until 1923.

In the 1880s he designed the Royal Museum of Fine Arts of Antwerp with Jean-Jacques Winders. In 1890, he made the first designs for the Sugar Refinery Peten. As part of his early oeuvre, he restored the Spaengien on the Grote Markt of Antwerp between 1892 and 1893. In 1899 he designed the neo-Baroque Grand Hôtel Métropole on Leysstraat in Antwerp, which is an example of his mature oeuvre. In 1901, Van Dijk was commissioned the ensemble De Biekens in Cogels-Osylei in Berchem by the Naamlooze Maatschappij voor het Bouwen van Burgershuizen of the Oostkwartier. Van Dijk built several mansions in Cogels-Osylei, including Scaldis, an eclectic group of houses, and Baldwin Iron Arm, some of the most notable houses in Zurenborg. Since the 1880s, Van Dijk also completed several works in the Neoclassical style across Antwerp. He designed the Saint Michael and Saint Peter's Church, built between 1893 and 1897 in Antwerp with a nave with columns of Vånevik granite from the Kalmar coast.

Between 1903 and 1904, he built the De Spieghel on the Grote Markt of Antwerp in neo-Gothic style. The building, first mentioned in the 14th century, was completely demolished by the owner Eugène Kreglinger and rebuilt according to a design by Van Dijk and Michel De Braey. In 1906, he rebuilt the Den Arend, also in neo-Gothic style and on Antwerp's Grote Markt. The same year he realized the eclectic ensemble De Twaalf Apostelen ("The Twelve Apostles") on Transvaalstraat in Berchem and made a design for Villa Cleibs in Schoten. In 1909 he was commissioned a mansion on Jan Van Rijswijcklaan by Eugeen Coveliers, which was designed in Neo-Louis XVI style.

Frans Van Dijk and his son Henri (also an architect) are buried in the Antwerp cemetery Schoonselhof (Hoboken), on perk 4 (South side).

== Selected works ==
- 1884–1890: Royal Museum of Fine Arts of Antwerp with Jean-Jacques Winders
- 1893–1897: Saint Michael and Saint Peter's Church in Antwerp
- 1899: Grand Hôtel Métropole on Leysstraat in Antwerp
- 1922–1923: Bank of Commerce in Antwerp with Henri Van Dijk and Joseph Hertogs
- 1901: La Métropole on Leysstraat in Antwerp
- 1901: De Biekens on Cogels-Osylei in Berchem
- 1902: Brasserie-concert Oud België on Kipdorpvest in Antwerp
- 1903: House group Scaldis in Cogels-Osylei
- 1903–1904: De Spieghel on the Grote Markt of Antwerp
- 1906: Villa Cleibs in Schoten, Antwerp
- 1906: Den Arend on the Grote Markt of Antwerp
- 1906: German evangelical nursing home on Lange Winkelstraat in Antwerp
- 1906: Ensemble The Twelve Apostles on Transvaalstraat in Antwerp
- 1907: Antwerp Mortgage Fund on Huidevettersstraat in Antwerp
- 1907: Eclectic house on Van Putlei in Antwerp
- 1909: Neo-Louis XVI style mansion on Jan Van Rijswijcklaan in Antwerp
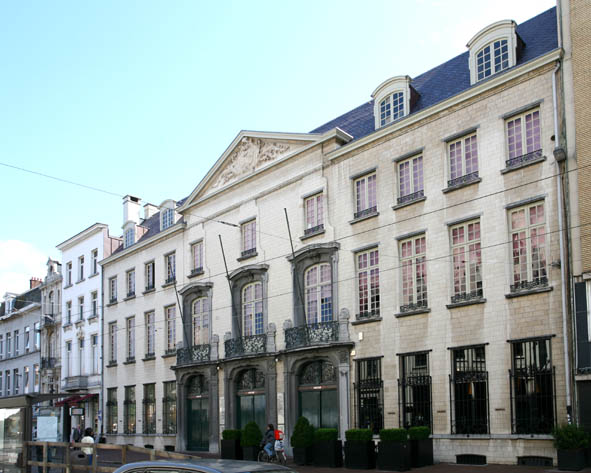
Banque de Commerce in Antwerp

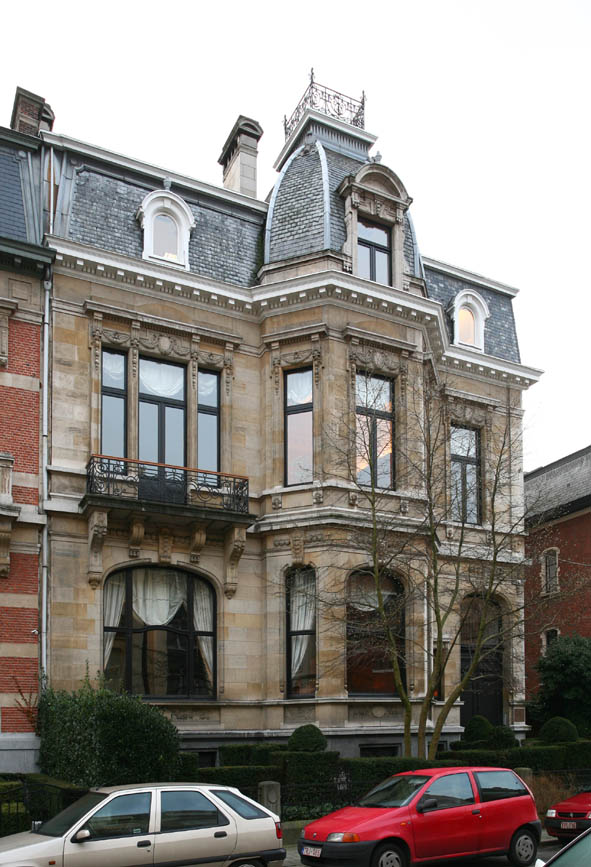
Eclectic mansion on Van Putlei in Antwerp

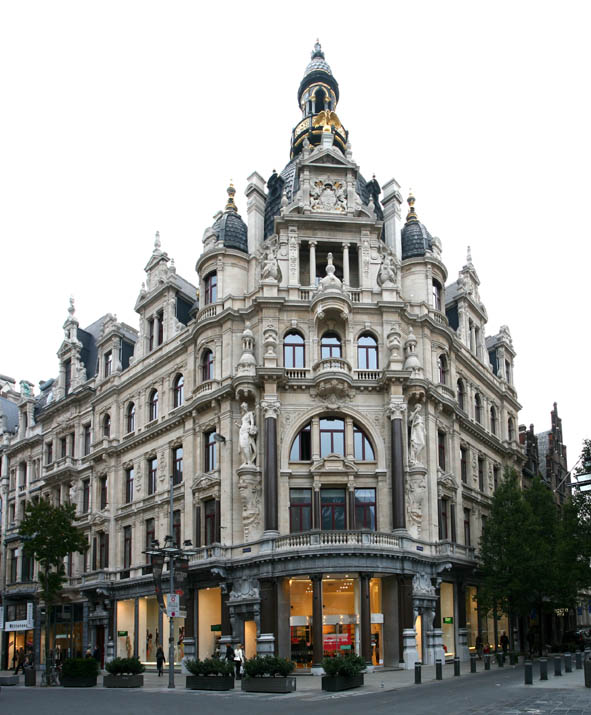
Grand Hôtel Métropole on Leysstraat in Antwerp

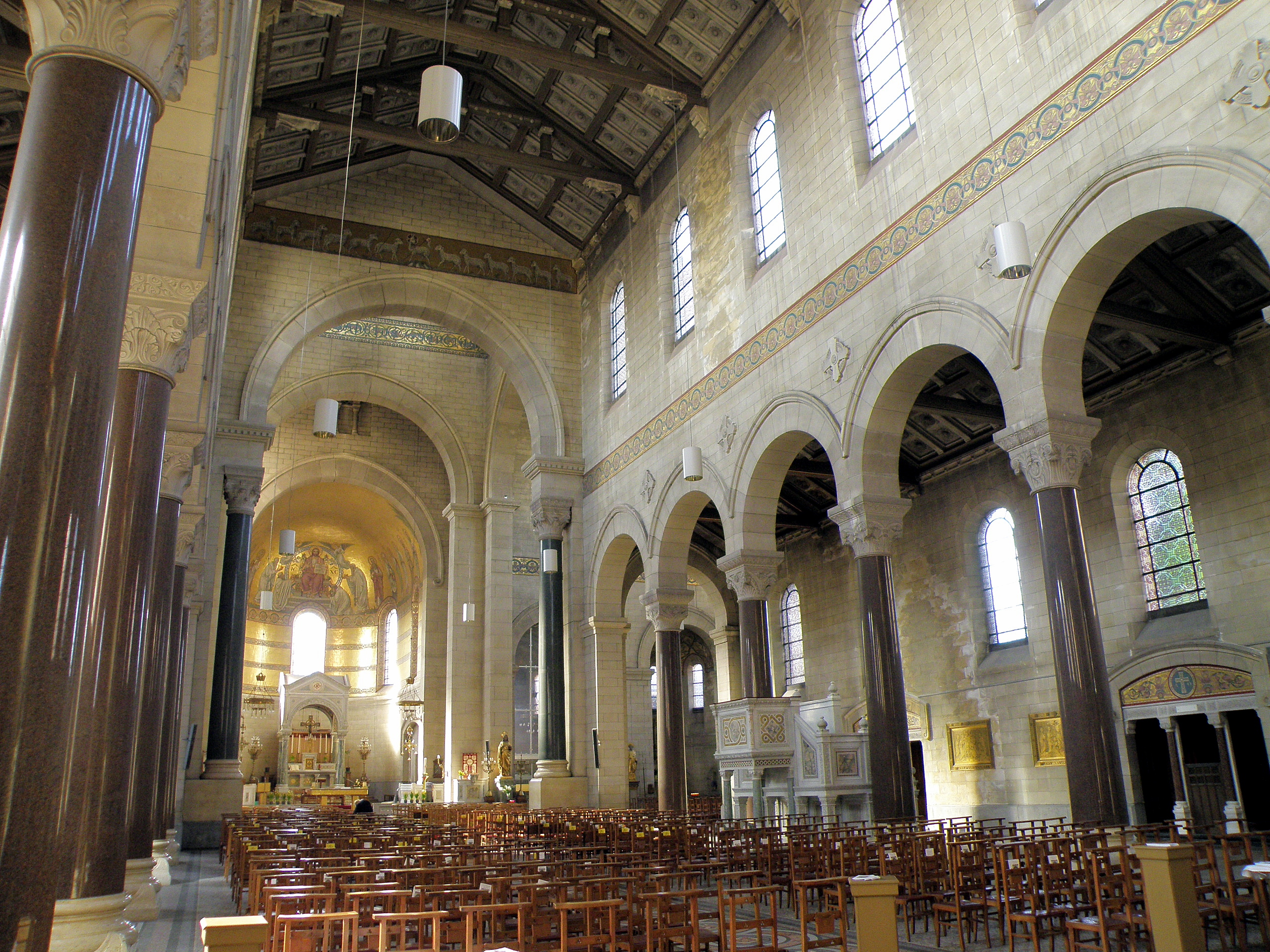
Interior of Saint Michael and Saint Peter's Church in Antwerp

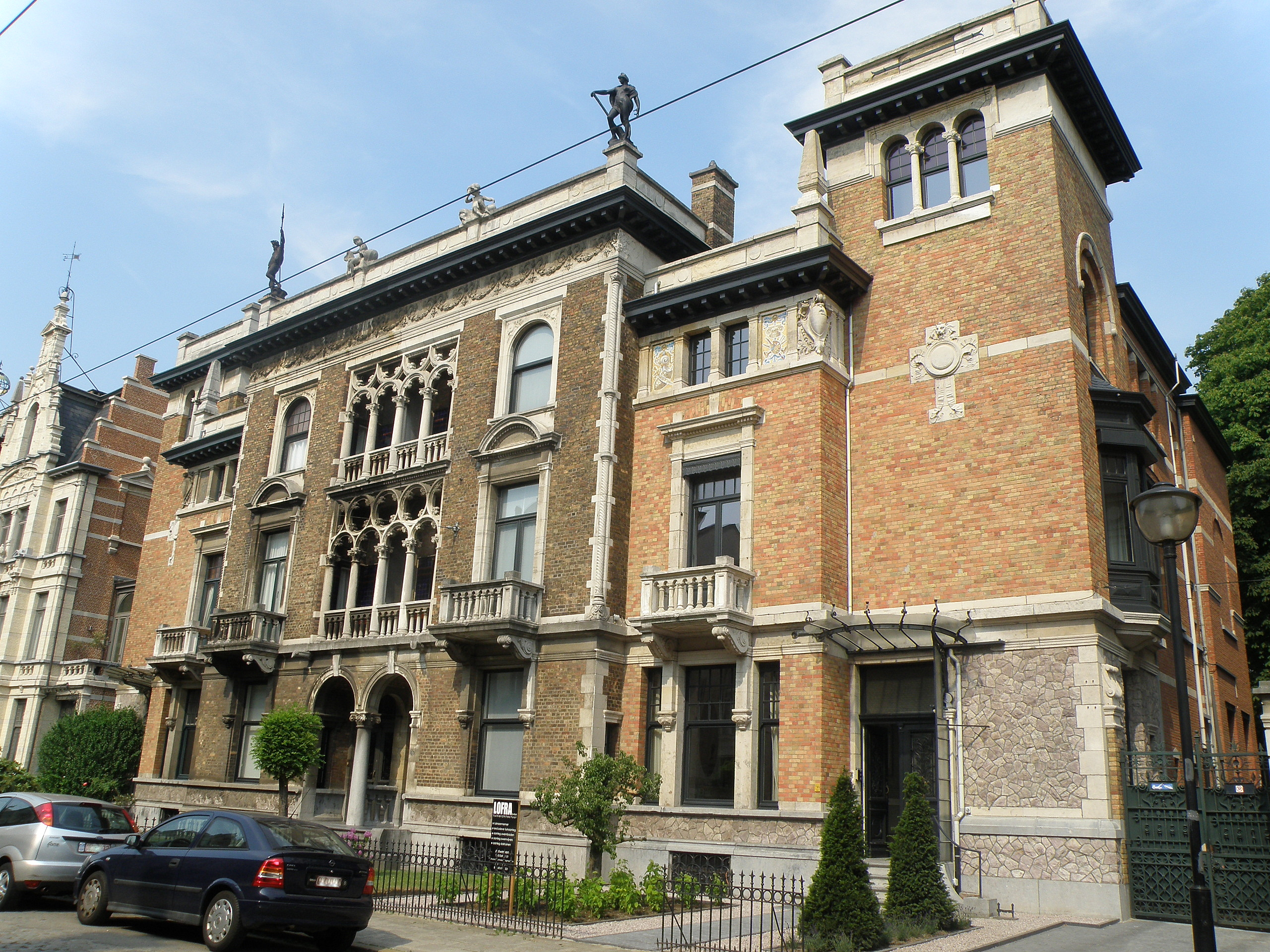
House group Scaldis in Zurenborg

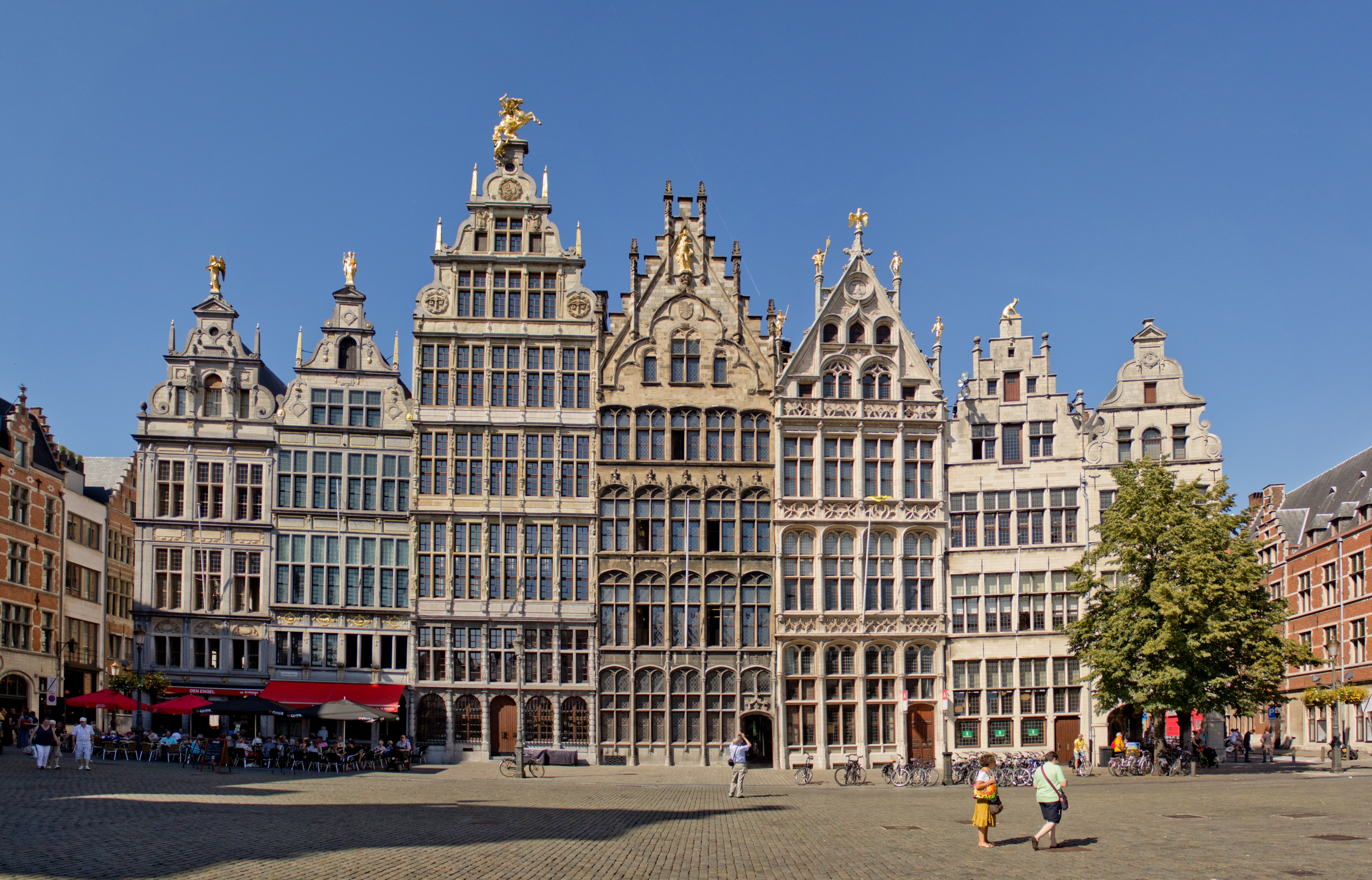
De Spieghel and Den Arend on Grote Markt in Antwerp

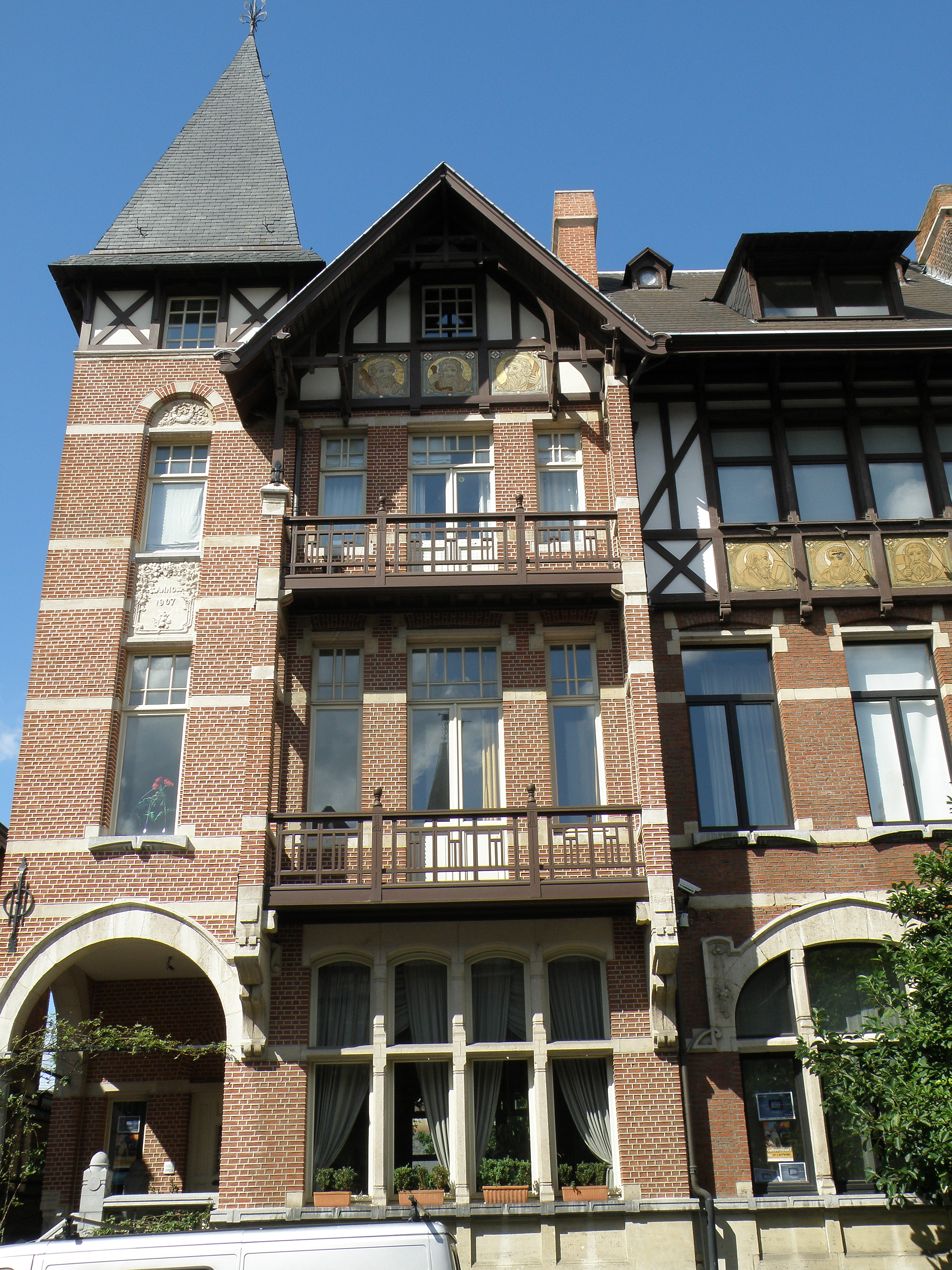
Ensemble De Twaalf Apostelen in Berchem

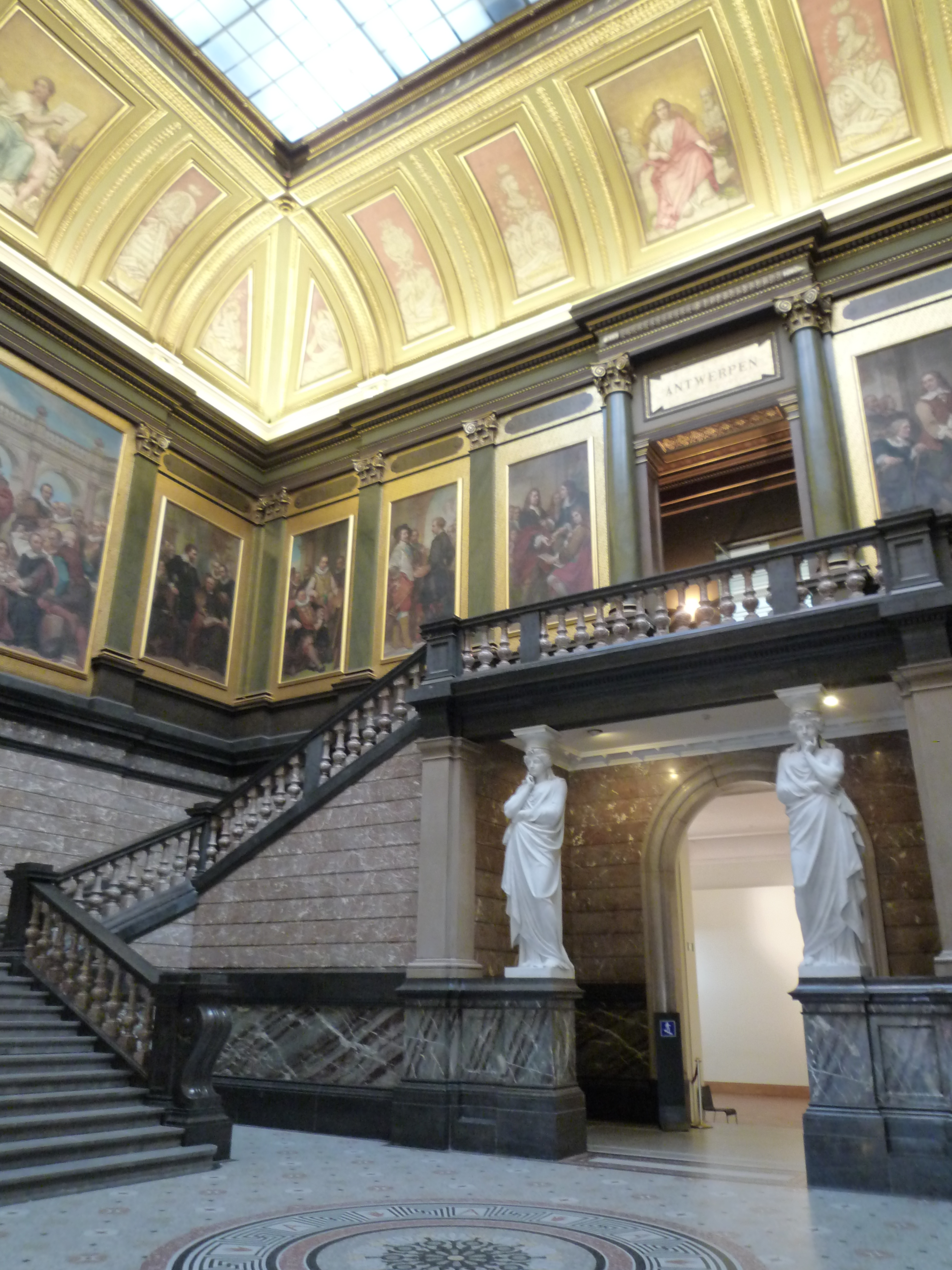
Interior of the Royal Museum of Fine Arts of Antwerp
