= Jean-Jacques Winders =

Belgian architect and sculptor (1849–1936)

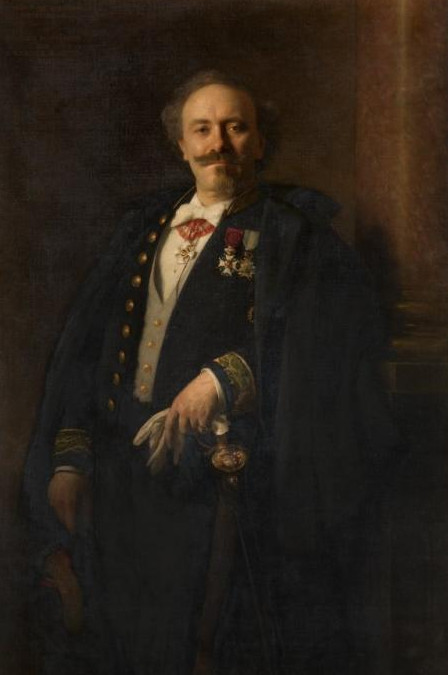
- Jean-Jacques Winders, portrayed by Edouard de Jans
- Born: Joannes Jacobus Henricus Victor Winders; 14 May 1849; Antwerp, Belgium
- Died: 20 February 1936 (aged 86); Antwerp, Belgium
- Occupation: Architect
- Buildings: Royal Museum of Fine Arts in Antwerp (with Frans Van Dijk); Monument Schelde Vrij in Antwerp

Jean-Jacques Winders (14 May 1849, Antwerp – 20 February 1936, Antwerp) was a Belgian architect.

He designed the Royal Museum of Fine Arts in Antwerp with Frans Van Dijk, the Schelde Vrij monument and his own house De Passer from 1883, which was protected as a monument in Belgium in 1981. Initially he designed buildings in an eclectic style, from 1880 his designs were in the Flemish neo-Renaissance style, of which his house is a typical example.

== Biography ==
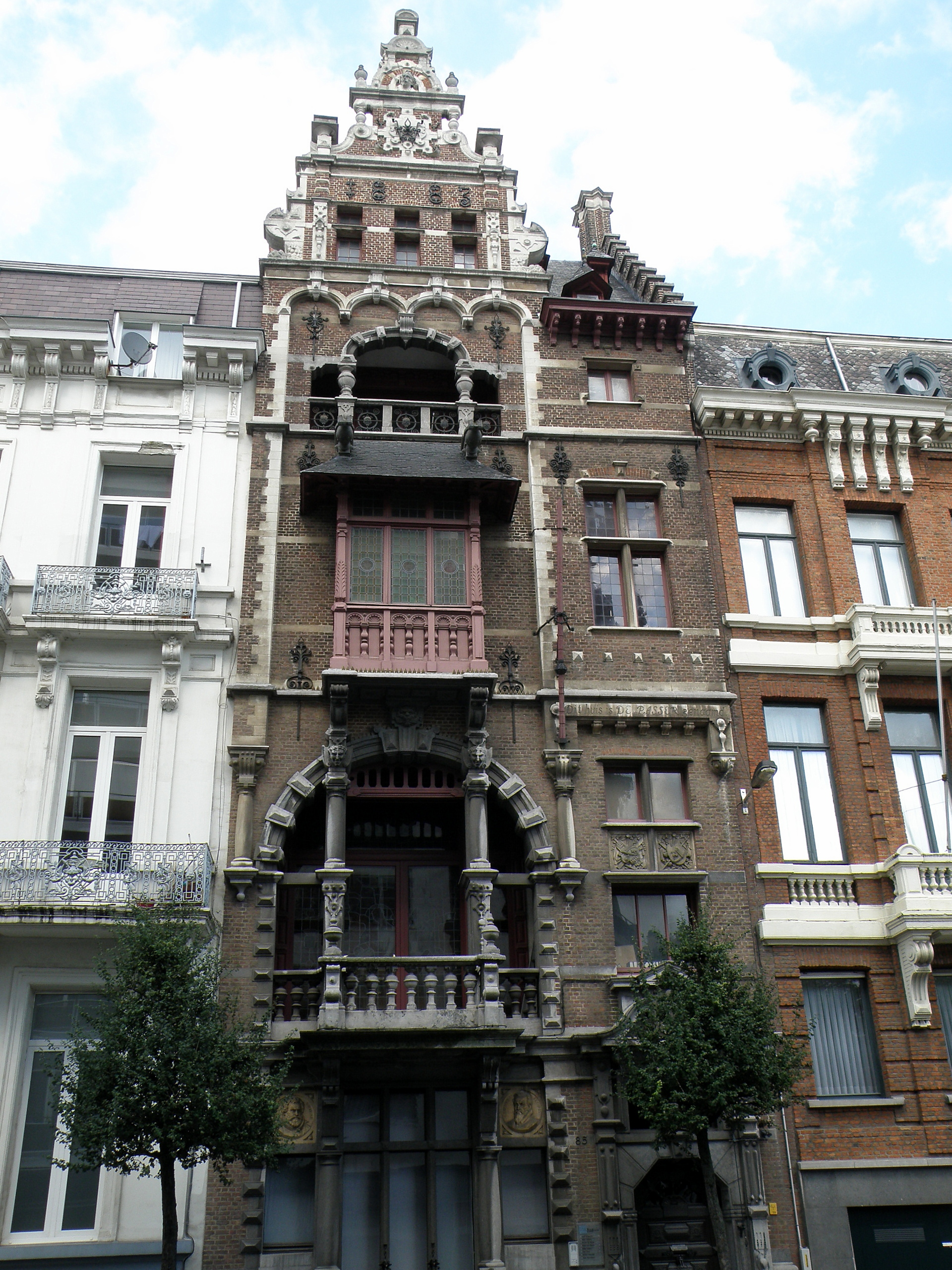
House De Passer (1882–1883)

Joannes Jacobus Henricus Victor Winders was born in Antwerp on 14 May 1849. He came from an Antwerp family that was active in the construction industry. His grandfather was a contractor and his father, Jean-Baptiste Winders, was a contractor-architect who, from 1859, played a role in the construction of the Brialmont Forts around the city. The young Jean-Jacques Winders followed in his father's footsteps, attending his father's construction sites since he was 17. He then studied at the Royal Academy of Fine Arts of Antwerp. By 1868 he had established himself as an architect, realizing the Antwerp house of painter Jules Wagner that year.

His first remarkable assignment was the Monument Schelde Vrij in Antwerp. He won the design competition for the monument in 1873, and although it was supposed to be finished by the next year, delays postponed its inauguration, which took place in 1883. Another important assignment was the Royal Museum of Fine Arts in Antwerp, which he designed with Frans Van Dijk. Winders' style was initially eclectic, but in the late 1870s he drastically change his style to Flemish neo-Renaissence style, of which he became one of the most important exponents. His most important work in this style is his own house, Den Passer on Tolstraat in Antwerp.

Winders was also a teacher, and taught at the Royal Academy of Fine Arts of Antwerp from 1895.

His son Max followed in his footsteps becoming an architect as well.

== Selected works ==
- 1873–1883: Monument Schelde Vrij on Marnixplaats in Antwerp
- 1885: Tobacco factory Stanislas Pauwels on Wijngaardstraat in Antwerp
- 1883: Entrepot Steenacker on Sanderusstraat in Antwerp
- 1884–1990: Royal Museum of Fine Arts of Antwerp with Frans Van Dijk
- 1885: Town Hall of Gilly
- 1896: Town Hall of Emblem
- 1906: Post Office of Mortsel
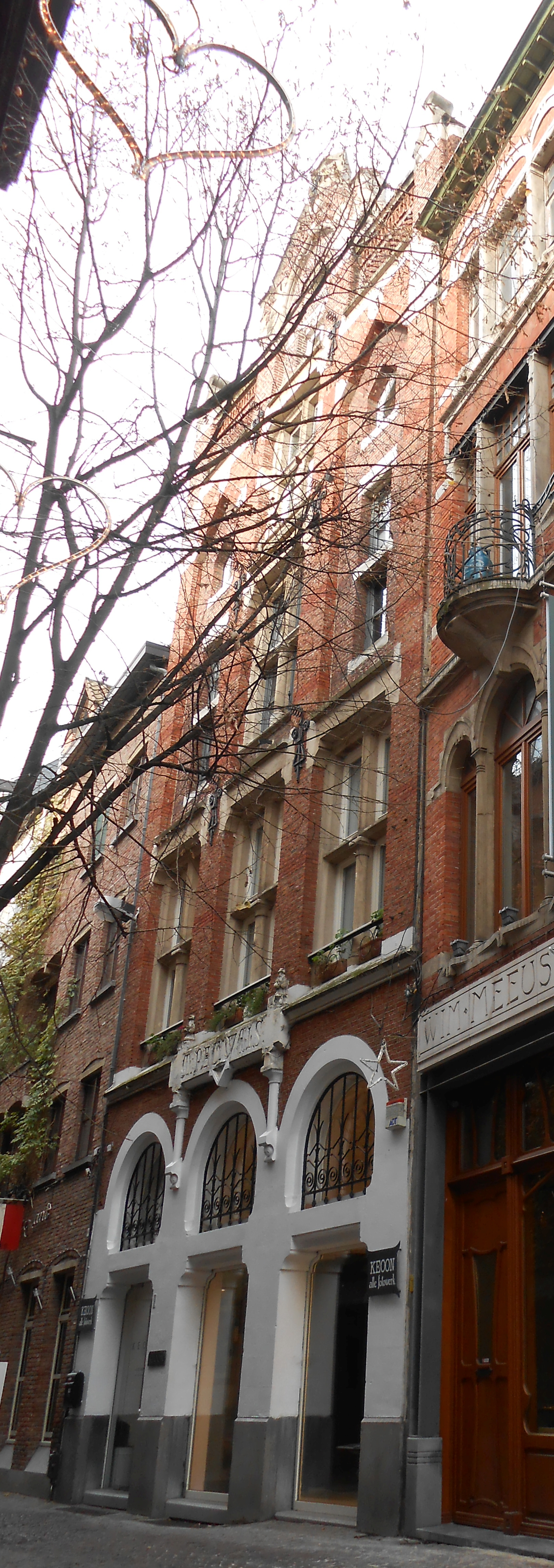
Tobacco factory Stanislas Pauwels (1875)

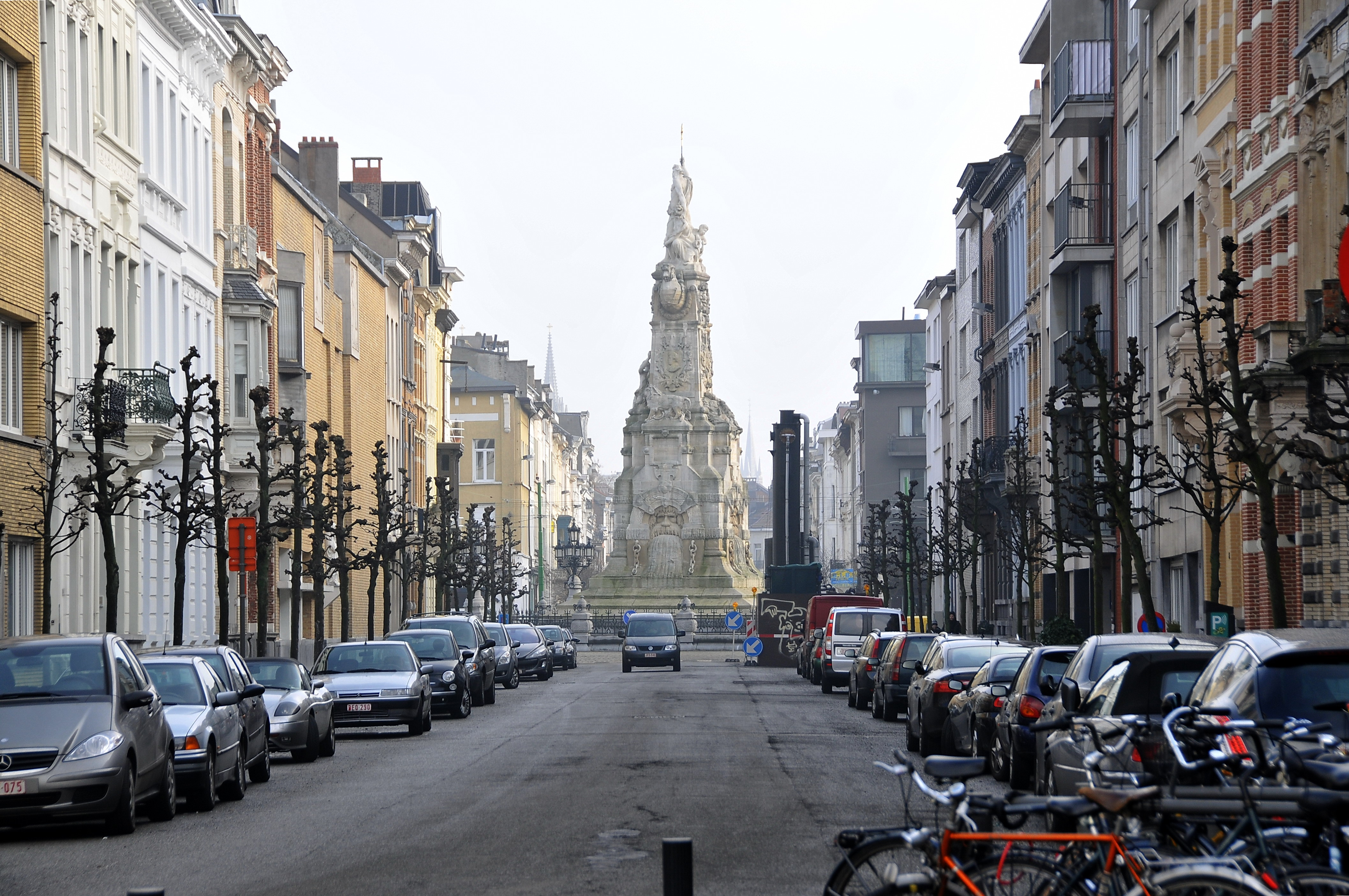
Monument Schelde Vrij (1883)

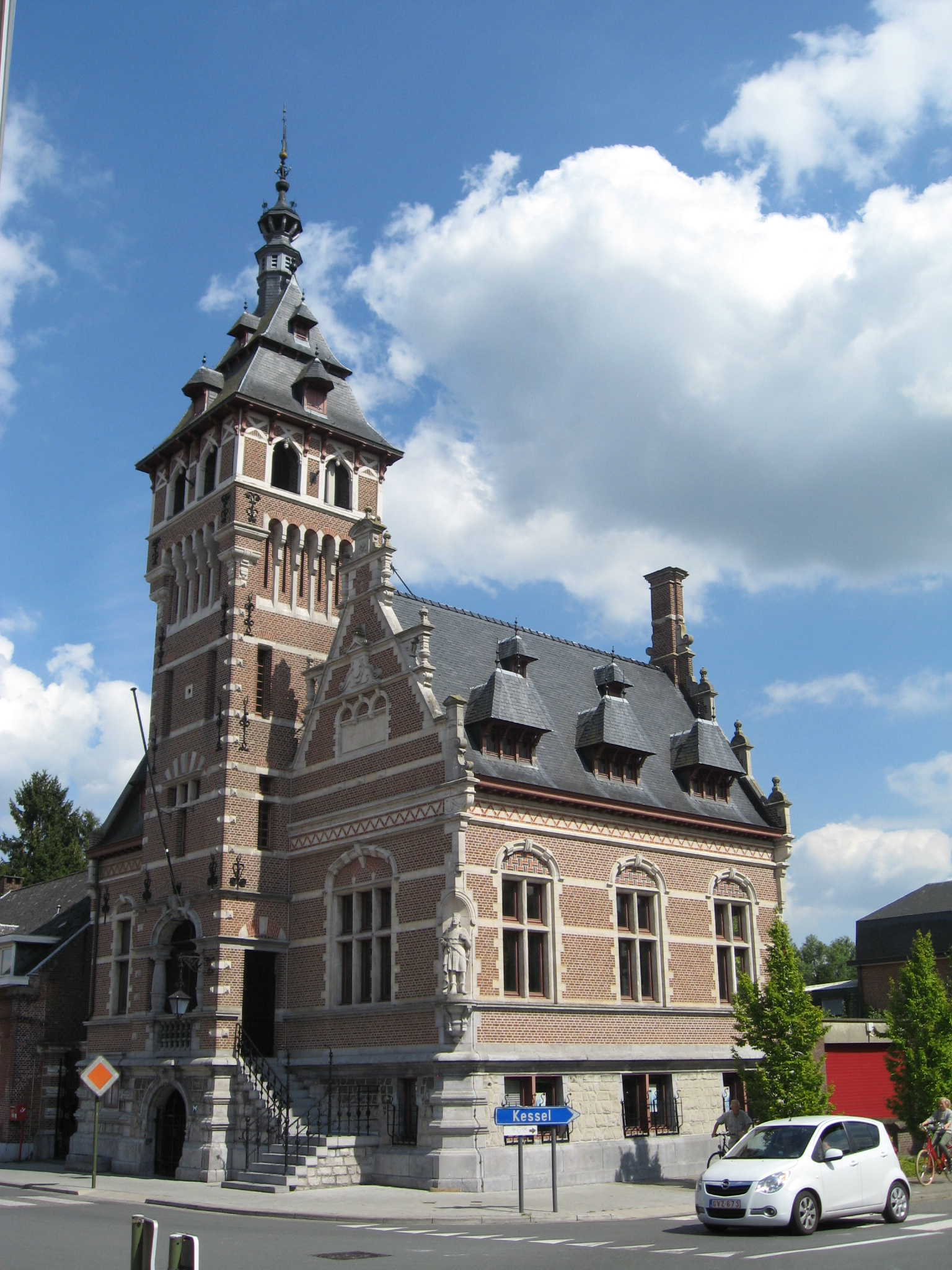
Former town hall of Emblem (1896)

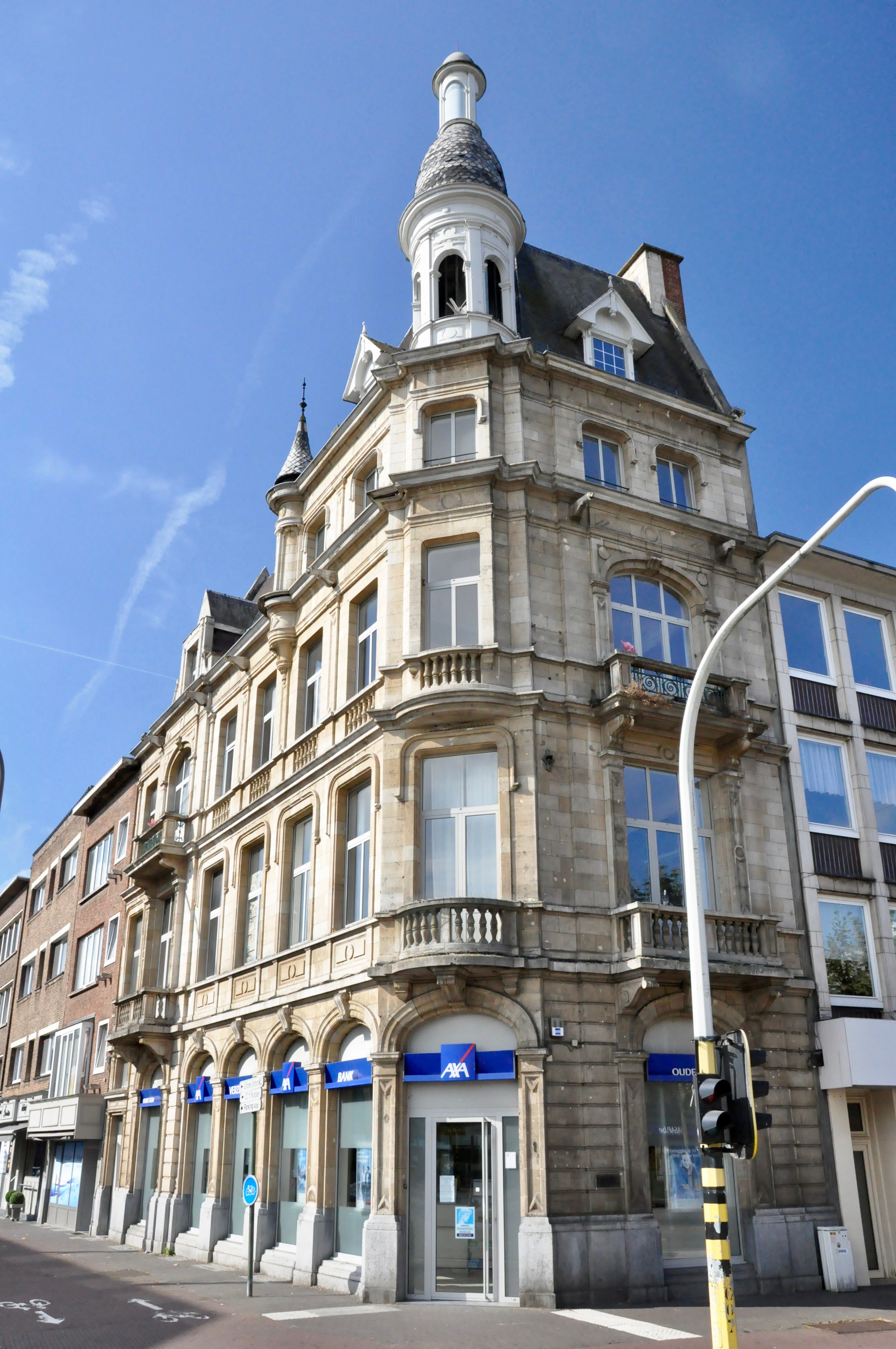
Former Mortsel post office (1906)
