= Quatro de Setembro Theater =

Coordinates: 5°5′28.3″S 42°48′48.1″W

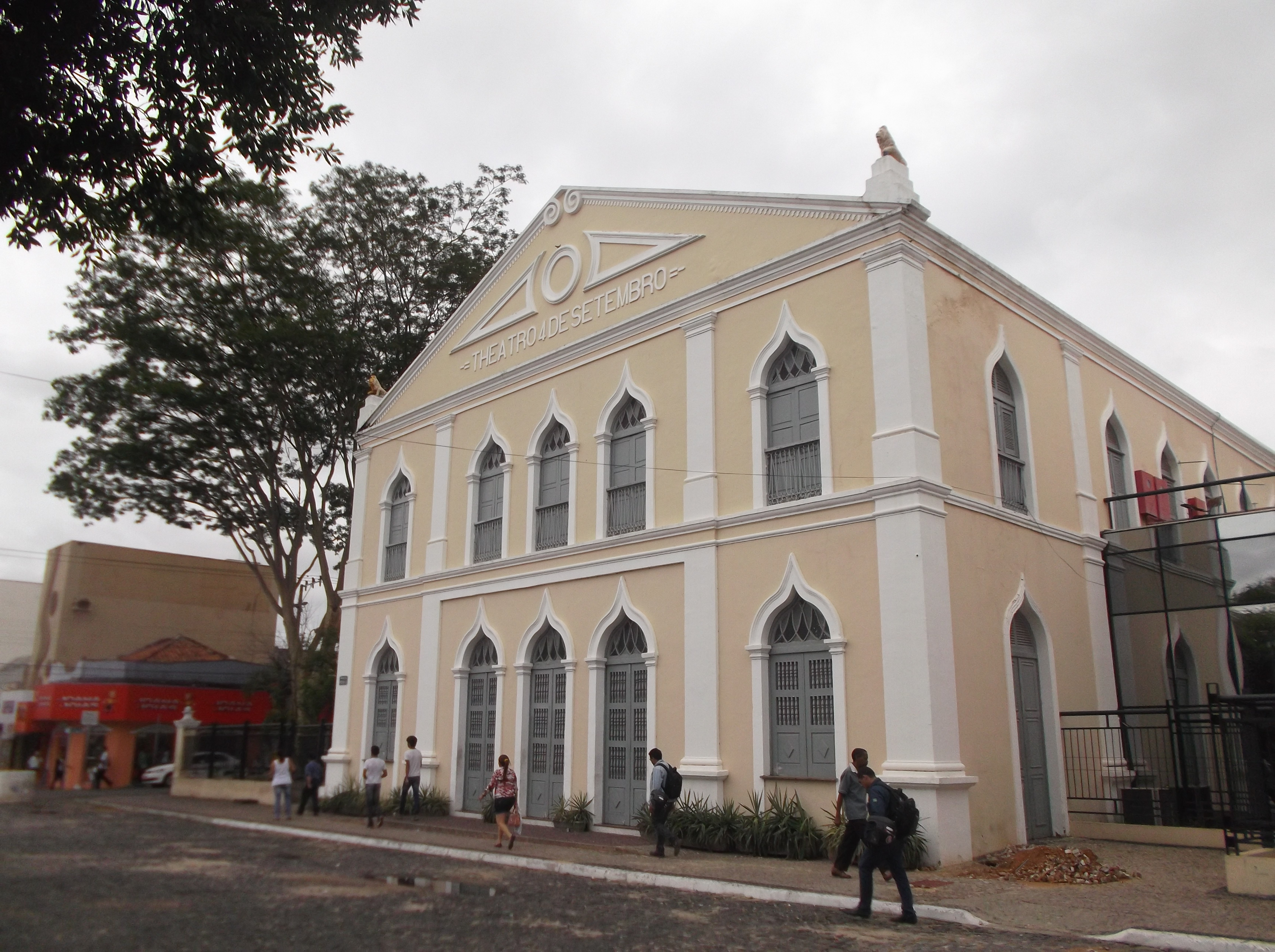
An Image of Quatro de Setembro Theater

Quatro de Setembro Theater (Teatro 4 de Setembro, or 4 September theatre) is located in the Brazilian city of Teresina, capital of Piauí state. It was inaugurated on April 21, 1894. It has a capacity of 560.
