= Harald Julius von Bosse =

German architect and painter (1812–1894)

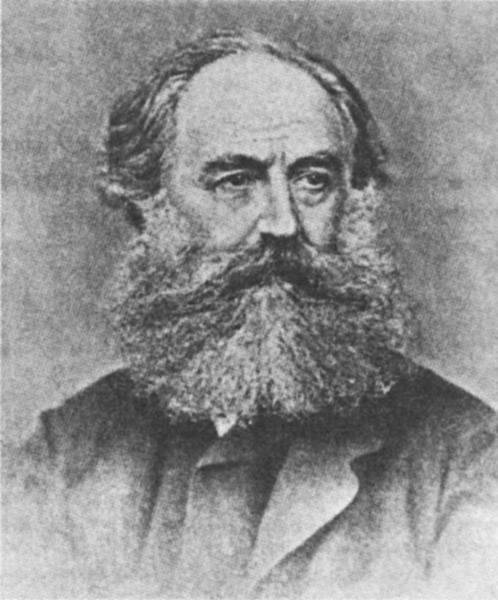
Harald Julius von Bosse (1812–1894)

Harald Julius von Bosse (Russian: Гаральд Юлиус Боссе, romanized: Garald Yulius Bosse; 28 September 1812 – 10 March 1894) was a German architect and painter active in Russia. He was descended from a Baltic German noble family.

== Life ==
He was born in Lievburg nearby Saint Petersburg. He studied at Darmstadt and moved to Saint Petersburg in 1831. He worked in Alexander Brullov's studio and was made a free painter in the Imperial Academy of Arts in 1832, an academician there in 1839 and a professor there in 1854. He designed public buildings and became court architect in 1858. He retired in 1863 and moved to Dresden for health reasons, spending his final years there. In 1872 he designed its Reformed Church. He also designed Dresden's Russian Orthodox Church.

Among his other well-known works is the German Church in Helsinki, Finland, a work attributed jointly to von Bosse and Swedish-born architect Carl Johan von Heideken, the work being completed in 1864. He died in Dresden.

== Artistic method ==
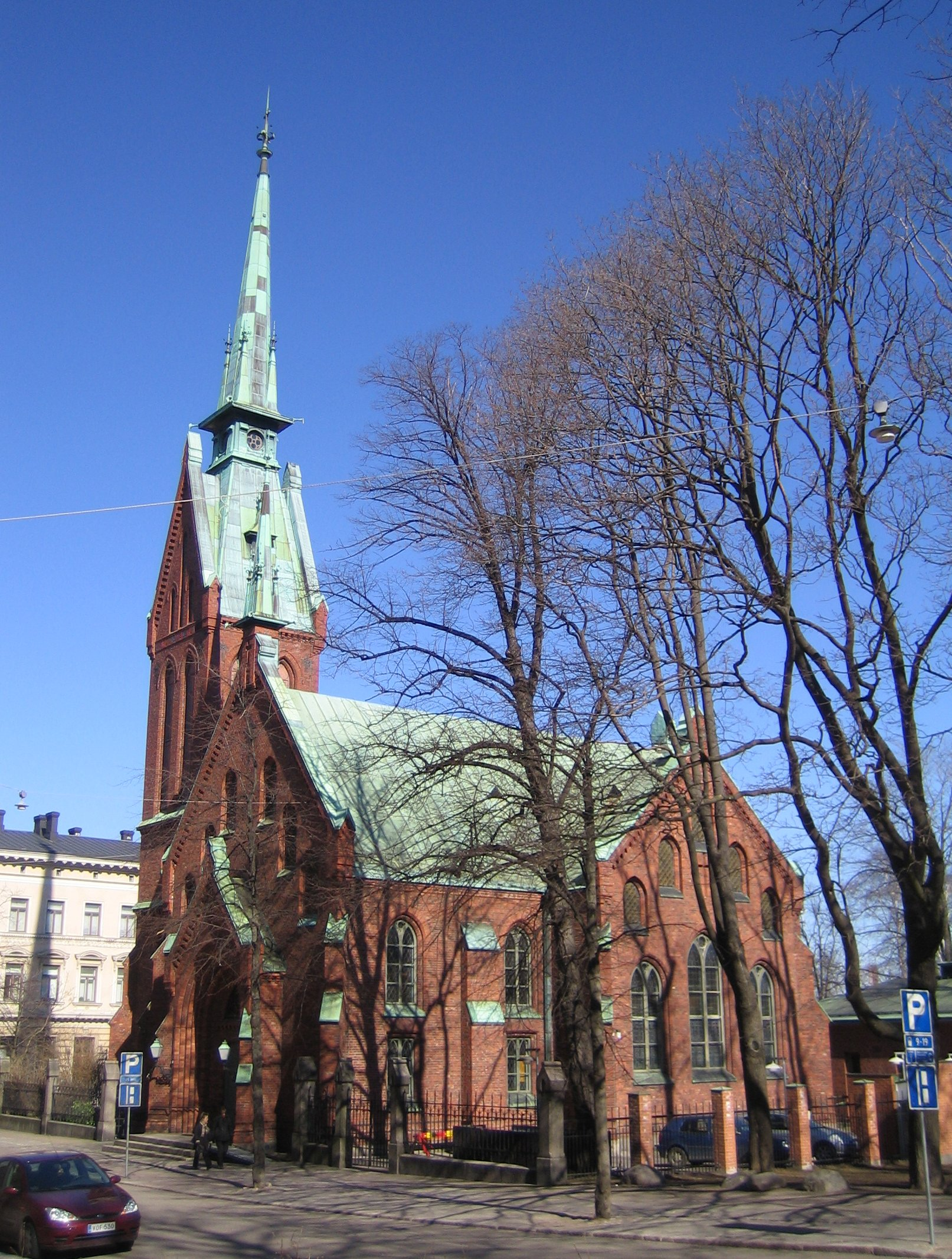
German Church, Helsinki (1864), Harald Julius von Bosse and Carl Johan von Heideken.

According to the aesthetics of the Historicism period, the architect Bosse tried his hand at different "historic styles". In his designs for country houses of the late 1830s to mid-1840s he worked mainly "in the English cottage style, using elements of Gothic decoration".

The architect's style evolved from strict classicism to the neo-Renaissance style. The neo-Renaissance style was adopted by the House of Ivan Pashkov on Liteyny Avenue in St Petersburg (1841–1844), similarly decorated are the facades of the residential buildings on Bolshaya Konyushennaya Street, the mansion of E.P. Saltykova on Bolshaya Morskaya and the mansions of M.V. Kochubey and A.A. Polovtsov. However, the interiors of the residences are decorated in different styles: Neo-Baroque, Neo-Rococo, Byzantine, Moorish and Gothic.

The facade of E. M. Buturlina's house on Tchaikovsky Street is one of the most striking examples of the "second baroque" in St. Petersburg, imitating the Winter Palace by Francesco Bartolomeo Rastrelli.

While rebuilding the Boudoir of Empress Maria Alexandrovna in the Winter Palace Bosse chose the Rococo style; he replaced the original blue colour with bright scarlet silk and gilded details.

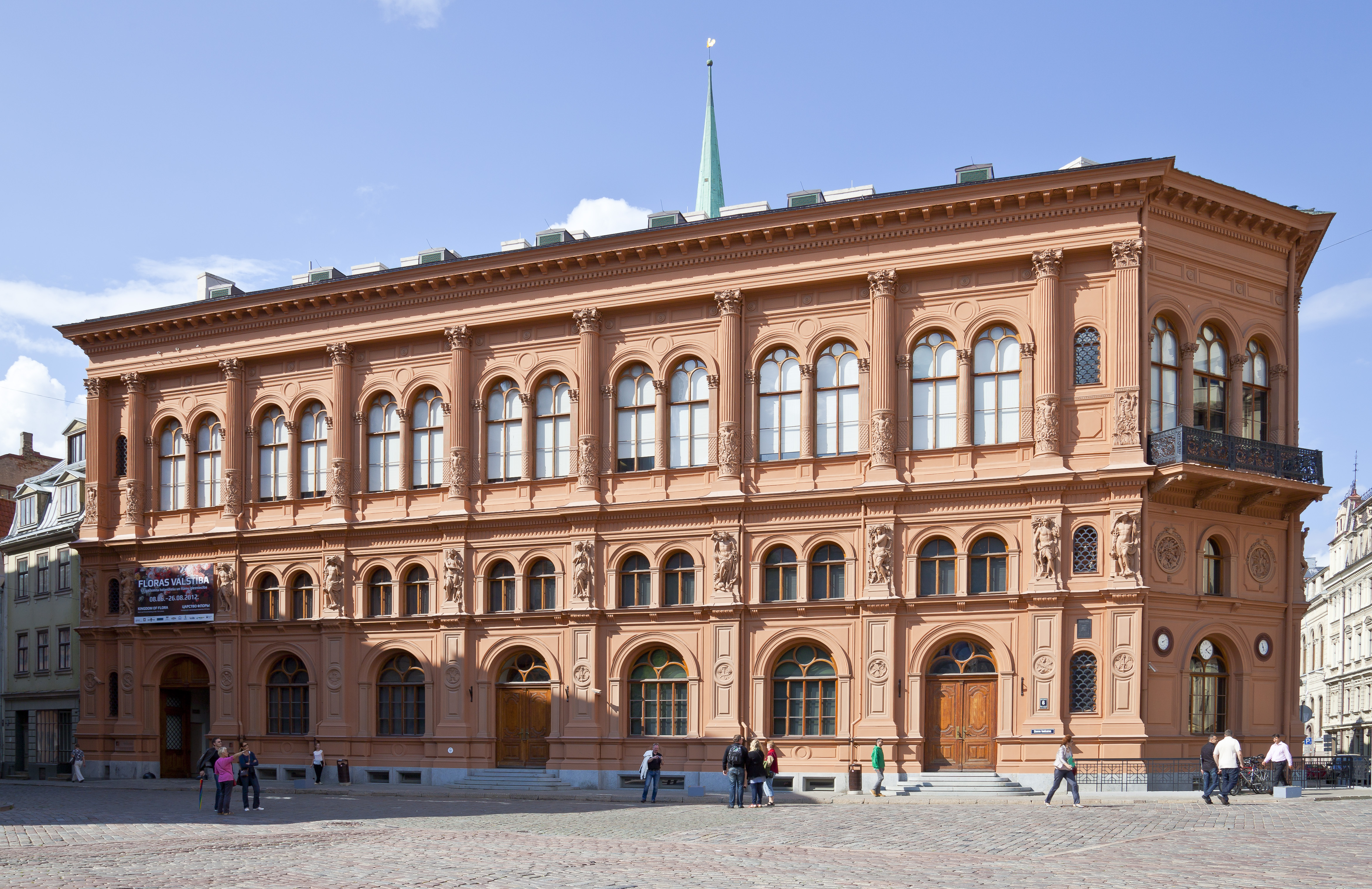
Riga Bourse

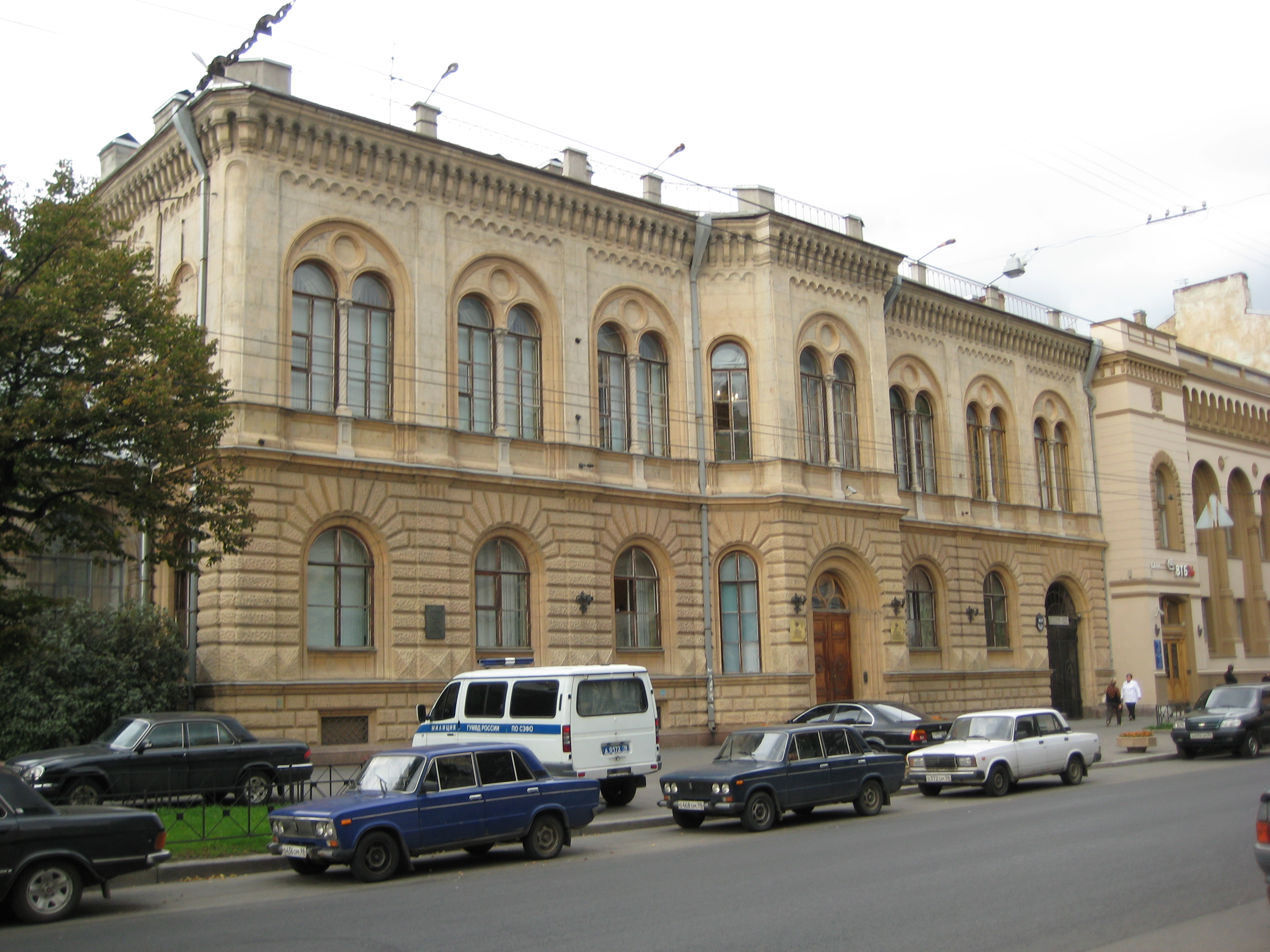
Prince Kochubey's residence on Tchaikovsky Street (1845–1846)

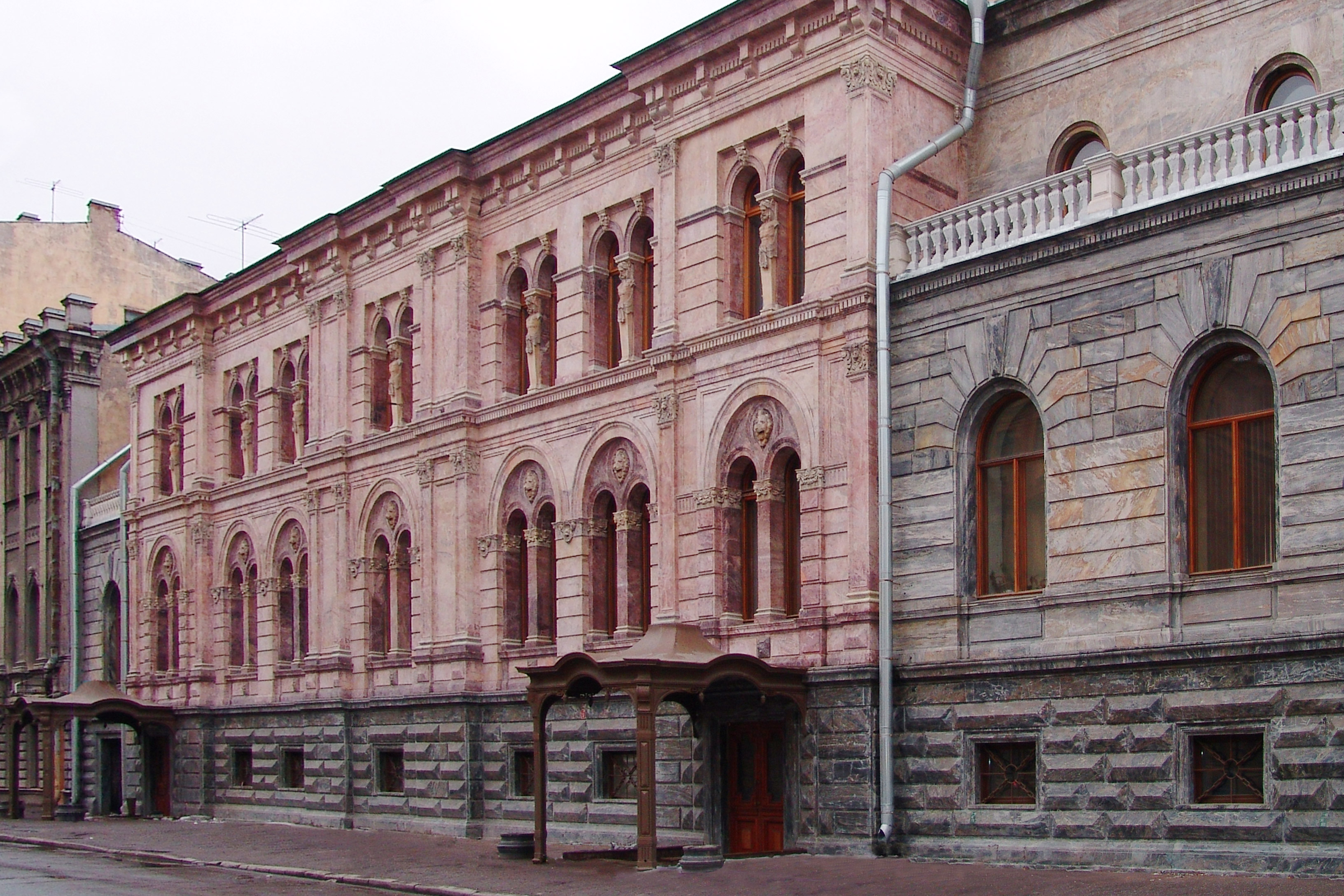
Residence of Count Kushelev-Besborodko on Gagarinskaya Street (1840s.)

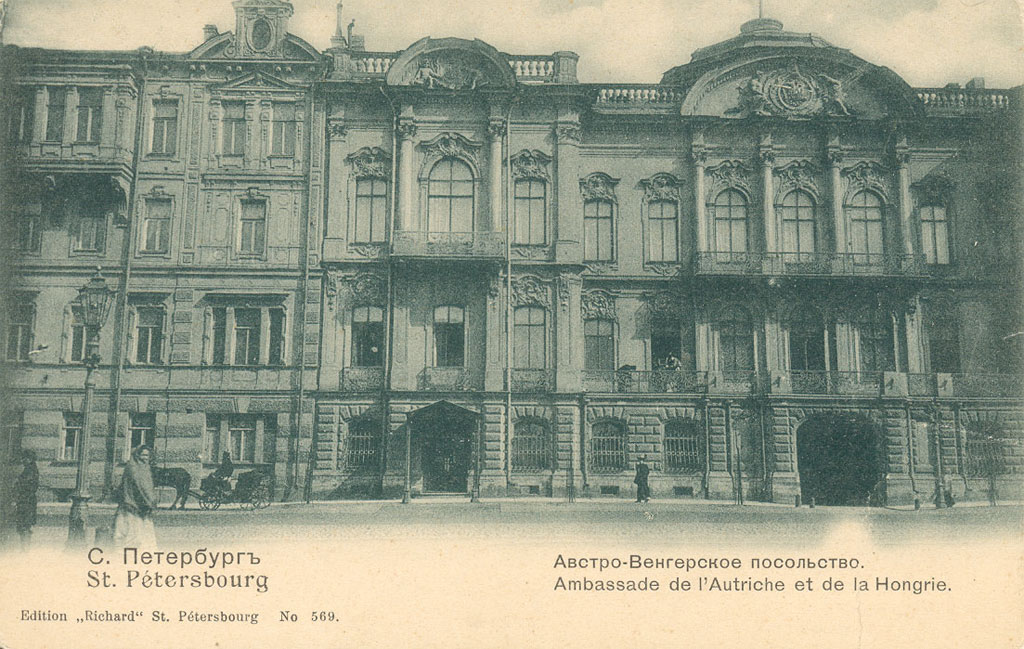
Residence of E. M. Buturlina (1857–1860)

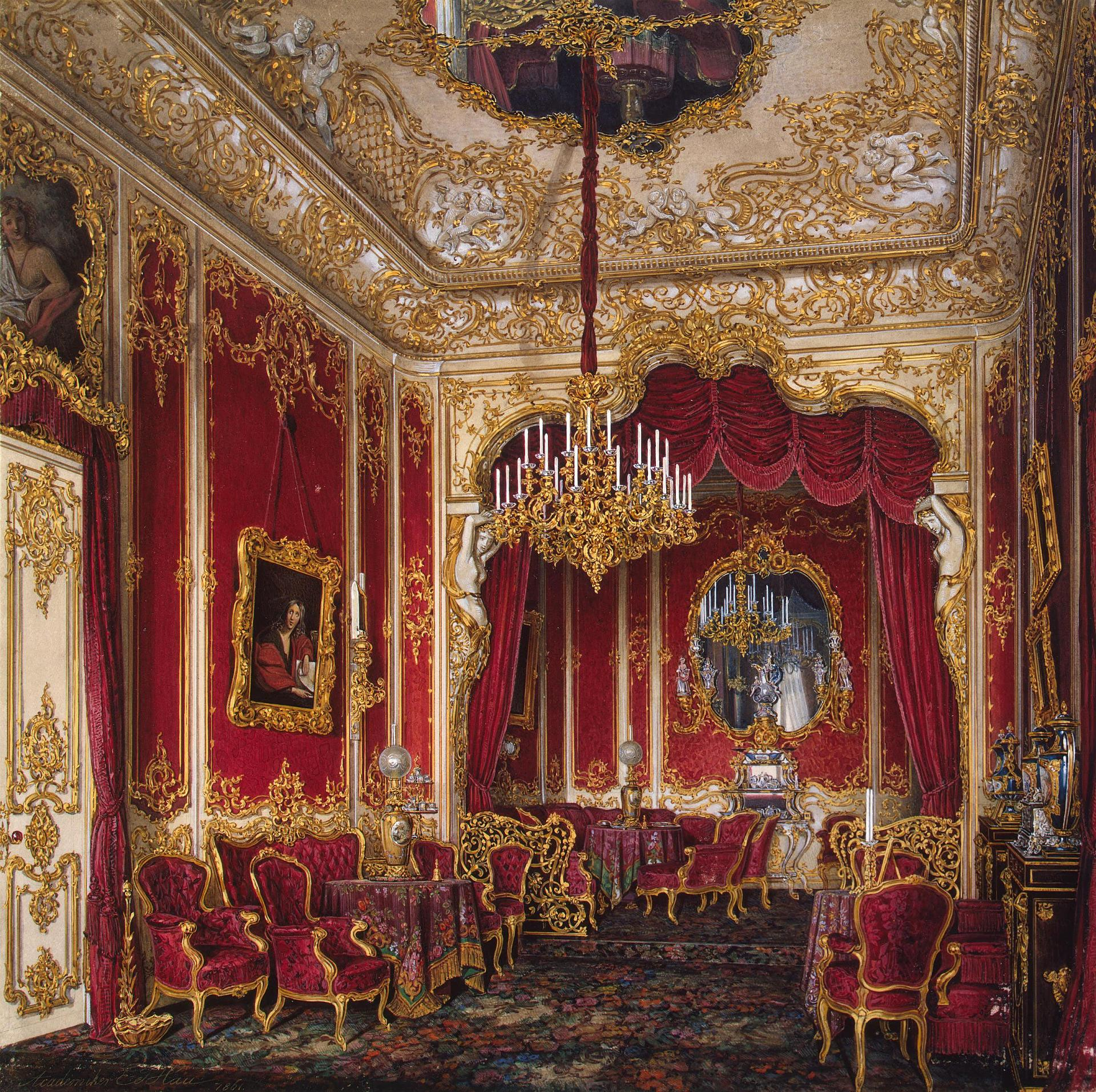
Empress Maria Alexandrovna's boudoir in the Winter Palace (1853)

== See also ==
- List of German painters
