= 1808 in architecture =

The year 1808 in architecture involved some significant events.

== Buildings and structures ==
=== Buildings completed ===
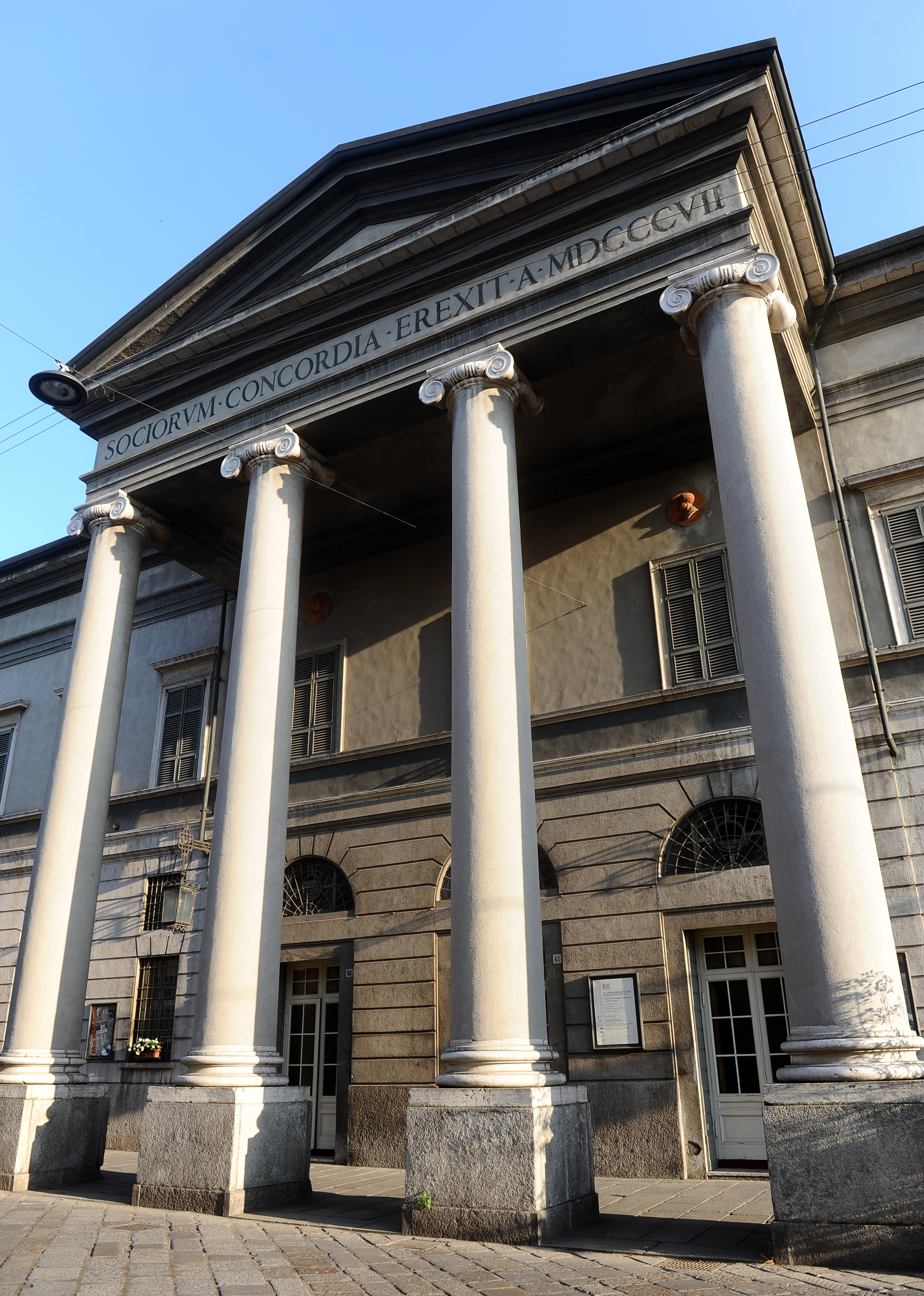
Teatro della Concordia in Cremona, Italy

- Arc de Triomphe du Carrousel, Paris, France.
- Fort Edgecomb, an octagonal, wooden, two-story blockhouse, built in Lincoln County, Maine, USA, to protect Wiscasset's seaport (settled in 1663 on the tidal waters of the Sheepscot River).
- Fountain in front of Mission Santa Barbara, California, USA.
- Hotel Polski, Warsaw, Poland.
- Potseluev Bridge (new cast-iron bridge) across the Moyka River in Saint Petersburg, Russia.
- Sheffield Old Town Hall, England, UK.
- Leeds Library, England, UK, by Thomas Johnson.
- Sparks Shot Tower in Philadelphia, Pennsylvania, USA.
- Teatro della Concordia, designed by Luigi Canonica, in Cremona, Italy.
- Reconstruction of palace at Natolin, Poland, by Chrystian Piotr Aigner for Stanisław Kostka Potocki.

== Events ==
- January 12 – John Rennie's scheme to defend St Mary's Church, Reculver in south east England, founded in 669, from coastal erosion is abandoned in favour of demolition, despite the church being an exemplar of Anglo-Saxon architecture and sculpture.

== Awards ==
- Grand Prix de Rome, architecture: Achille-François-René Leclère.

== Births ==
- January 22 – James Fergusson, Scottish writer on architecture (died 1886)
- July 25 – Francis Thompson, English architect working chiefly on railways (died 1895)

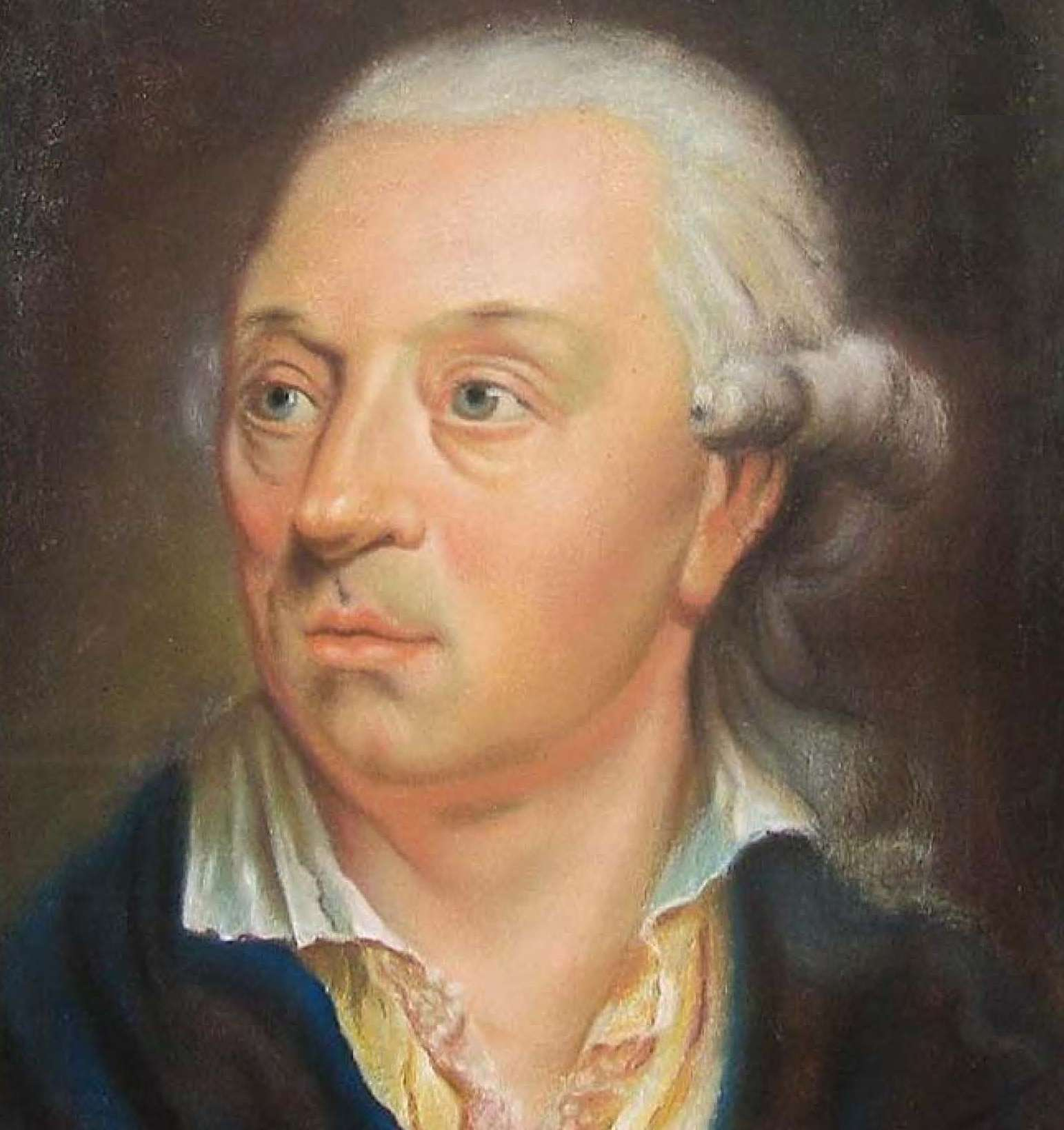
Carl Gotthard Langhans

- February 13 – Robert Russell, Australian architect and surveyor (died 1900)
- October 28 – Emilio De Fabris, Florentine architect (died 1883)
- date unknown – Jean-Baptiste Schacre, French draughtsman and architect (died 1876)

== Deaths ==
- February 18 – Giuseppe Piermarini, Italian architect (born 1734)
- March 9 – Joseph Bonomi the Elder, Italian-born architect and draughtsman (born 1739)
- October 1 – Carl Gotthard Langhans, Prussian builder and architect (born 1732)
