= 1895 in architecture =

List of years in architecture	(table)
- … 1885; 1886; 1887; 1888; 1889; 1890; 1891; 1892; 1893; 1894; 1895; 1896; 1897; 1898; 1899; 1900; 1901; 1902; 1903; 1904; 1905 …
- Buildings and structures: Art; Archaeology; Architecture; Literature; Music; Philosophy; Science; +...

The year 1895 in architecture involved some significant events.

== Events ==
- William Alexander Harvey, aged 20, is appointed architect for the newly laid-out model village of Bournville in Birmingham, England.

== Buildings and structures ==
=== Buildings ===
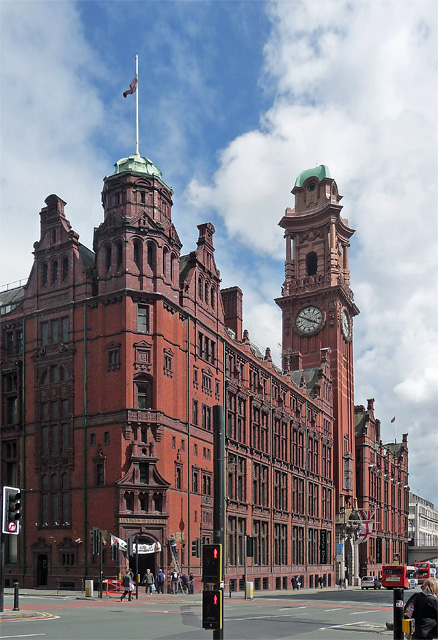
Refuge Assurance Building, Manchester

- Kaiser Wilhelm Memorial Church (Kaiser-Wilhelm-Gedächtniskirche), Berlin, Germany, by Franz Heinrich Schwechten, is consecrated.
- Holy Innocents Church, South Norwood, London, designed by George Frederick Bodley, is completed.
- Milwaukee City Hall in Milwaukee, Wisconsin, United States is completed, giving it the title of tallest building in the world until 1899.
- Biltmore House on Biltmore Estate in Asheville, North Carolina, United States, by Richard Morris Hunt is opened.
- Refuge Assurance Building in Manchester, England, by Alfred Waterhouse, is opened.
- Bishopsgate Institute in London, England, by Charles Harrison Townsend, is opened.
- New offices for The Glasgow Herald (now The Lighthouse) in Scotland, designed by John Keppie and worked on by Charles Rennie Mackintosh.
- Pera Palace Hotel in Constantinople.
- D.T. Porter Building, the first steel frame skyscraper in Memphis, Tennessee, is completed. Designed by E.C. Jones.
- The Breakers, the largest of the Gilded Age mansions in Newport, Rhode Island is completed. Designed by Richard Morris Hunt.

== Awards ==
- RIBA Royal Gold Medal – James Brooks.
- Grand Prix de Rome, architecture: René Patouillard-Demoriane.

== Births ==
- July 12 – Richard Buckminster Fuller, American architect (died 1983)
- September 28 – Wallace Harrison, American architect (died 1981)
- December 17 – Wells Coates, Japanese-born Canadian architect working in England (died 1958)

== Deaths ==
- April 23 – Francis Thompson, English architect working chiefly on railways (born 1808)
- June 23 – James Renwick Jr., American architect (born 1818)
