= 1732 in architecture =

The year 1732 in architecture involved some significant events.

== Buildings and structures ==
=== Buildings ===
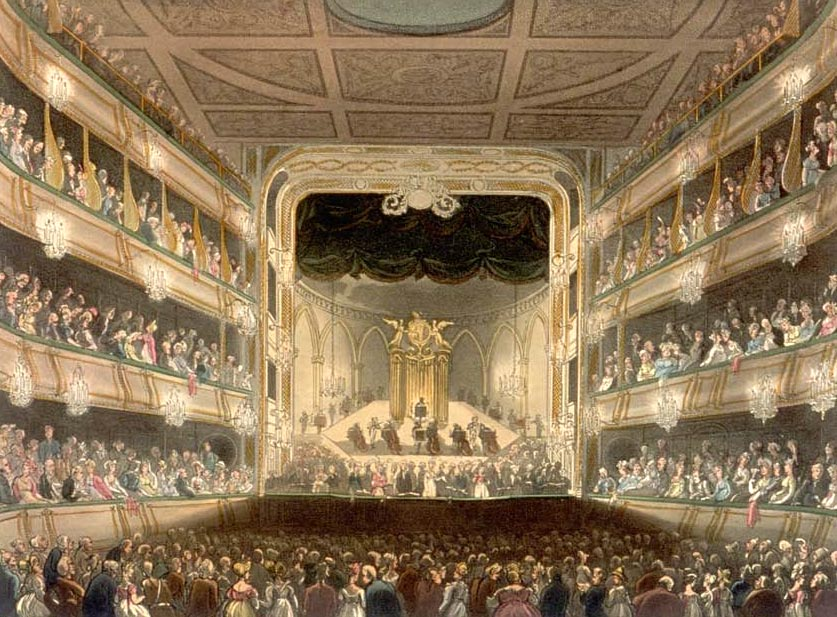
Theatre Royal, Covent Garden, London.

- August – York Assembly Rooms in England, designed by Lord Burlington, are opened. The Mansion House, York, is also completed this year.
- October 2 – Goodman's Fields Theatre, London, designed by Edward Shepherd, is opened.
- December 7 – Theatre Royal, Covent Garden, London, designed by Edward Shepherd, is opened.
- Trinity College Library in Dublin, designed by Thomas Burgh, is completed.
- Nicola Salvi begins work on the new Trevi Fountain in Rome.
- Work on Palais Rohan in Strasbourg, designed by Robert de Cotte, is started

== Awards ==
- Prix de Rome, architecture: Jean-Laurent Legeay.

== Births ==
- April 22 – John Johnson, English architect (died 1814)
- July 21 – James Adam, Scottish-born architect (died 1794)
- December 15 – Carl Gotthard Langhans, Prussian architect (died 1808)

== Deaths ==
- Giacomo Amato, Sicilian architect (born 1643)
