= 1734 in architecture =

== Buildings and structures ==
=== Buildings ===
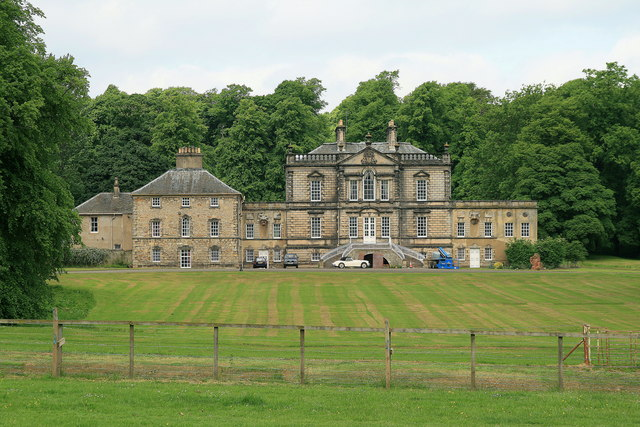
The Drum

- The Drum, Edinburgh, designed by William Adam.
- Loboc Church, Philippines.
- Louisbourg Lighthouse, Nova Scotia.
- Potsdam Gate, Berlin.
- San Giuseppe alla Lungara, Rome, designed by Ludovico Rusconi Sassi.
- Schloss Nordkirchen, North Rhine-Westphalia.
- Sivasagar Sivadol Hindu temples, Sivasagar, Assam.
- Rebuilding of Wentworth Woodhouse in the north of England begins.

== Publications ==
- Palladio Londinensis: or, The London art of building.

== Births ==
- May 7 – James Byres, Scottish architect (d. 1817)
- July 18 – Giuseppe Piermarini, Italian architect (d. 1808)
- October 6 (bapt.) – Joseph Pickford, English architect (d. 1782)
- William Buckland, English-born American architect (d. 1774)

== Deaths ==
- March 1 – Roger North, English lawyer, biographer and amateur of the arts (b. 1651)
- May – Alexander McGill, Scottish architect (b. c.1680)
- William Etty, English architect (b. c.1675)
