= D.T. Porter Building =

- Dr. D. T. Porter Building
- U.S. National Register of Historic Places
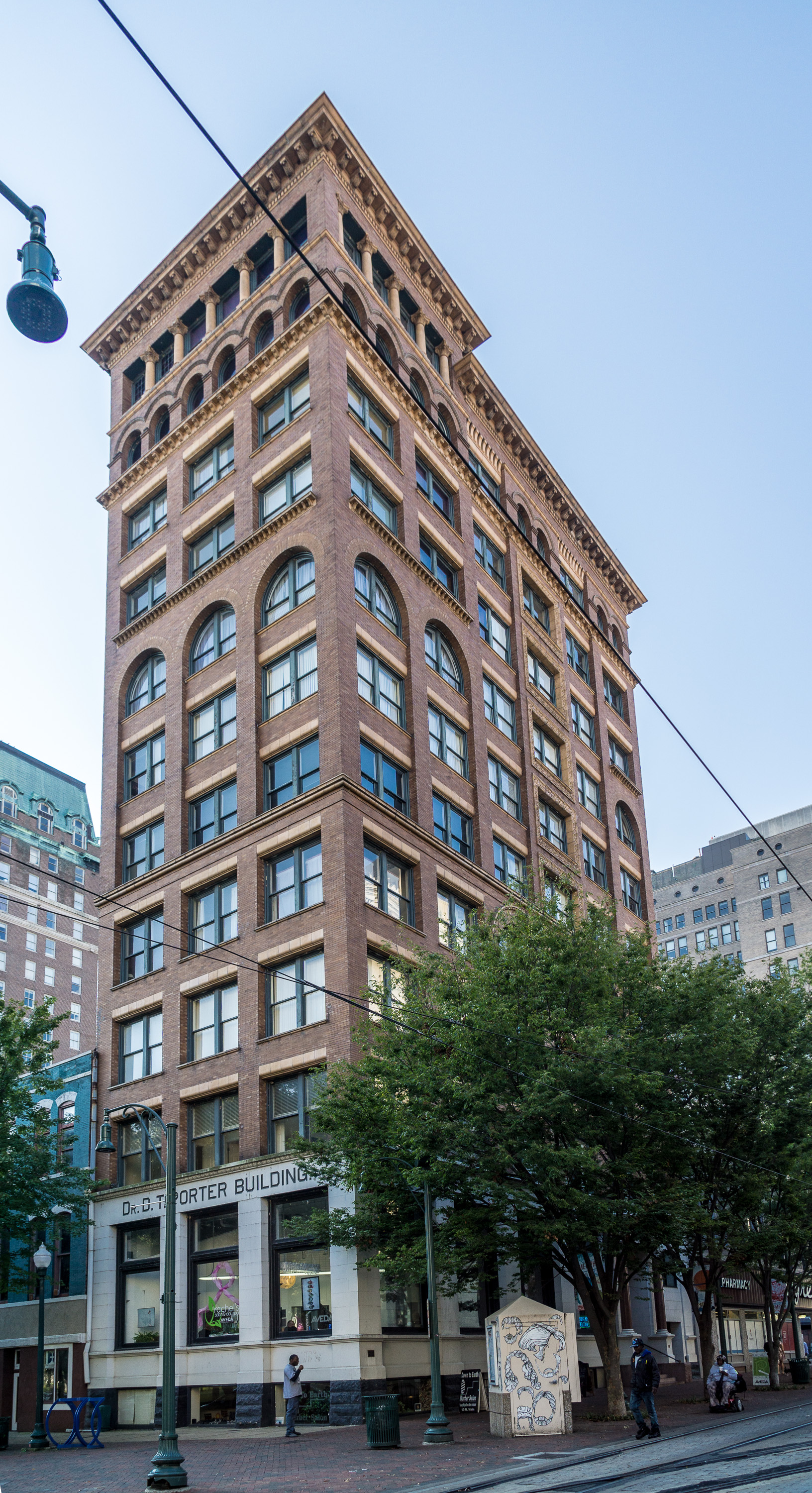

- Location within Tennessee Location within the United States
- Location: 10 N. Main St., Memphis, Tennessee
- Coordinates: 35°8′43″N 90°3′8″W
- Area: 0.5 acres (0.20 ha)
- Built: 1895
- Architect: Jones, Hain & Kirby
- Architectural style: Romanesque revival
- NRHP reference No.: 77001291
- Added to NRHP: April 18, 1977

The D.T. Porter Building in Memphis, Tennessee, was constructed in 1895 and was the city's first steel frame skyscraper. It had a circulating hot water heating system. It was renovated in 1983 and converted to condominiums. It was listed on the National Register of Historic Places for Shelby County, Tennessee, in 1995. It was designed by Edward Culliatt Jones's architecture firm.

== See also ==
- National Register of Historic Places listings in Shelby County, Tennessee
