= Carl Gotthard Langhans =

Prussian builder and architect (1732–1808)

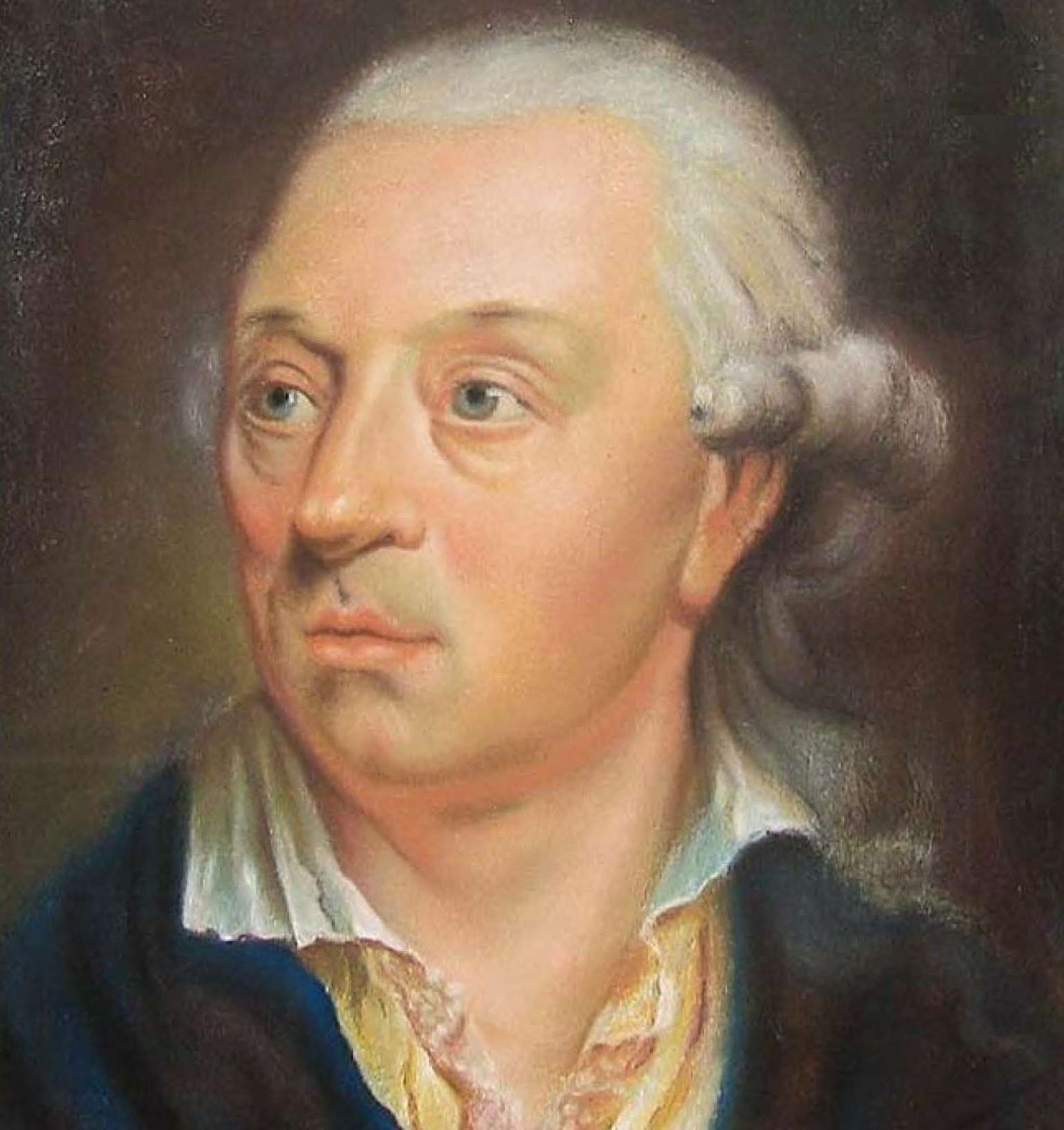
Carl Gotthard Langhans Signature Carl Gotthard Langhans (1732-1808)

Carl Gotthard Langhans (15 December 1732 – 1 October 1808) was a Prussian master builder and royal architect. His churches, palaces, grand houses, interiors, city gates and theatres in Silesia, Berlin, Potsdam and elsewhere belong to the earliest examples of Neoclassical architecture in Germany. His best-known work is the Brandenburg Gate in Berlin, national symbol of today’s Germany and German reunification in 1989/90.

== Life ==
Langhans was born in Landeshut, Silesia (now Kamienna Góra in Poland). He was not educated as an architect. He studied law from 1753 to 1757 in Halle, and then mathematics and languages, and engaged himself autodidactically with architecture, at which he concentrated primarily on the antique texts of the Roman architecture theorist Vitruvius (and the new version by the classics enthusiast Johann Joachim Winckelmann whose works prompted the Greek Revival).

His draft for "Zum Schifflein Christi" (1764), the Protestant Church in Groß-Glogau, earned him his first recognition as an architect. In the same year, he received an appointment as building inspector for the Count of Hatzfeld, whose war-ravaged palace Langhans rebuilt to his own design between 1766 and 1774. Through the intervention of the Count of Hatzfeld, he also became known in the royal court in Berlin. As his first work in the service of the royal family, he built in 1766 the stairwell and the Muschelsaal in Rheinsberg Palace.

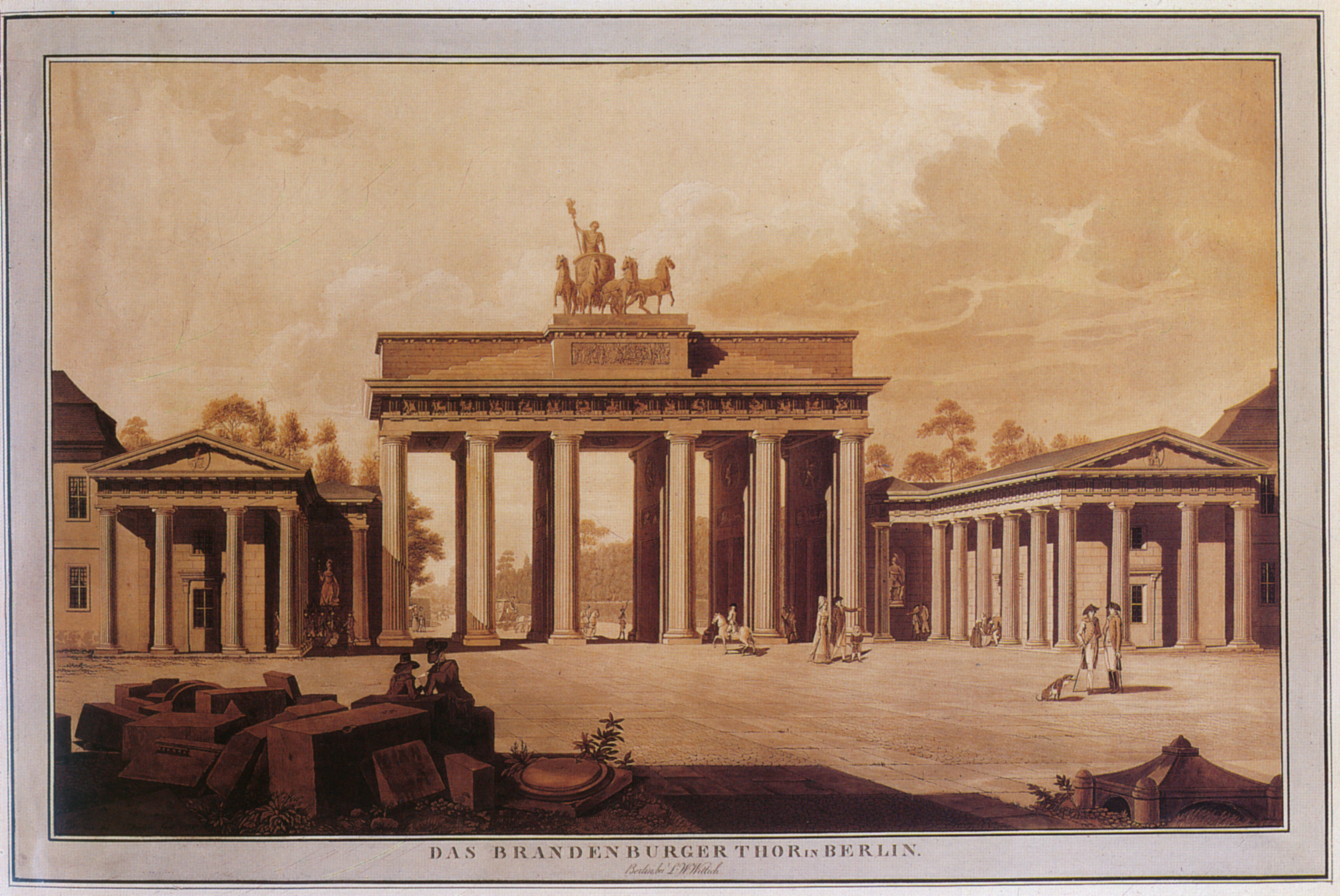
The Brandenburg Gate in 1796

From 1775 until 1788, Langhans headed the building authority for the Prussian province of Silesia. In 1788, King Frederick William II of Prussia appointed him as first director of the royal building commission in Berlin. He immediately commissioned him with a draft for the Brandenburg Gate, which was built accordingly between 1788 and 1791, replacing the earlier simple guardhouses which flanked the original gate in the Customs Wall. Its design is based on the Propylaea, the gateway to the Acropolis in Athens, Greece. The Greek Revival architecture had been prompted by the research and publications of classics enthusiast Johann Joachim Winckelmann.

Another influential late classicist architect was David Gilly, an architectural advisor in the Royal Building Department, who was younger than Langhans and overtook him in terms of modernity, but did not outlive him, leaving a considerably smaller life's work. Gilly was a teacher of the young Karl Friedrich Schinkel who would dominate the next generation of Prussian architects.

Langhans died on his estate at Grüneiche (Dąbie after 1945 and part of Śródmieście borough of Wrocław) near Breslau.

== Family ==
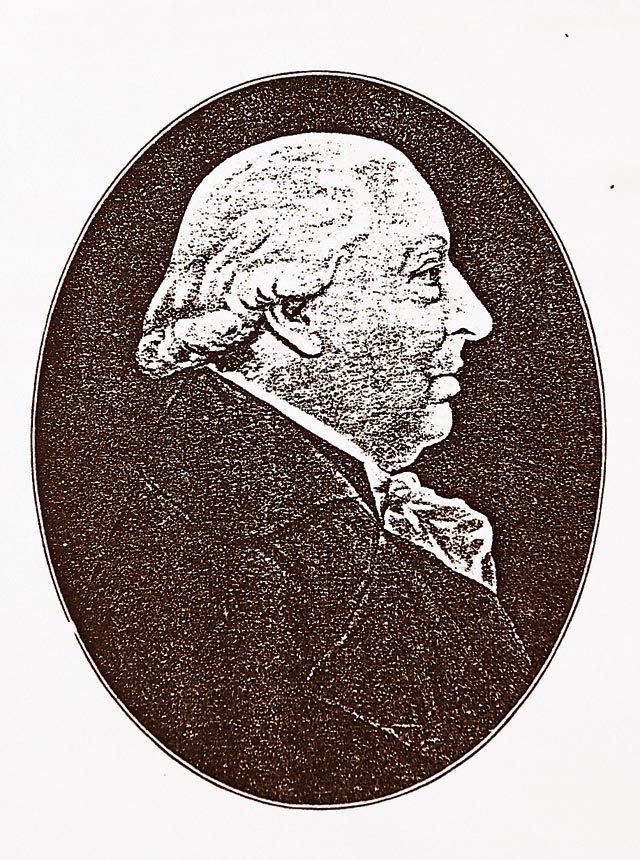
Carl Gotthard Langhans at old age

In 1771, Langhans married Anna Elisabeth Jaeckel, the daughter of a jurist in Breslau. They had five children: daughters Louise Amalie and Juliane Wilhelmine, a son, theater architect Carl Ferdinand, as well as two other children, who died soon after birth.

From 1782 he lived with his family in his in-laws' house at Albrechtstraße 18 in Breslau. In 1788, they moved to Berlin, where he built his own house and lived at Charlottenstraße 31 (now 48), at the corner of Behrenstraße.

== Study trips ==
Toward the end of the 18th century and the beginning of the 19th century, it was a great dream for every artist to undertake a trip to Italy in order to be able to study the antique buildings with one's own eyes. The fulfillment of this dream was not granted only to Goethe and Schinkel, but Langhans, too, was able to afford a trip in 1768 and 1769 thanks to the support of the Count of Hatzfeld. When he was later assigned to be the head of the Breslau war and dominion chamber, he visited England, Holland, Belgium, and France on behalf of and at the expense of the king.

== Images of works ==
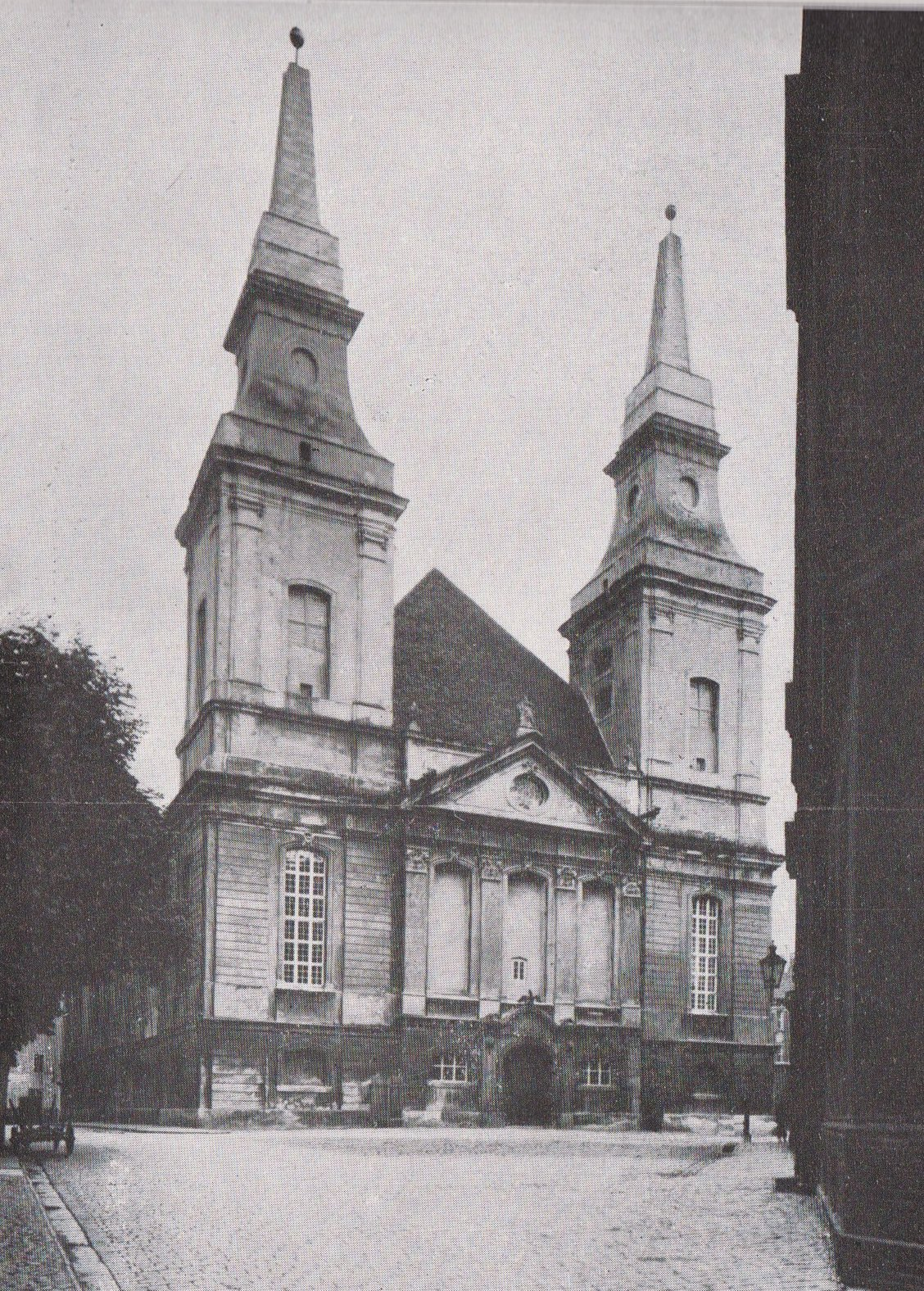
Głogów, Lutheran church (1764)

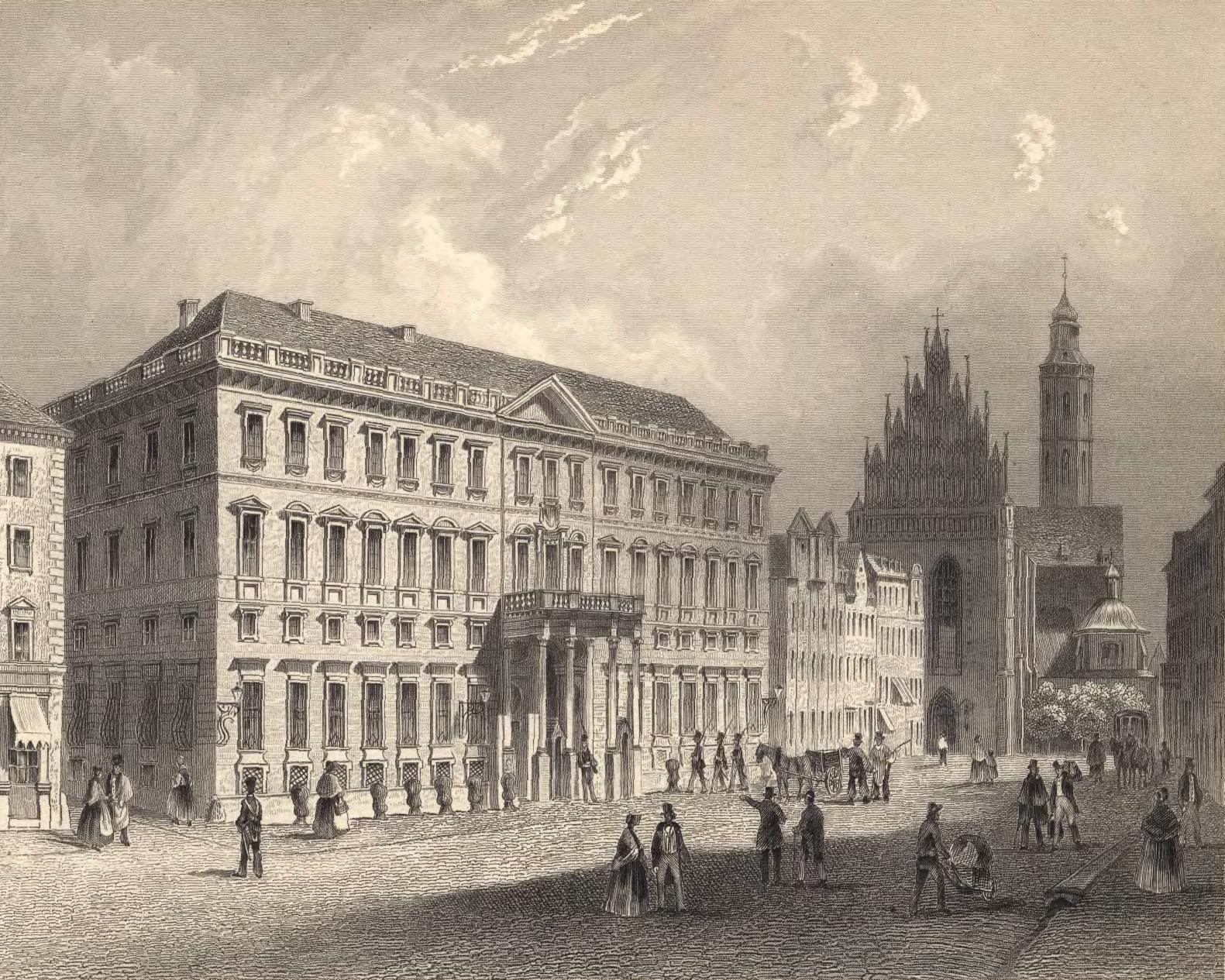
Wrocław (Breslau) Palais Hatzfeld (1765)

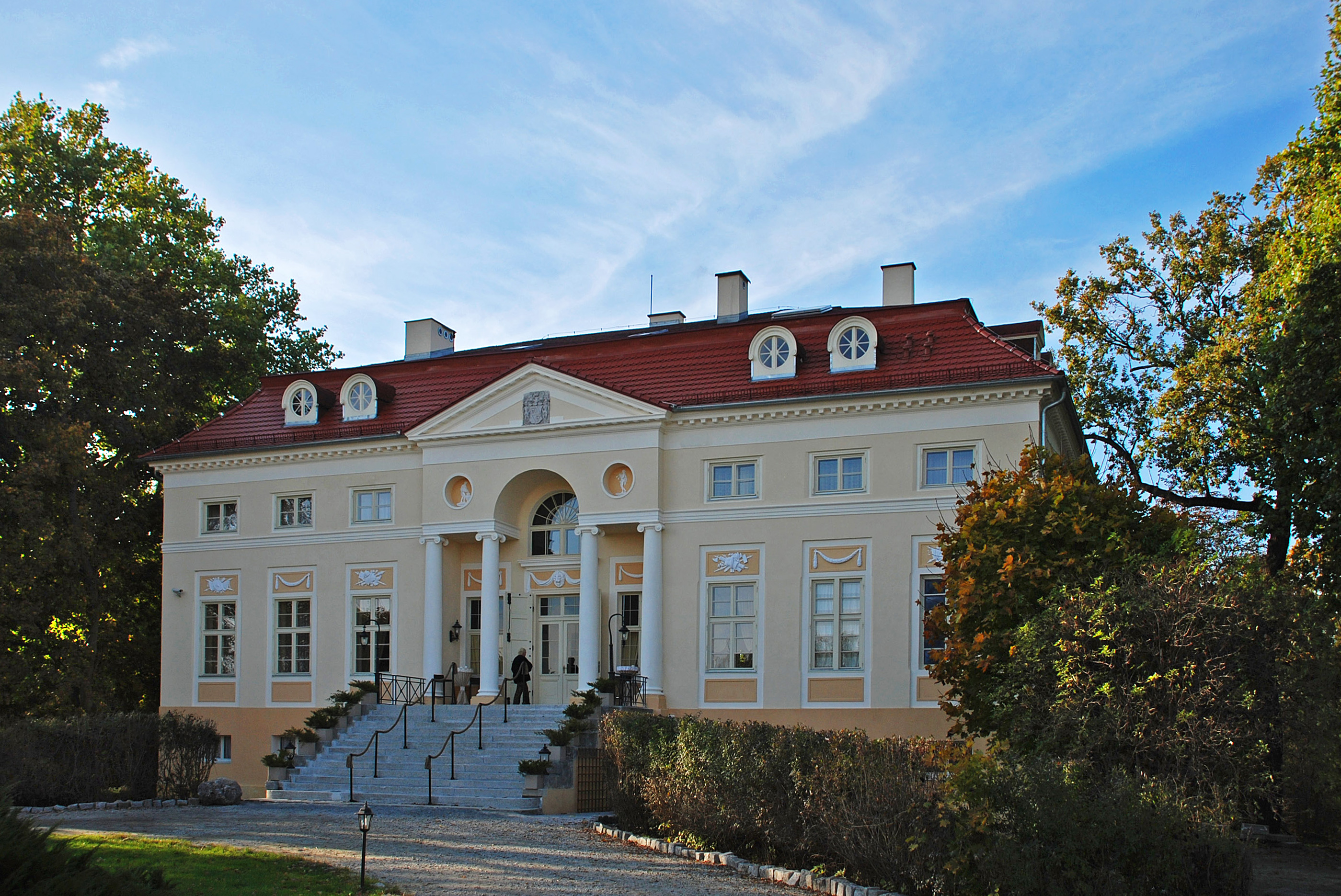
Schloss Romberg, Silesia (1776)

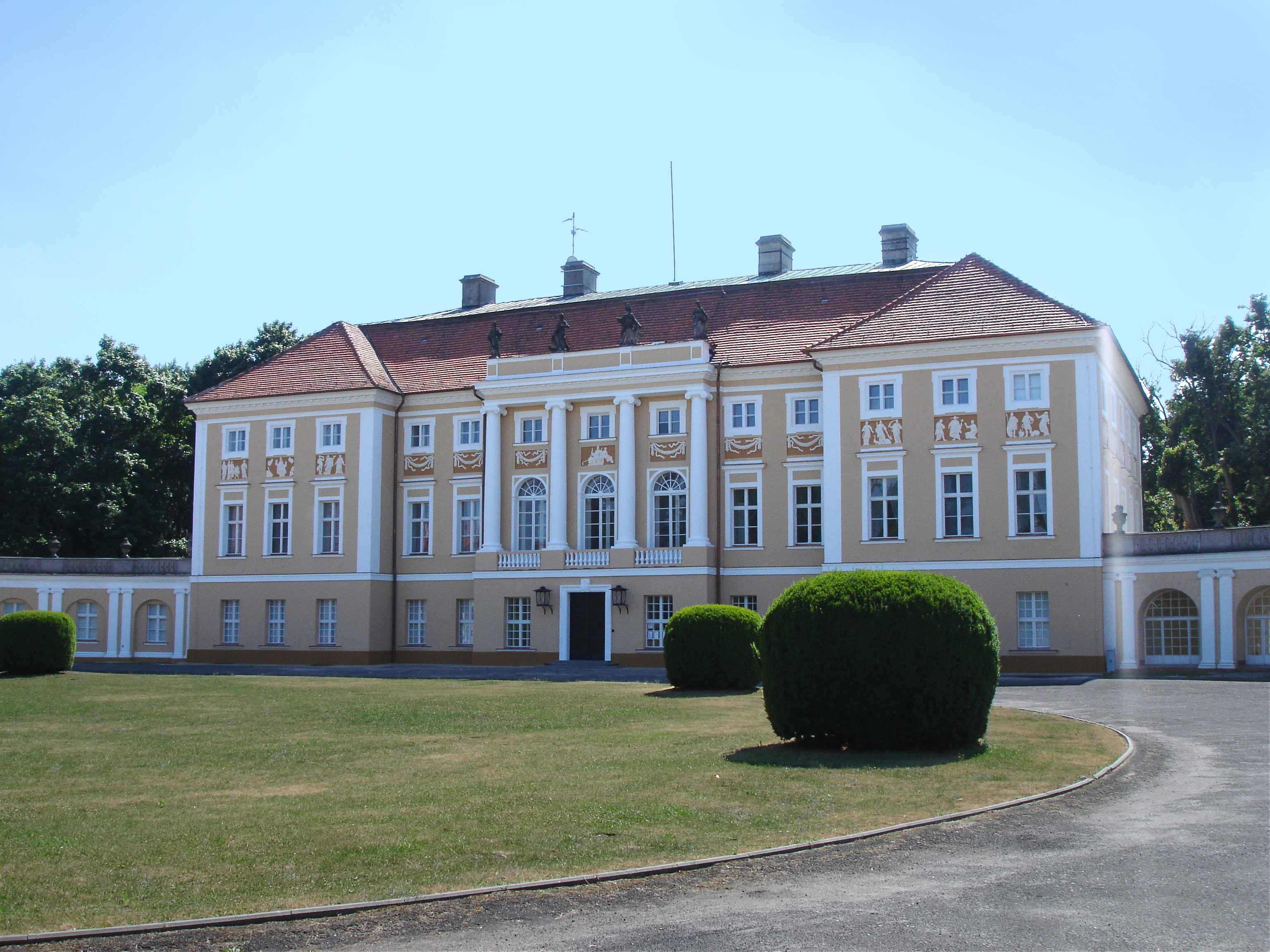
Mielżyński Palace, Poland (1778)

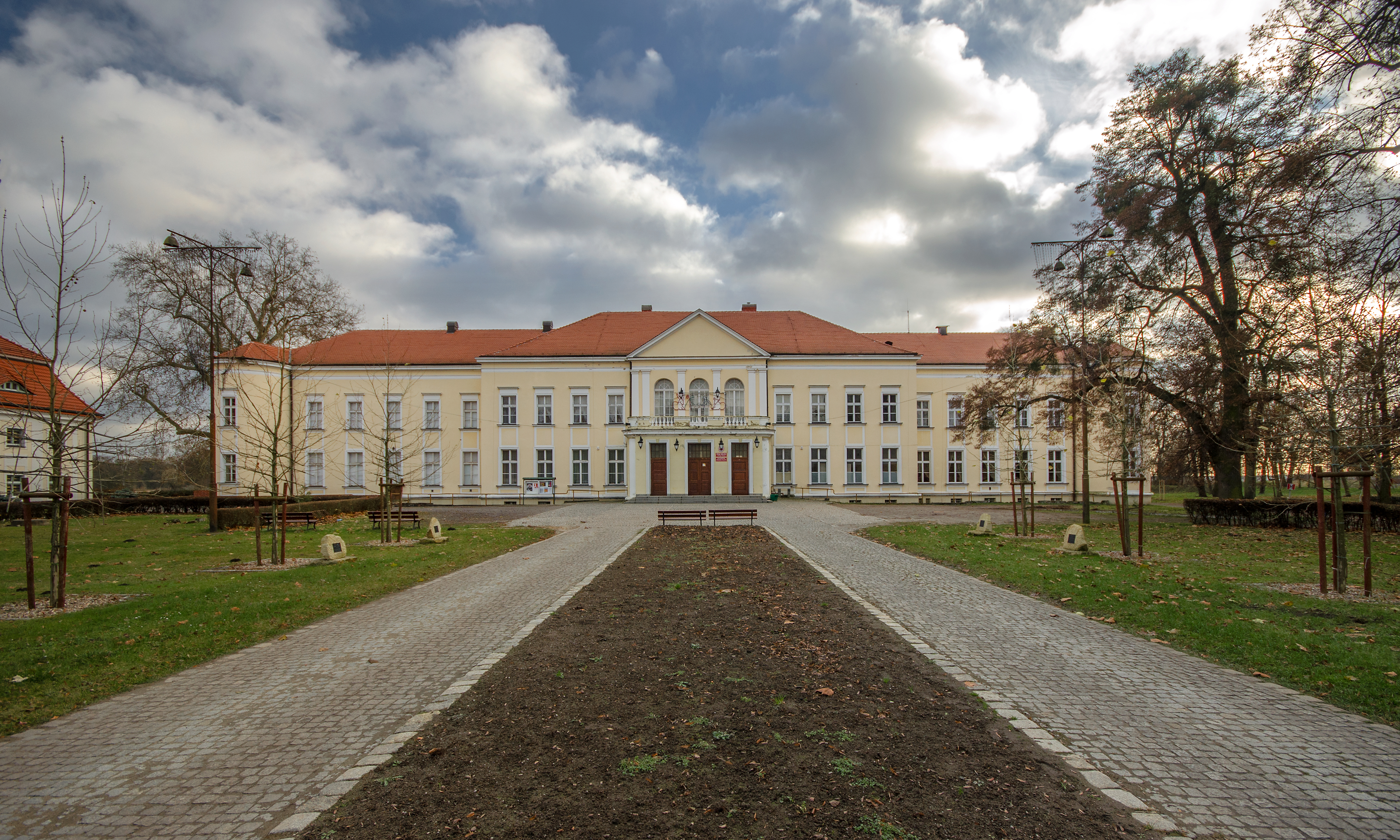
Schloss Dyhernfurth (1780–1785)

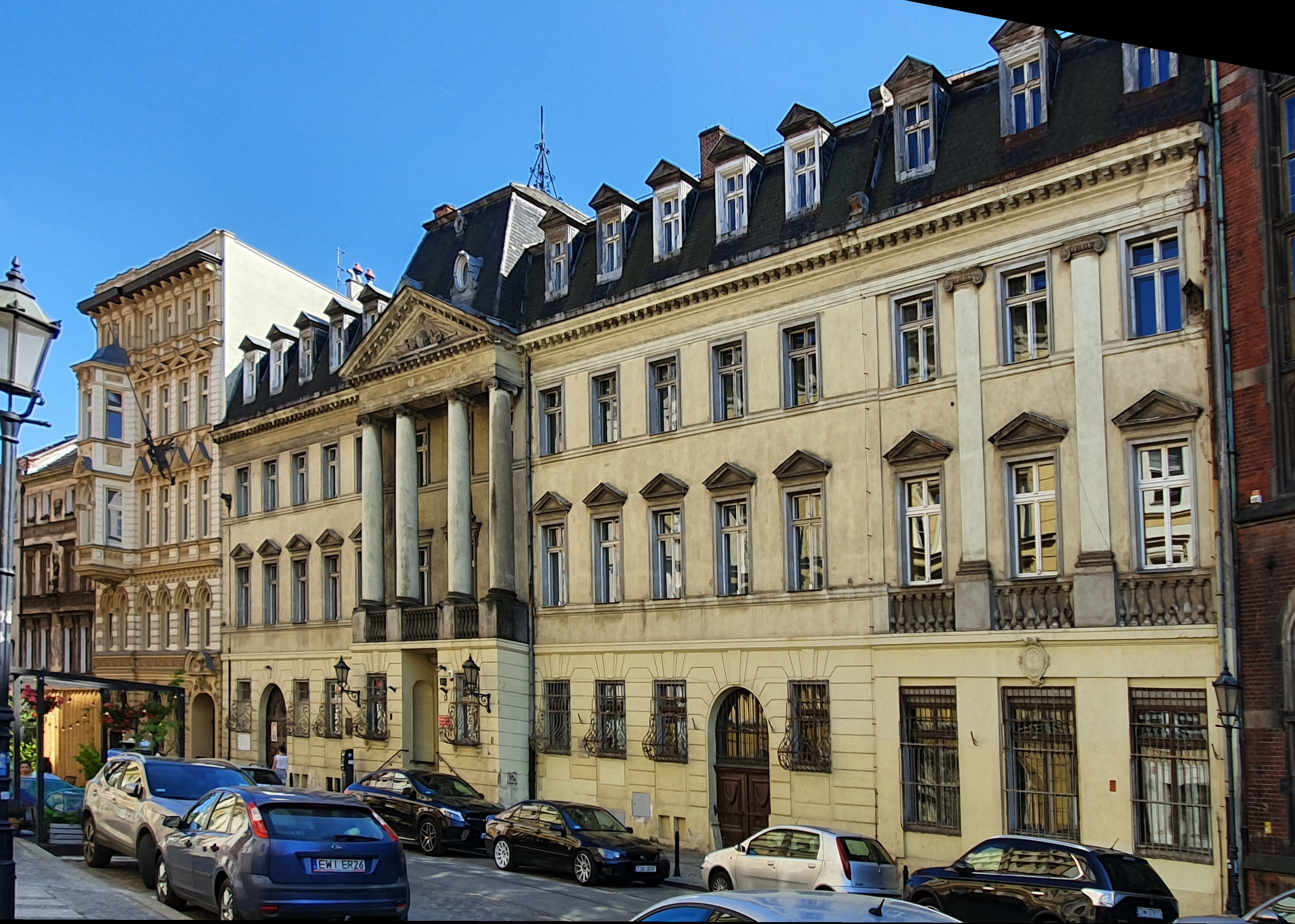
Wallenberg-Pachaly Palais, Breslau (1785)

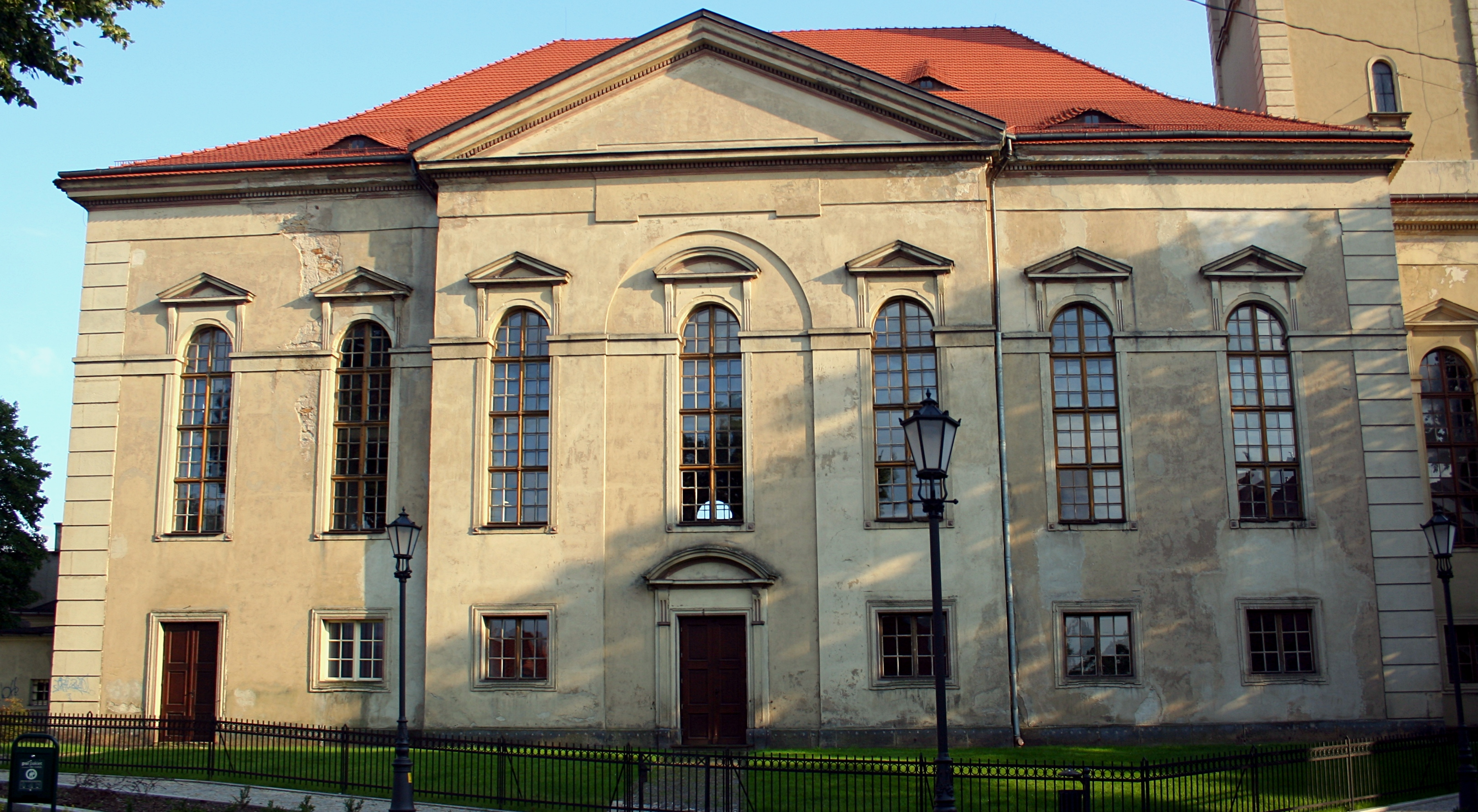
Lutheran Church in Waldenburg (1785)

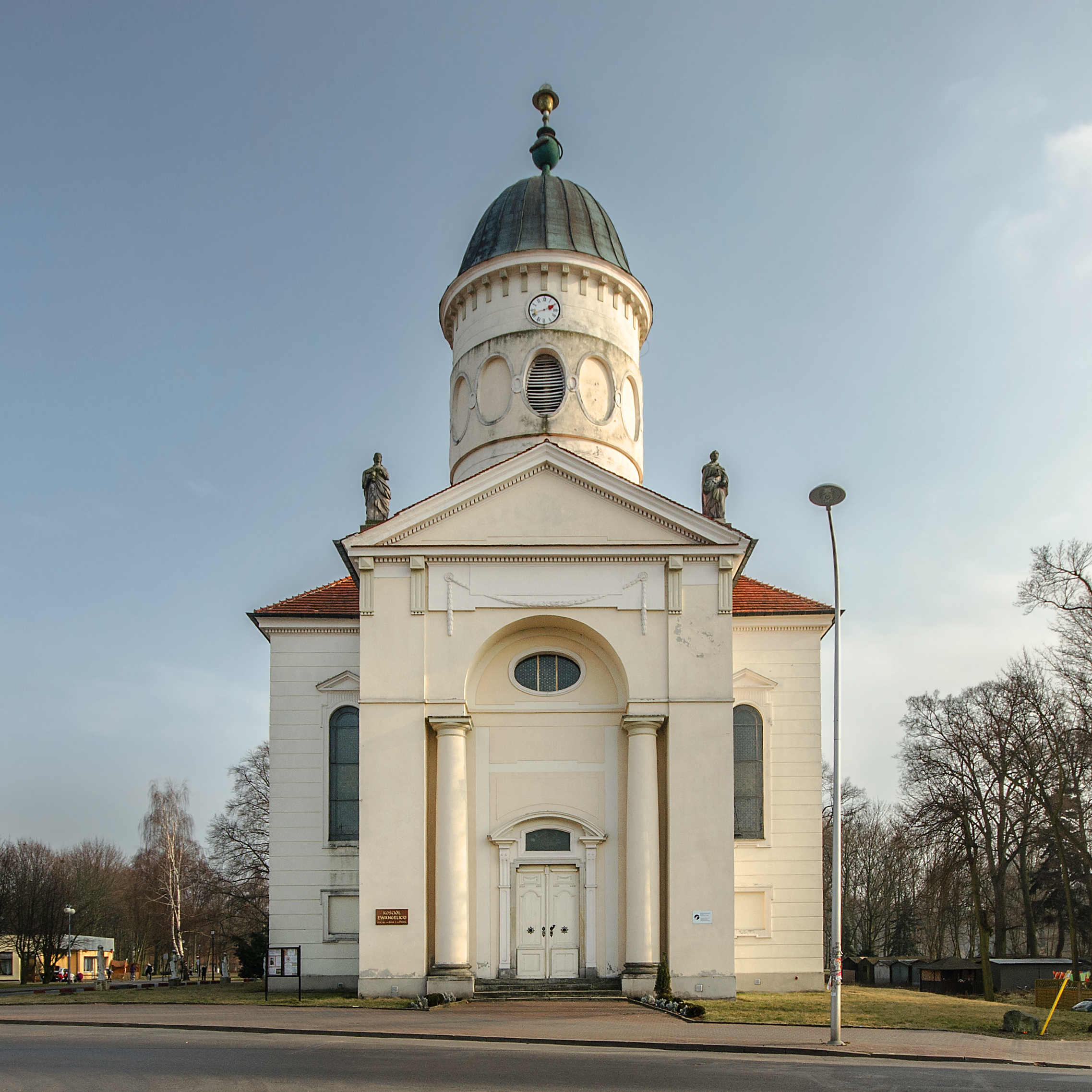
Lutheran Church in Syców (1785)

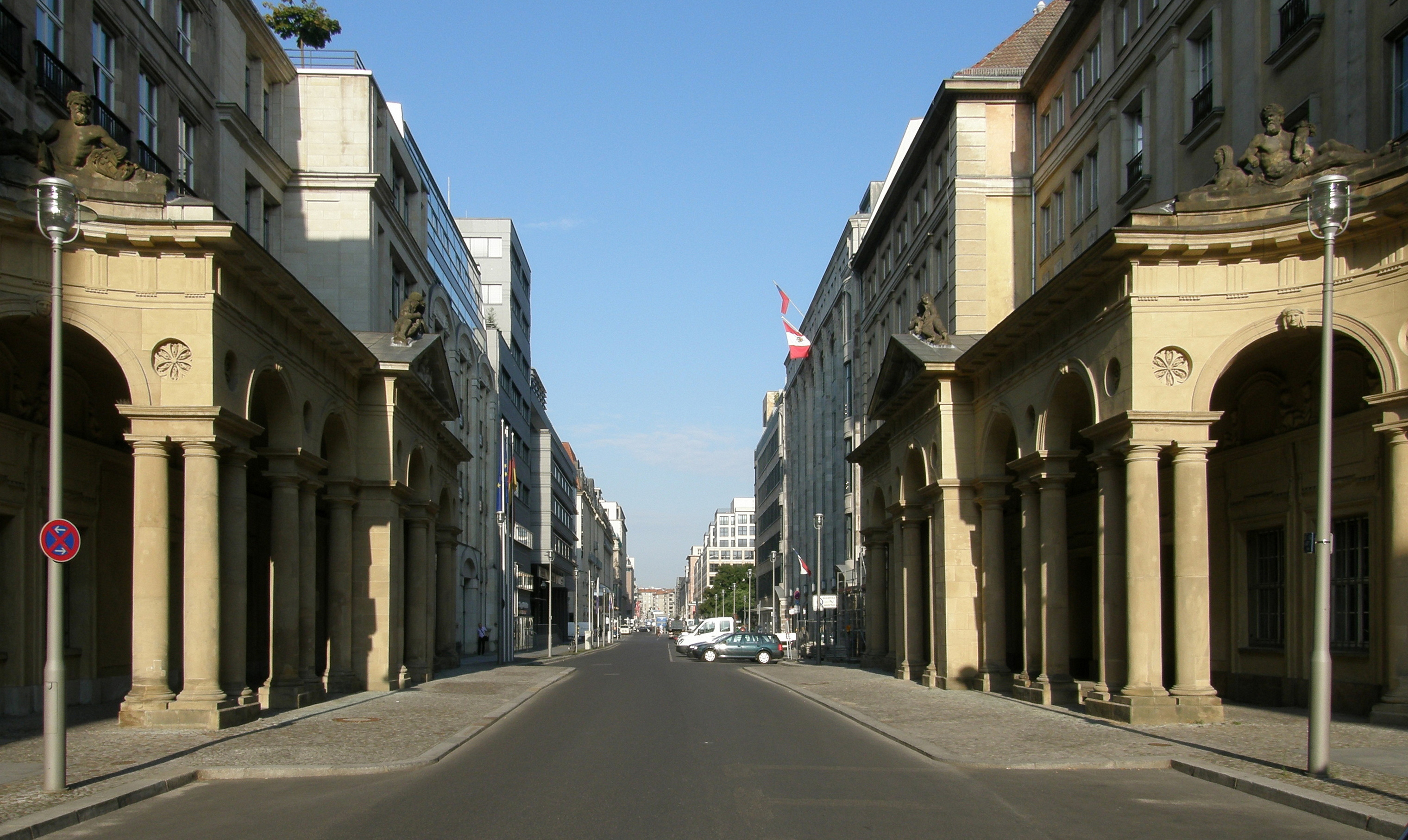
Mohrenkolonnaden at Mohrenstraße, Berlin (1787)

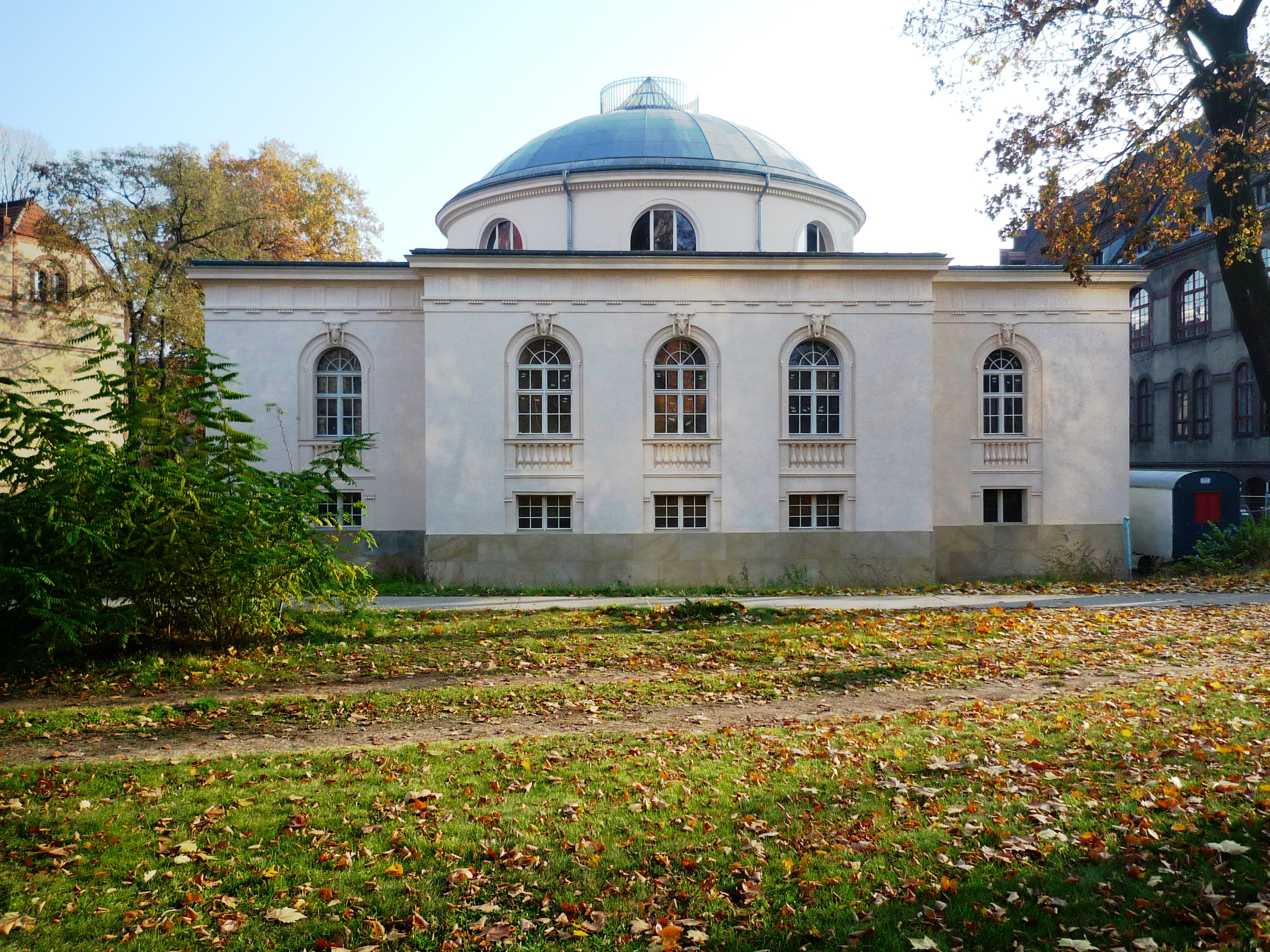
Anatomical theater of the veterinary school, Berlin (1787)

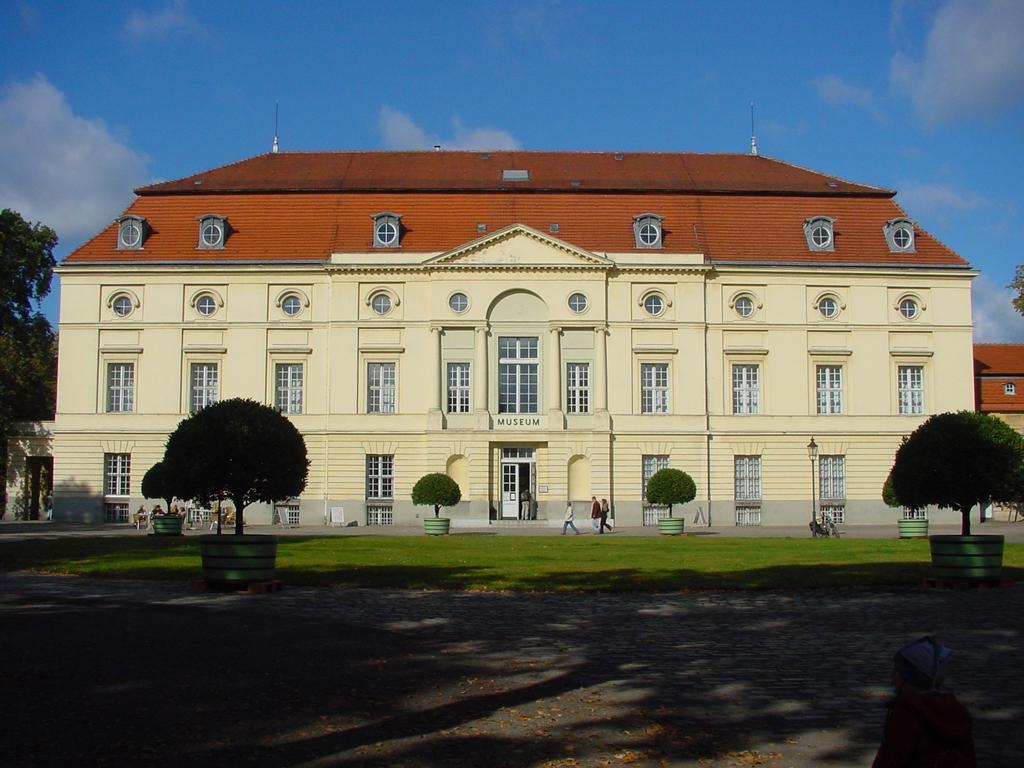
Theater building of Schloss Charlottenburg, Berlin (1787)

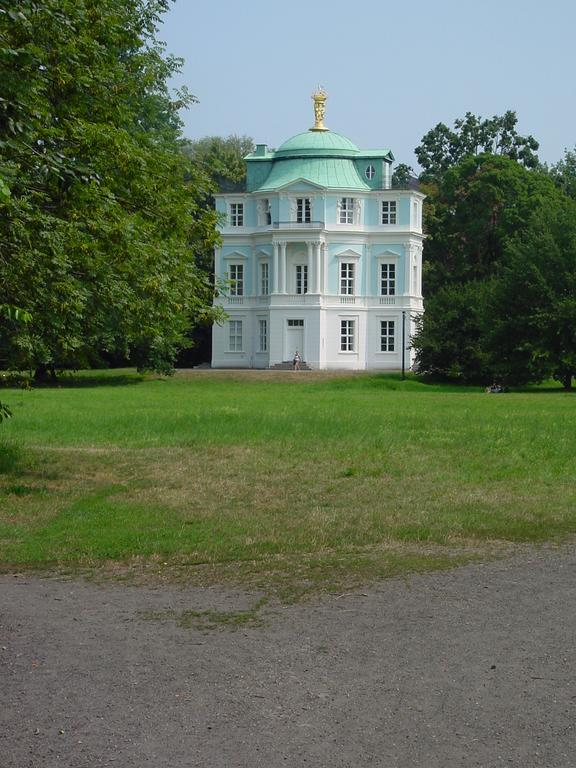
Belvedere at Charlottenburg (1788)

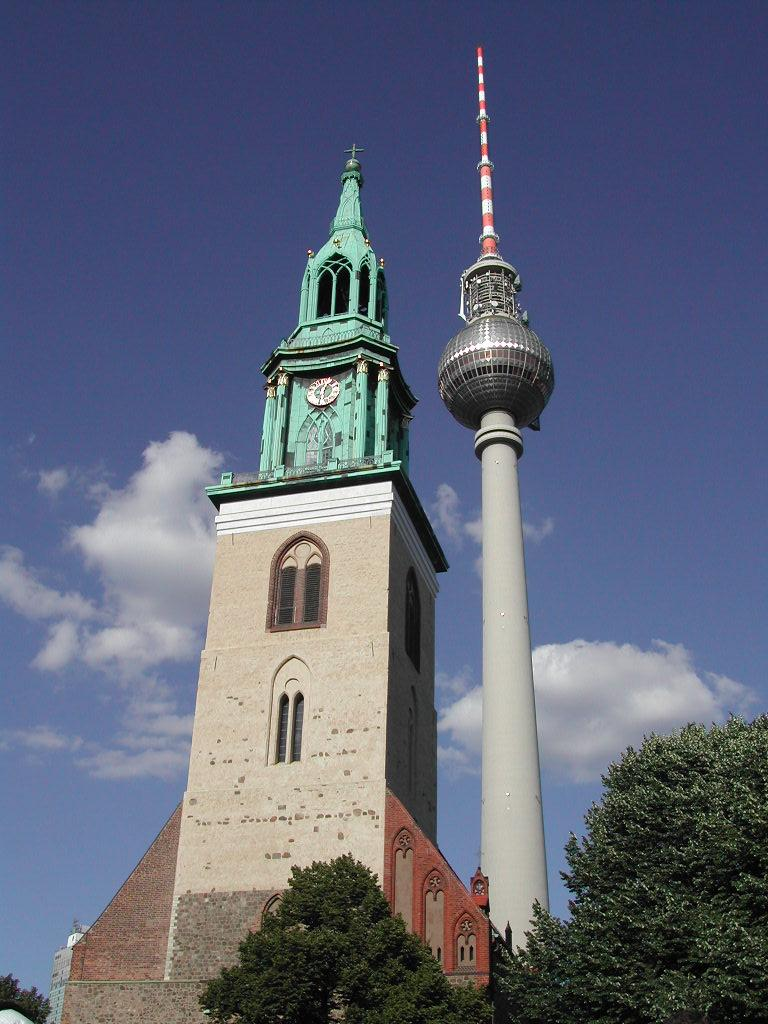
Spire of St. Mary's Church, Berlin (1789)

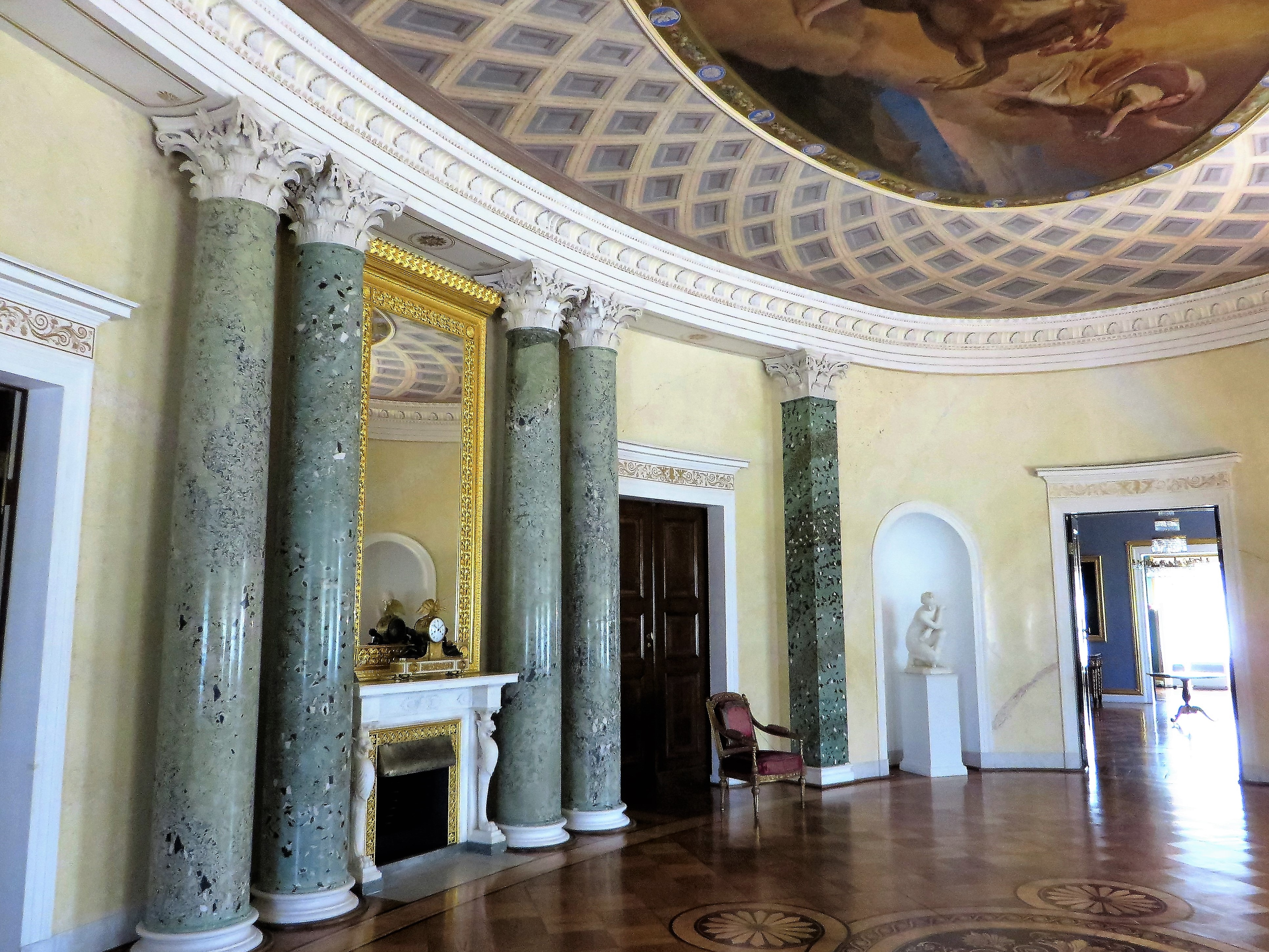
Oval Room at Marmorpalais, Potsdam (1789)

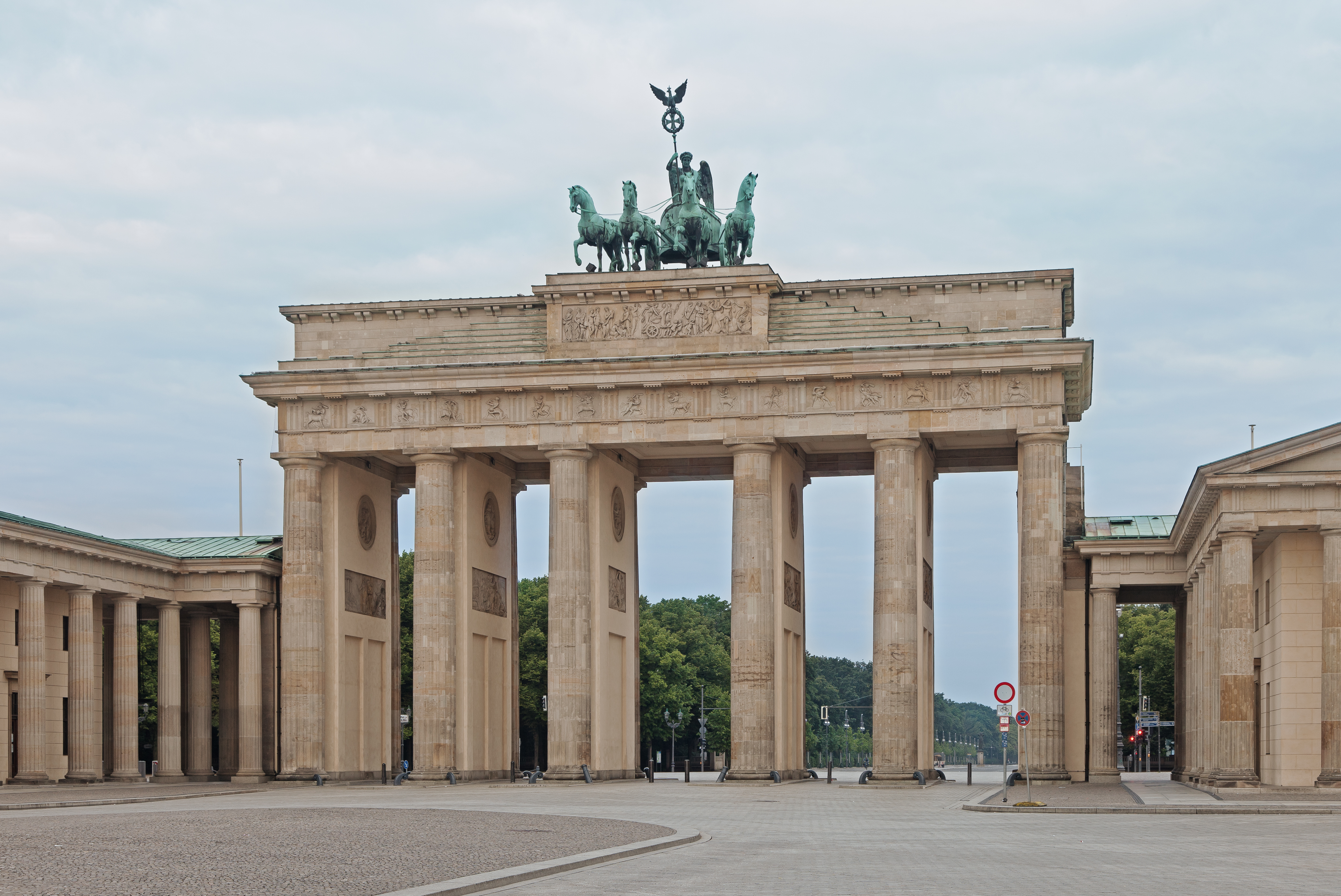
Brandenburger Tor in Berlin (1789)

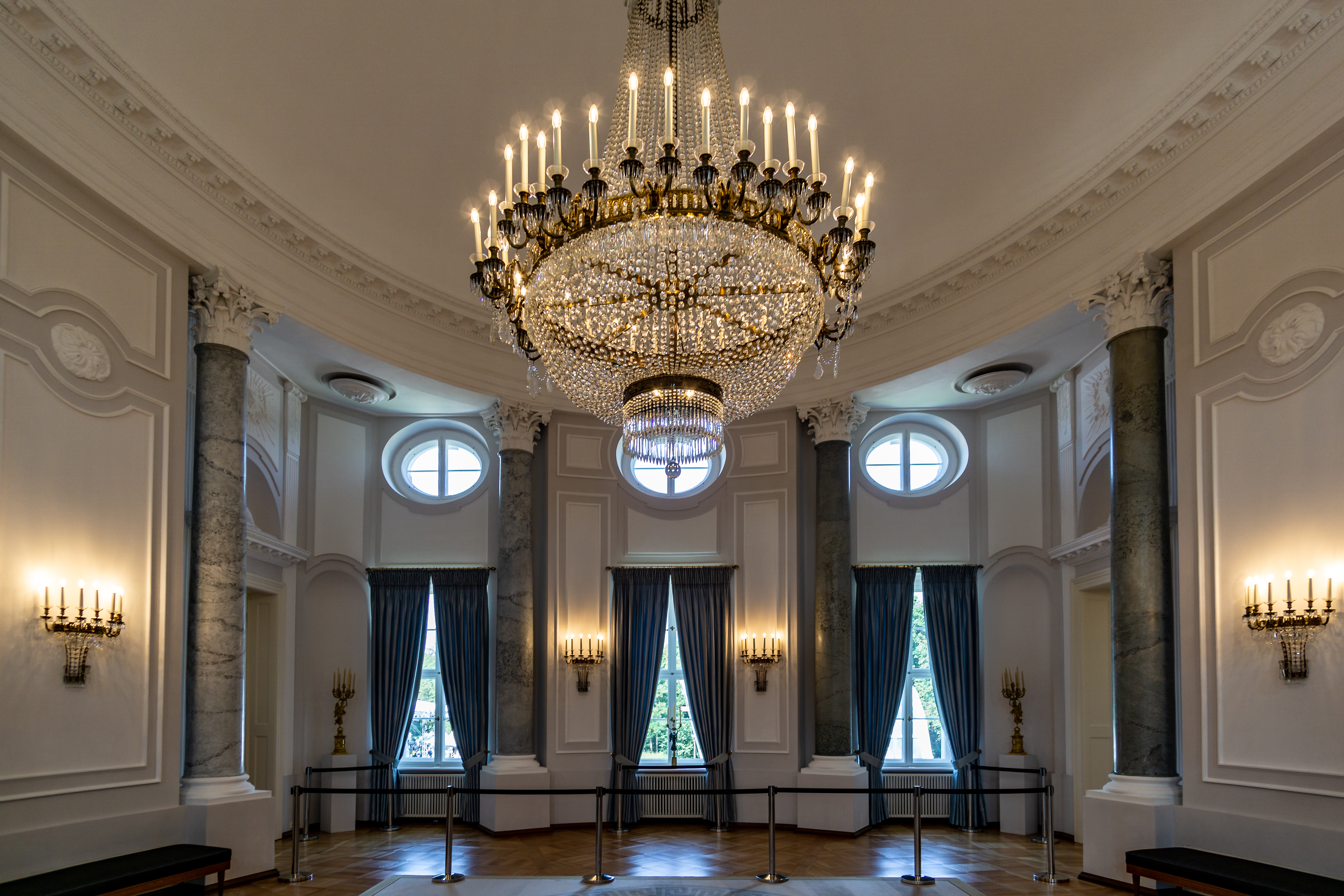
Oval Ballroom at Bellevue Palace, Berlin (1790)

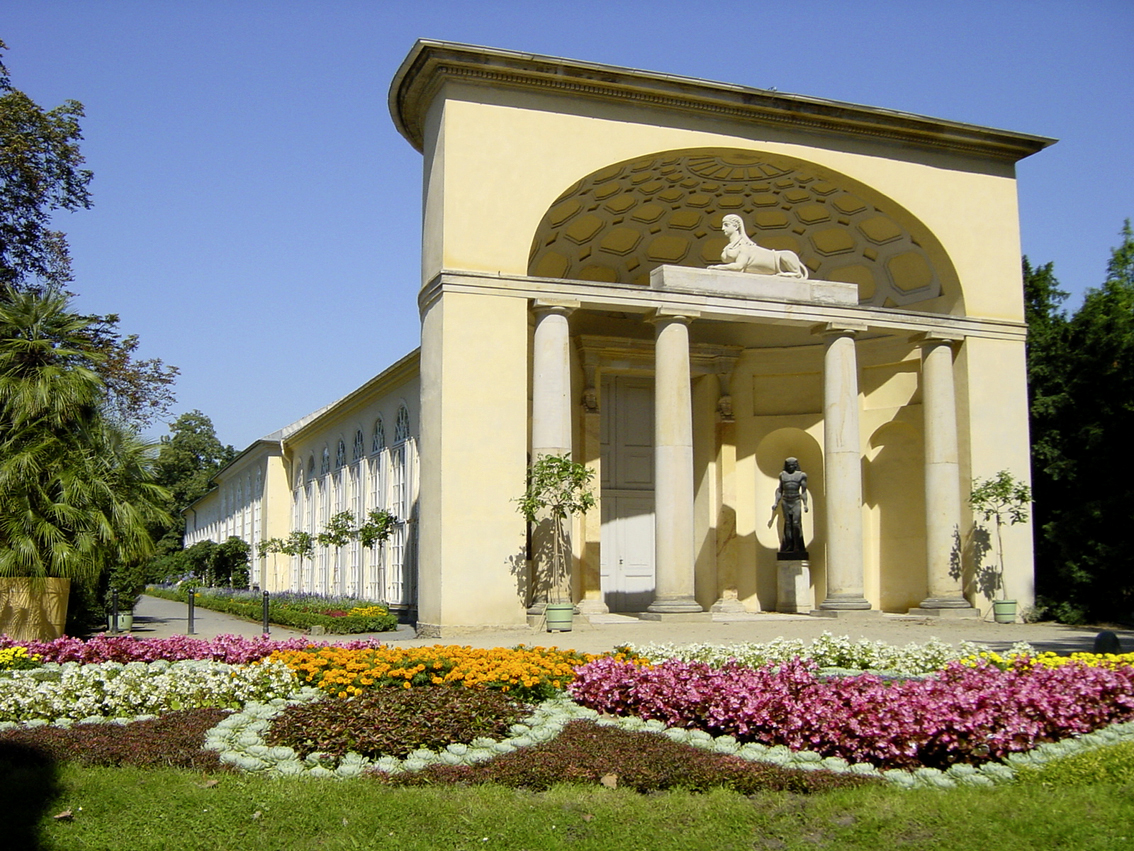
Orangery in the New Garden, Potsdam (1791–93)

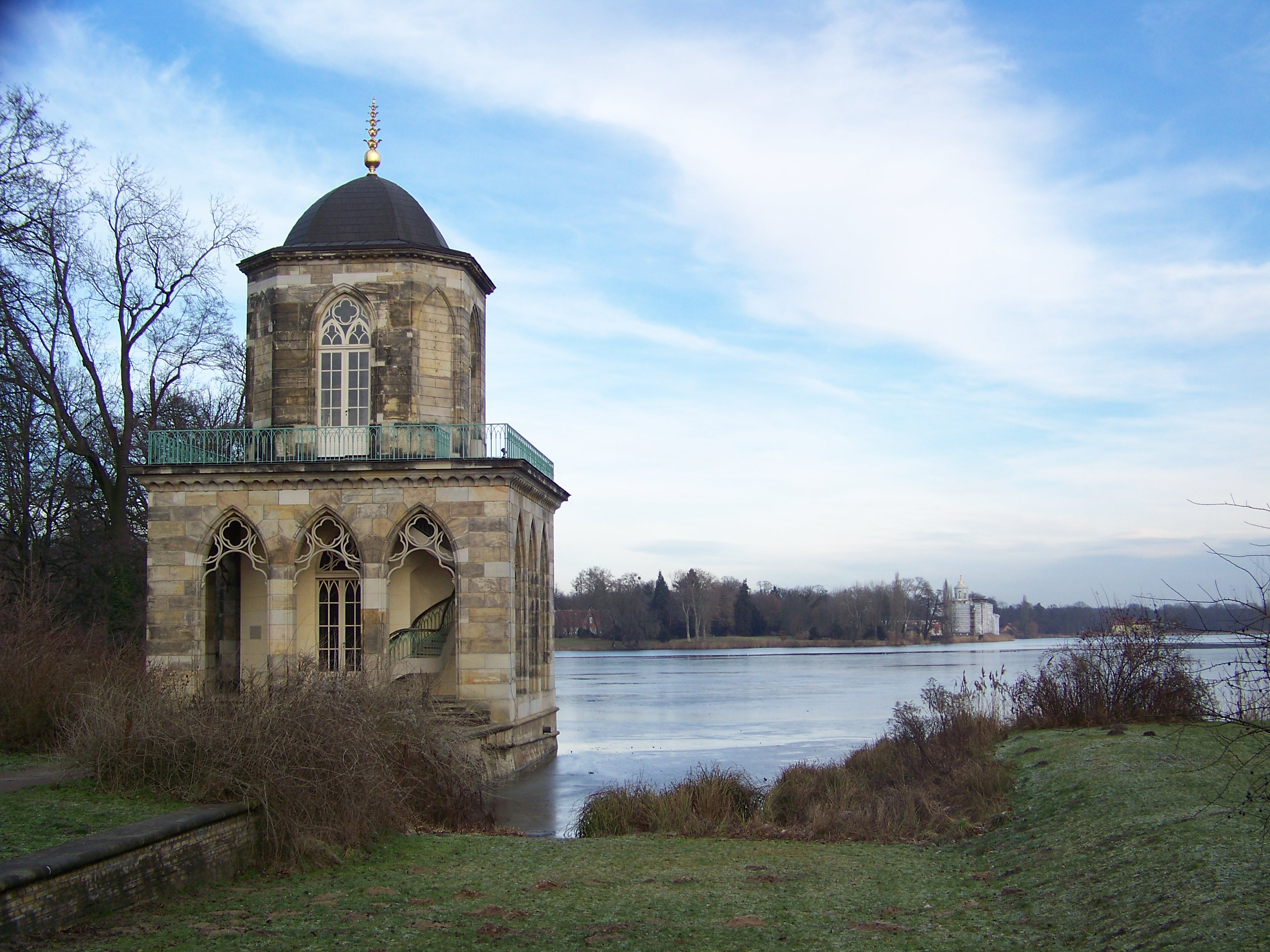
Gothic Library in the New Garden (1792–94)

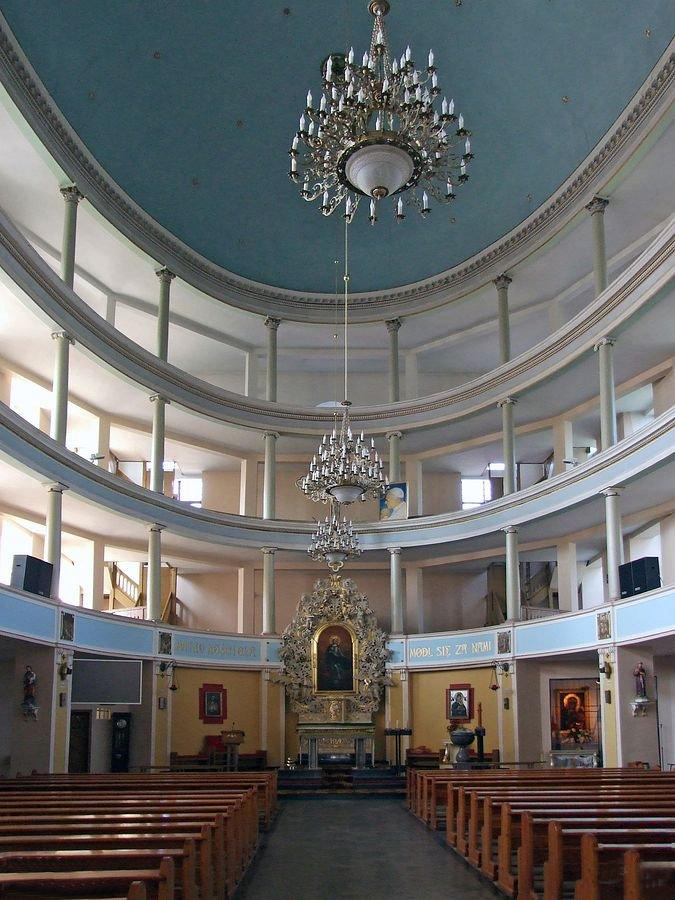
Lutheran Church in Reichenbach (1795)

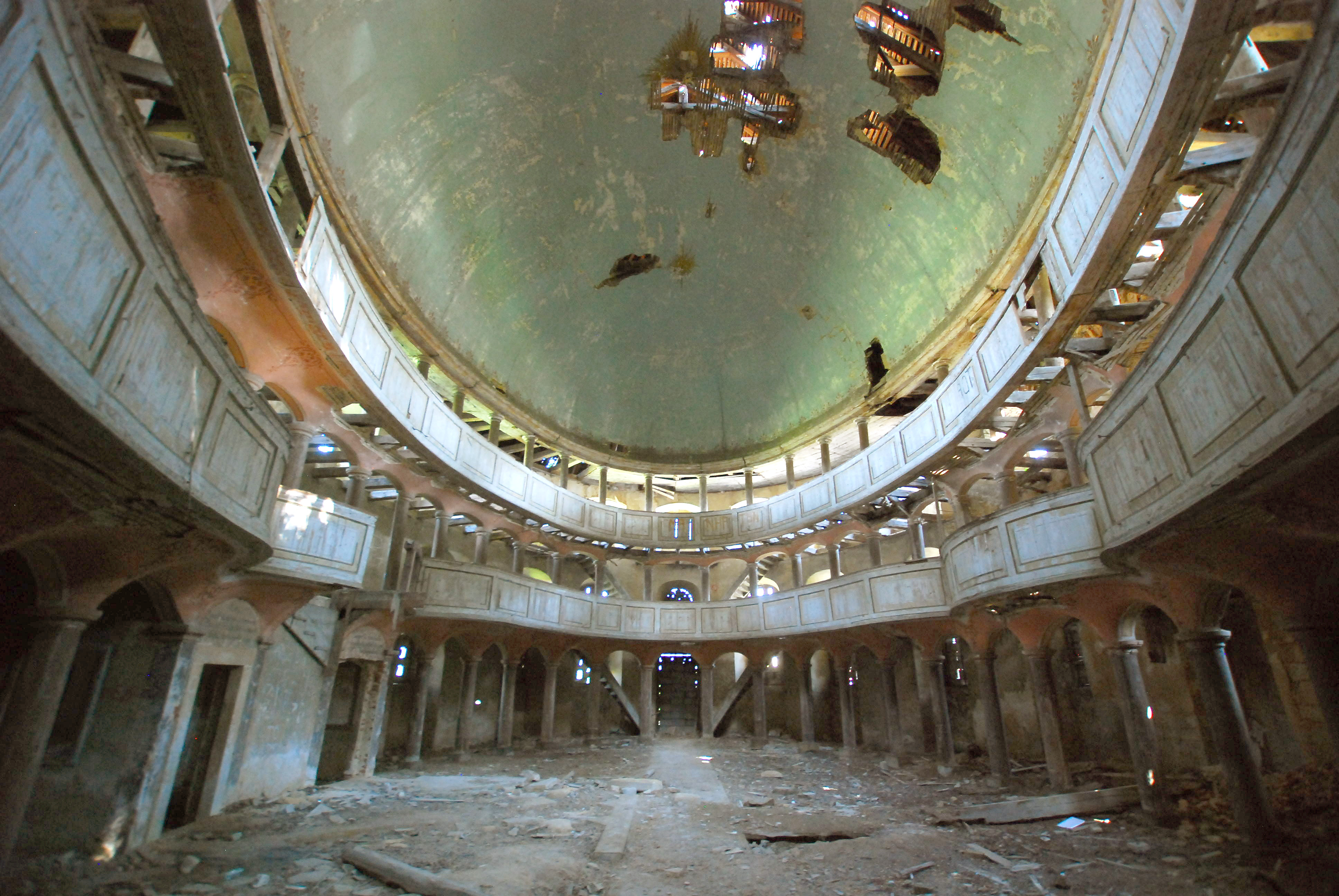
Lutheran Church in Giersdorf (1796)

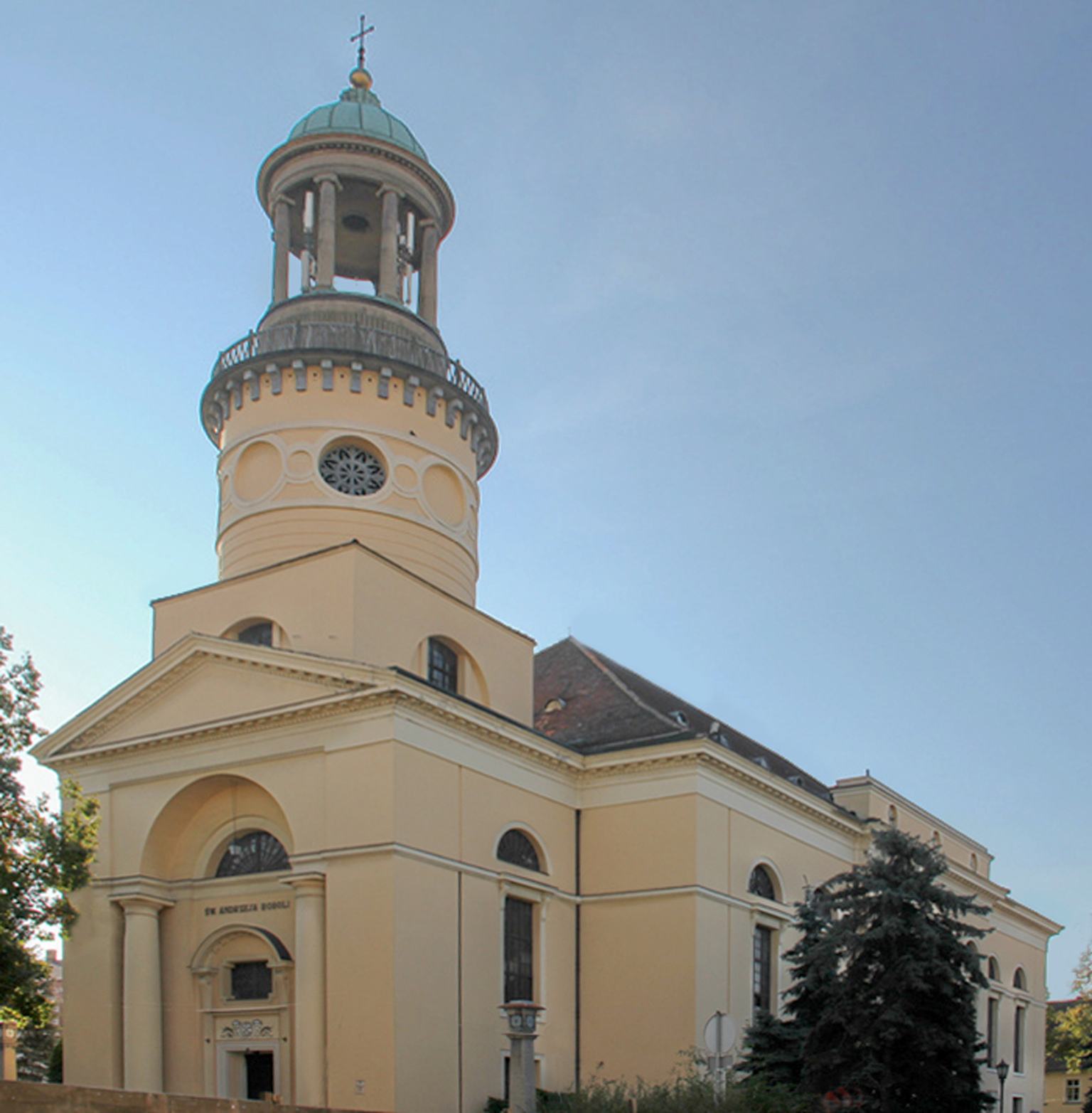
Lutheran Church in Rawicz (1802)

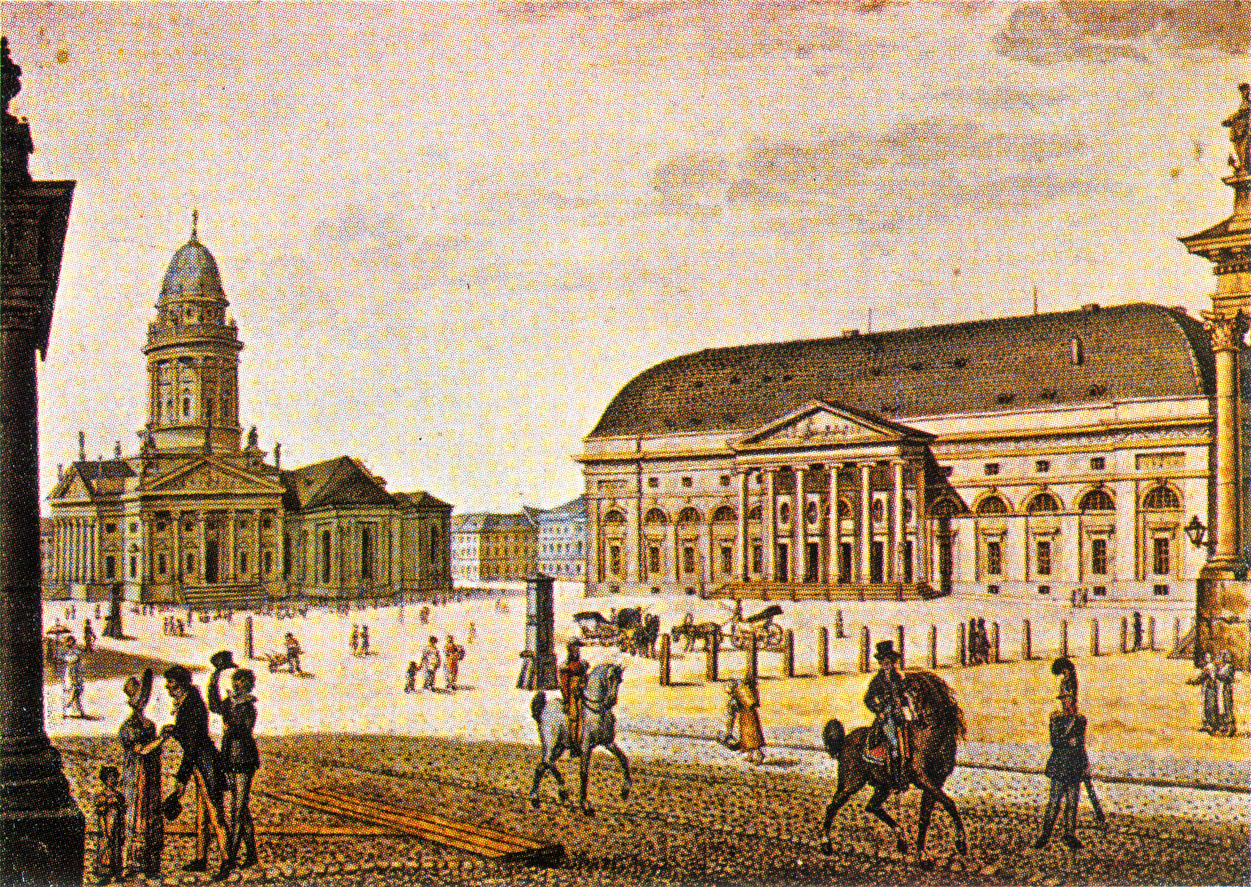
Royal National Theater at Gendarmenmarkt, Berlin (1800)

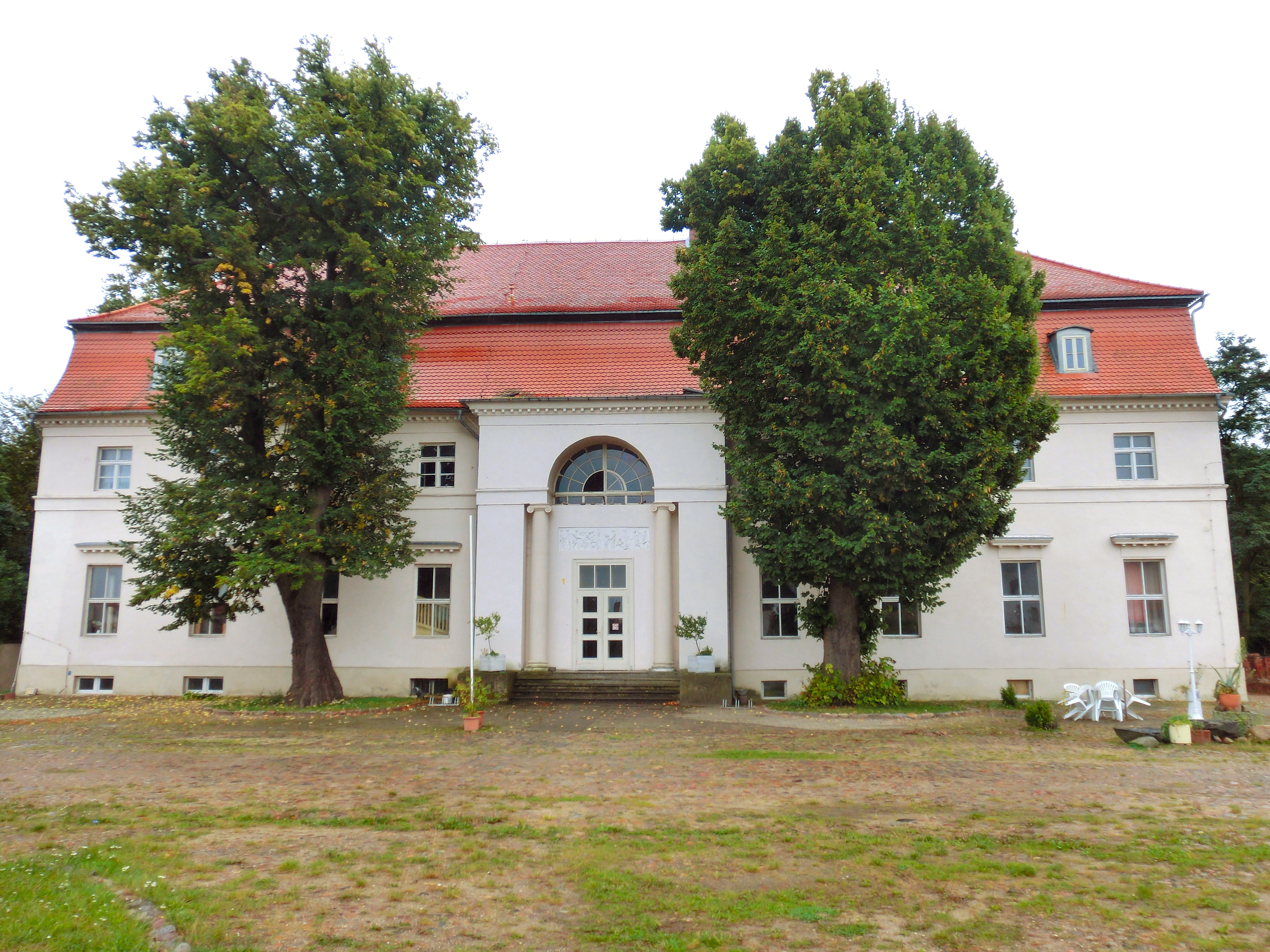
Kehnert Manor House (1803)
