= Wilhelm Jakob Hertling =

German painter (1849–1926)

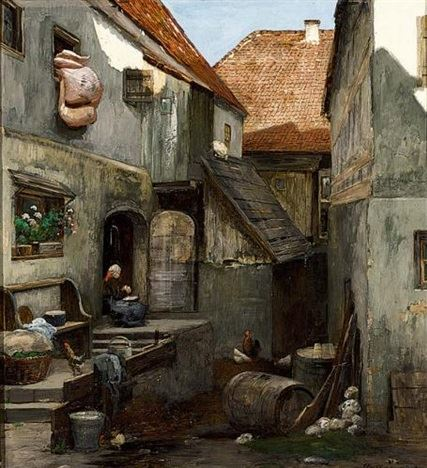
Farmhouse

Wilhelm Jakob Hertling (16 December 1849 – 8 October 1926) was a German landscape and genre painter.

== Life and work ==
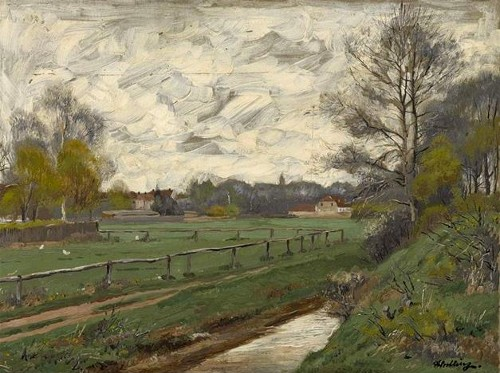
Landscape with a Stream

He was born in Katzenelnbogen to Jacob Hertling, a tradesman, and his wife Caroline née Meyer. His interests in music and drawing developed early. After his father's death, he and his mother went to the United States. There, he worked in an establishment that mass-produced copies of popular art works; a sort of painting factory. Although his musical talent was noted, he made no effort to seek professional training. In 1870, he returned to Germany, alone.

From 1873 to 1874, he studied at the Städelschule in Frankfurt am Main with Eduard von Steinle. In 1875, he went to live in the artists' colony at Kronberg im Taunus, where he continued his studies with Adolf Schreyer and Anton Burger until 1879. Further studies followed at the Kunstakademie Berlin with Hans Fredrik Gude.

In either 1882 or 1884, he settled in Munich and joined the circle of artists associated with Adolf Heinrich Lier. He spent 1886 painting at the Chiemsee. In 1894, he married the wealthy Fanny Hedwig von Hügel, widow of the Württemberg Major, August von Hügel (1841–1894), daughter of the former Minister of Culture, Ludwig von Golther, and sister of the philologist, Wolfgang Golther. In 1896, they moved into a villa in the exclusive neighborhood of Nymphenburg.

From 1899, he was regularly represented in exhibitions at the Glaspalast. Due to an eye ailment, he increasingly turned to watercolors after 1900. Together with Carl Strathmann, René Reinicke, Hans Wieland, Max Eduard Giese, Rudolf Köselitz, and several others, he was a co-founder of the Munich Watercolorists' Association.

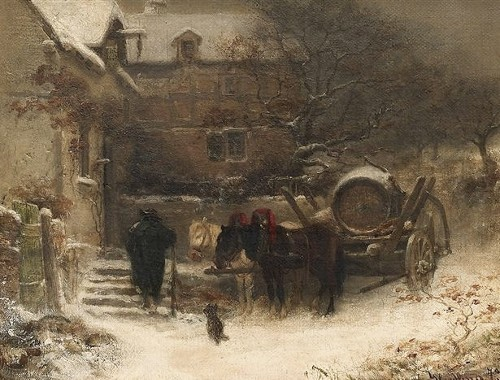
Homecoming on a Winter Evening

He died in 1926 in Munich. In 1927, a memorial exhibition was held at the Galerie Heinemann. His works may be seen at the Lindenau-Museum, the Staatliche Graphische Sammlung München, the Städtische Galerie im Lenbachhaus and the Neue Pinakothek.
