= Max Eduard Giese =

German painter (1867–1916)

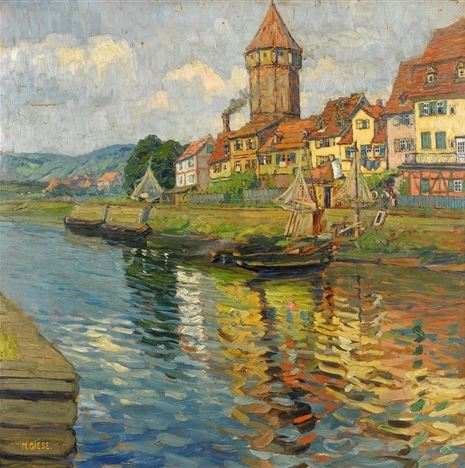
Wertheim am Main

Max Eduard Giese (5 July 1867, Düsseldorf - 9 July 1916, Munich) was a German landscape and cityscape painter, associated with the Düsseldorfer Malerschule.

== Life and work ==
He was the first son born to the architect, Ernst Giese, who had taken a professorship at the Kunstakademie Düsseldorf the year before, and his wife, Gertrud née Barteldes. His brother Friedrich, who would also become an architect, was born in 1871. The following year, his father moved back to his hometown of Dresden, to become a partner in a design firm. Max would return to Düsseldorf, to study painting at the Kunstakademie.

His most important teacher there was the Naturalistic landscape artist, Eugen Dücker, whose classes he attended from 1887 to 1889. He then went to Munich, where he was a private student of Ludwig Dill, after which he settled back in Dresden, as a free-lance painter. He also exhibited frequently; notably at the Glaspalast (from 1890), the Große Berliner Kunstausstellung (1893), and the Vienna Künstlerhaus (1894).

In 1897, he married a fellow painter, Martha Schmook (1860–1923), originally from Breslau and one of the founders of the Münchner Künstlerinnenverein (Female Artists' Association). In 1900, they moved to Munich, where they lived with her sister, the painter Elisabeth Schmook. Later, Martha became Chairwoman of the Federation of German and Austrian Artists' Associations.

In 1904, together with Carl Strathmann, René Reinicke, Hans Beat Wieland, Rudolf Köselitz, and several others, he was one of the co-founders of the Munich Watercolorists Association.
