= 1897 in architecture =

The year 1897 in architecture involved some significant events.

== Events ==
- April 3 – Vienna Secession group founded by Otto Wagner, Joseph Maria Olbrich and Josef Hoffmann among others.
- David Ewart succeeds Thomas Fuller as Chief Dominion Architect of the Government of Canada.
- James Knox Taylor becomes Supervising Architect of the United States Department of the Treasury.

== Buildings and structures ==
=== Buildings ===
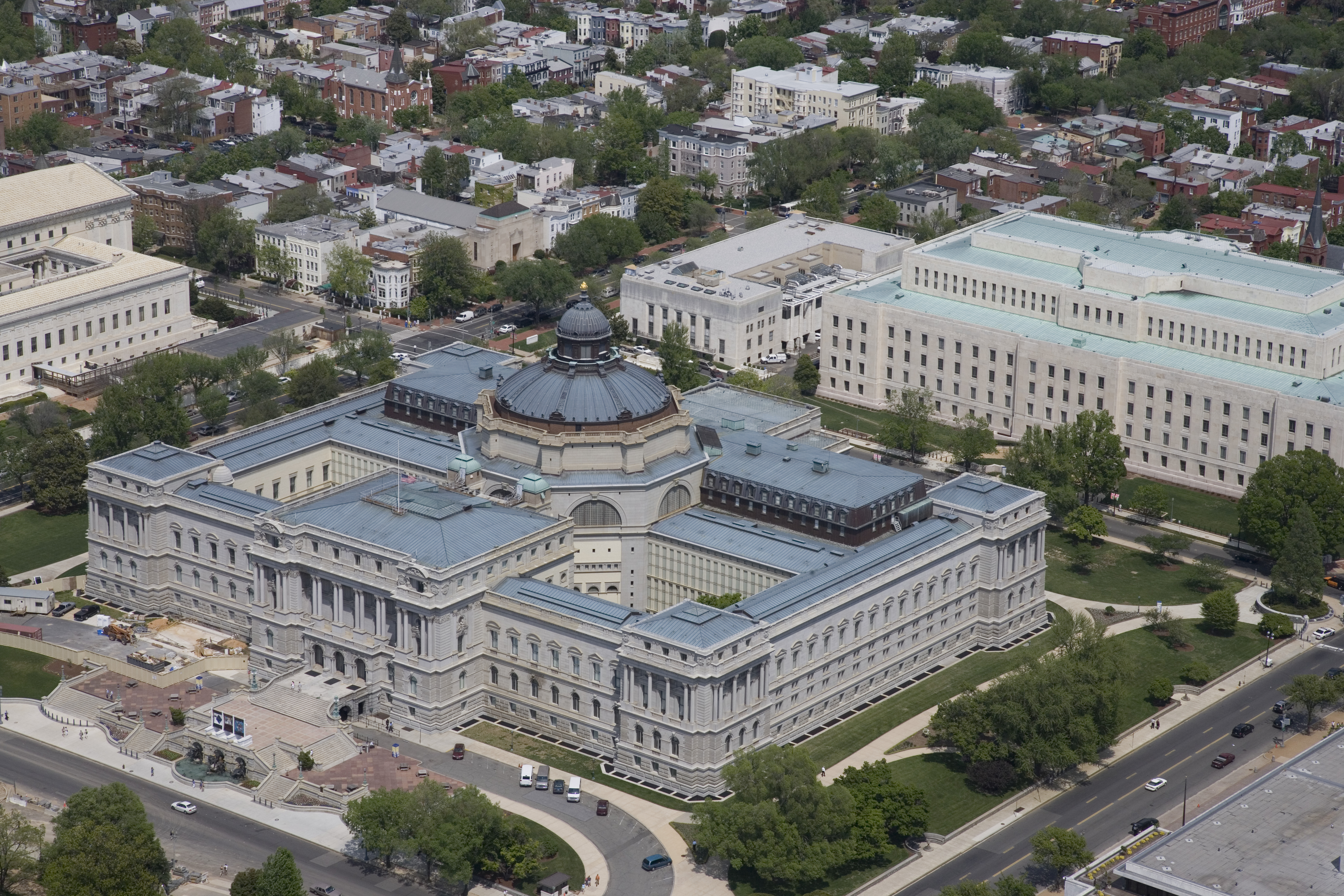
The Library of Congress Building in Washington, D.C.

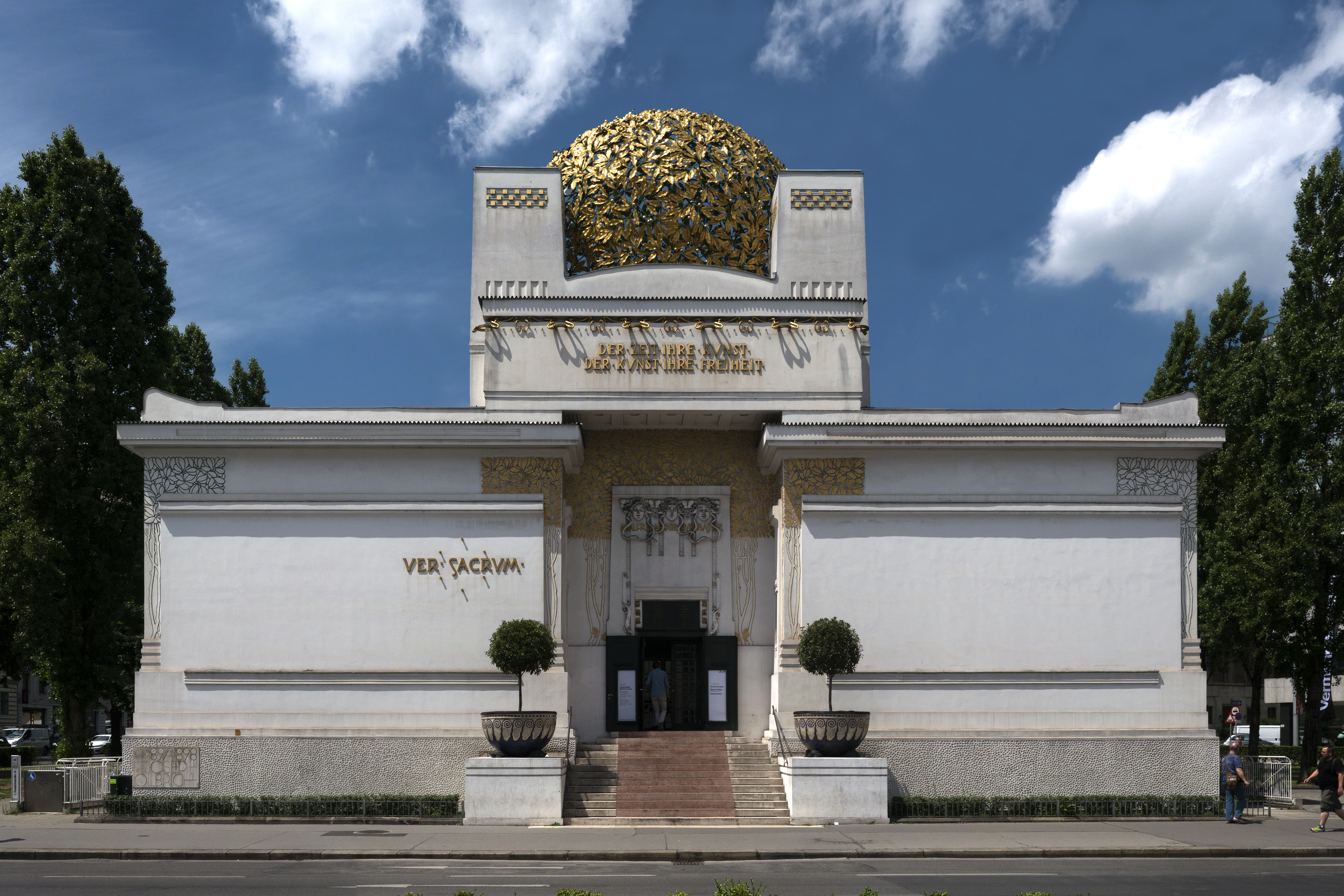
Secession Building, Vienna

- May 1
  - Ny Carlsberg Glyptotek art museum, designed by Wilhelm Dahlerup, opens in Copenhagen.
  - Tennessee Centennial Exposition opens in Nashville, with a temporary pyramid for Memphis, TN and a copy of the Parthenon, which will be rebuilt of permanent materials in the 1920s.
- May 12 – The new Oxford Town Hall, designed by Henry Hare, is officially opened in England.
- May 16 – The Teatro Massimo is inaugurated in Palermo; it is the largest opera theatre in Italy and the third in Europe.
- November 1 – The Library of Congress Building in Washington, D.C., designed by Paul J. Pelz, is opened.
- Christmas – The Cathedral of St. Vincent de Paul, Tunis, is completed.
- The Secession Building, Vienna, designed by Joseph Maria Olbrich is completed in Austria.
- Glasgow School of Art, designed by Charles Rennie Mackintosh, is begun in Scotland.
- Arts and Crafts movement houses in England:
  - Long Copse, Ewhurst, Surrey, designed by Alfred Hoare Powell, built.
  - Munstead Wood, designed by Edwin Lutyens for Gertrude Jekyll, completed.
- The Flatiron Building of Atlanta, Georgia, United States is completed, five years before New York City's more famous structure.
- First Church of Christ, Scientist (Chicago, Illinois), designed by Solon Spencer Beman, is built.
- The Battenberg Mausoleum, Sofia, designed by Hermann Mayer, is completed.
- The Weaver building, a mill at Swansea in Wales, becomes the first building in the United Kingdom to be constructed from reinforced concrete, by L. G. Mouchel to Hennebique patents.
- Dresden Hauptbahnhof railway station in Germany, designed by Ernst Giese and Paul Weidner, is completed.
- Restoration and remodelling of Castelldefels Castle in Spain by Enric Sagnier is completed.

== Awards ==
- RIBA Royal Gold Medal – Pierre Cuypers.

== Births ==
- January 2 – William Henry Harrison, American architect working in Whittier, California (died 1988)
- January 23 – Margarete Schütte-Lihotzky, Austrian architect (died 2000)
- February 11 – Jacob Christie Kielland, Norwegian architect (died 1972)
- February 25 – Elisabeth Coit, American architect (died 1987)
- April 18 – Charles N. Agree, American architect working in Detroit (died 1982)
- May 15 – Rudolf Schwarz, German architect (died 1961)
- August 16 – Helge Thiis, Norwegian architect and restorer (died 1972)
- September 9 – Nancy Lancaster, née Perkins, American-born interior decorator (died 1994)
- F. X. Velarde, English Catholic church architect (died 1960)

== Deaths ==
- January 10 – David Brandon, Scottish-born architect (born 1813)
- March 25 – Charles Eliot, American landscape architect (born 1859)
- May 6 – George Gilbert Scott, Jr., English architect (born 1839)
- June 22 – William Mason, New Zealand architect (born 1810)
- December 11 – John Loughborough Pearson, British architect (born 1817)
- William Lang, American architect (born 1846)
