= Carl Strathmann =

German painter

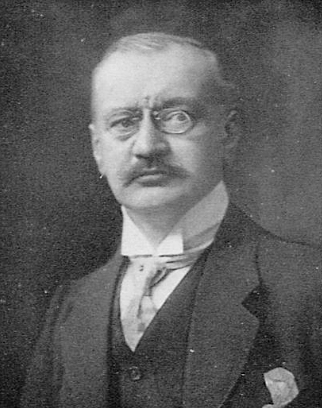
Carl Strathmann (1910s)

Carl Strathmann (11 September 1866 – 29 July 1939) was a German painter in the Art Nouveau and Symbolist styles.

== Biography ==
He was born in Düsseldorf. His father, also named Carl Strathmann, was a merchant and manufacturer, who later served as consul in Chile. His mother, Alice, was originally from Huddersfield, England, and was an art enthusiast. From 1882 to 1886, he studied at the Kunstakademie Düsseldorf, with Hugo Crola, Heinrich Lauenstein and Adolf Schill. After being dismissed for a "lack of talent", he enrolled at the Grand-Ducal Saxon Art School, Weimar where, from 1888 to 1889, he studied in the master class taught by Leopold von Kalckreuth.

When Kalckreuth left, he did as well; moving to Munich, where he lived a Bohemian lifestyle as a free-lance artist, and met the painter Lovis Corinth, who became a lifelong friend and associate. In 1894, he painted one of his best-known works: "Salammbô", inspired by a novel of the same name by Gustave Flaubert. In this monumental painting (6x9 feet) Salammbô, a high priestess of the Carthaginians, is shown caressing a snake, as part of a ritual sacrifice. Many were horrified, calling it a "sadistic fantasy". The scandal made him immediately famous.

Around 1900, he shared a studio with Alexander von Salzmann and Adelbert Niemeyer, and gained a reputation as a caricaturist, when a portfolio of his drawings was published by Edgar Hanfstaengl. This resulted in work for several periodicals, including Pan, the Fliegende Blätter, Jugend and Simplicissimus. He also created patterns for wallpaper, menu cards, bookmarks, postcards and posters.

He was a member of the artists' association, Allotria and, briefly, the Munich Secession, but left after some unspecified disputes. In 1904, together with René Reinicke, Hans Beat Wieland, Rudolf Köselitz, Wilhelm Jakob Hertling, and several others, he co-founded the Munich Watercolorists' Association. He exhibited with the Deutscher Künstlerbund and the Berlin Secession, which held a major showing of his work in 1917.

His death came in 1939 in Munich, at the age of seventy-two. A major retrospective of his work was held at the Münchner Stadtmuseum in 2019.

== Selected works ==
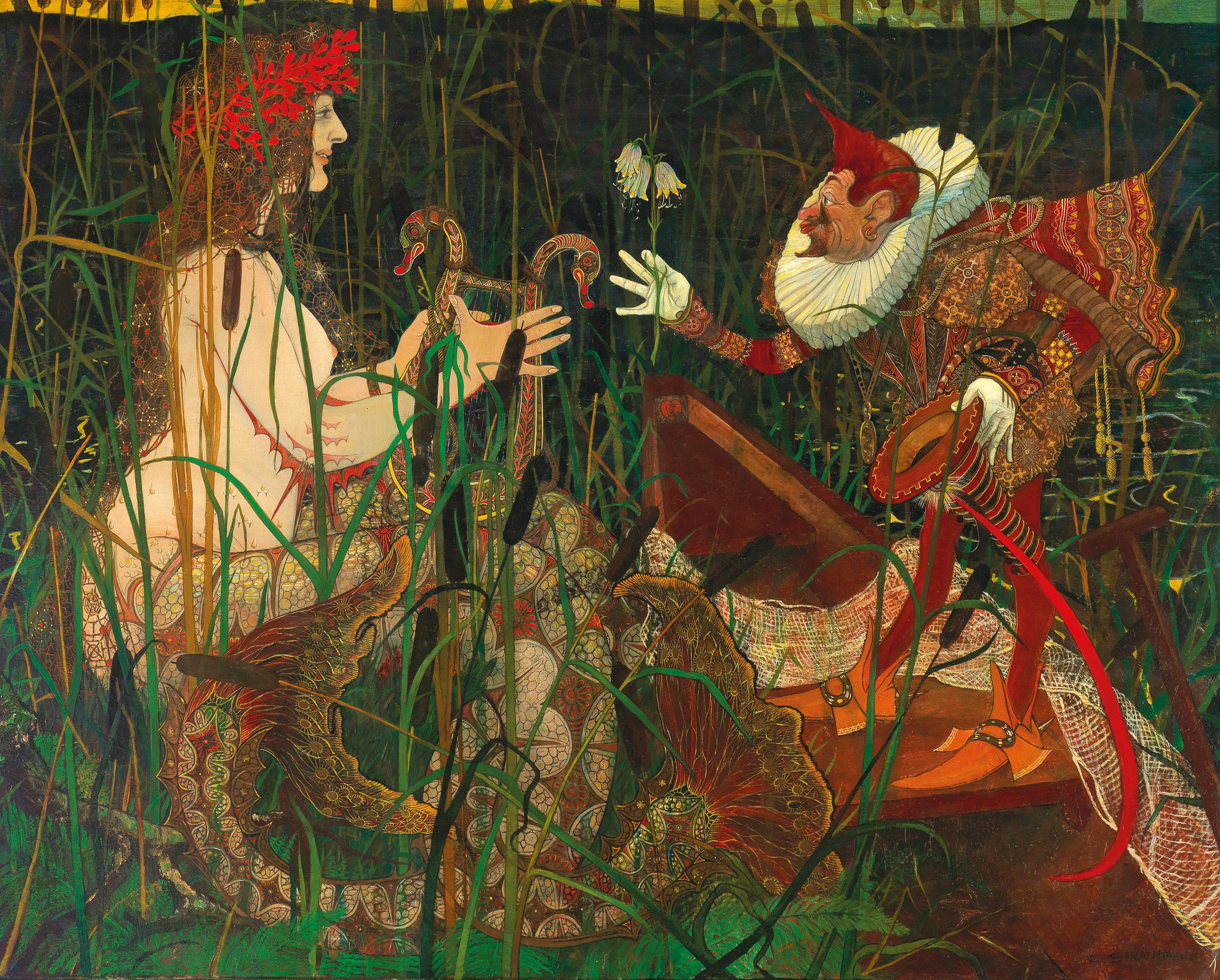
The Love Declaration

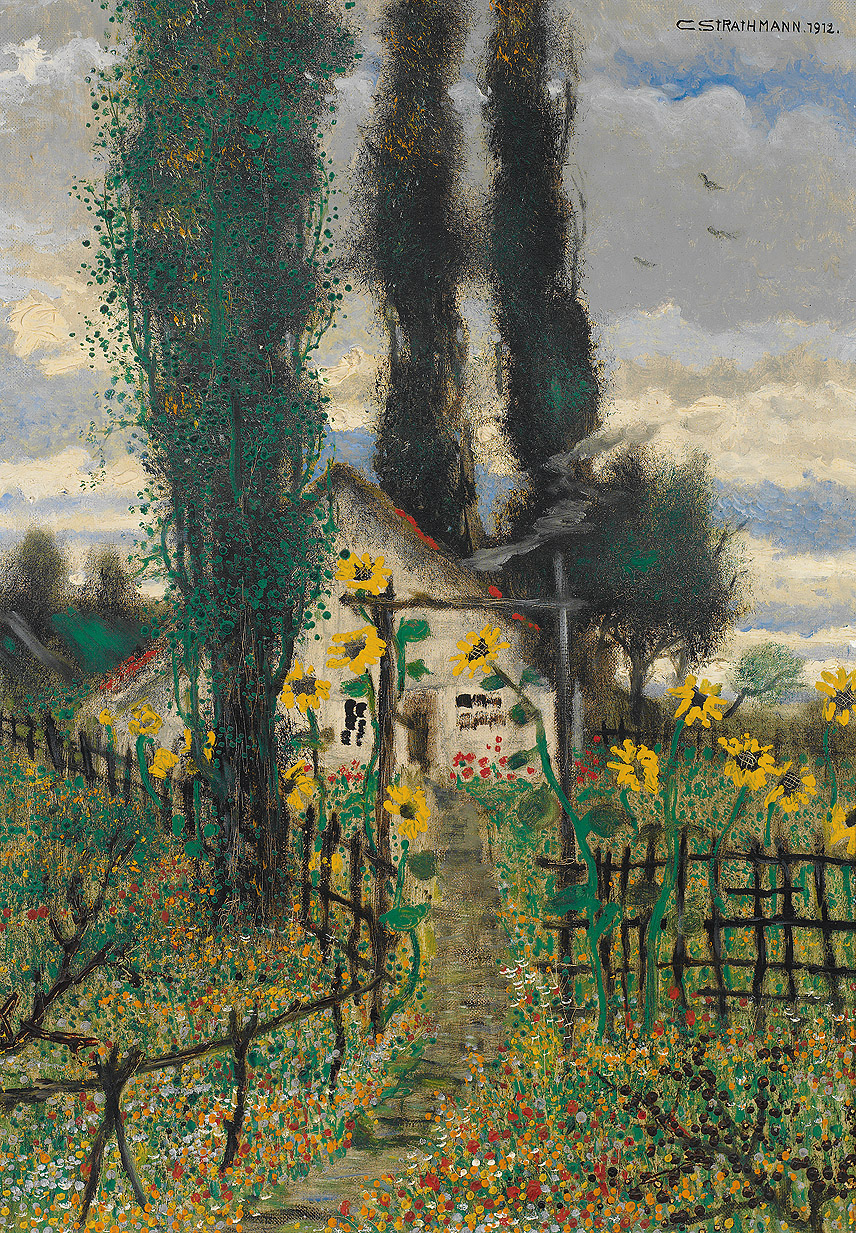
The Farmhouse

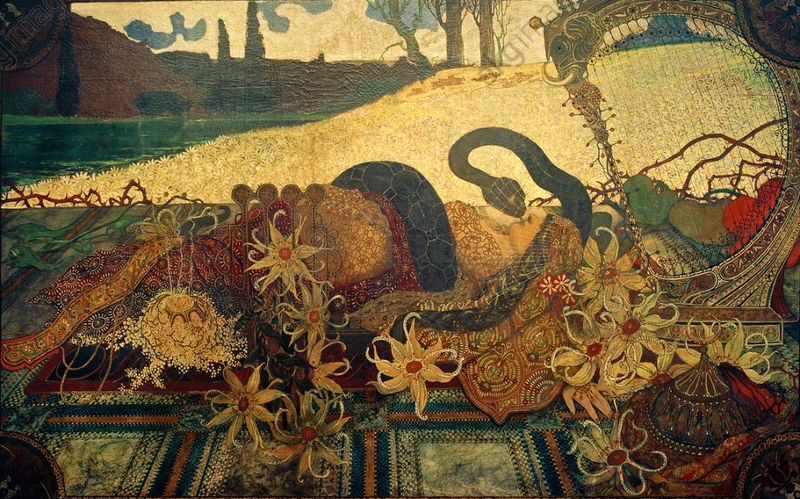
Salammbô

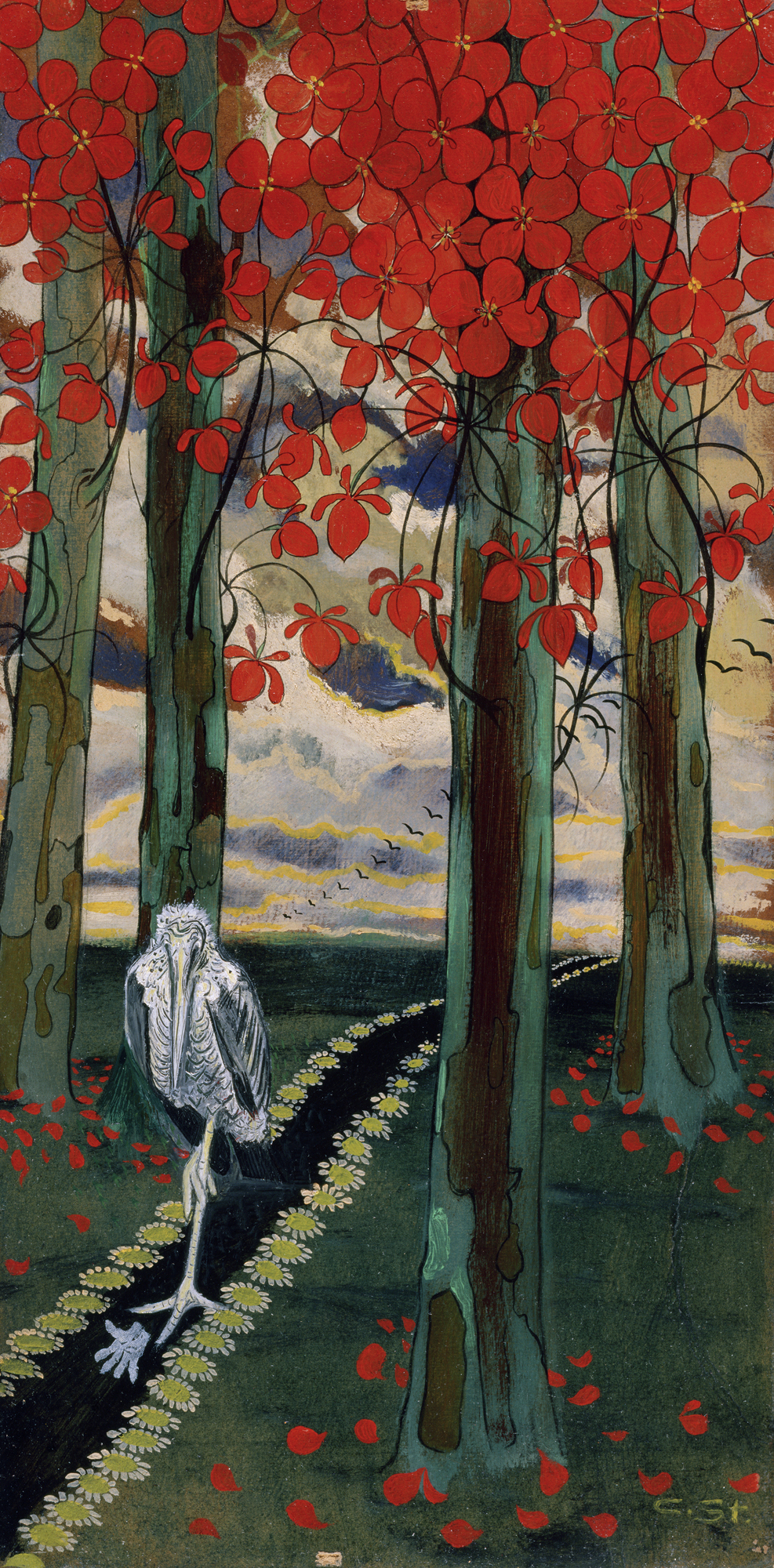
The Lost Glove

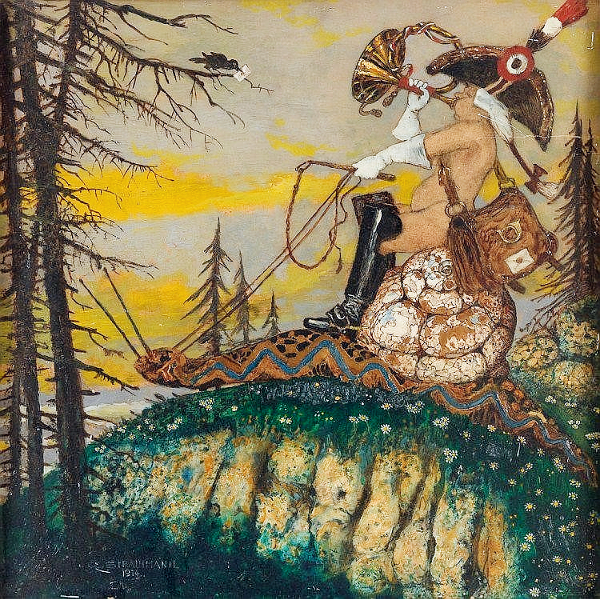
Snail Mail
