= Paul Weidner =

German architect

Paul Weidner (11 February 1843 or 11 April 1843 – 30 April 1899 complete name Bernhard Paul Weidner) was a German architect.

== Life and career ==
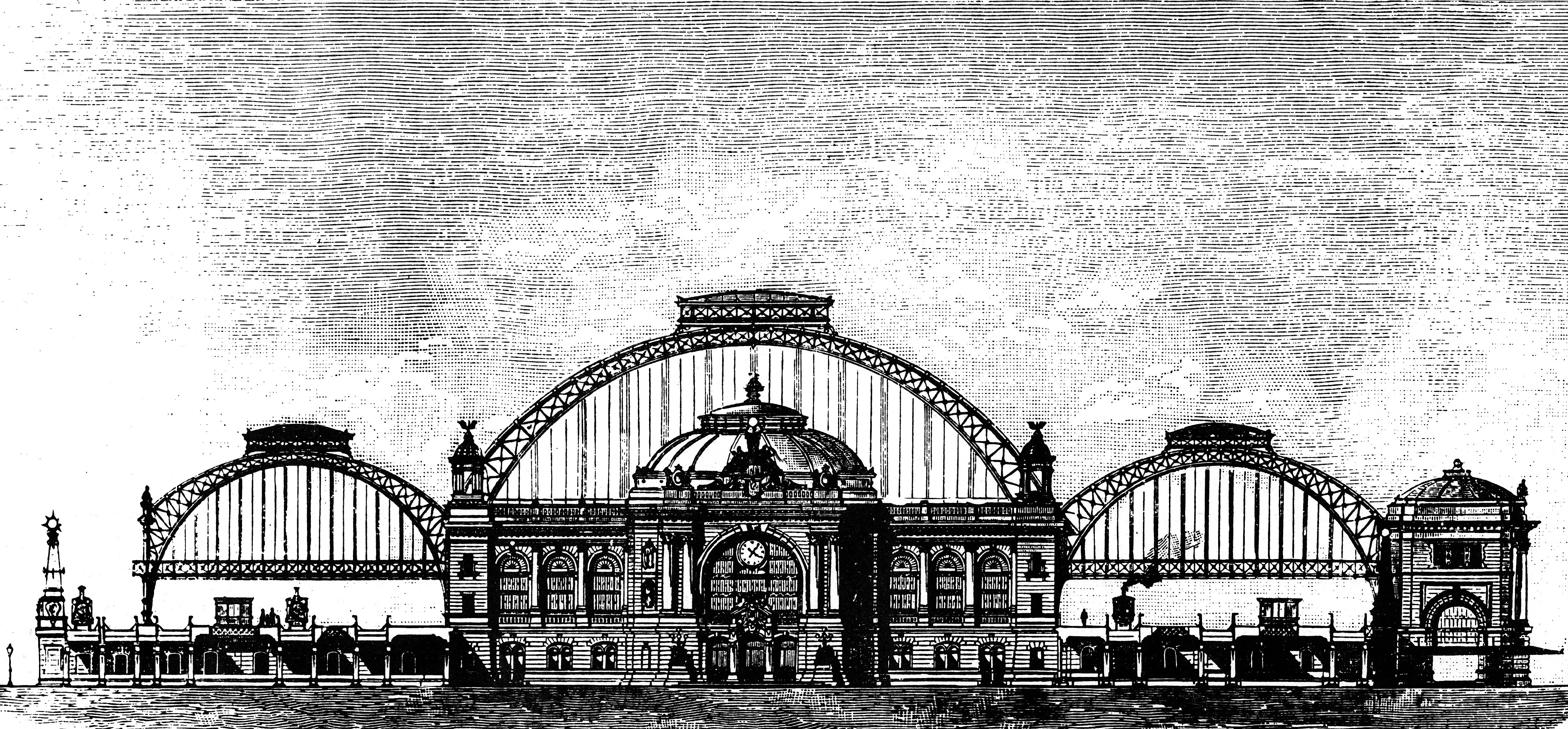
Competition design for Dresden Central Station, 1892

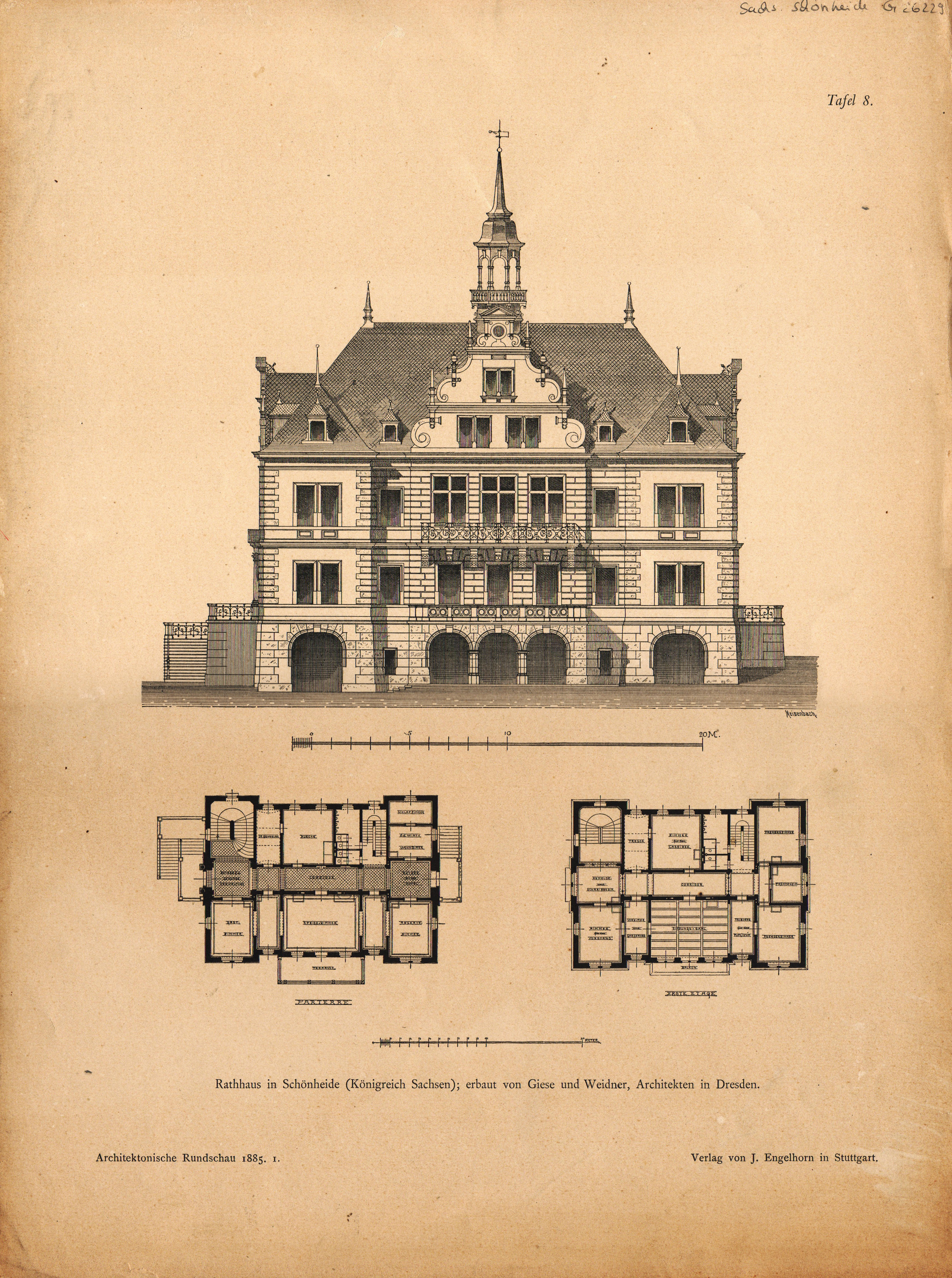
The Schönheide town hall was built in 1882 in the neo-Renaissance style.

Born in Dresden, Weidner studied architecture under Georg Hermann Nicolai at the building atelier of the Dresden Academy of Fine Arts. As the Semper-Nicolai-Schule, this educational institution introduced its adepts in particular to the historism of the Neo-Renaissance. In 1863, he received an honorary certificate, in 1866 the Small Golden Medal of the Academy of Arts, and in 1867 a travel grant for two years. Residing in Dresden, Weidner undertook a trip to Italy in 1870.

In 1874, he joined forces with Ernst Giese to form the architectural firm Giese & Weidner, which existed until 1892. In 1875, they won the Architectural design competition for the Kunsthalle Düsseldorf. Further competition successes and commissions followed. Particularly prestigious was the competition design for the Reichstag building in Berlin, which won 3rd prize in 1882. In 1882, the new town hall in the Erzgebirge town of Schönheide was realised, a building in the Neo-Renaissance style. In 1883 they were commissioned to build the Dresden Martin Luther Church. In 1892, their competition design for the Dresden Hauptbahnhof was awarded one of two 1st prizes and designated for execution. After the separation from his partner Giese shortly afterwards, whose architectural office henceforth operated under the name Giese & Sohn, Weidner was occupied with the construction of the main railway station, but otherwise could not continue the earlier successes. His last title was that of a (Royal Saxon) Baurats - since there is no evidence of Weidner working as a state Baubeamter, it seems to be an honorary title.

Weidmer died in Dresden at the age of 56.
