= Heinrich Köselitz =

German composer (1854–1918)

- Born: Johann Heinrich Köselitz; 10 January 1854; Annaberg, Kingdom of Saxony
- Died: 15 August 1918 (aged 64); Annaberg, Kingdom of Saxony
- Other name: Peter Gast
- Occupation: Composer
- Parent(s): Gustav Hermann Köselitz, Caroline Köselitz

Johann Heinrich Köselitz (10 January 1854 – 15 August 1918) was a German author and composer. He is known for his longtime friendship with Friedrich Nietzsche, who gave him the pseudonym Peter Gast.

== Life ==
Köselitz was born in Annaberg, Saxony to Gustav Hermann Köselitz (1822–1910), the vice mayor (Vizebürgermeister), and his wife Caroline (1819–1900), a native of Vienna. His younger brother was the painter Rudolf Köselitz.

From 1872, Köselitz studied music with Ernst Friedrich Richter at the University of Leipzig. He transferred in 1875 to the University of Basel, where he attended the lectures of Jacob Burckhardt, Franz Overbeck, and Friedrich Nietzsche. In 1877, Köselitz sharply criticized the Basel music instructor Selmar Bagge in a newspaper article, which led to a minor scandal.

In Basel, a friendship developed between Köselitz and Nietzsche. Köselitz read for Nietzsche during the latter's intermittent spells of near blindness, and also took dictation. Köselitz was instrumental in the preparation of all of Nietzsche's works after 1876, reviewing the printer's manuscript and sometimes intervening to finalize the text formatting. Nietzsche's break with Wagner and his search for a 'southern' aesthetic with which he could immunize himself from the gloomy German north led him to over-appreciate Köselitz as a musician: 'I should not know how to get along without Rossini; even less, without my own south in music, the music of my Venetian maëstro Pietro Gast. As an amanuensis, however, Köselitz really was invaluable; writing apropos Human, All Too Human, Nietzsche claimed that Gast 'wrote and also corrected: fundamentally, he was really the writer whereas I was merely the author'. All the while, Köselitz worshipped his teacher, assisting him to the point of self-denial.

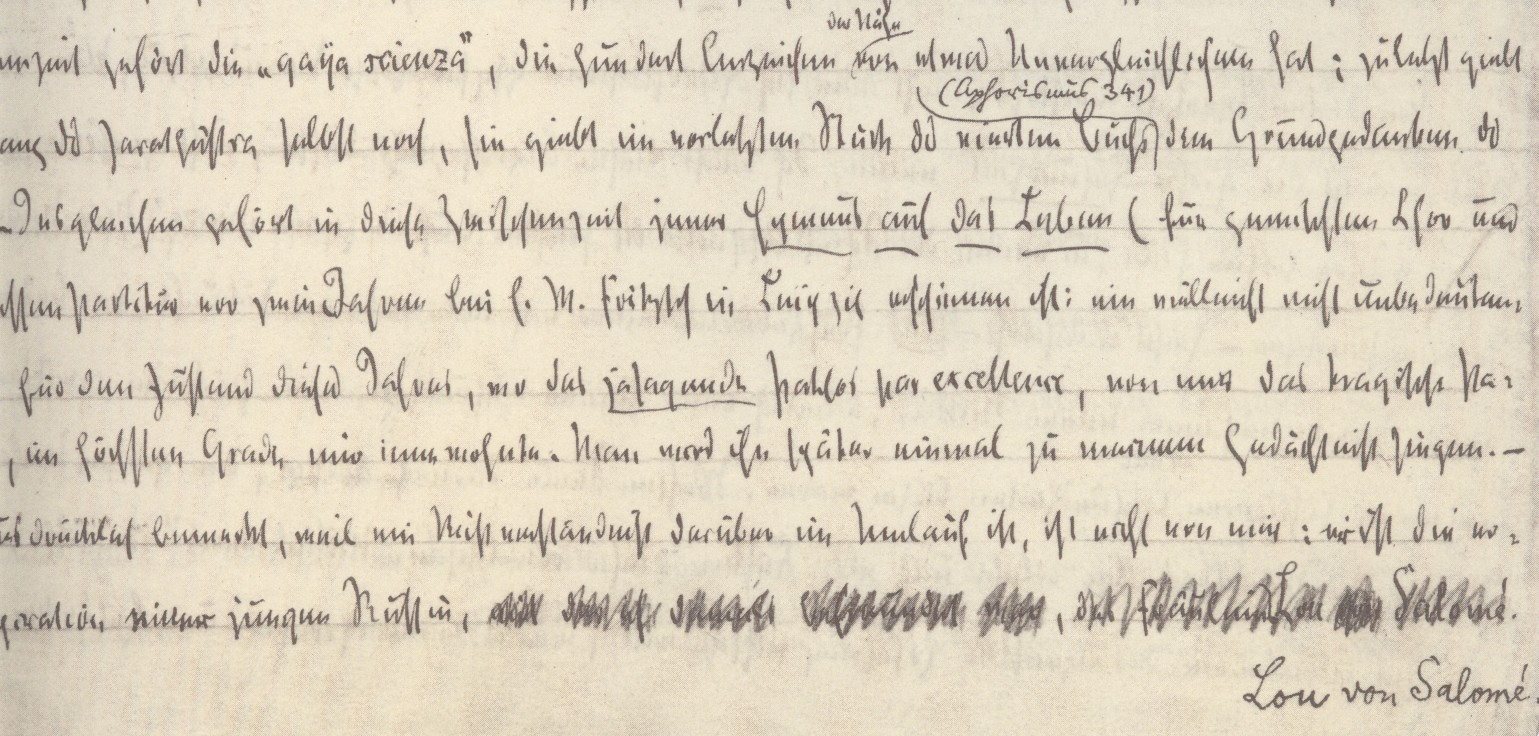
Köselitz would "correct" Nietzsche’s writings even after the philosopher's breakdown and did so without his approval - something heavily criticized by today's Nietzsche scholarship.

In the spring of 1881, while staying together in Recoaro, Nietzsche created the pseudonym 'Peter Gast' for Köselitz. This was the name he was known by among the Nietzsche circle, as well as being the name under which he published all his operas. The name itself is possibly a reference to Mozart's opera Don Giovanni, with its stone guest (Petrus "stone" in Latin, Gast "guest" in German). Peter Gast's most ambitious musical work is the comic opera in three acts The Lion of Venice (Der Löwe von Venedig). Throughout the 1880s, Gast and Nietzsche attempted without success to bring it to performance. It premiered in February 1891 in Danzig under the direction of Carl Fuchs, who exchanged letters with Nietzsche, but under its original title The Secret Wedding (Die heimliche Ehe or Il matrimonio segreto). In the 1930s, it would be shown once again under the title Nietzsche suggested, The Lion of Venice.

Following Nietzsche's mental collapse, Köselitz accepted Overbeck's proposal to temporarily halt the publication of the Ecce Homo, whose manuscript Nietzsche had already sent for edition, as well as The Antichrist, so that their salient aspects should not disturb the philosopher's reputation and the growing success of his earlier writings. In 1892, the editor Naumann entrusted the edition of the complete oeuvres to Köselitz, giving priority to the publication of the Zarathustra for the first time in whole (the fourth part had only received private printing), with a lengthy introduction to be signed Peter Gast. Next should be the Untimely Meditations, and then, in 1893, Human All Too Human, Beyond Good and Evil, and the Genealogy of Morals, each possessing a preface in which he would propose his interpretation, looking to support them on the basis of personal experiences and impressions from the time of his tight collaboration with Nietzsche.

But in October 1893, Elisabeth Förster-Nietzsche, back from Paraguay, rejected the legitimacy of Nietzsche's old-time secretary and made it so that all the works edited under his supervision be destroyed, going as far as discrediting him in the press. Köselitz, whose work was not protected by contract with the editor, could only bow out and send him all the manuscripts that he had carefully collected and assembled, particularly all that had not been edited, that is the Nachlass. In 1899, however, Nietzsche's sister, who had meanwhile founded the Nietzsche Archive, asked him to assist her in editing Nietzsche's correspondence, and then those of Nietzsche's notebooks which had remained in manuscript form, as he was the only one capable of deciphering the philosopher's writing. Köselitz accepted, then, to collaborate actively for the compilation of 483 posthumous aphorisms, edited in 1901 under the title The Will to Power, expanded to 1067 aphorisms in 1906. Breaking again in 1909 with Förster-Nietzsche, he withdrew to his "Epicururean garden" in Annaberg to lead a pleasant life, dedicating his last years to writing essays and poems, sometimes borrowing in the latter the turns of phrase specific to its region, the Erzgebirge.

Köselitz was financed by his father, and also intermittently supported by Nietzsche's friend Paul Rée. In addition to being a musician and the editor of Nietzsche's writings and letters, he worked as a writer under various pseudonyms, including: Ludwig Mürner, Peter Schlemihl, Petrus Eremitus. He sent articles to many newspapers, and also wrote several short stories and fables.
