= Ernst Giese =

German architect

Ernst Friedrich Giese (16 April 1832 – 12 October 1903) was a German architect and university professor at the Düsseldorf Art Academy and at the Technical University of Dresden.

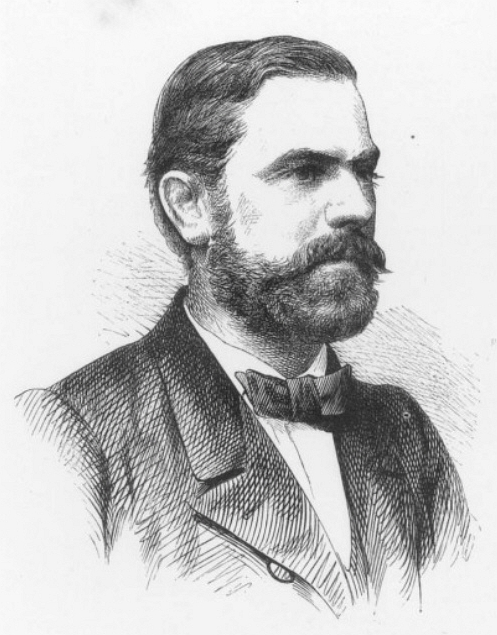
Ernst Giese (from a newspaper dated 22 July 1865)

== Early life ==
Giese grew up in Bautzen. There he attended the high school. He then studied at the Dresden Polytechnic and at the Dresden Art Academy with Hermann Nicolai. From 1855 to 1858, Giese was on a grant in Italy for study purposes.

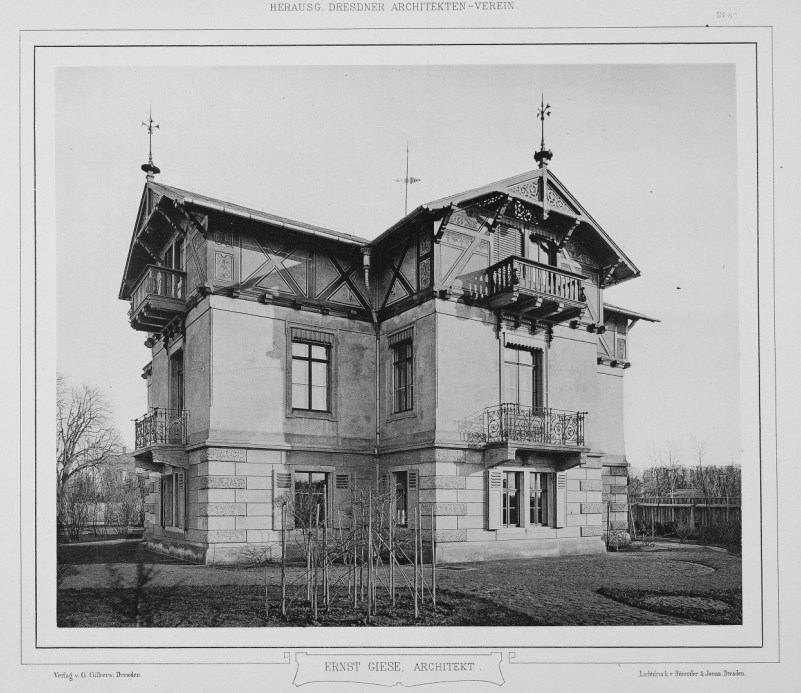
Mr. Barteldes country house in Blasewitz near Dresden

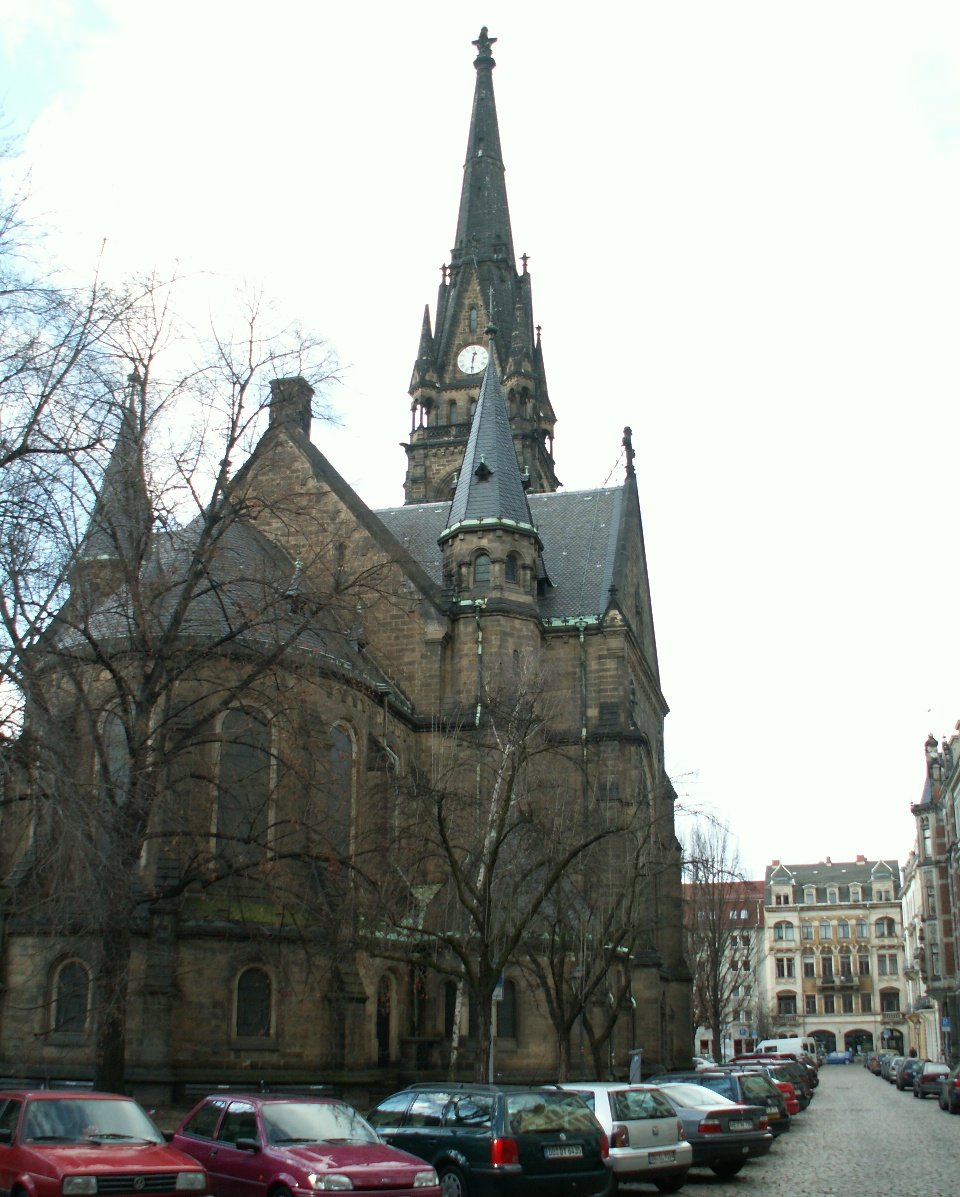
Martin-Luther-Kirche at Dresden

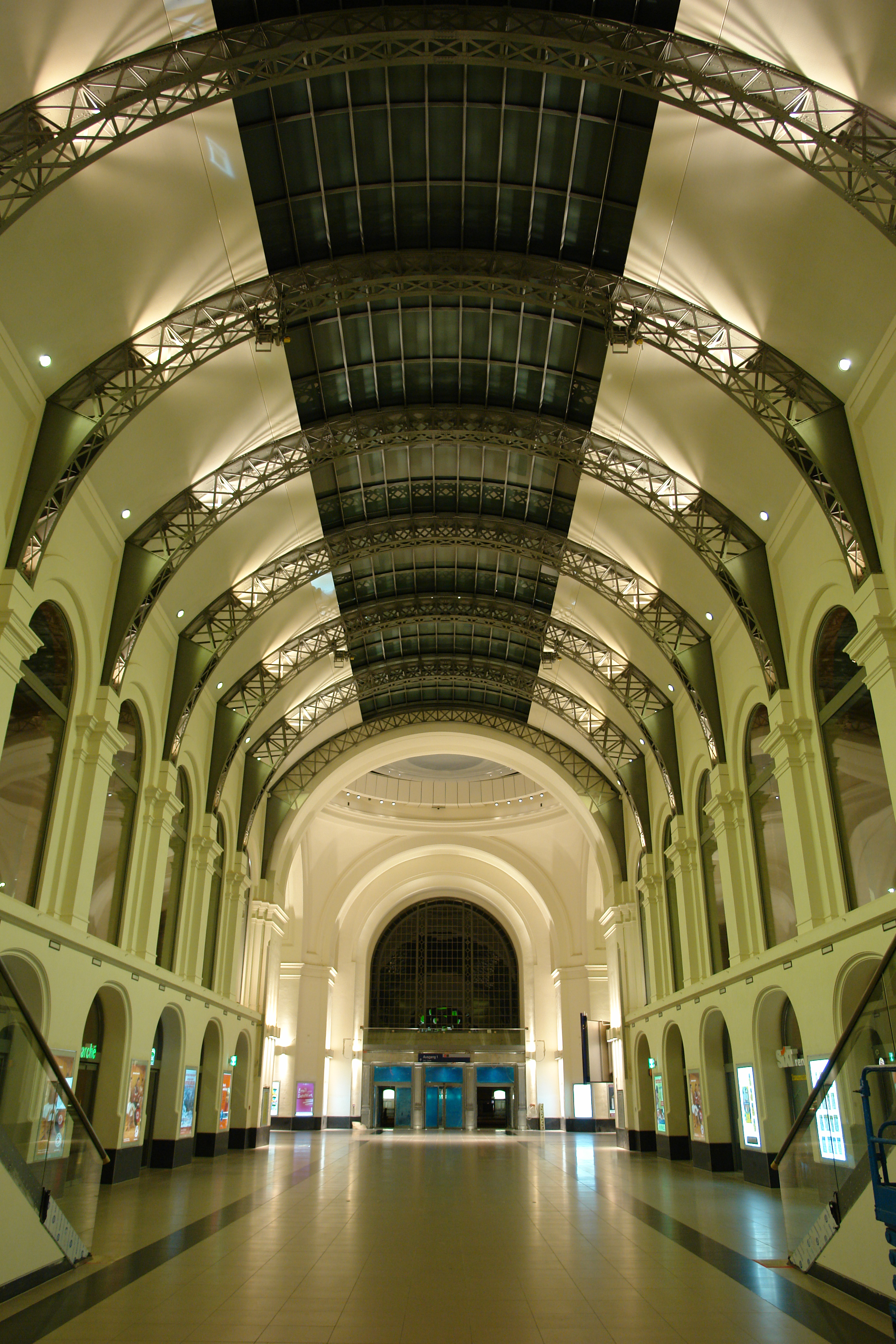
The entrance hall of the main station of Dresden, Germany

== Work ==
After the trip to Italy, he returned to Dresden and ran a joint architectural office with Bernhard Schreiber. In 1866, Giese accepted a professorship in architecture at the Düsseldorf Art Academy. He performed this function part-time. His wife Gertrud, née Barteldes, gave birth to his first son Max Eduard, who became a landscape painter, in 1867, and Friedrich, who joined his later Dresden office as an architect in 1871. Because he did not offer the options in Düsseldorf, which he had hoped, he returned in 1872 to Dresden and initially teamed up with the architect Frederick O. Hartmann. In August 1873, he caught up for a short time Cornelius Gurlitt in his Dresden office. In 1874 he separated from Hartmann and worked with Paul Weidner (1843–1899) for the next 17 years (Giese & Weidner).

In 1878 Giese was appointed full professor of architecture at the Dresden Polytechnic (since 1890: Dresden University of Technology); he held this teaching position until the fall of 1900. The joint architectural office with Weidner existed in parallel until 1891, from then on Giese worked with his son Friedrich (Giese & Sohn). Evidence of the professional reputation that Ernst Giese earned as an architect and university professor is also his appointment in 1892 as a full member of the Prussian Academy of the Arts. After retiring in 1900, Giese moved to (Berlin) Charlottenburg, where he died in 1903.

The architect Julius Graebner was one of his students in Dresden.

== Notable works ==
(in cooperation with the respective office partners Schreiber, Hartmann or Weidner or his son)

- 1866: Death hall of the New Jewish Cemetery in Dresden-Johannstadt, later used as a synagogue
- 1873–1875: Düsseldorf City Theater (since 1920: Opera House), today the venue of the Deutsche Oper am Rhein (greatly changed)
- 1875: Villa Barteldes in Blasewitz near Dresden
- 1875 competition design, 1878–1881 execution: Kunsthalle Düsseldorf (destroyed)
- 1875: Stadtbad in Löbau (today's restaurant " König-Albert-Bad ", completely renovated)
- 1877–1879: Entomological Museum “Ludwig Salvator” for Ludwig Wilhelm Schaufuss (1833–1890) in Blasewitz near Dresden
- 1878–1880: Head office of the liquor company Underberg, so-called Underberg Palais, in Rheinberg
- 1882: City Hall in Schönheide
- 1882–1883: Gewandhaus in Bautzen
- 1882 Competition design, 1883–1887 Execution: Martin Luther Church in Dresden
- 1883–1884: Villa Wolf in Dresden, Altenzeller Strasse 50
- 1885: Renovation of the Hohenhaus mansion in Zitzschewig, Barkengasse 6
- 1890: Competition design for the Luther Church in Radebeul
- 1892–1897: Dresden Hauptbahnhof (Giese and Weidner in collaboration with Arwed Roßbach)
- 1893–1894: Villa Jacoby in Blasewitz near Dresden, Lothringer Weg 2 (destroyed)
- 1896: Catholic Rosary Church in Radibor (Saxony)
- 1896: War memorial for those killed in the Franco-Prussian War 1870/1871 on the Klusenberg in Altena
- 1898 competition design, 1899–1901 execution: Evangelical Lukaskirche in Chemnitz, Josephinenplatz (destroyed)

== Literature ==
- Geh. Hofrat Prof. E. F. Giese †. In: Zentralblatt der Bauverwaltung, 23. Year 1903, No. 85 (vol 24. October 1903), S. 532.
- Thieme, Ulrich; Willis, Fred. C. (2018). General Lexicon of Fine Artists, From Antiquity to the Present, Vol. 14: Giddens-Gress (Classic Reprint) (German ed.). Forgotten Books. ISBN 978-1-396-28825-8.
- Fiedler, Frank; Fiedler, Uwe (2017). Lebensbilder aus der Oberlausitz: 60 Biografien aus Bautzen, Bischofswerda und Umgebung (in German). BoD – Books on Demand. ISBN 978-3-7448-7197-6.
