= Bernhard Schreiber =

German architect

Karl Friedrich Bernhard Schreiber (September 19, 1833 – March 5, 1894) was a German architect.

== About ==
Schreiber studied at the Dresden Art Academy with Georg Hermann Nicolai. Between 1858 and 1866 he worked in partnership with the architect Ernst Giese. He was known for a "close connection to Nicolai " and for the "early use of the German Renaissance".

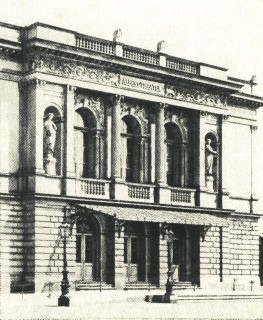
Albert Theater, 1875

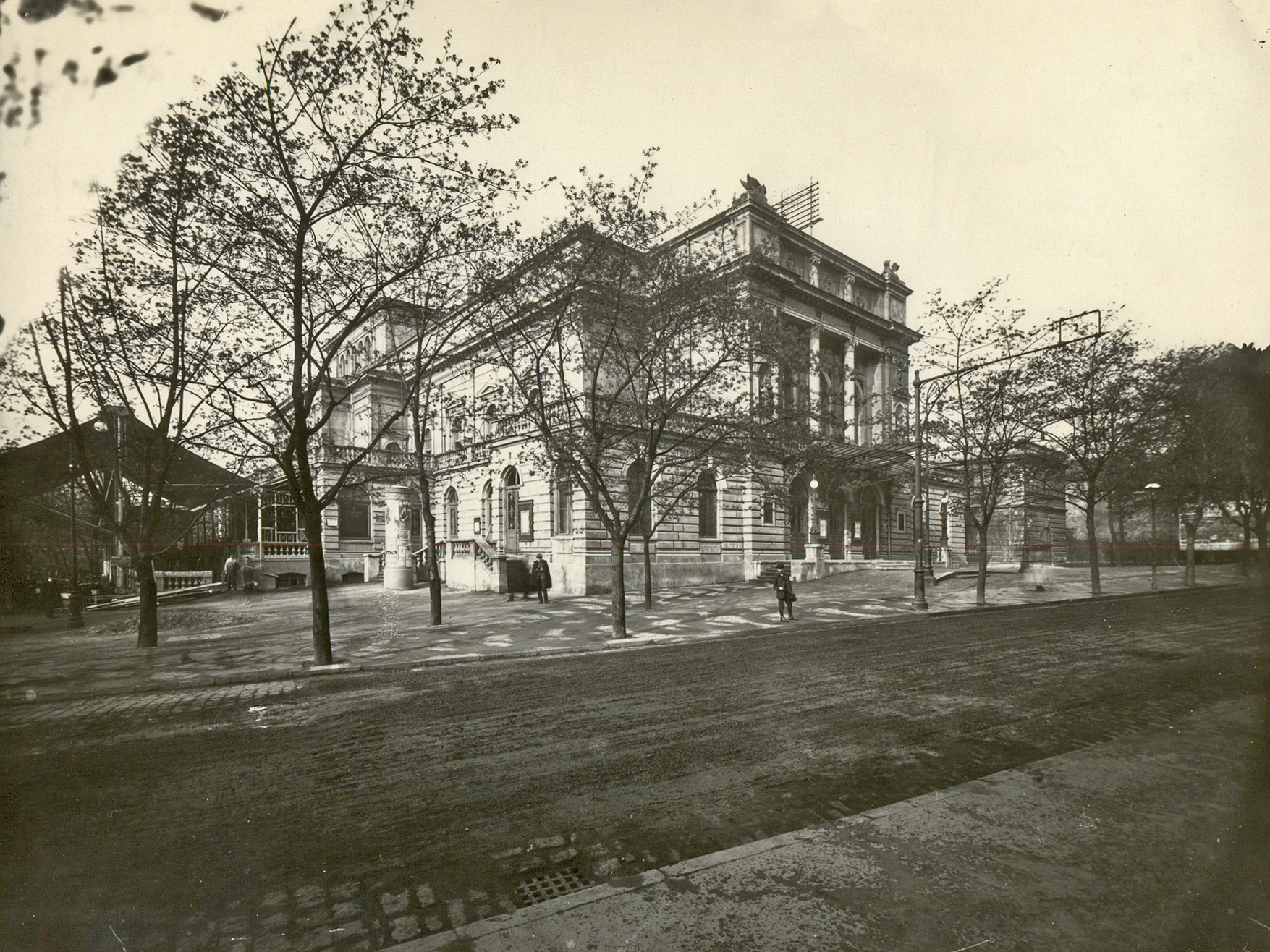
Old city theater of Teplitz (1874-1919)

Schreiber died in Dresden in 1894 and was buried in the Old Annen Cemetery.

== Notable works ==
- 1862/1870: Gauernitz, reconstruction of the castle in the style of the Saxon Renaissance Revival Architecture (with Ernst Giese)
- 1868: Dresden, conversion of the “Lodge to the bronze pillars” at Bautzner Strasse 19 in the style of the Nicolai school with a pilaster architecture
- 1868/1869: Dresden, Villa Pilz, Parkstrasse 4
- 1872/1874: Dresden, Villa Tasch, Bernhardstrasse 6
- 1871/1873: Dresden, Albert Theater
- 1872/1874: Dresden, Palais Kap-herr, Parkstrasse 7
- 1872/1874: Teplitz, Altes Stadttheater (construction management: Hermann Rudolph)
- 1884/1885: Constappel, conversion of the Constappel church

== Literature ==
- Helas, Volker; Classen, Martin (1991). Villenarchitektur Dresden (in German). B. Taschen. ISBN 978-3-8228-9755-3.
- Klimpel, Volker (2002). Berühmte Dresdner: historisch-biographisches Handbuch bedeutender Persönlichkeiten, geboren in Dresden (in German). Hellerau-Verlag. ISBN 978-3-910184-85-5.
