= Elizabeth Coit =

American architect

- Born: 1892; Winchester, Massachusetts
- Died: 1987 (aged 94–95)
- Education: Radcliffe College; Massachusetts Institute of Technology
- Occupation: Architect
- Awards: Langley Award
- Practice: Grosvenor Atterbury; United States Housing Authority

Elizabeth (sometimes spelled Elisabeth) Coit FAIA (1892 - 1987) was an American architect. Her career was devoted to housing in the public sector.

== Biography ==
Coit was born in Winchester, Massachusetts in 1892. She graduated from Radcliffe College in 1911, attended the School of the Museum of Fine Arts, Boston and received her Bachelor of Architecture from the Massachusetts Institute of Technology in 1919. After graduation, she worked as a drafter, designer, and drafting supervisor at the office of Grosvenor Atterbury, and in 1926, she became a licensed architect in New York State. She began working part-time on her own projects while still employed by Grosvenor Atterbury, and opened her own firm in New York City in 1930, which she ran until 1942. Her office designed houses mainly for women outside of the city and for businesses in the state.

In 1941, she published "Design and Construction of the Dwelling Unit for the Low-Income Family," which was a study about low-income housing in the United States. From 1942 - 1947, she was the technical standards editor for the United States Housing Authority's Public Housing Design in Washington, D.C., followed by a research position at Mayer and Whittersley from 1947 - 1948. In 1948, she became the principal planner for the New York City Housing Authority, where she worked until her retirement in 1962. Even in retirement she continued to serve as an adviser for government and private housing organizations. In 1973, she was elected into the National Academy of Design as an Associate Academician.

Coit contributed to numerous pamphlets about housing, was a book reviewer for the Architectural Record, and in 1968, became the editor for the New York Metropolitan Chapter of the National Association of Housing and Redevelopment Officials. She was the first woman to receive Langley Award from the American Institute of Architects (AIA). She was elected as a Fellow of the AIA in 1955, and received a Pioneer in Architecture from the New York Chapter of the AIA in 1969.

== Awards and honors ==
- Better Homes in America Small House Architectural Competition (1932)
- Langley Award, American Institute of Architects (1938-1940)
- Pioneer in Architecture award, American Institute of Architects New York Chapter (1969)
- Honorary Degree, Wilson College (1969)

== Works ==
=== Buildings ===
Some of her buildings are:

- Anna B. Van Nort House, Croton Heights, N.Y. (1932)
- Cafeteria, Consumer's Cooperative Service, Inc., 136 E. 44th St., New York City (ca. 1939)
- Philip Maguire House, Shrub Oaks, N.Y. (ca. 1940)
- Winslow Sommaripa House, Boyce, VA. (not dated)

=== Writings ===
Some of her writings are:

- "Housing from Tenant's Viewpoint." Architectural Record 91 (April 1942): 71–84.
- "Notes on the Design and Construction of the Dwelling Units for the Lower Income Family." The Octagon (1941):10-30, and (November 1941): 7-22
- "A Plea for More Space." CHPC Housing News 9, no. 3 (January 1951):3.
- Report on Family Living in High Apartment Buildings. Washington, D.C.: Government Printing Office, 1965.
- "Terra Cotta in Manuta, 1444 A.D." Atlantic Terra Cotta 7, no. 4 (some photos and drawings by Coit).
