= Georg Hermann Nicolai =

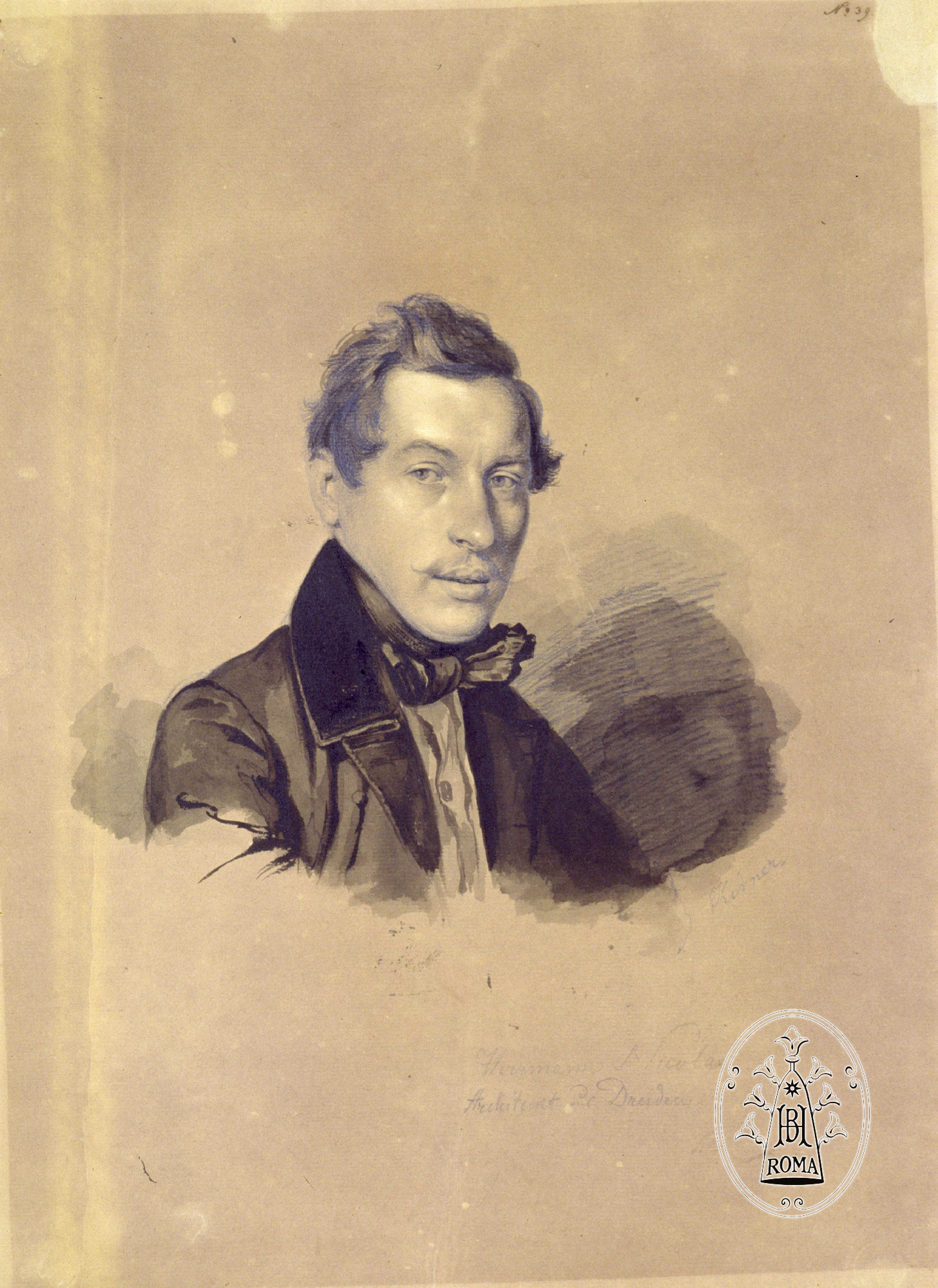
Hermann Nicolai; portrait by Johann Baptist Kirner (c.1834)

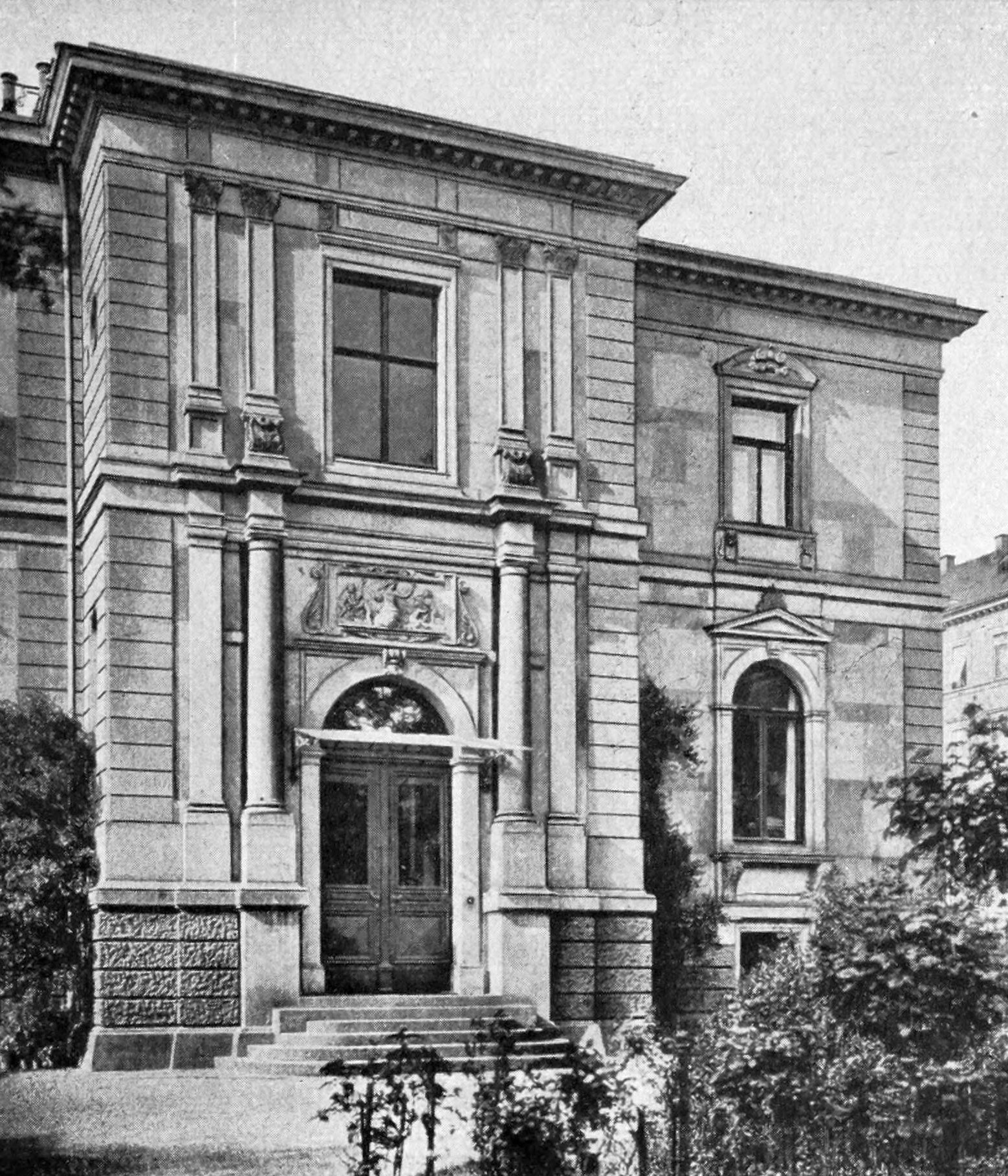
Villa Struve; destroyed in World War II

Georg Hermann Nicolai (10 January 1812 – 10 July 1881) was a German architect and educator, Professor of Architecture at the Royal Academy of Fine Arts on the Brühl Terrace in Dresden from 1850 until his death.

== Life ==
Nicolai was born at Torgau, in the Kingdom of Saxony. He studied architecture at the Dresden Academy with Bernhard Schreiber under Joseph Thürmer and later in Munich under Friedrich von Gärtner. Travels to Italy included stints in 1834-5 and 1839-40. He served as Hofbaumeister in Coburg from 1841–45 and established a private practice in Frankfurt am Main from 1845-48. In mid-summer 1850 he succeeded Gottfried Semper as Professor of the Bauatelier of the Dresden Academy of Fine Arts many months after Semper had participated in building a barricade in the May Uprising of the previous year. Nicolai brought a fine sensibility to the reinterpretation of Quattrocento-style Neorenaissance architecture in Dresden in his years at the Academy, and was an extremely popular teacher. Many of his students went on to distinguished careers in Saxony and beyond. He died at died Bodenbach (Elbe), aged 69. Upon his death, his former pupil Constantin Lipsius (1832-1894) was named his replacement.

== Principal works ==
- Seebach Residence (1839)
- Villa Struve (1851-2)
- Villa Meyer (1867–69)
- Reconstruction of Prince George's Palace on the Zinzendorfstrasse (1855-7)
- Villa Seiler (1867-8)

All of these were destroyed during the Allied bombing of Dresden in World War II.
