= Rudolf Köselitz =

German painter (1861–1948)

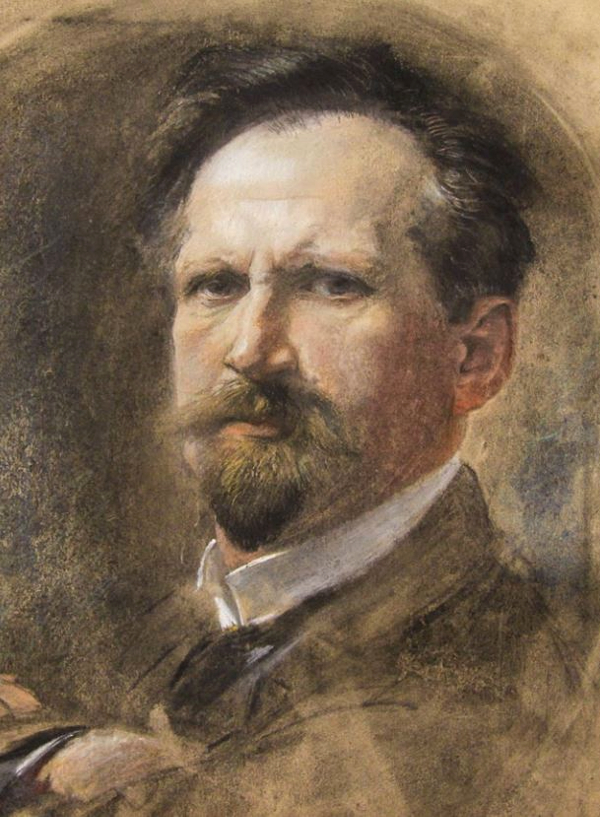
- Self-portrait (1906)
- Born: 23 October 1861; Annaberg-Buchholz
- Died: 21 January 1948 (aged 86); Munich
- Occupation(s): Painter and Illustrator

Rudolf Köselitz (born 23 October 1861 in Annaberg-Buchholz; died 21 January 1948 in Munich) was a German painter and Illustrator.

== Early life and education ==
Rudolf Köselitz was born in 1861 to Gustav Hermann Köselitz, vice mayor of Annaberg-Buchholz. He was the younger brother of Heinrich Köselitz, a German author and composer. Both the brothers received early education in fine art. Heinrich turned to studying music while Rudolf was drawn to painting.

Rudolf's talent was discovered by a drawing teacher at the secondary school. The latter proposed to the father that the fifteen-year-old study at the Leipzig Art Academy, which the latter also allowed. In 1881, Köselitz joined art academy in Munich to continue his studies. He was taught there by Carl Theodor von Piloty. His first study trip took him to Venice in the same year. There he was inspired by the Italian Renaissance and met here with his brother Heinrich, who was getting musical inspiration for his opera - The Lion of Venice (opera). Later, he returned to Germany and lived in Dresden until 1900.

=== Personal life ===
He was married Marie B. Bruhm and had two daughters; Doris and Johanna/Hanna. The second daughter died in 1927 in a boat accident.

== Work and influence ==
In 1901 the renowned art publisher in Wolfenbüttel, Zwißler published 40 collotype reproductions based on watercolors by Rudolf Köselitz. Köselitz has become particularly well-known for his works, which have the Ore Mountains and its people as their content, for example. B. the Frohnau hammer and its last hammer lords Martin, or the city views of Annaberg. For the Christmas eve song, written in 1799 by Johanne Amalie von Elterlein, he created the illustrations of song postcards around 1910.

Further works were created in his adopted home Munich, where he joined the Association of Munich Watercolor Artists, and from 1910 in his studio in Altfreimann near Munich. Some genre pictures with idyllic content also fall into this creative period, some of which, as commissioned works, reflect the taste of the time. His main works, which art historians consider to be the last offshoots of Munich Romanticism, include: a. Naiad Dance (Najadentanz), Love Ancestors (Liebesahnen), Bathing Children (Badende Kinder), Summer (Sommer), The Brittle (Die Spröde) and the Witch's Dance (Hexentanz). But his watercolors such as the grain harvest, village parzen or chess players have also received great attention in numerous exhibitions.

In 1901, the painting "Inside a hammer mill" (Frohnauer Hammer, 1889) by Rudolf Köselitz hung in the Berlin National Gallery right next to Adolph von Menzel's famous "The Iron Rolling Mill". Back then, art criticism placed the work of both artists in an equally appreciative relationship in terms of content and craftsmanship. His works are widely scattered in galleries and museums, mainly in German-speaking countries. The most extensive retrospective collection to date (of 174 exhibits) opened on 21 July 2012 in the Erzhammer Cultural Center in Annaberg-Buchholz on the occasion of the artist's 150th birthday.

Critics said he had a certain naivety in his artistic expression because of his closeness to the people. Köselitz was involved in the promotion of the watercolor technique in Germany.

=== Notable works ===
- Bookplate design for Margareta Geipel, late 19th–mid-20th century.
- "Morning Walk", Watercolor, c.1900.
- Two Designs for Bookplates: Curt Geipel and Rolf Geipel, c.1920.

== Gallery ==
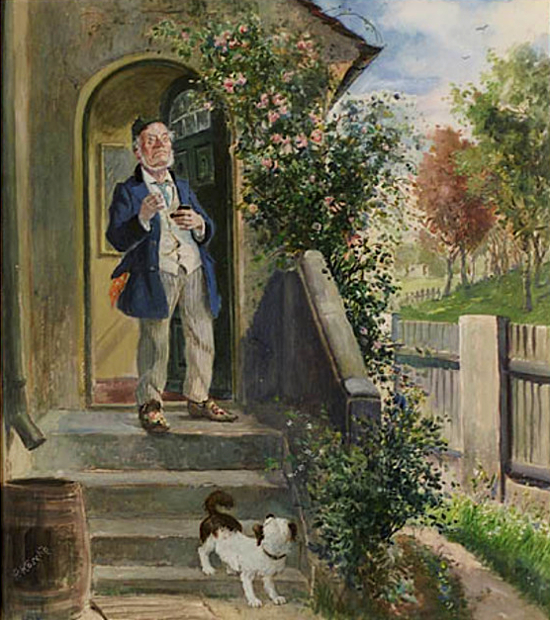
The Morning Walk

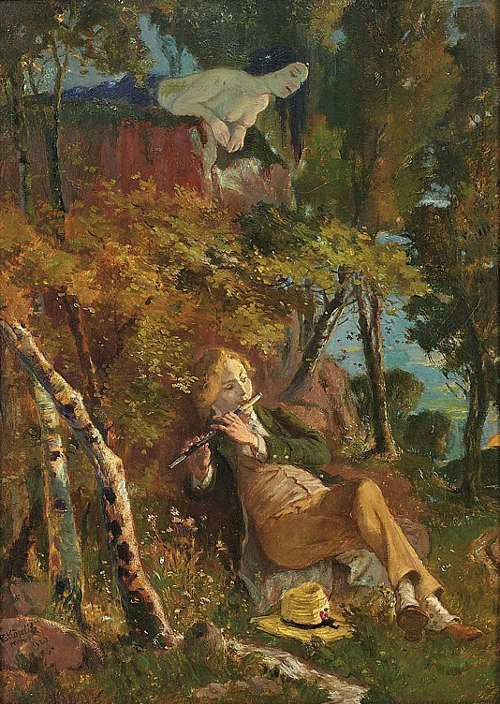
Forest Nymph, Listening to a Flutist

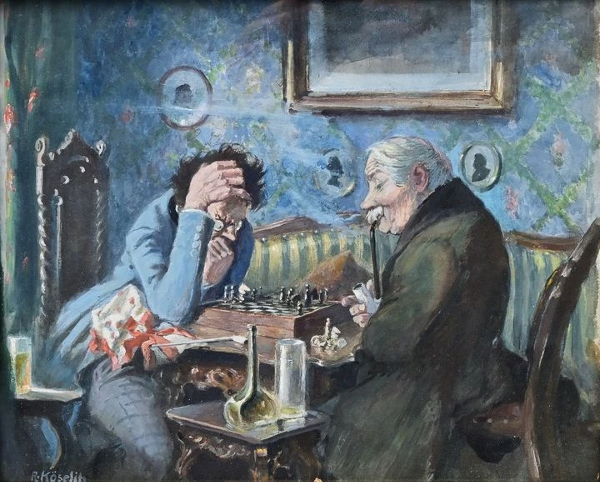
The Chess Game

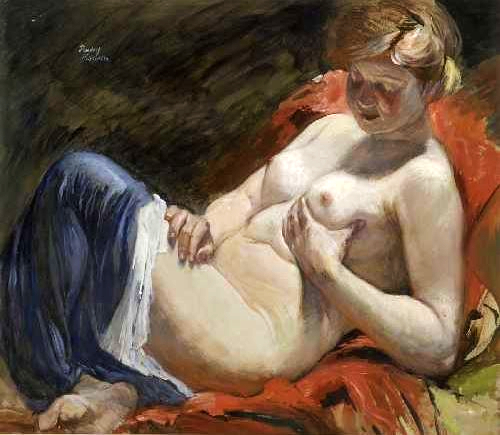
Female Nude

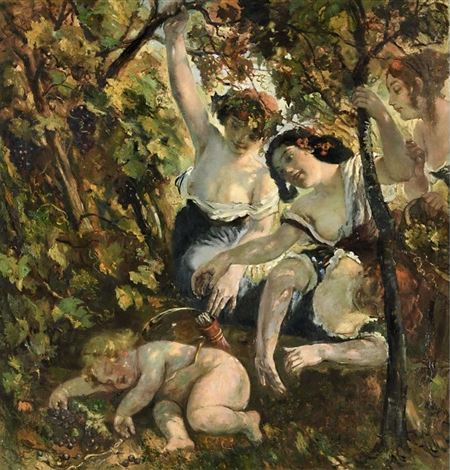
Sleeping Cupid, Teased by Bacchantes

== Bibliography ==
- Hugo Christof and Heinrich Meyer, Heinrich Schaumberger und Rudolf Köselitz, Dichter und Illustrator. J. Zwissler, 1901 - 135 pages.
- Peter Rochhaus, Kurz vor dem Vergessen – Zu Leben und Werk des Malers und Illustrators Rudolf Köselitz. (Streifzüge durch die Geschichte des oberen Erzgebirges, Heft 24) Annaberg-Buchholz, 1998. (PDF)
- Gotthard B. Schicker, Münchner Romantiker – Maler der Erzgebirgsheimat. In: Dicknischl – Erzgebirgsleute von damals und heute. Druck- und Verlagsgesellschaft Marienberg mbH, 2008, ISBN 978-3-931770-76-1
- Gotthard B. Schicker, Köselitz: Weltbürger aus Annaberg – Eine Familien- und Stadtbiographie, ERZDruck, Marienberg 2017, ISBN 978-3-946568-23-0
