= René Reinicke =

German painter

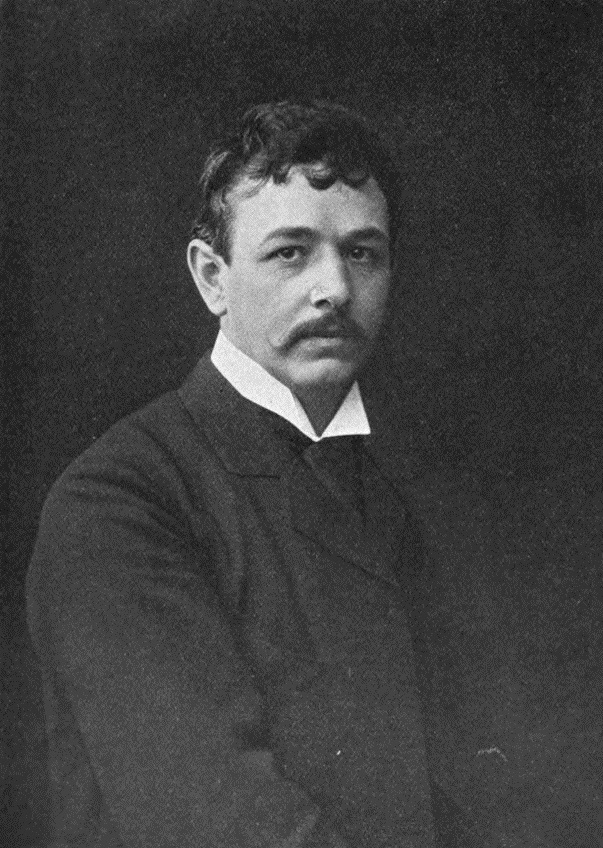
René Reinicke.

René Reinicke (1860–1926) was a German painter and illustrator.

== Biography ==
René Reinicke was born in Strenznaundorf in 1860. He first studied art in Weimar and later in Düsseldorf and Munich. Reinicke worked as graphic designer and illustrator for several well-known Art Nouveau magazines.

He died in 1926 in Steingaden.

== See also ==
- Adolph Menzel
- Eduard von Gebhardt

== Gallery ==
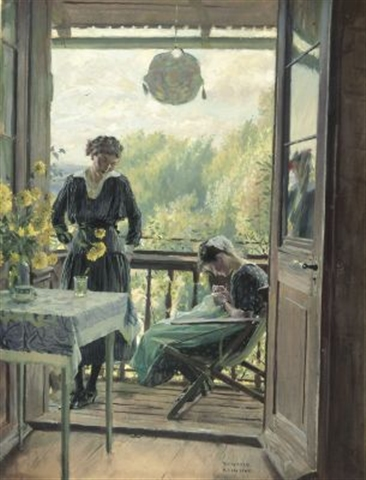

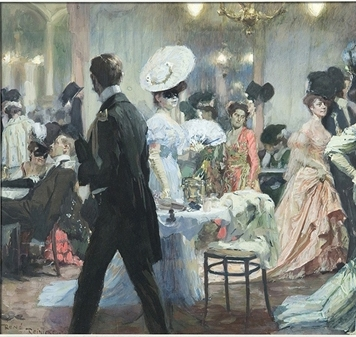

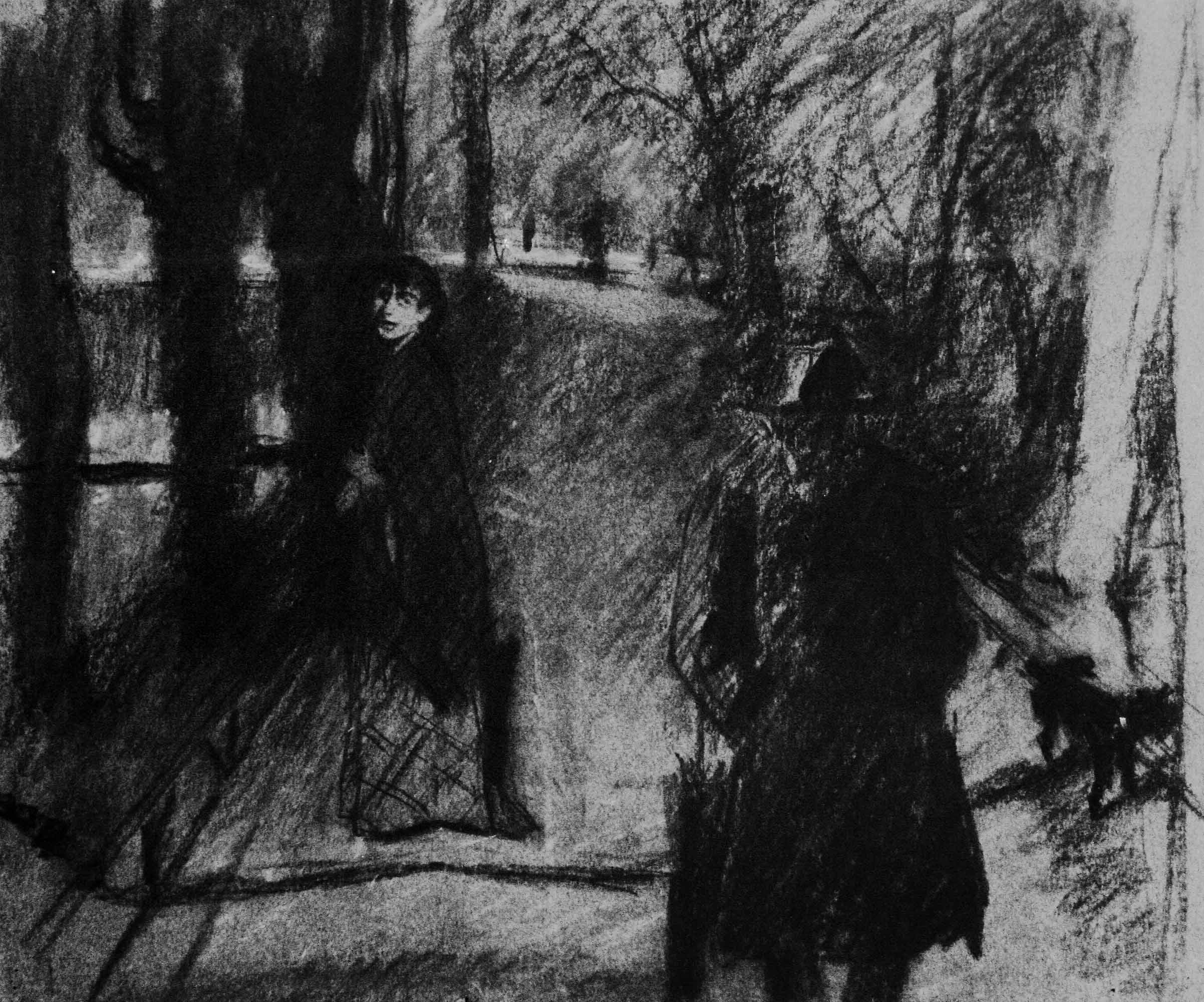

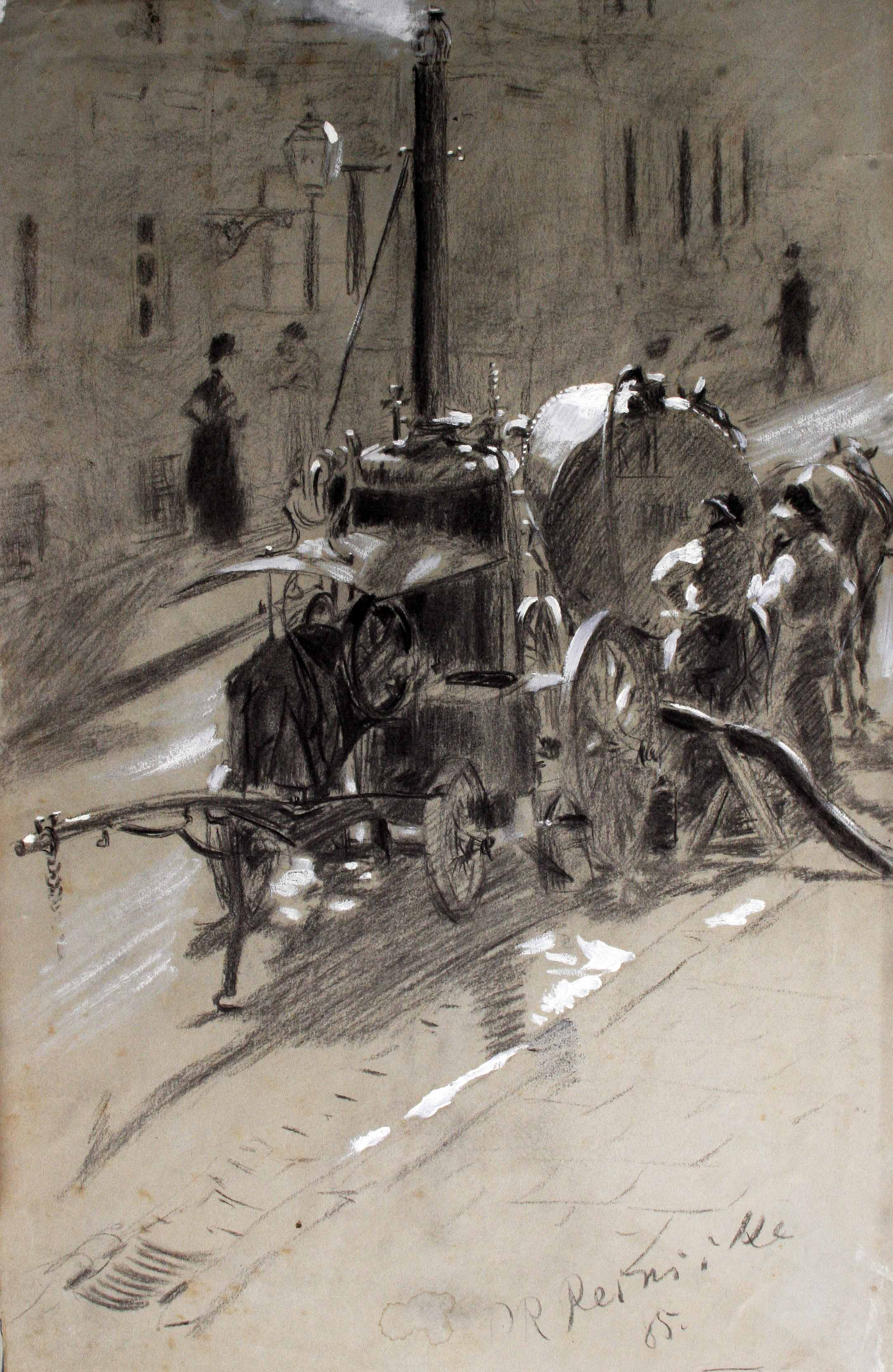

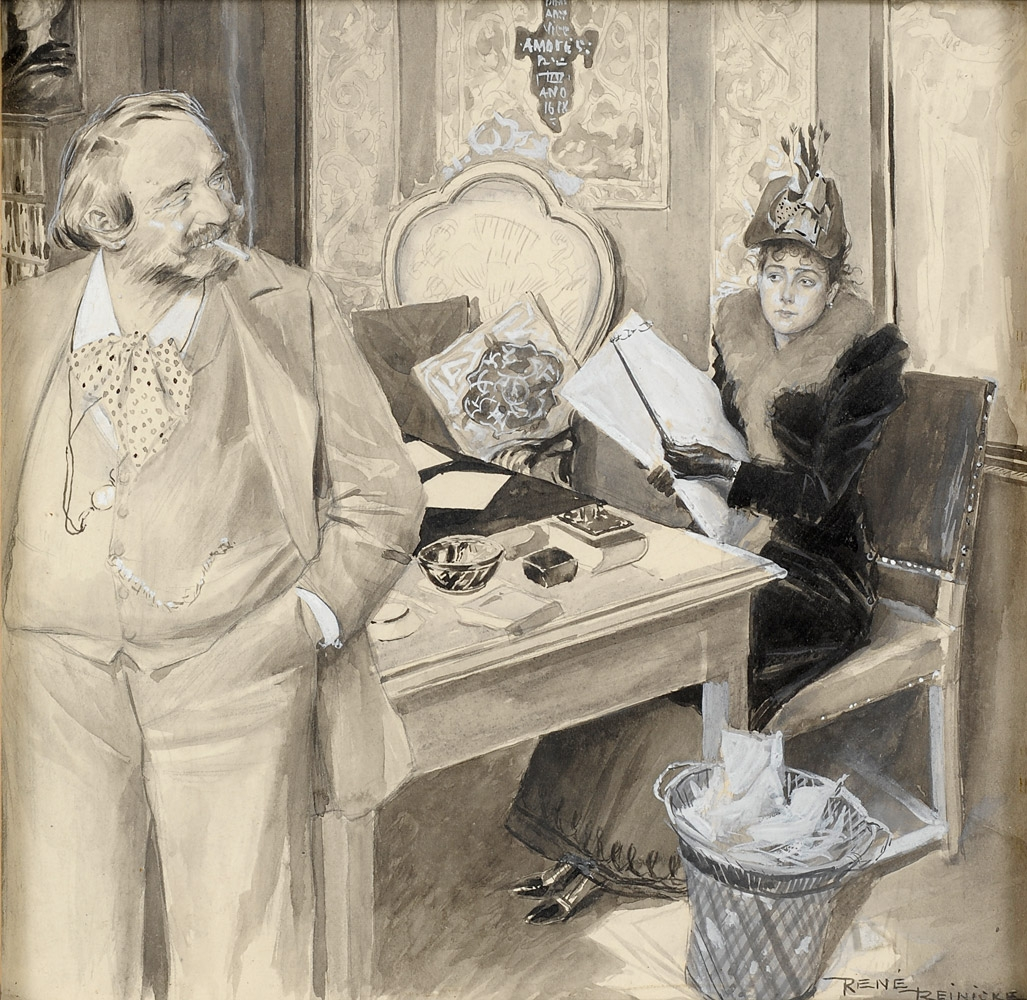
