= Hans Beat Wieland =

Swiss painter (1867–1945)

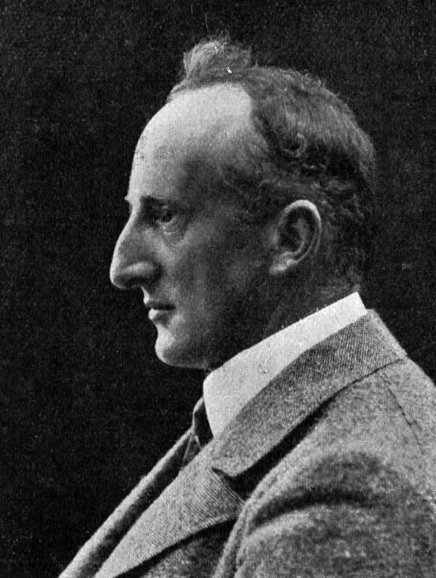
Portrait of Hans Beat Wieland

Hans Beat Wieland (11 June 1867 – 23 August 1945) was a Swiss painter, best known for his realist paintings of Alpine sceneries.

Wieland was born in Gallusberg, Mörschwil, canton of St. Gallen, but he grew up in Basel. He left school shortly before the Matura in 1883, preferring to pursue a career in painting over the school degree. Two years later, he moved to Munich, where he studied first at the private art school of Paul Nauen and then at the Academy of Fine Arts. Together with Michael Zeno Diemer (1867 - 1939), he painted a large panoramic painting for the World's Fair of 1893 in Chicago, and in 1894, he joined the Munich Secession. In 1896/97, he travelled to Spitsbergen to witness the take-off of Salomon Andrée's balloon expedition to the North Pole. In 1898, he married Elsa Henkell, whom he had first met at the Academy in Munich.

Wieland specialized on realist paintings of Alpine mountains. His vividly colored images were acclaimed by critics and became very popular; art prints of his works sold well.

During World War I, Wieland worked as a painter for the Army Museum at Vienna. In 1918, he moved back to Switzerland, first to Schwyz, and then in 1930 to Kriens.
