= 1982 in architecture =

The year 1982 in architecture involved some significant architectural events and new buildings.

== Buildings and structures ==
=== Buildings opened ===
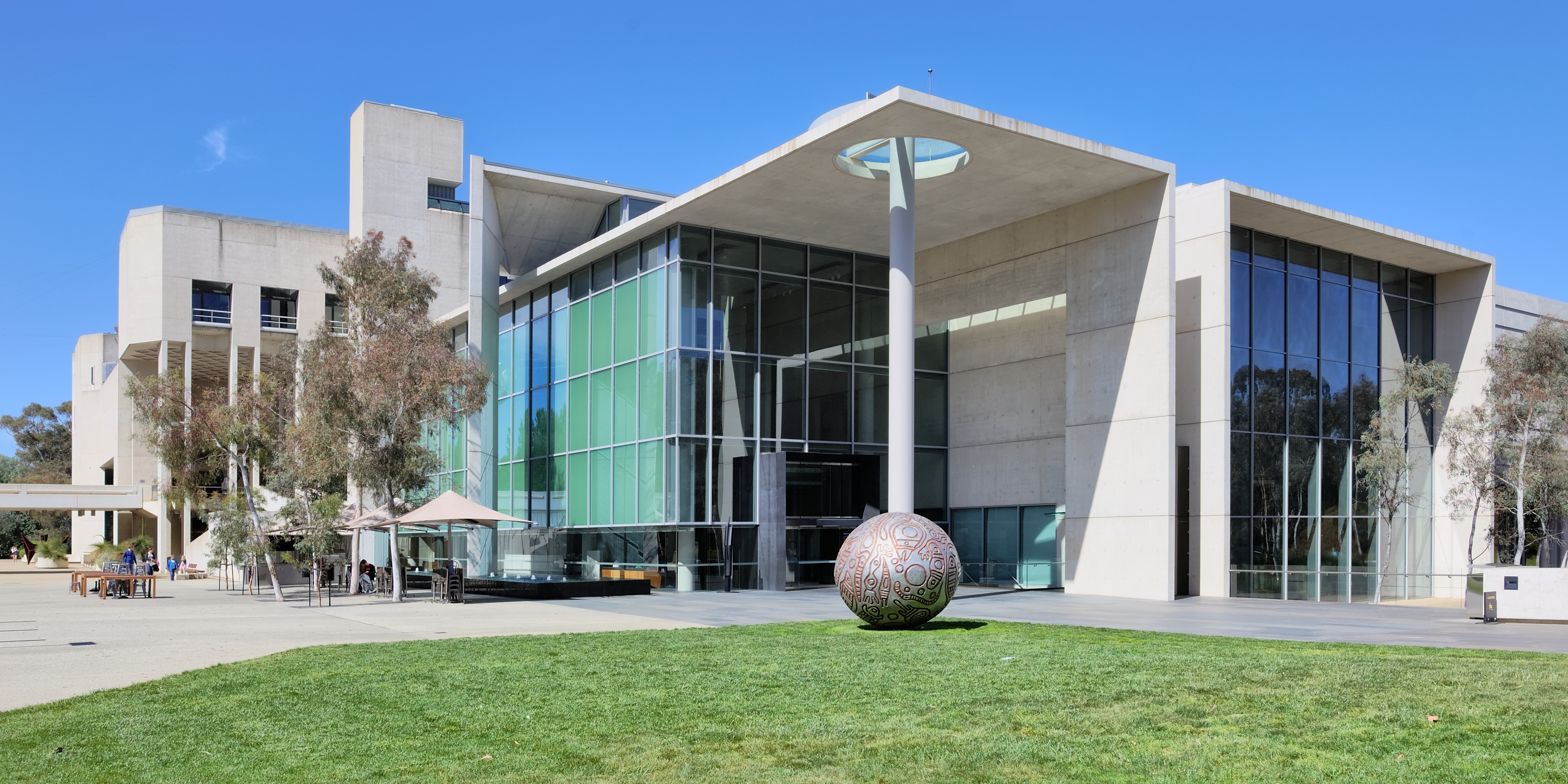
The National Gallery of Australia in Canberra, [Australia

- January 28 – Jatiyo Sangshad Bhaban, the National Parliament Building in Dhaka, Bangladesh, designed by Louis Kahn.
- April 29 – Sri Lankan Parliament Building in Kotte, designed by Geoffrey Bawa.
- June 23 – Abteiberg Museum in Mönchengladbach, Germany, designed by Hans Hollein.
- October 12 – National Gallery of Australia in Canberra, ACT, designed by Colin Madigan.
- November 13 – Vietnam Veterans Memorial in Washington, D.C., designed by Maya Ying Lin, is dedicated.

=== Buildings completed ===
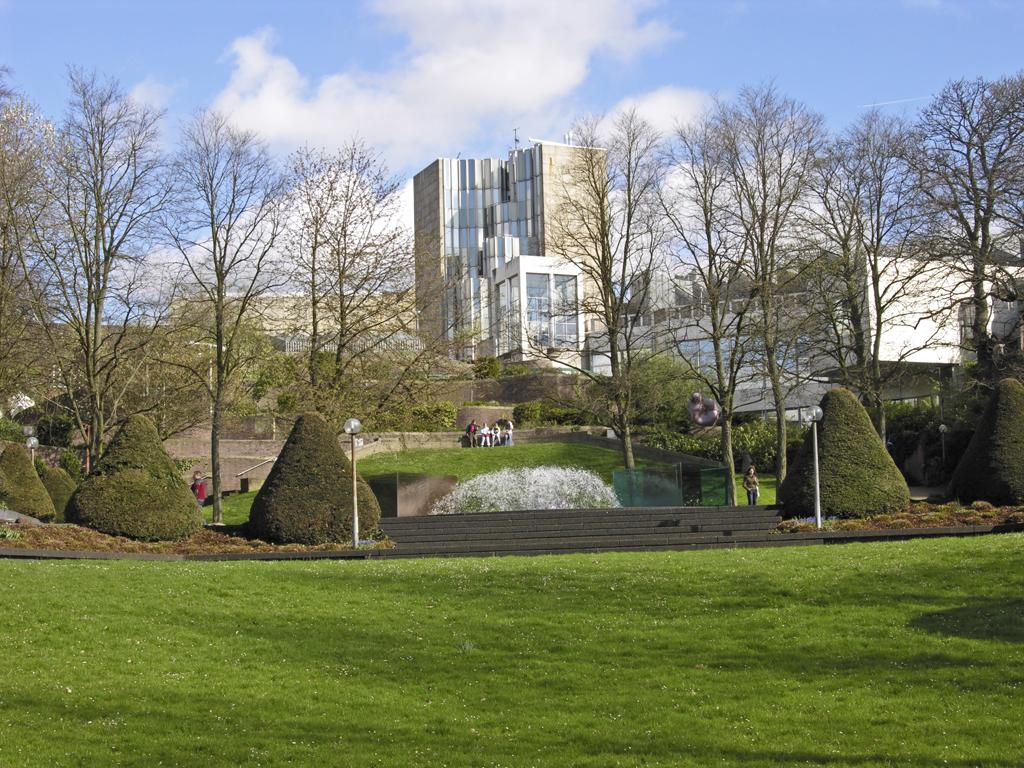
Abteiberg Museum in Mönchengladbach, Germany

Kuwait National Assembly Building in Kuwait City

- JPMorgan Chase Tower in Houston, Texas, United States.
- Rheinturm Düsseldorf in Germany.
- First Canadian Centre in Calgary, Alberta
- Nexen Building, Calgary in Calgary, Alberta
- Kuwait National Assembly Building, designed by Jørn Utzon.
- Rare Books Library, Newnham College, Cambridge, designed by van Heyningen and Haward.
- Hamer Hall, part of the Arts Centre complex, in Melbourne, Australia.
- Georgia Pacific Tower in Atlanta, Georgia, United States.
- TV-am Breakfast Television Centre in Camden Town, London, designed by Terry Farrell.
- Inmos microprocessor factory in Newport, Wales, designed by the Richard Rogers Partnership.
- BellSouth Building in Atlanta, Georgia, United States.
- Tower of the Juche Idea in Pyongyang, North Korea.
- Main chapel of Wat Phra Dhammakaya in Thailand.
- Akasaka Prince Hotel in Tokyo, Japan.
- Atlantis Condominium in Miami, Florida, United States.
- December – Renault Centre in Swindon, England, UK, designed by Norman Foster.

== Awards ==
- AIA Gold Medal – Romaldo Giurgola
- Alvar Aalto Medal – Jørn Utzon
- Architecture Firm Award – Gwathmey Siegel & Associates, Architects LLC
- Grand prix national de l'architecture – Claude Vasconi
- Pritzker Prize – Kevin Roche
- RAIA Gold Medal – John Overall (architect)
- RIBA Royal Gold Medal – Berthold Lubetkin
- Twenty-five Year Award – Equitable Savings and Loan Building

== Deaths ==
- March 10 – Charles N. Agree, American architect (born 1897)
- March 27 – Fazlur Rahman Khan, Bengal-born structural engineer (born 1929)
- April 20 – Şevki Balmumcu, Turkish architect (born 1905)
- May 21 – Giovanni Muzio, Italian architect (born 1893)
- August 4 – Bruce Goff, American architect (born 1904)
- November 8 – David Roberts, British architect (born 1911)
- November 16 – Peter Yates, English architect (born 1920)
- December 18 – Sir Richard Sheppard, English architect (born 1910)
