= Danes Worldwide =

- Formation: 1919
- Headquarters: Copenhagen, Denmark
- General Secretary: Michael Bach Petersen
- Website: Official website

Danes Worldwide, originally known as Dansk Samvirke, is an organisation which represents Danes who live abroad for personal or career reasons. Its activities include educational programmes, local networking around the world, and participation in the public debate on matters relevant its members. The association was also involved in the establishment of the Fredensborg Houses north of Copenhagen which offer lucrative housing to Danes who return home after long periods abroad.

== History ==
Danes Worldwide was founded as Dansk Samvirke in 1919 as an initiative to strengthen the ties between Denmark and Danish emigrants around the world at a time when emigration to the United States and South America was at its height.

During World War II membership increased drastically, peaking in 1947 to 10,000 members. The war made contact to Danes abroad very difficult and many Danish expats, especially in the Far East, lost their livelihood. Dansk Samvirke concentrated its efforts on helping those returning to Denmark. Chairman Jørgen Saxild launched an almost ten-year aid programme ranging from financial support to a social service for those who lost everything.

After the war, in 1949, the association acquired its own building, a property in the diplomatic quarter of the Østerbro district of Copenhagen, which served both as an office and a meeting place for Danes who returned home.

In 1998, Dansk Samvirke changed its name to Danes Worldwide and acquired a new logo, a "Danish globe" designed by Piet Hein.

== Educational programmes ==
=== Danish Summer School ===
Danes Worldwide arranges an annual three-week Danish Summer School which gives Danish children abroad the opportunity to learn Danish and experience Danish culture. It was introduced in 1981.

=== Online Language Lessons ===
Since 1990, in collaboration with the Ministry of Education, Danes Worldwide has been running a programme for distance learning for children aged 6–17 to supplement their local schooling. It collaborates with the Danish Summer School, giving pupils following the distance learning courses the opportunity to take the Danish School Leaving Examination.

== Kronborg Meeting ==
Up until 2012, the association arranged an annual meet-up for Danes living abroad at Kronborg Castle in Helsingør. The first meeting took place in 1935. Although Kronborg is now a thing of the past, the association continues to arrange various events and meet-ups. Most recently in Politikens Hus on September 1, 2015, in celebration of dual citizenship.

== Magazine ==
The association publishes the members' magazine Danes with information from Denmark as well as from the many small Danish communities around the world. The magazine was first published as "Danmarksposten" in 1920. It was re-launched in 2010 under the current name. The last printed edition of the magazine was October 2022. Since then, articles have been published only online on the website www.danes.dk.

== Fredensborg Houses ==
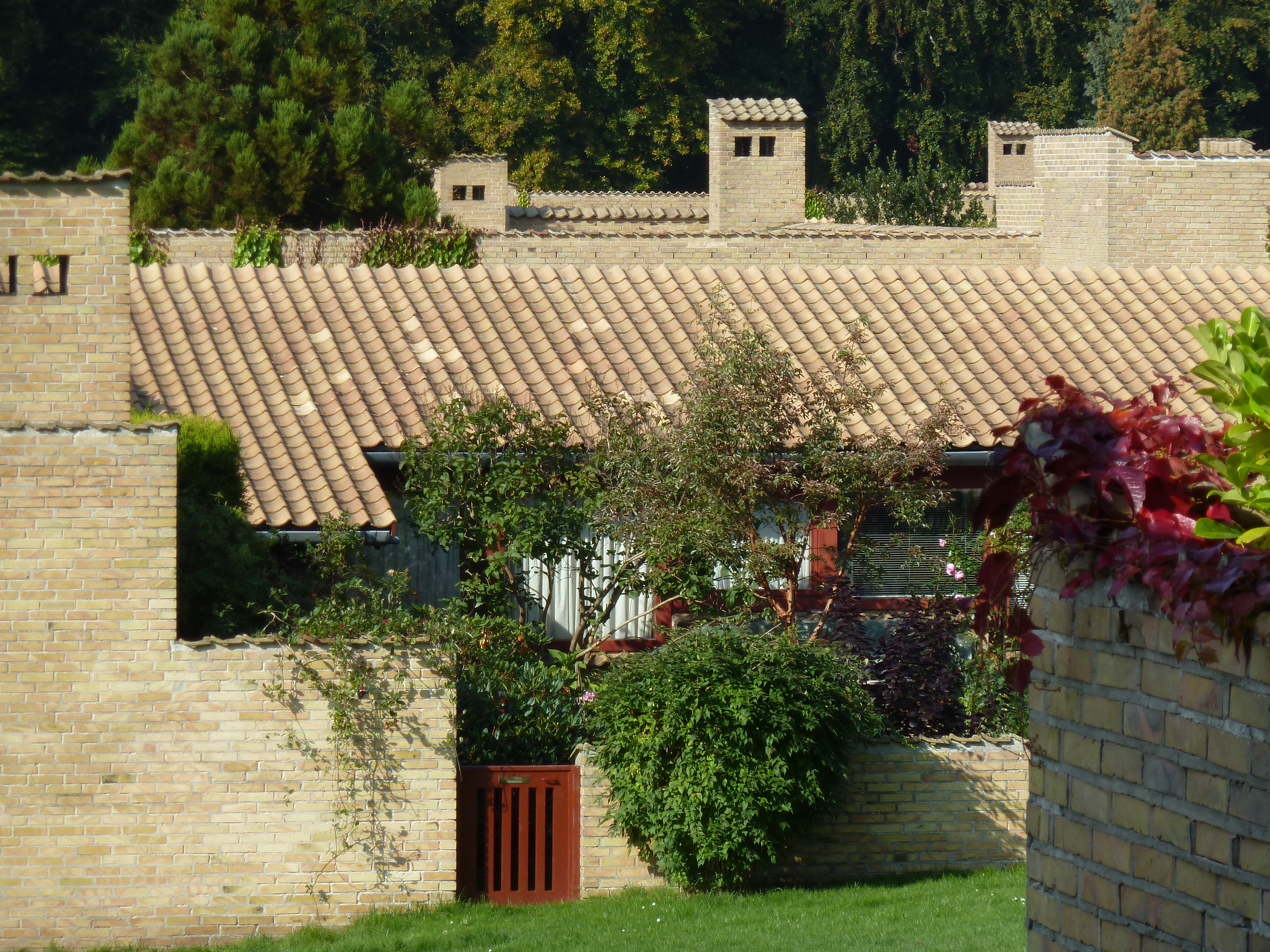
Fredensborg Houses

Danes Worldwide was also involved in the establishment of the Fredensborg Houses, now a self-owning institution, in Fredensborg north of Copenhagen, which provide cheap and attractive housing on a rental basis for Danes who return home after long periods abroad. Located next to Fredensborg Golf Course and Fredensborg Palace, the housing complex was built from 1960 to 1963 to the design of Jørn Utzon, architect of Sydney Opera House. The attached houses come in two sizes, 73 and 130 square metres, and have low rental rates.

== World Dane of the Year Award ==
Danes Worldwide establishes the World Dane of the Year Award in 2008. Handed out at the annual Kronborg Meeting, it honours a Dane who has made a special contribution to putting Denmark on the world map. Recipients have been:

- 2008: Michael Laudrup, footballer
- 2009: Bent Fabric, pianist and composer
- 2010: Lene Hau, physicist

== Lobbying ==
For many years, Danes Worldwide advocated in the Danish parliament for the right to dual citizenship for Danish citizens abroad. This goal was realized in 2015, when a recently passed law took effect, allowing Danes to acquire other citizenships without losing their Danish citizenship. As of 2023, the organization's political goals include easing the rules for family reunification in Denmark, establishing the right for citizens living abroad to vote in Danish elections, as well as improving access to Danish unemployment insurance and pensions for Danish expatriates.
