= Elineberg Housing =

Apartment buildings in Helsingborg

Coordinates: 56°01′43″N 12°43′26″E

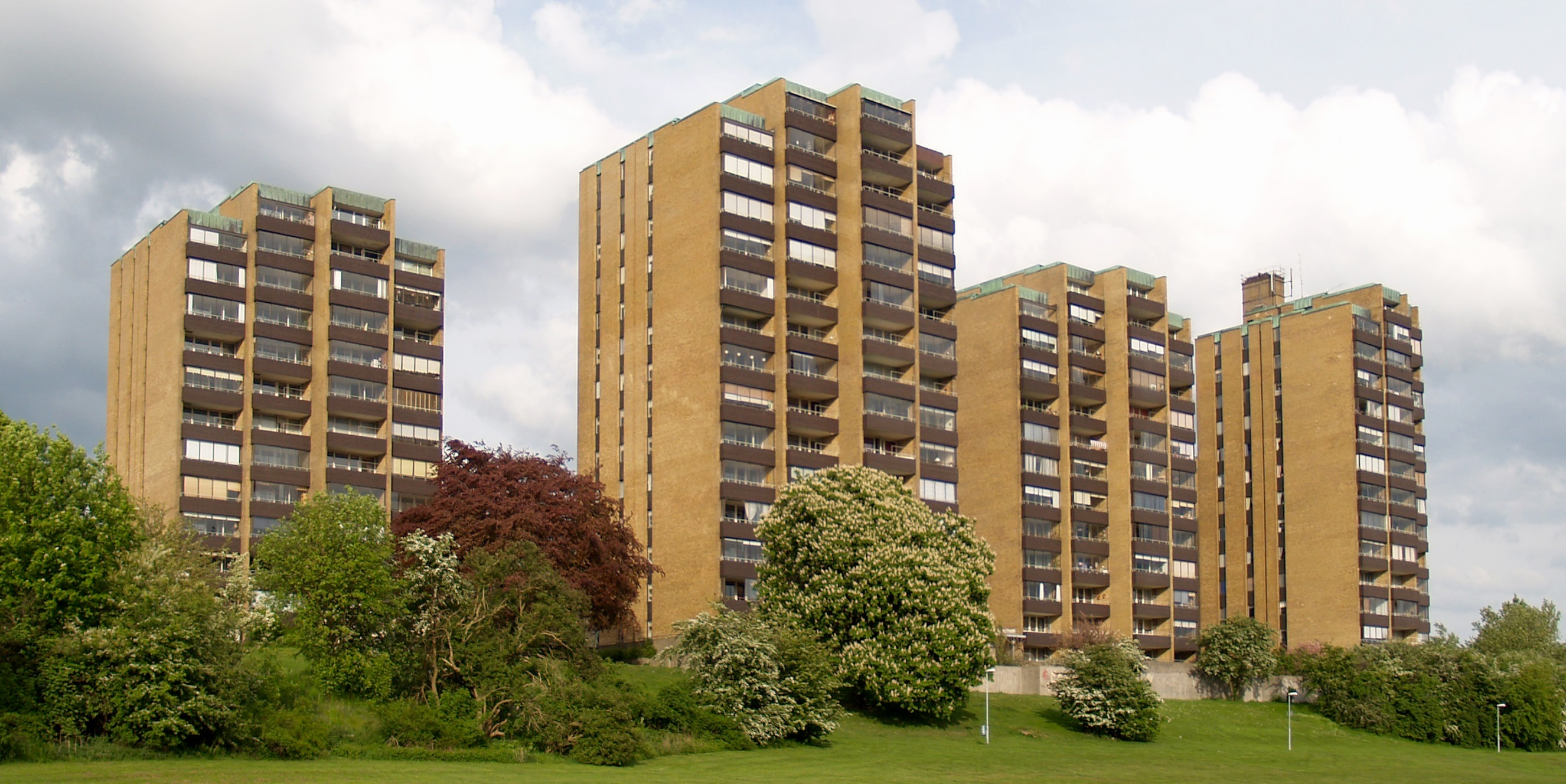
The Elineberg Housing development in Helsingborg

The Elineberg Housing development (Swedish: Elinebergshusen) consists of six high-rise apartment buildings located in the residential area of Elineberg in Helsingborg, south-western Sweden. Completed in 1965, the 13 to 15 storey towers were designed by the Danish award-winning architect Jørn Utzon who, at the time, was working in Helsingborg with the Swedish architectural firm Arton in conjunction with architects Erik and Henry Andersson.

== History ==
In 1954, Helsingborg launched a competition for a development plan including housing for the Elineberg district. There were 19 proposals, three of which were purchased by the city. However, deeming that none of them qualified directly as the basis for a new development, the competition committee launched a second competition, the results of which were presented at the H55 housing exhibition in 1955. After the revised proposal from Arton was accepted, construction began in 1957.

== Architecture ==
The six tower blocks are positioned on a common concrete platform along the edge of a grassy slope running down to a main road. Placed in slightly different orientations, they enclose the Elineberg Square parking area on the eastern side. The three central towers are located to the west while those flanking the sides of the square are further east. The three most northerly blocks have balconies facing west and south while those to the south have balconies facing east and south.

The buildings are made in yellow brick with some brown detailing, the vertical windows being the only feature to break the otherwise smooth facades. The effect is enhanced by the fact that each building is broken into sections depending on the varying widths of the balconies. Despite their considerable height, the towers have an impressively light appearance. The apartments, which were quite small in the original plans, were later enlarged, contributing to the slender, vertical appearance of the buildings. Inside, the apartments on the higher storeys are terraced into slightly different levels, the floor being raised on the entrance side, the lower level leading through to the balcony. As Utzon commented: "You can stand on the 14th floor and look at the beautiful sea two kilometres away." He felt that if the floor was flat, the view would draw attention to the often dull and dreary sky over the Öresund. Another interesting feature is the strutting of the balconies in order to reduce vertigo. The number of vertical struts increases as the towers rise.

== Wind power ==
In 2009, four of the five Elineberg towers were permitted to install small wind turbines, up to 10 metres tall, on their roofs to supply the apartments below. The equipment was to be installed on an experimental basis for up to five years.
