= Kingo Houses =

Coordinates: 56°1′55.59″N 12°34′42.4″E

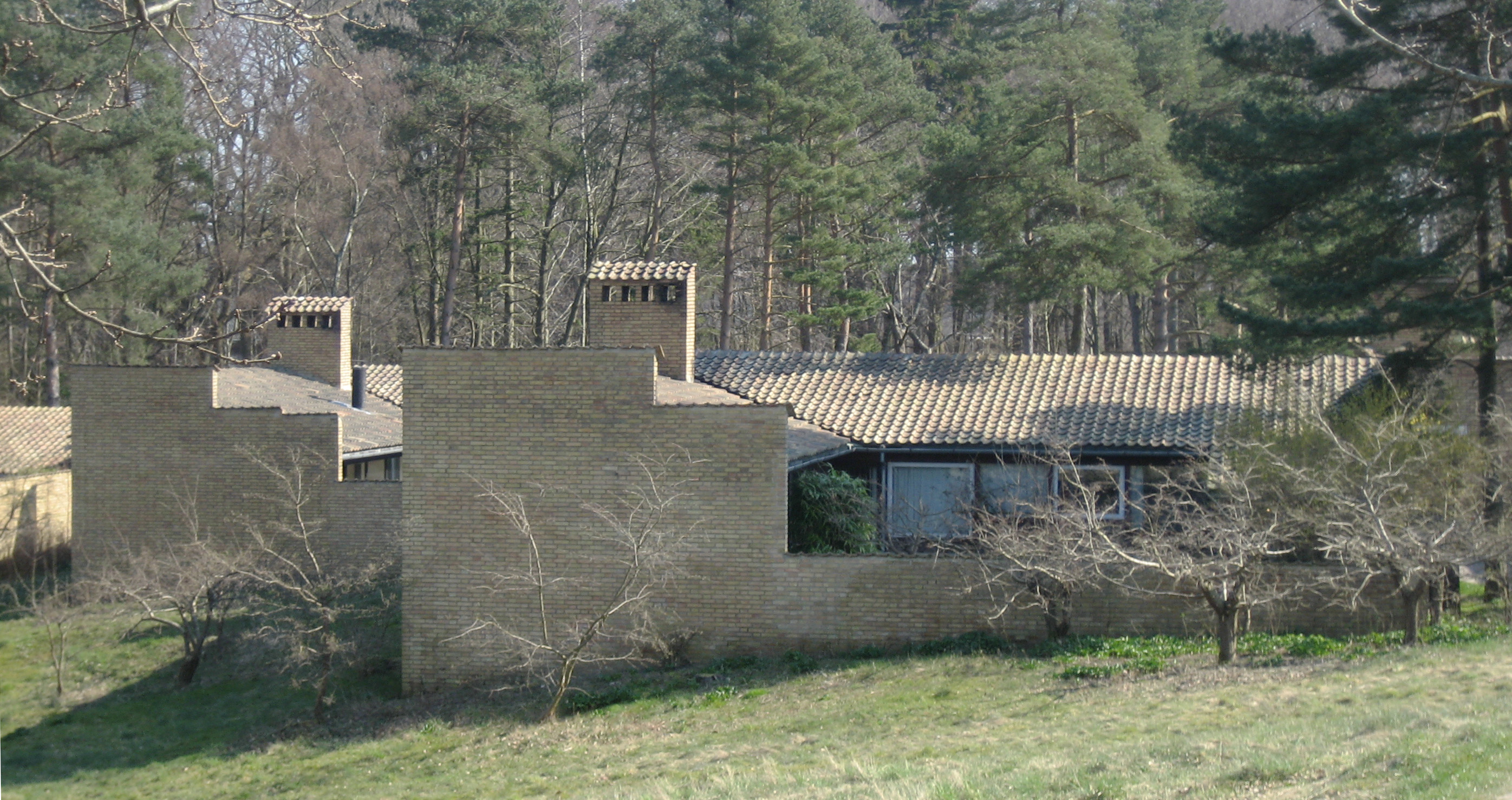
- Interactive map of the Kingo Houses area

General information
- Architectural style: Modernism
- Location: Helsingør, Denmark
- Construction started: 1956
- Completed: 1958

Technical details
- Structural system: Masonry

Design and construction
- Architect: Jørn Utzon

Kingo Houses is a housing development designed by architect Jørn Utzon in Helsingør, Denmark. The development consists of 60 L-shaped houses based upon the design of traditional Danish farmhouses with central courtyards and those of Chinese and Islamic dwellings.

== History ==
The design of the Kingo Houses was based on a competition project Utzon had developed for the south of Sweden in 1953. Although he did not obtain a commission in Sweden, the mayor of Helsingør liked his idea and provided land for Utzon to realize his project.

Named after the developer Boligselskabet Kingo, the housing is currently known as Romerhusene (English: Roman houses).

== Design ==
The development is based on Utzon's additive approach, starting modestly with one unit and proceeding from there, taking into account the lie of the land and the surroundings. Utzon described the arrangement of the houses as "flowers on the branch of a cherry tree, each turning towards the sun."

Each unit has an area of 15 by 15 metres (49 ft × 49 ft), enclosed on two sides by the L-shaped house, and by walls on the other two sides. The small size of the units makes them not only economical but also easily adaptable to the natural terrain. The limited size of the private area is compensated by the provision of a large landscaped communal space. Each house has a courtyard with two wings, one for living, the other for sleeping. Utzon set the exact amount of bricks to be used for the courtyard walls but he told the bricklayers they should build each house individually, catering for privacy, shade, view and enclosure. Built with state funding, the houses were limited to 104 m^{2} (1,120 sq ft) per three-bed unit.

== Influence ==
Utzon drew inspiration for the Kingo Houses from traditional Nordic architectural sensibilities. The design of the dwellings were predicated on traditional Danish vernacular farmhouses. Furthermore, their design formed a prototype for Utzon's second courtyard housing project, the Fredensborg Houses. They have been called the finest Scandinavian example of humane housing.

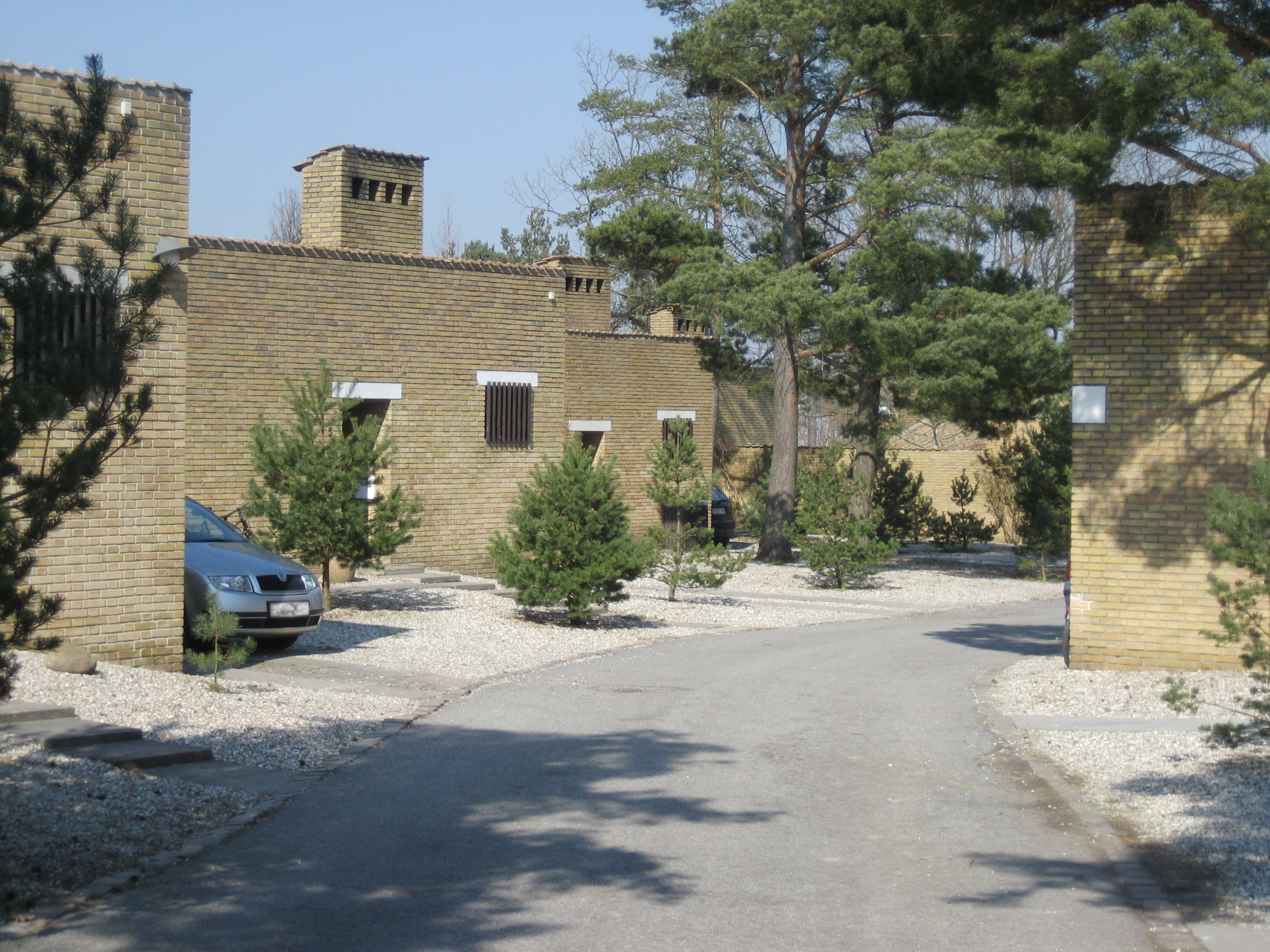
Street view

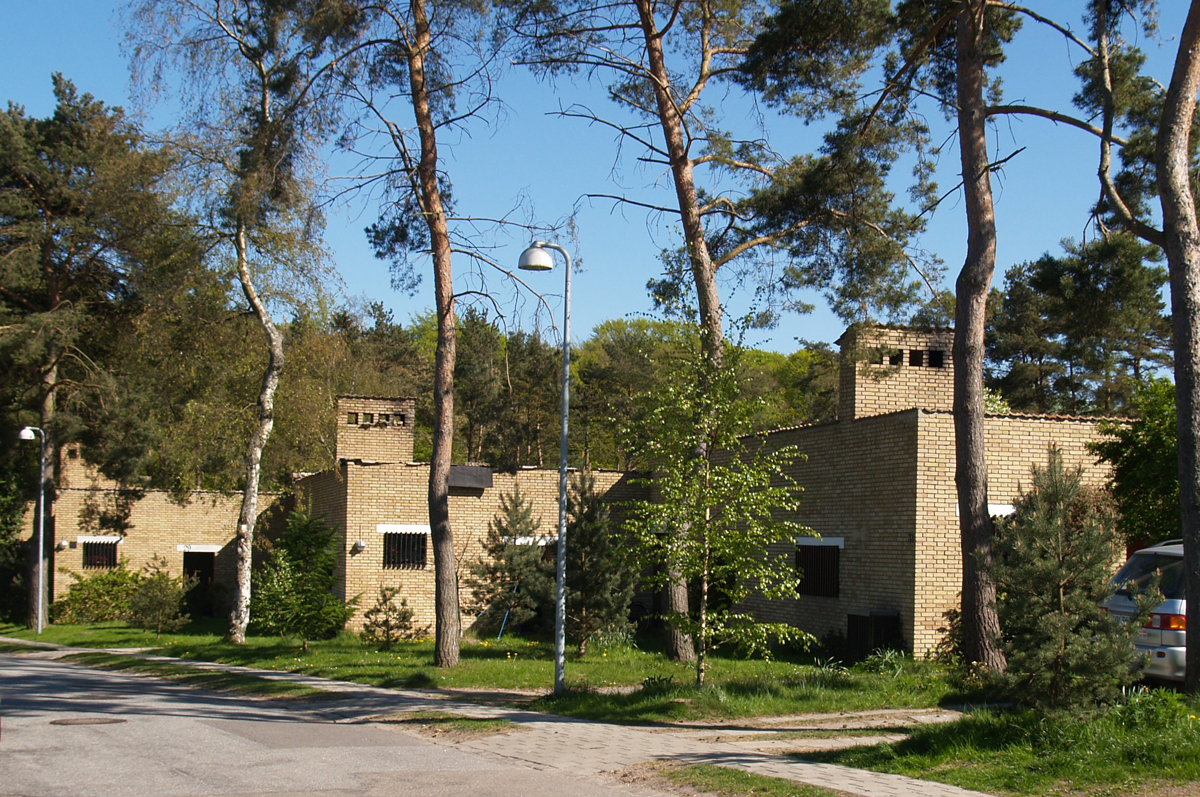
Street view

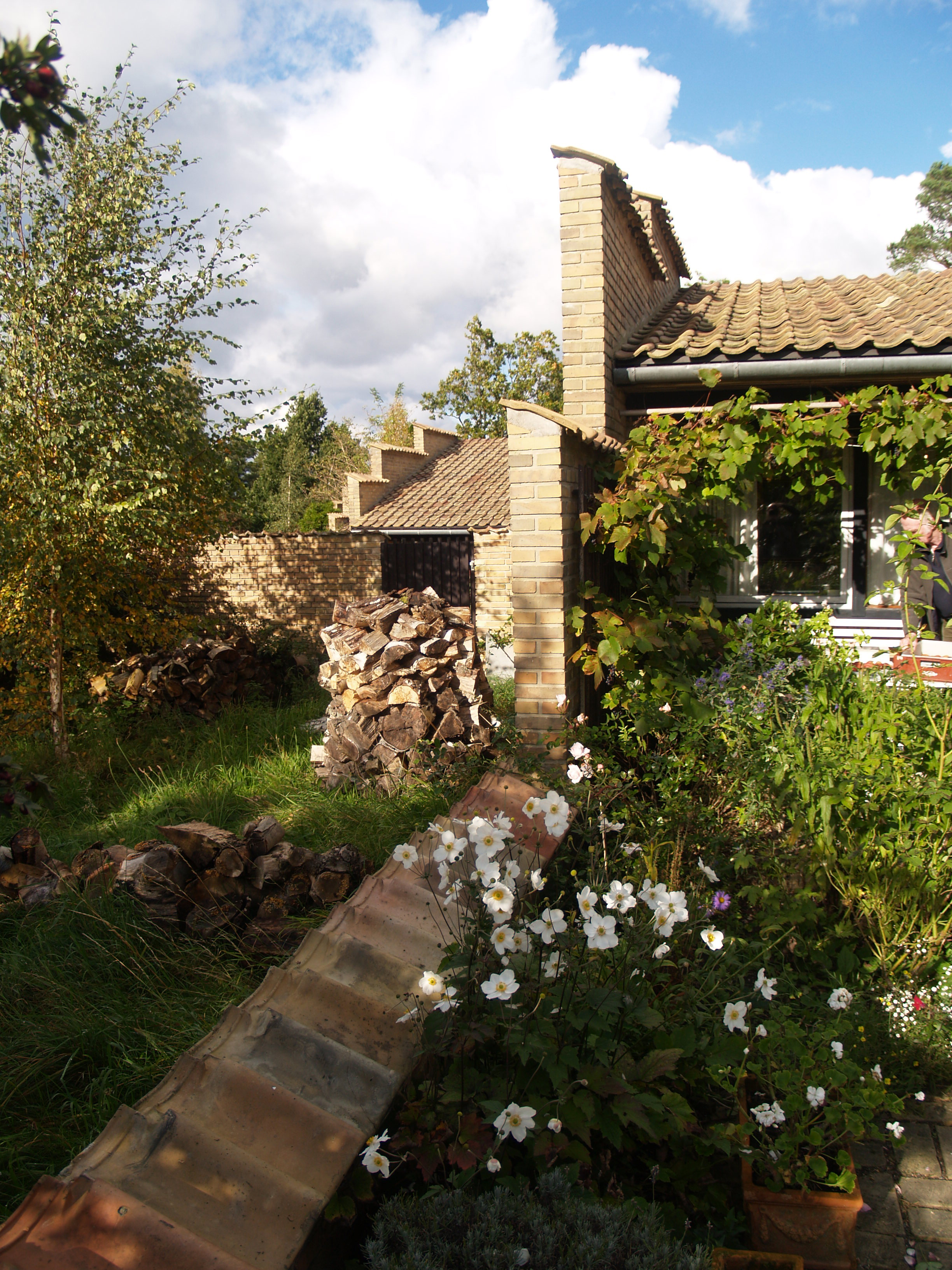
Courtyards

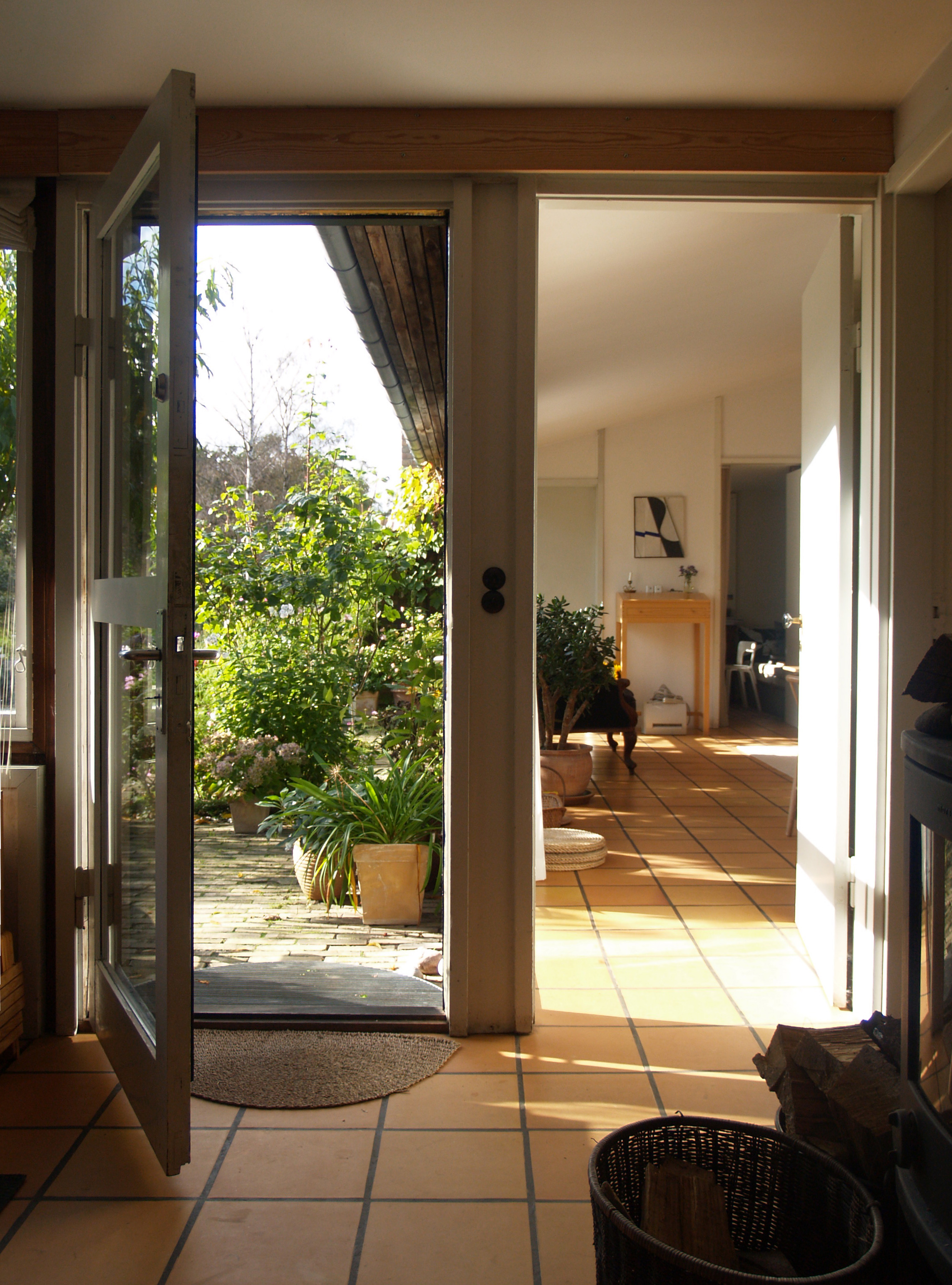
Living room and courtyard
