= Melli Bank, University of Tehran Branch =

Bank building in Tehran, Iran

Coordinates: 35°42′05″N 51°25′55″E

Interior of Utzon's Melli Bank

The Melli Bank, University of Tehran Branch, was designed by Danish architect Jørn Utzon, famed for his Sydney Opera House. The three-storey rectangular building on Enghelab Street near the centre of Tehran, Iran, was completed in 1962.

== Background ==
In 1958, Jorgen Saxild of the Kampsax engineering company invited Utzon to design a branch of Bank Melli, Iran's National Bank. The building was to be located in Shahreza Street (later renamed Enghelab Street) in Tehran's university district. Kampsax, who were very active in the Middle East, had been awarded the contract for the bank and had already secured the services of Hans Munk Hansen who became project architect. Despite the modest fee, Utzon accepted the design assignment as he was keen to become more closely associated with Islamic architecture.

Munk Hansen, who had considerable experience of working in the Middle East, encouraged Utzon to look carefully at Alvar Aalto's National Pensions Institute in Helsinki and at Le Corbusier's High Court Building at Chandigarh. Utzon was particularly impressed by the latter, believing strong lines would also be needed for the Tehran project.

== Architecture ==
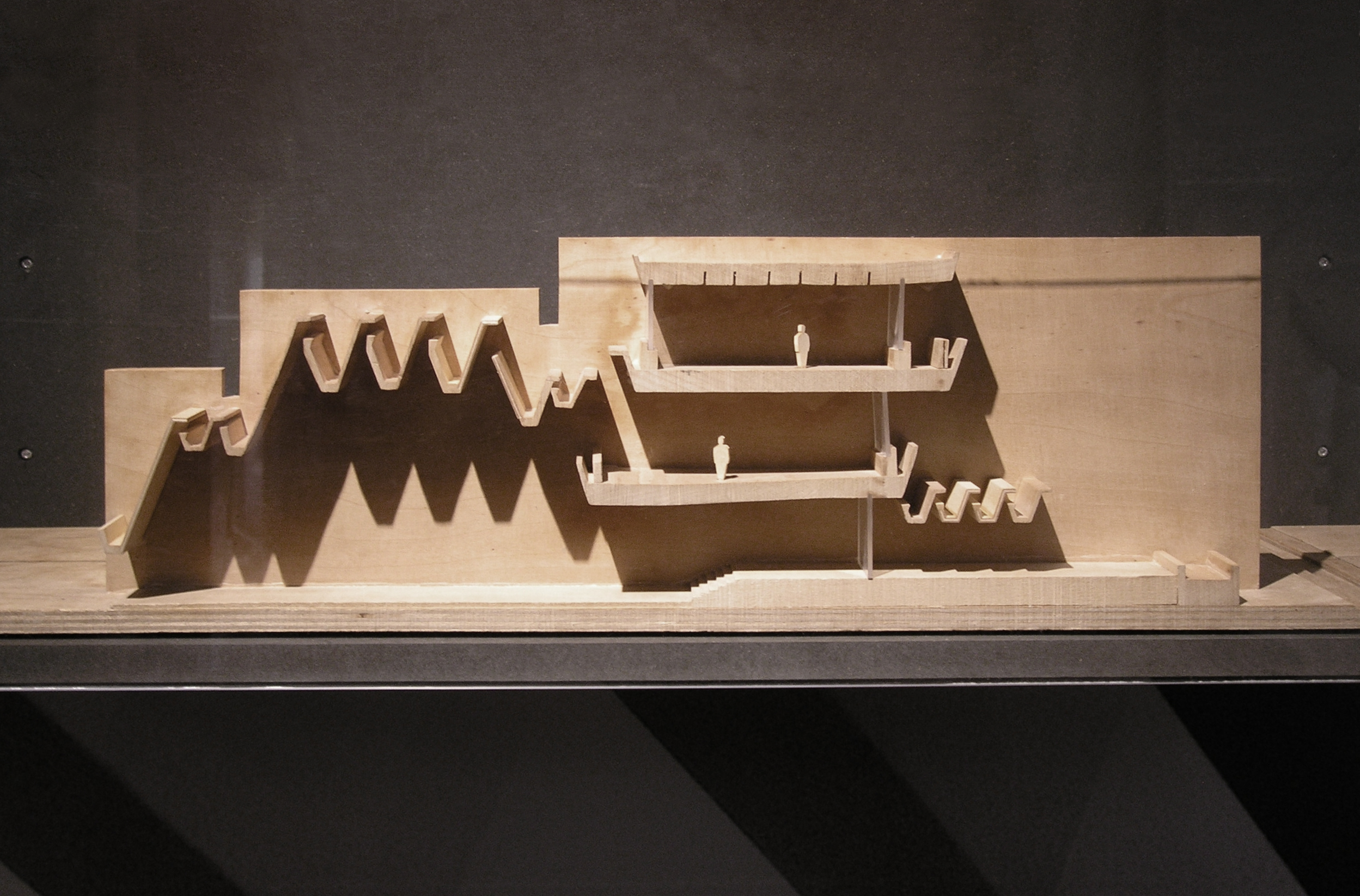
Model of Utzon's Melli Bank

The bank is located on a sizable plot, 26 metres wide, on a busy thoroughfare. It contains a large banking hall with a number of offices. Responding to a requirement that it should stand out from the neighbouring buildings, Utzon positioned it on a raised platform set back from the street. The platform is flanked by projecting walls, forming a small piazza. The two upper levels of the three-storey building are designed to accommodate administrative services and are connected to the banking hall by a spiral staircase. A shaded area, roofed by V-shaped beams, provides a dramatic front to the banking hall. Impressed by Aalto's pensions institute, Utzon had designed the hall as a landscape of desks and small cubicles.

The top lighting inside the building was inspired by the skylights in Isfahan's bazaar which Utzon had visited in 1959. Based on Aalto's project for an art gallery in Baghdad, the roof is articulated with folded-plate beams of various depths allowing the light to enter though narrow slits before being deflected by the deep V-shaped troughs. Utzon wanted the concrete flank walls to be left partially uncovered but shortly after his involvement ended, they were completely clad with travertine. Similarly, the rough perforated brick Utzon had prescribed for improving the acoustics inside the building was replaced with American acoustic panels. The structure is designed to provide complete flexibility in the organization of spaces.

== Literature ==
- Jørn Utzon, Additive Architecture: Logbook Vol. V, Copenhagen, Edition Bløndal, 2009, 312 pages. ISBN 87-91567-23-8
- Richard Weston: Utzon — Inspiration, Vision, Architecture. Denmark: Edition Bløndal, 2002. ISBN 87-88978-98-2
