= Fredensborg Houses =

Housing complex in Fredensborg, Denmark

Coordinates: 55°58′32″N 12°23′40″E

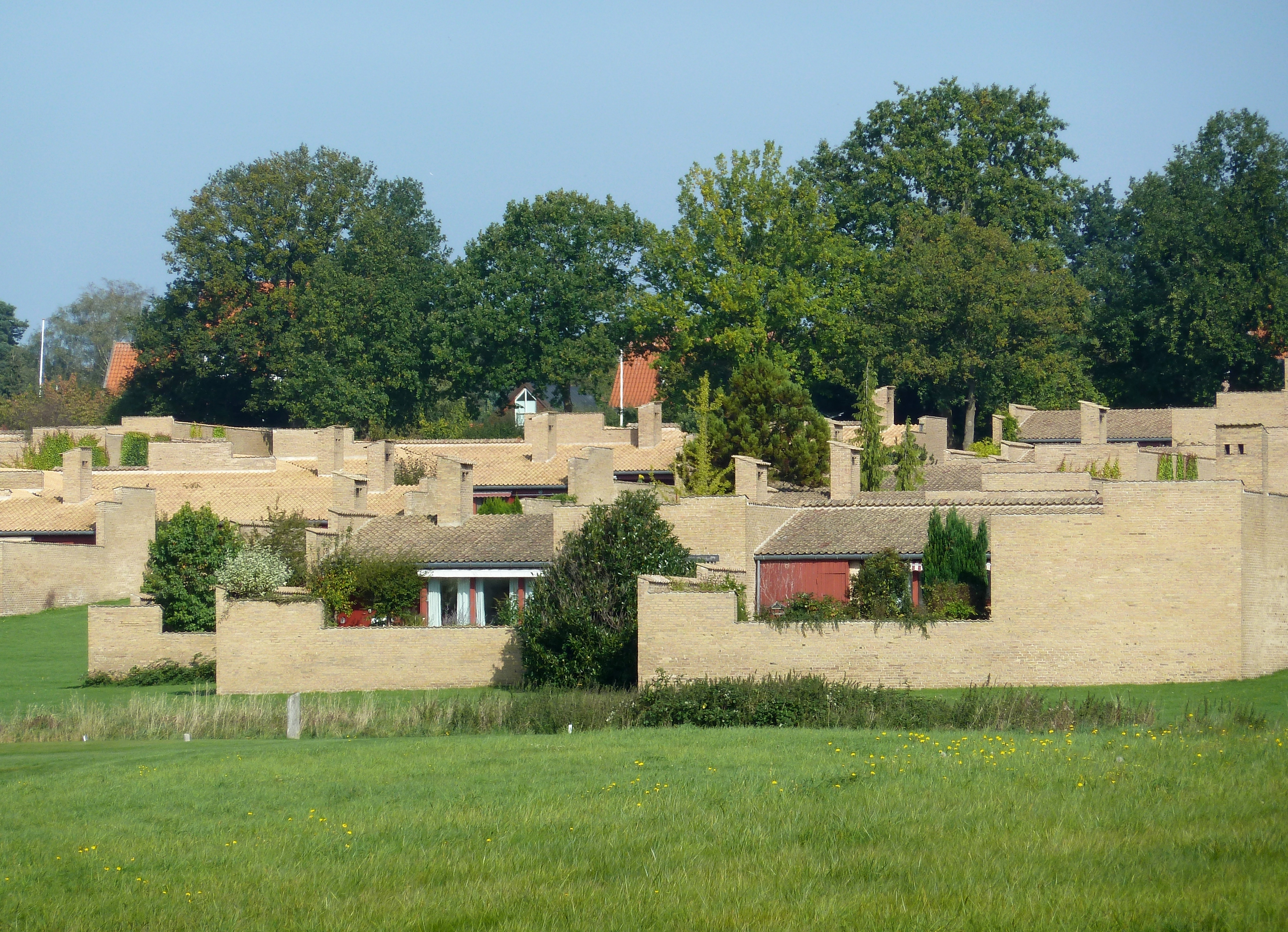
Fredensborg Houses

The Fredensborg Houses (Danish: Fredensborghusene) form a housing complex in natural surroundings on the outskirts of the small town of Fredensborg in the north of Zealand, Denmark. The houses were designed by Jørn Utzon for Danes who have worked for long periods abroad.

== History and architecture ==
The Fredensborg Houses followed Utzon's first major housing project, the Kingo Houses in nearby Helsingør. The 63 units were based on a competition project Utzon had developed for the south of Sweden in 1953, inspired by traditional Danish farmhouses set around a central courtyard and Chinese architecture, in which the houses open out onto a central court but are protected from the surroundings by their outer wall. The development was based on Utzon's additive approach, starting modestly with one unit and proceeding from there, taking into account the lay of the land and the surroundings. Each unit was L-shaped with a living room and study in one section, and the kitchen, bedroom and bathroom in the other. Utzon described the arrangement of the houses as "flowers on the branch of a cherry tree, each turning towards the sun."

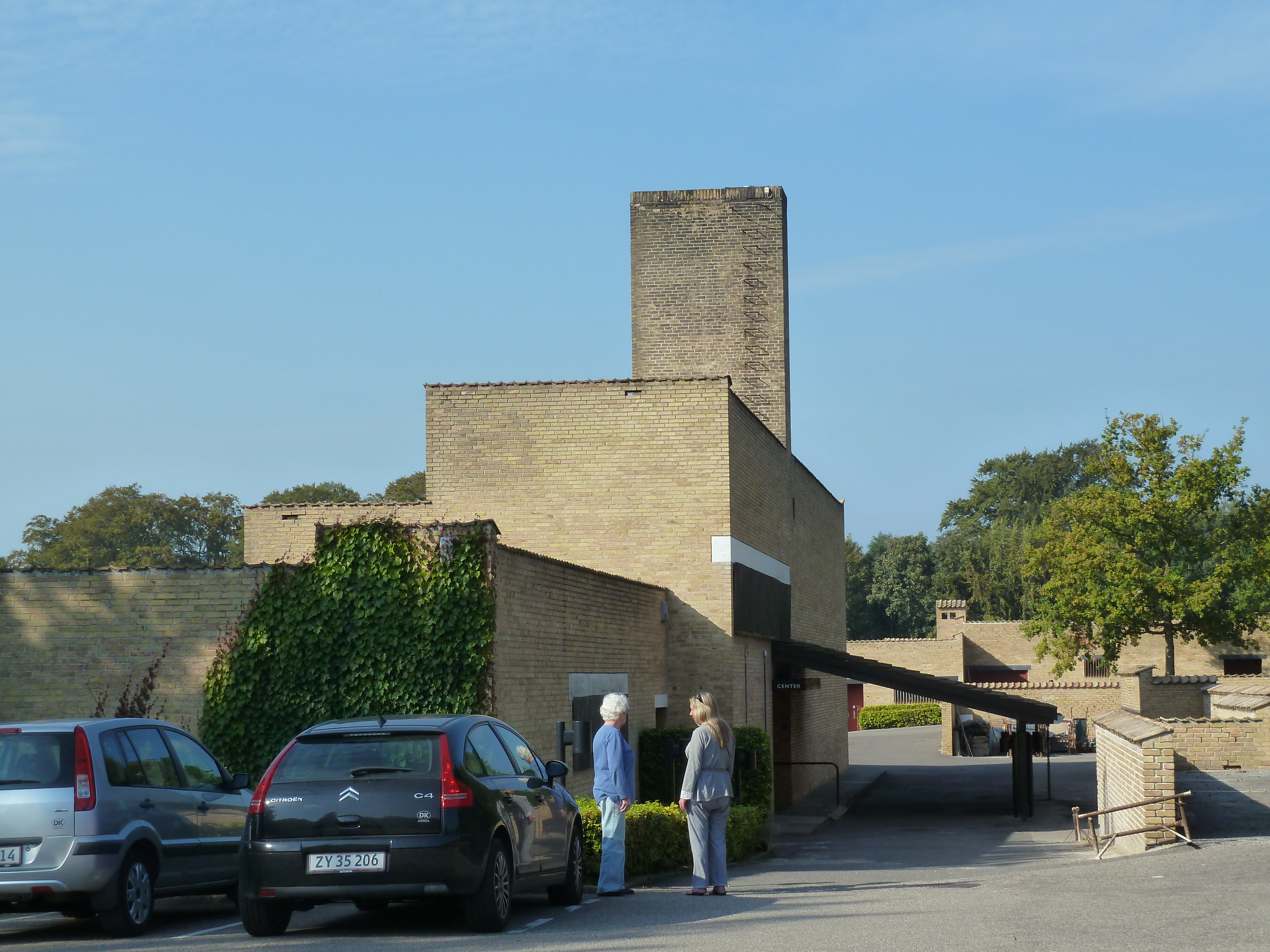
Central building with restaurant, library and guest rooms

As a result of the success of the Kingo Houses, Dansk Samvirke, an organization catering to the well-being of Danish citizens who have worked for long periods abroad, invited Utzon to develop a housing estate where pensioners returning to Denmark could live together and share their experiences. Utzon helped to find a suitable site in Fredensborg, for which he developed plans allowing each house to have a view over a green slope. Partly inspired by housing in Beijing's Forbidden City, the complex consists of 47 courtyard homes and 30 terraced houses as well as a central building with a restaurant, meeting rooms and nine guest rooms. The homes are all located around a square in groups of three, each with an entrance from the square. As the houses are on a slope, they all benefit from plenty of light, especially as they face either south-east or south-west. They give a general impression of openness, which is enhanced by their comparatively large courtyard gardens, even if the houses are protected from the eyes of curious outsiders. This all contributes to a feeling of security and peacefulness.

The complex was completed in 1963 to wide acclaim.

== Subsequent influence ==
Utzon's additive architecture approach to modern housing exerted a considerable influence on subsequent developments. In the Copenhagen area alone, his influence can be seen in Carl R. Frederiksen's Ved Stampedammen in Usserød, Bertel Udsen's Rækkehusbebyggelse in Øverød, and Henrik Iversen's Carlsmindeparken in Søllerød. More recently, Utzon's L-shape floor plan in combination with a small courtyard has been an inspiration for Bjarke Ingels Group's Mountain Dwellings in Ørestad, Copenhagen.

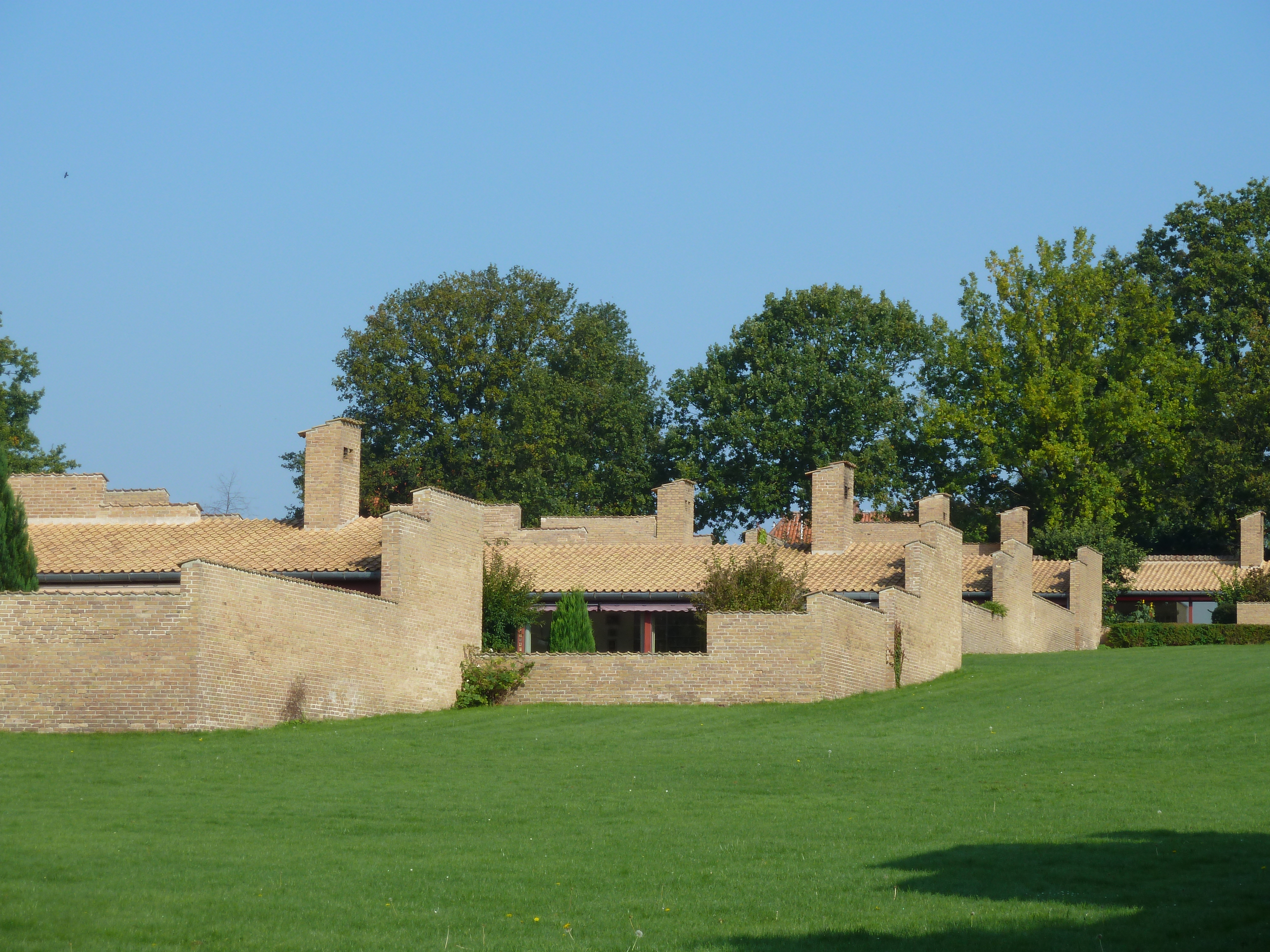

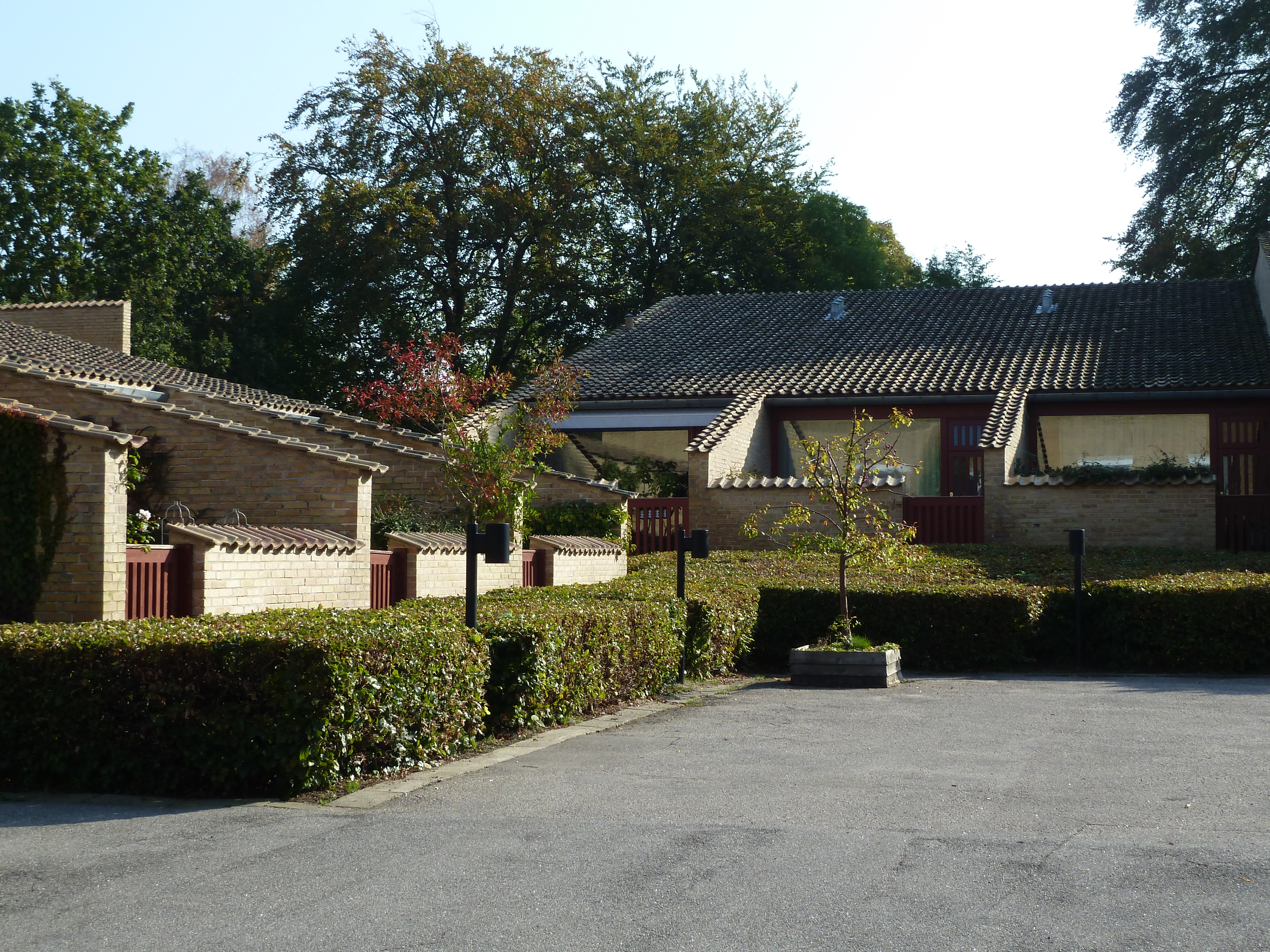

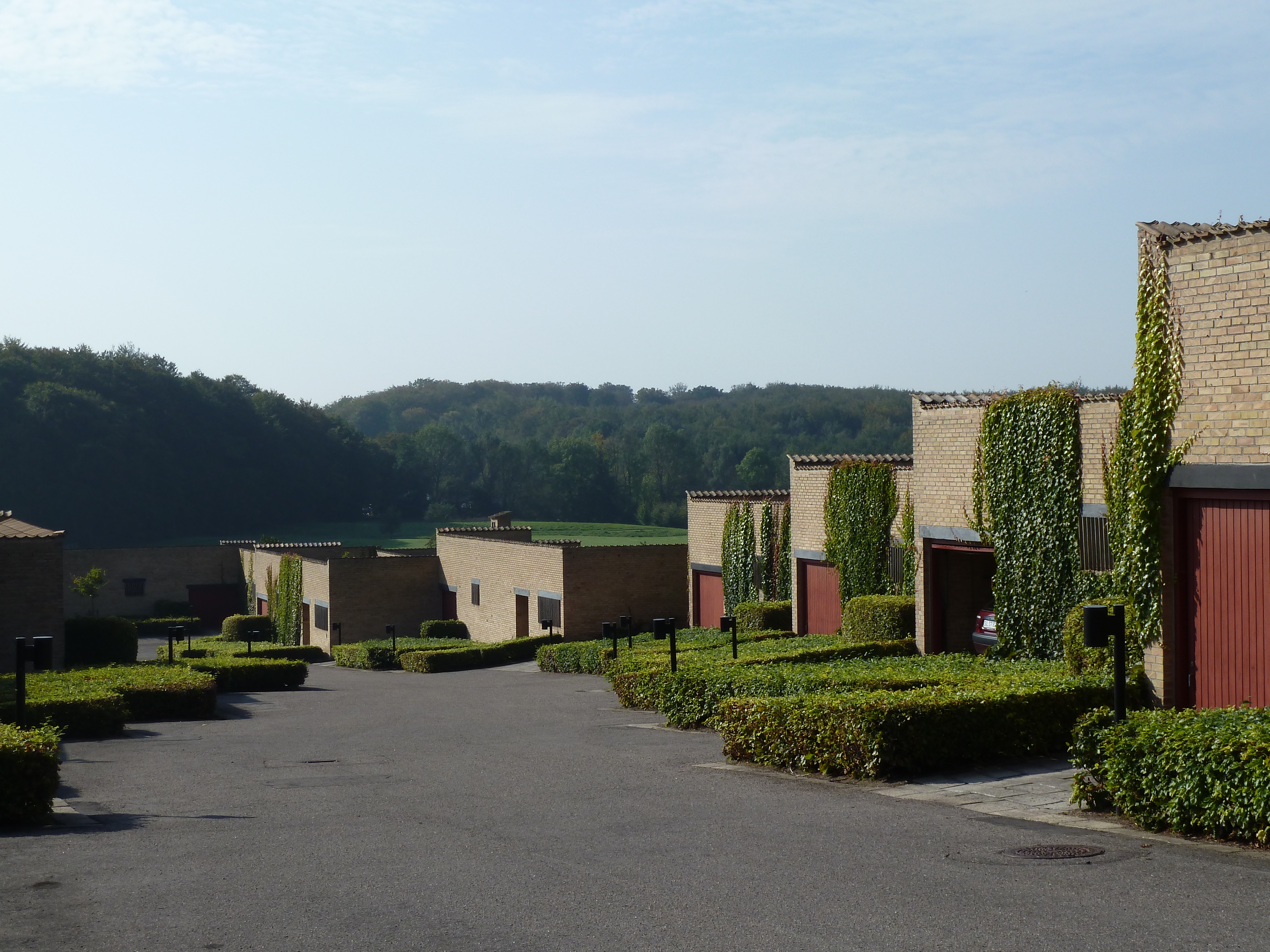

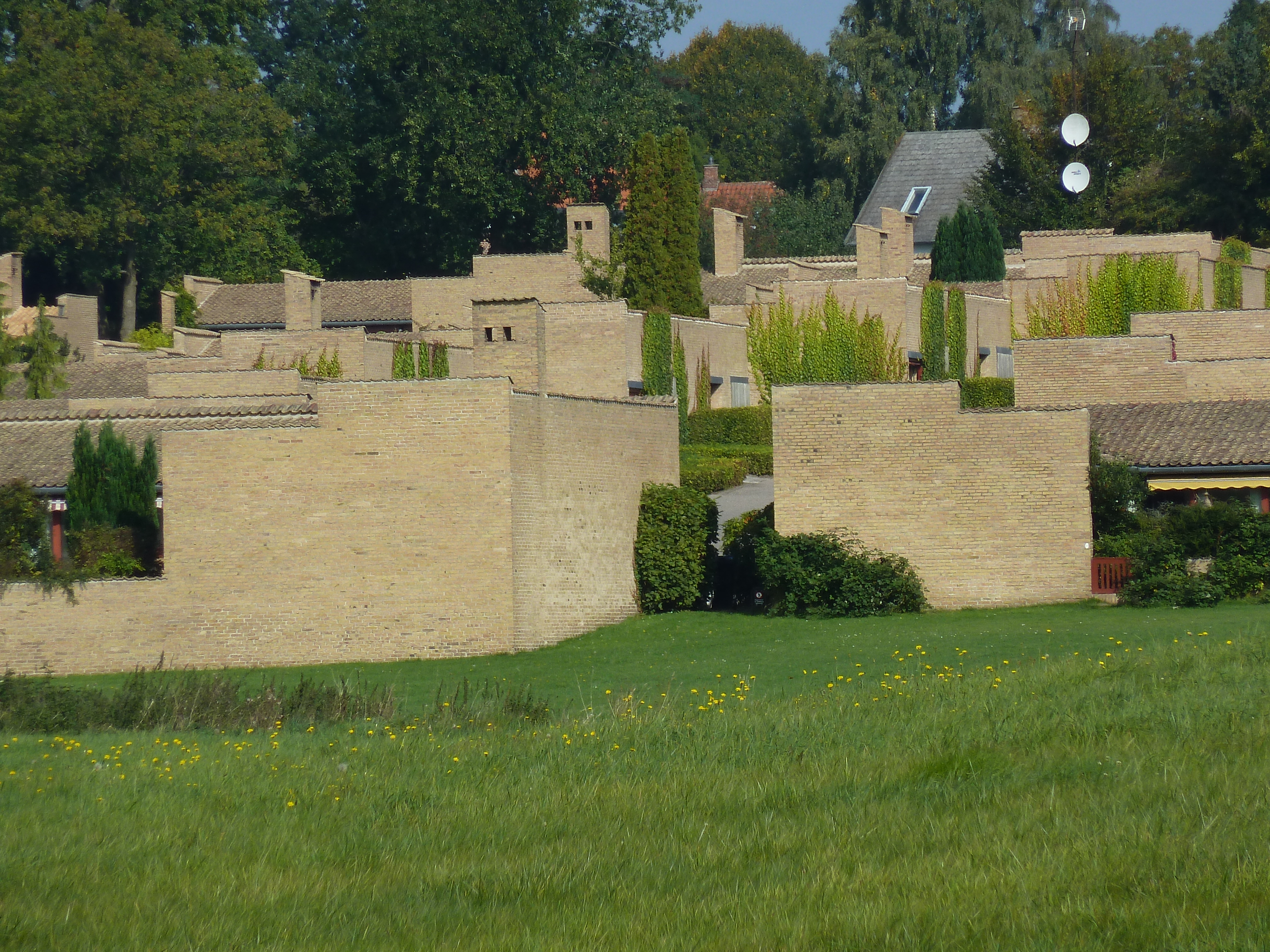

== Literature ==
- Jørn Utzon, Logbook Volume 1: The Courtyard Houses, Blondal, Copenhagen, 2004, 180 pages. ISBN 87-91567-01-7
- Tobias Faber, Jørn Utzon, Houses in Fredensborg, Berlin, Ernst & Sohn, 1991, 57 pages. ISBN 3-433-02702-1
