= Kuwait National Assembly Building =

Legislative building

Coordinates: 29°22′13″N 47°57′51″E

Kuwait National Assembly building

The Kuwait National Assembly Building is the building that housed the National Assembly of Kuwait.

Designed by Danish architect Jørn Utzon in 1972, it was completed in 1982 under the direction of his son Jan. The structural design was by Max Walt. The building was seriously damaged in February 1991 when retreating Iraqi troops set it on fire but has since been restored.

== Background ==
In late 1969, as part of a plan to construct new institutions following independence, the Kuwait authorities invited Jørn Utzon to participate in a competition for a National Assembly building to be located on Arabian Coast Street on the city's waterfront. Utzon, who was living in Hawaii at the time, prepared preliminary sketches which he sent to Oktay Nayman in London, who made construction drawings, and to his son Jan in Denmark who produced models.

Familiar with Islamic architecture, Utzon based his competition design on a walled miniature city consisting of departments arranged around courtyards and accessed through a central hall, rather like a souk. In his own words, "We had the idea of constructing the building around a central hall, a bazaar street, in such a way that all departments met in side roads off the bazaar road, just as we know from the bazaars in the Middle East and North Africa..." The hall led through to a ceremonial entrance beside a covered square facing the sea. The complex consisted of a parliamentary chamber, a large conference hall, each with sag roofs, and a free-standing, flat-roofed mosque. Together with the covered square, they formed the corners of an incomplete rectangle. After discussions with the Kuwait authorities, costs had to be lowered to a point at which Utzon realized it would no longer be possible to use a Danish engineer. He fell back on Max Walt from Zurich who agreed to accept a more modest fee, for his services both as structural engineer for the project and draftsman for the construction drawings.

National Assembly: shaded entrance area

Utzon worked on the project for almost three years before deciding, at a late stage in the planning, that the structural elements should be round rather than rectilinear. He immediately demonstrated his new approach by lining up beer bottles. The new columns were tapered cylinders creating colonnades reminiscent of ancient Greece or Egypt. Cylindrical vaulting was also to be used for the ceiling of the central hall, giving the building the appearance of flowing fabric.

After further delays, in 1975 the Emir of Kuwait finally gave the go ahead for construction to begin. Utzon moved to Zurich together with Oktay Nayman, Børge Nielsen and his son Jan and set up office next door to Max Walt, facilitating communications. Adopting an additive approach, he was able to standardize the design approach as the drawings could be based on repetitive grids. However, further modifications to the overall design were still to come. It was decreed that the conference hall should now be eliminated and the mosque should be brought inside the complex. It was even suggested that the covered square should be removed but Utzon was successful in keeping it, explaining that it was "an architectonically necessary link between the great open natural space over the sea and the enclosed building."

Construction work finally began in July 1978. It had been decided to make maximum use of precast concrete components, facilitating the best use of local resources. Apart from the elements for the two wide-span roofs, which were cast on site and moved into position on so-called "railway tracks", all the components were indeed prefabricated in standard sizes. The building was completed in 1982.

== Architecture ==
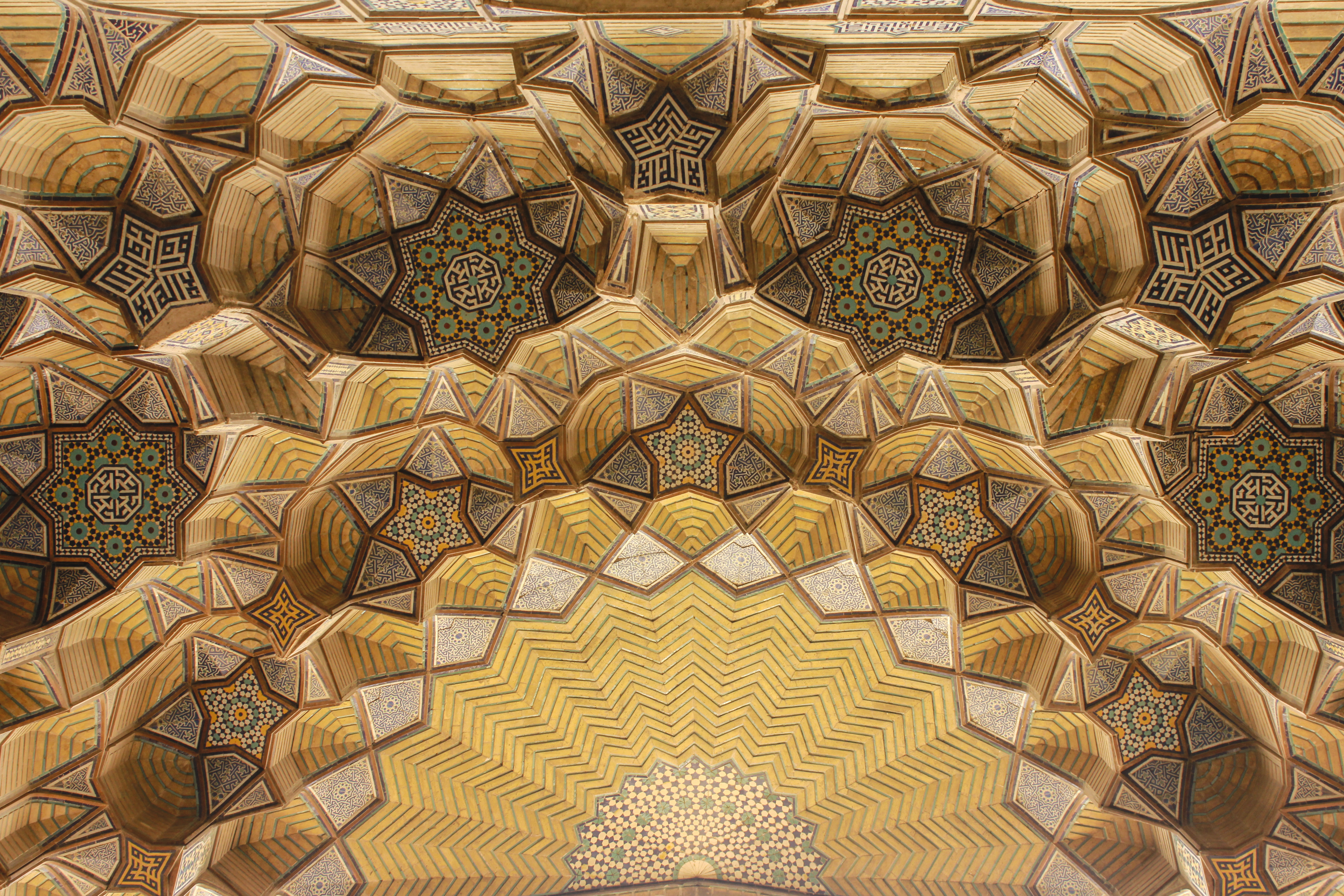
The bazaar in Isfahan, Iran

The Islamic design of the Kuwait National Assembly was inspired by Utzon's visit to Iran in 1959. In Isfahan, he was particularly impressed by the structure of the town. His plans for the Assembly with its central axis in the form of a covered main street are reminiscent of Isfahan's enormous dome-covered bazaar. Like traditional Islamic architecture, Utzon's interior, including the debating chamber, has no windows while the offices are illuminated only from the courtyards. Indirect light is provided to corridors, the library and the cafeteria by means of skylights in the form of half-barrel vaults which can be seen jutting up from the flat roof. The complex is also inspired by the expansive structure of a tree: the central walkway, 130 m long and 10 m wide, serves as the trunk with corridors and stairs — the branches — supporting ministerial rooms and offices as their foliage.

The overall area of the complex is 18,000 square metres (150 m by 120 m). The main structure consists of a basement housing the services and two upper levels with offices, reception, meeting rooms, the library and the cafeteria. In the centre is the vast assembly chamber, 82 m by 34 m, with 50 seats for the members and the possibility of expansion to 150 seats. The upper tiers offer 1,000 places for observers and spectators. The public square, similar in structure to the assembly hall, has a huge roof covering the entrance to the complex. Apart from these two halls, all the structures in the complex are in reinforced concrete consisting of 12,800 specially shaped precast elements made up of 150 basic types. All the elements are of white cement concrete with a smooth exposed concrete finish.

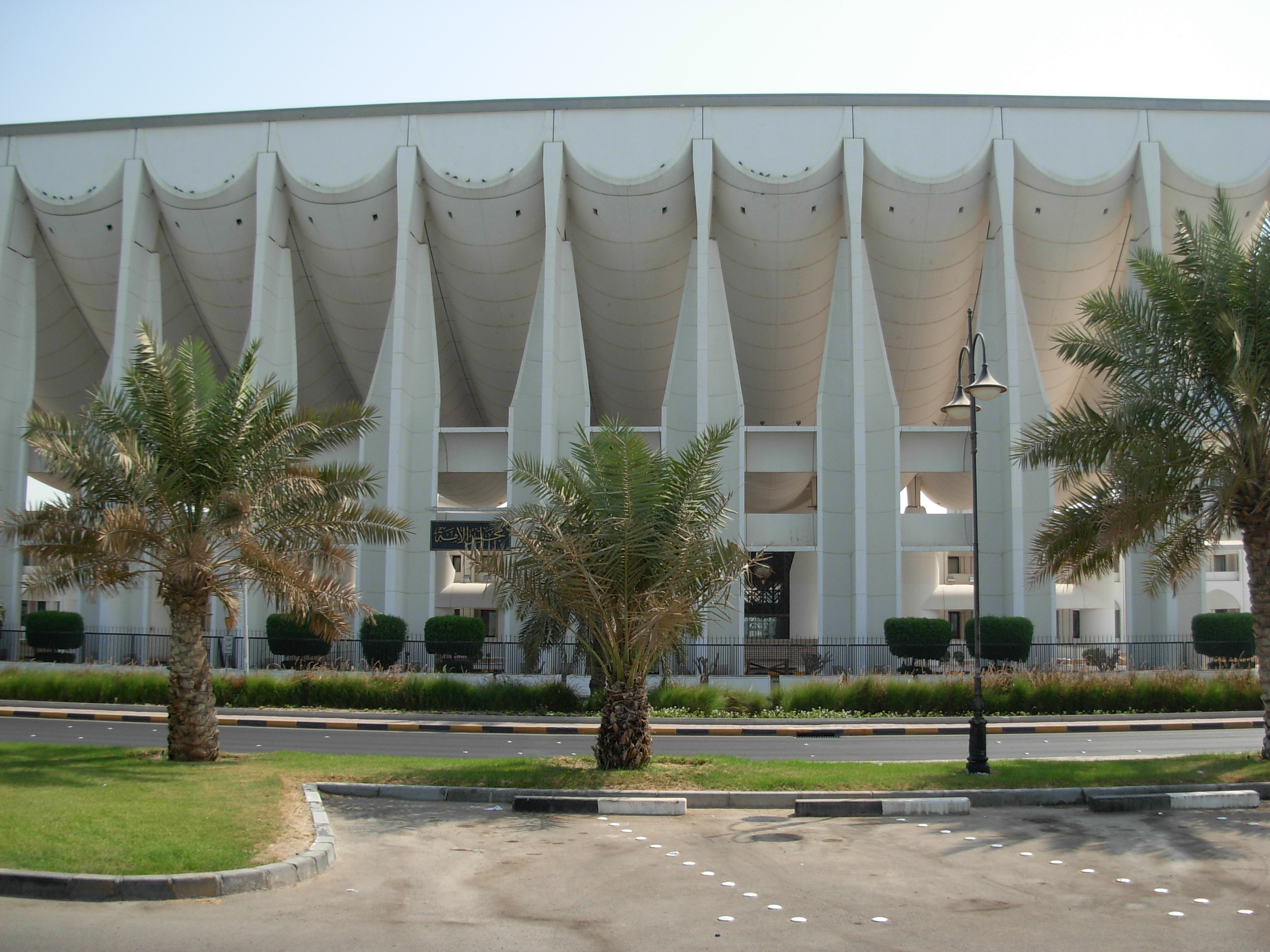
Close-up of main building

Covering an area of some 40 by 80 metres, the public square has an inclined roof which rises up towards the Persian Gulf. It is supported by two rows of columns with semi-cylindrical shells. Unlike traditional constructions, it consists of 11 inclined semi-cylinders, 7.5 metres wide, post-tensioned with steel cables. The columns display an innovative approach to the economical use of concrete, gaining strength, and visual attraction, from their creative shaping.

The huge shell-concrete canopies are in striking contrast with the modular courtyard structures covered by flat roofs. The first canopy inside the enclosure faces northeast while the second, rather more elongated, lies just outside it, facing northwest towards the sea. Both are supported by precast upwardly tapering concrete columns. A third continuously undulating canopy covers the east–west central hall leading from the main entrance to the open square facing the ocean. Here, politicians could address their people like tribal leaders standing in a tent. Utzon explained the positioning had even stronger natural connotations, commenting: "...The hall seems to be born by the meeting between the ocean and the building in the same natural way as the surf is born by the meeting of the ocean and the beach..."

With few exceptions, the building consists of prefabricated concrete elements. The semi-cylindrical column elements along the central hall were prefabricated in two halves, obliquely cut at the top. The reception hall and office block are also supported by a series of semi-cylindrical columns. Altogether there were some 70 types of element, including those for the mosque which was finally eliminated from the project.

== Fire damage ==
In August 1990, neighboring Iraq invaded Kuwait. Iraqi president Saddam Hussein made Kuwait the 19th province of Iraq (known as Kuwait Governorate). As a result, Ali Hassan al-Majid became the governor and took over what was left of the original government.

In February 1991, during the Gulf War, Iraqi troops set fire to the building when retreating in the face of the international alliance attacking Saddam Hussein. The building was rapidly restored at a cost of some $70 million. A number of changes to Utzon's design were imposed including an interruption in the central hall in order to provide for exhibition space, grey stone cladding was added to the columns and the covered square was compromised by curbs, guard houses and plants.

== Assessment ==
In his book on Utzon, Richard Weston considers that, despite the design and post-completion problems it has faced, "the Kuwait National Assembly Building remains one of the few architecturally compelling achievements by a Western architect in the Middle East... It remains a striking achievement, inviting comparison with the similarly fraught adventures of Le Corbusier and Louis Kahn in the Indian sub-continent."

== See also ==
- List of legislative buildings

== Literature ==
- Jørn Utzon, Kuwait National Assembly: Logbook Vol. IV, Copenhagen, Edition Bløndal, 2008, 312 pages. ISBN 87-91567-21-1
- Jørn Utzon, Additive Architecture: Logbook Vol. V, Copenhagen, Edition Bløndal, 2009, 312 pages. ISBN 87-91567-23-8
- Richard Weston: Utzon — Inspiration, Vision, Architecture. Denmark: Edition Bløndal, 2002. ISBN 87-88978-98-2
- Roberto Fabbri, Sara Saragoça, Ricardo Camacho, "Modern Architecture Kuwait, 1949-1989, Zurich, Niggli Verlag, 2016, 427 pages. ISBN 978-3-7212-0948-8
