= Jørn Utzon =

Danish architect (1918–2008)

- Utzon in 2000
- Born: Jørn Oberg Utzon; 9 April 1918; Copenhagen, Denmark
- Died: 29 November 2008 (aged 90); Helsingør, Denmark
- Education: Royal Danish Academy of Fine Arts
- Occupation: Architect
- Awards: Pritzker Prize
- Buildings: Sydney Opera House; Bagsværd Church; Kuwait National Assembly Building

Jørn Oberg Utzon (Danish: [ˈjɶɐ̯ˀn ˈut.sʌn]; 9 April 1918 – 29 November 2008) was a Danish architect. In 1957, he won an international design competition for his design of the Sydney Opera House in Australia. Utzon's revised design, which he completed in 1961, was the basis for the landmark, although it was not completed until 1973.

When the Sydney Opera House was declared a World Heritage Site on 28 June 2007, Utzon became only the second person to have received such recognition for one of his works during his lifetime, after Oscar Niemeyer. Other noteworthy works include Bagsværd Church near Copenhagen and the National Assembly Building in Kuwait. He also made important contributions to housing design, especially with his Kingo Houses near Helsingør.

Utzon attended the Royal Danish Academy of Fine Arts (1937–42) and was influenced early on by Gunnar Asplund and Alvar Aalto.

== Early life and career ==
Utzon was born in Copenhagen, the son of a naval architect, and grew up in Aalborg, Denmark, where he became interested in ships and a possible naval career. As a result of his family's interest in art, from 1937 he attended the Royal Danish Academy of Fine Arts where he studied under Kay Fisker and Steen Eiler Rasmussen. Following his graduation in 1942, he joined Gunnar Asplund in Stockholm where he worked together with Arne Jacobsen and Poul Henningsen. He took a particular interest in the works of American architect Frank Lloyd Wright. After the end of World War II and the German Occupation of Denmark, he returned to Copenhagen.

In 1946 he visited Alvar Aalto in Helsinki. In 1947–48 he travelled in Europe, in 1948 he went to Morocco where he was taken by the tall clay buildings. In 1949, he travelled to the United States and Mexico, where the pyramids provided further inspiration. Fascinated by the way the Mayans built towards the sky to get closer to God, he commented that his time in Mexico was "One of the greatest architectural experiences in my life."

In America, he visited Frank Lloyd Wright's home, Taliesin West, in the Arizona desert and met Charles and Ray Eames. In 1950 he established his own studio in Copenhagen and, in 1952, built an open-plan house for himself, the first of its kind in Denmark. In 1957, he travelled first to China (where he was particularly interested in the Chinese desire for harmony), Japan (where he learnt much about the interaction between interiors and exteriors) and India, before arriving in Australia in 1957 where he stayed until 1966. All this contributed to Utzon's understanding of factors which contribute to successful architectural design.

== Architectural approach ==
Utzon had a Nordic sense of concern for nature which, in his design, emphasized the synthesis of form, material and function for social values. His fascination with the architectural legacies of the ancient Mayas, the Islamic world, China, and Japan also informed his practice. This developed into what Utzon later referred to as Additive Architecture, comparing his approach to the growth patterns of nature. A design can grow like a tree, he explained: "If it grows naturally, the architecture will look after itself."

== Sydney Opera House ==
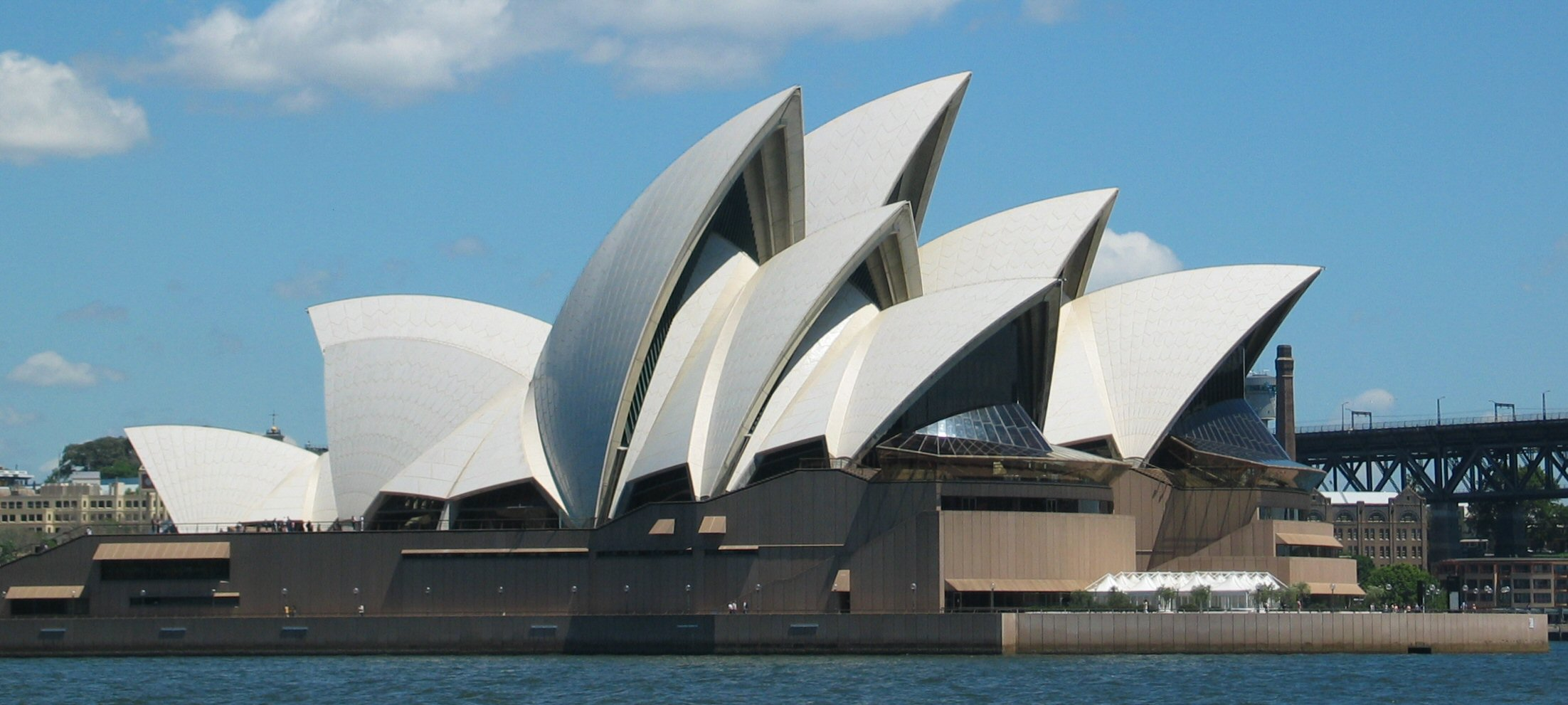
Sydney Opera House

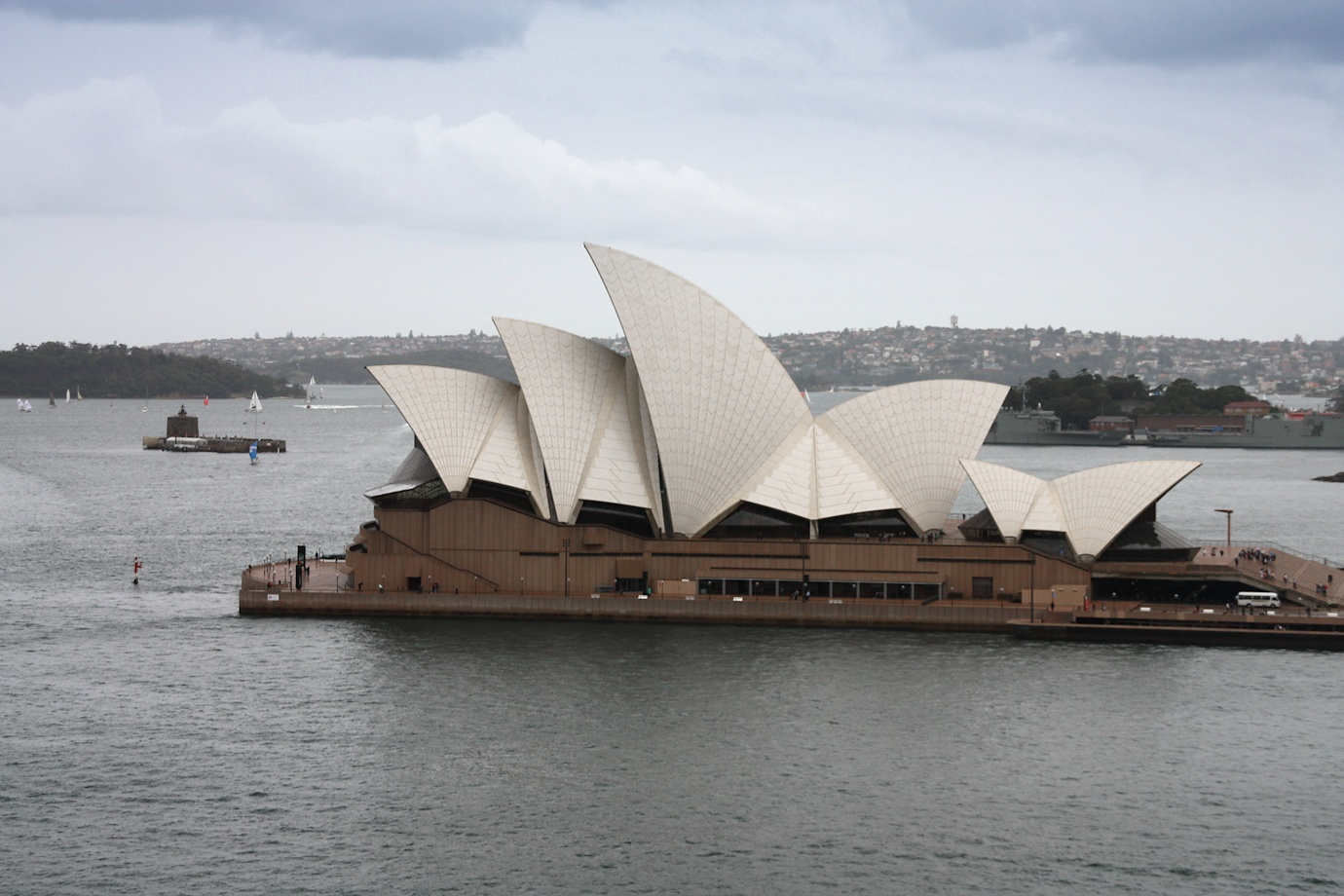
Sydney Opera House - side view

In 1957, Utzon unexpectedly won the competition to design the Sydney Opera House. His submission was one of 233 designs from 32 countries, many of them from the most famous architects of the time. Although he had won six other architectural competitions previously, the Opera House was his first non-domestic project. One of the judges, Eero Saarinen, described it as "genius" and declared he could not endorse any other choice.

The designs Utzon submitted were little more than preliminary drawings. Emory Kemp's consulting career began at Ove Arup, where, he conducted analytical calculations for the roof, noting this was no simple task, as Utzon's sketches were designed to embellish the beauty of the international landmark, not necessarily for simple mathematics. Concerned that delays would lead to lack of public support, the Cahill Government of New South Wales nonetheless gave the go-ahead for work to begin in 1958. The British engineering consultancy Ove Arup & Partners put out tenders without adequate working drawings and construction work began on 2 March 1959. As a result, the podium columns were not strong enough to support the roof and had to be rebuilt. The situation was complicated by Cahill's death in October 1959.

The extraordinary structure of the shells themselves represented a puzzle for the engineers. This was not resolved until 1961, when Utzon himself finally came up with the solution. He replaced the original elliptical shells with a design based on complex sections of a sphere. Utzon says his design was inspired by the simple act of peeling an orange: the 14 shells of the building, if combined, would form a perfect sphere.

Although Utzon had spectacular, innovative plans for the interior of these halls, he was unable to realise this part of his design. In mid-1965, the New South Wales Liberal government of Robert Askin was elected. Askin had been a 'vocal critic of the project prior to gaining office.' His new Minister for Public Works, Davis Hughes, was even less sympathetic. Elizabeth Farrelly, Australian architecture critic has written that

at an election night dinner party in Mosman, Hughes' daughter Sue Burgoyne boasted that her father would soon sack Utzon. Hughes had no interest in art, architecture or aesthetics. A fraud, as well as a philistine, he had been exposed before Parliament and dumped as Country Party leader for 19 years of falsely claiming a university degree. The Opera House gave Hughes a second chance. For him, as for Utzon, it was all about control; about the triumph of homegrown mediocrity over foreign genius.

Utzon soon found himself in conflict with the new Minister. Attempting to rein in the escalating cost of the project, Hughes began questioning Utzon's capability, his designs, schedules and cost estimates, refusing to pay running costs. In 1966, after a final request from Utzon that plywood manufacturer Ralph Symonds should be one of the suppliers for the roof structure was refused, he resigned from the job, closed his Sydney office and vowed never to return to Australia. When Utzon left, the shells were almost complete, and costs amounted to only $22.9 million. Following major changes to the original plans for the interiors, costs finally rose to $103 million.

The Opera House was finally completed in 1973 and Elizabeth II attended its opening. Utzon was invited to the opening ceremony by the Premier and while pleased by the invitation, he declined commenting "I cannot be a guest of the Government of New South Wales and at the same time criticize one of its ministers". He was, however, to be recognised later when he was asked to design updates to the interior of the opera house. The Utzon Room, overlooking Sydney Harbour, was officially dedicated in October 2004. In a statement at the time Utzon wrote: "The fact that I'm mentioned in such a marvellous way, it gives me the greatest pleasure and satisfaction. I don't think you can give me more joy as the architect. It supersedes any medal of any kind that I could get and have got." Furthermore, Frank Gehry, one of the Pritzker Prize judges, commented: "Utzon made a building well ahead of its time, far ahead of available technology, and he persevered through extraordinarily malicious publicity and negative criticism to build a building that changed the image of an entire country."

== Works in Denmark ==
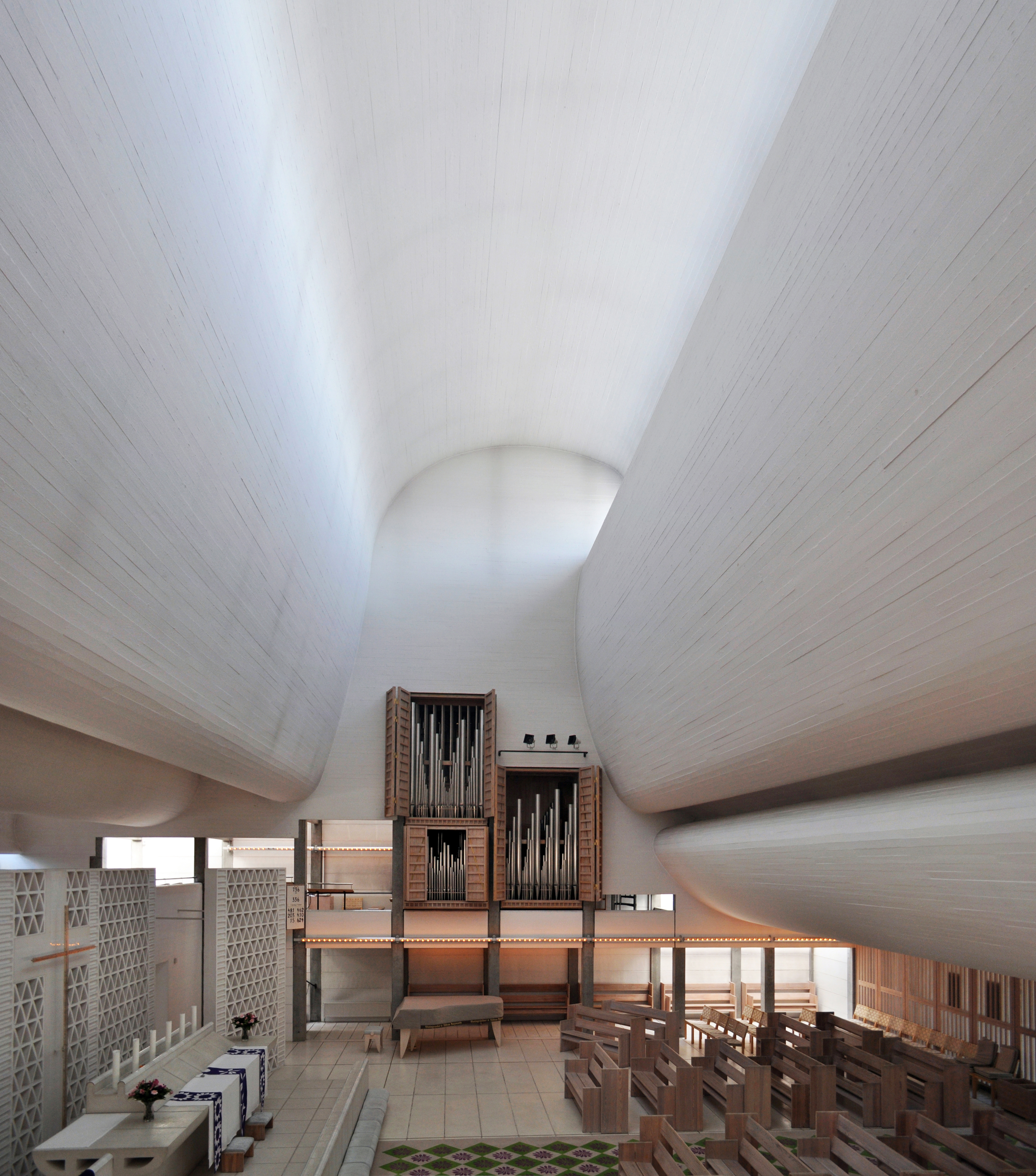
Bagsværd Church near Copenhagen (1968–1976)

While some of Utzon's most notable works are spread around the globe, he was most prolific in his native Denmark, whose landscape inspired him more than any other. Bagsværd Church, just north of Copenhagen, is considered to be a masterpiece of contemporary church architecture, thanks to its bright, naturally illuminated interior and its concrete ceiling straddled with softly-rounded vaulting inspired by clouds. Designed in 1968, the church was completed in 1976. In the church there is a grand piano by Steingraeber designed by Utzon. The Kingo Houses in Helsingør (1958) consist of 63 L-shaped homes based on the design of traditional Danish farmhouses with central courtyards. Built in rows following the undulations of the site, each of the houses not only has a view of its own but enjoys the best possible conditions for sunlight and shelter from the wind. Utzon described the arrangement as "flowers on the branch of a cherry tree, each turning towards the sun." In general, Utzon's houses display sophisticated and varied relationships to the path of the sun.

A few years later, he went on to design the Fredensborg Houses (1963) for Danish pensioners who had worked for long periods abroad. Utzon helped select the site, and planned a complex consisting of 47 courtyard homes and 30 terraced houses as well as a central building with a restaurant, meeting rooms and nine guest rooms. His design was inspired by housing in Beijing's Forbidden City. The homes are located around a square in groups of three, designed to maximize privacy, natural lighting, and views of the surrounding countryside. When he was awarded the Pritzker Prize in 2003, Utzon was specifically lauded for his working designing housing projects that, the jury said, were "designed with people in mind."

His Paustian Furniture Store (1988) on Copenhagen's waterfront stands on a multitude of columns inspired by a beech forest. A temple-like finish is achieved by 11 columns with fan-shaped capitals overlooking the harbour. Similar columns are also present inside the spacious interior, stretching up to the skylight dominating the roof.

In 2005, in close collaboration with his son Kim Utzon, he helped to plan the Utzon Center in Aalborg (completed 2008) designed to inspire young students of architecture. Located on the waterfront, its high sculptured roofs rise over an auditorium, a boathall and a library while the lower roofs of its exhibition rooms and workshops surround a central courtyard, sheltered from the wind.

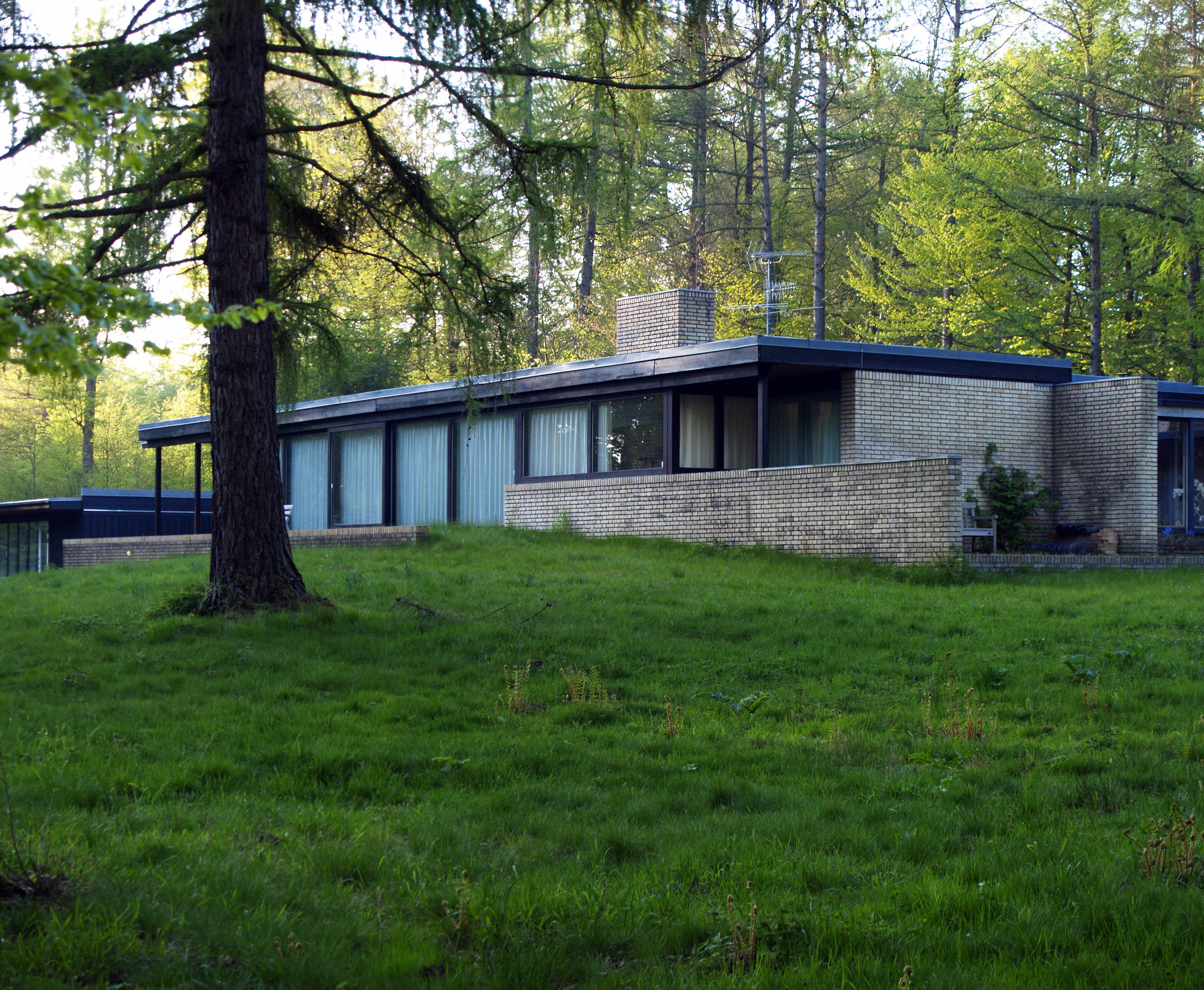
Architect's own house, Hellebæk, (1950–1952)

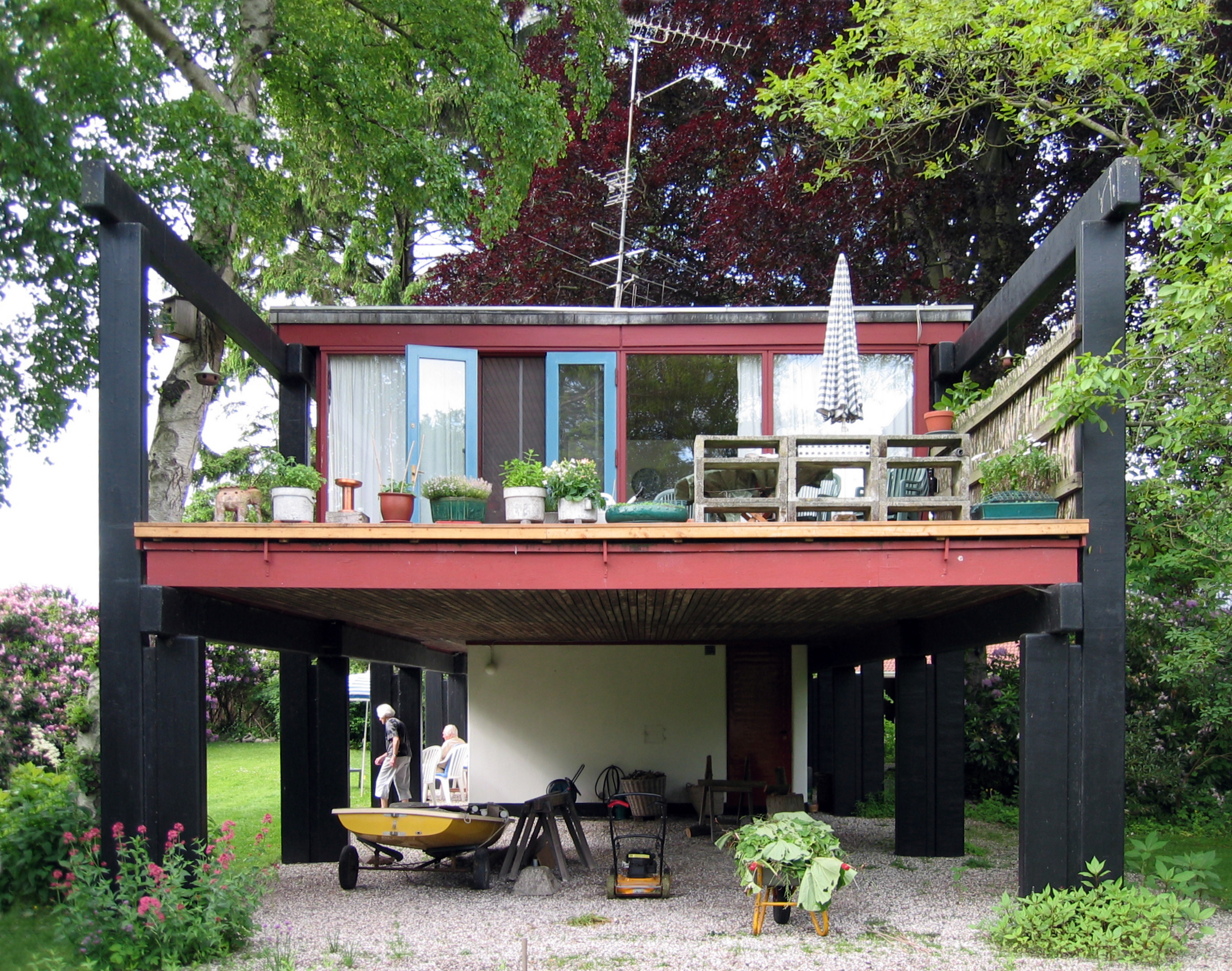
Middelboe house, Holte, (1953–1955)

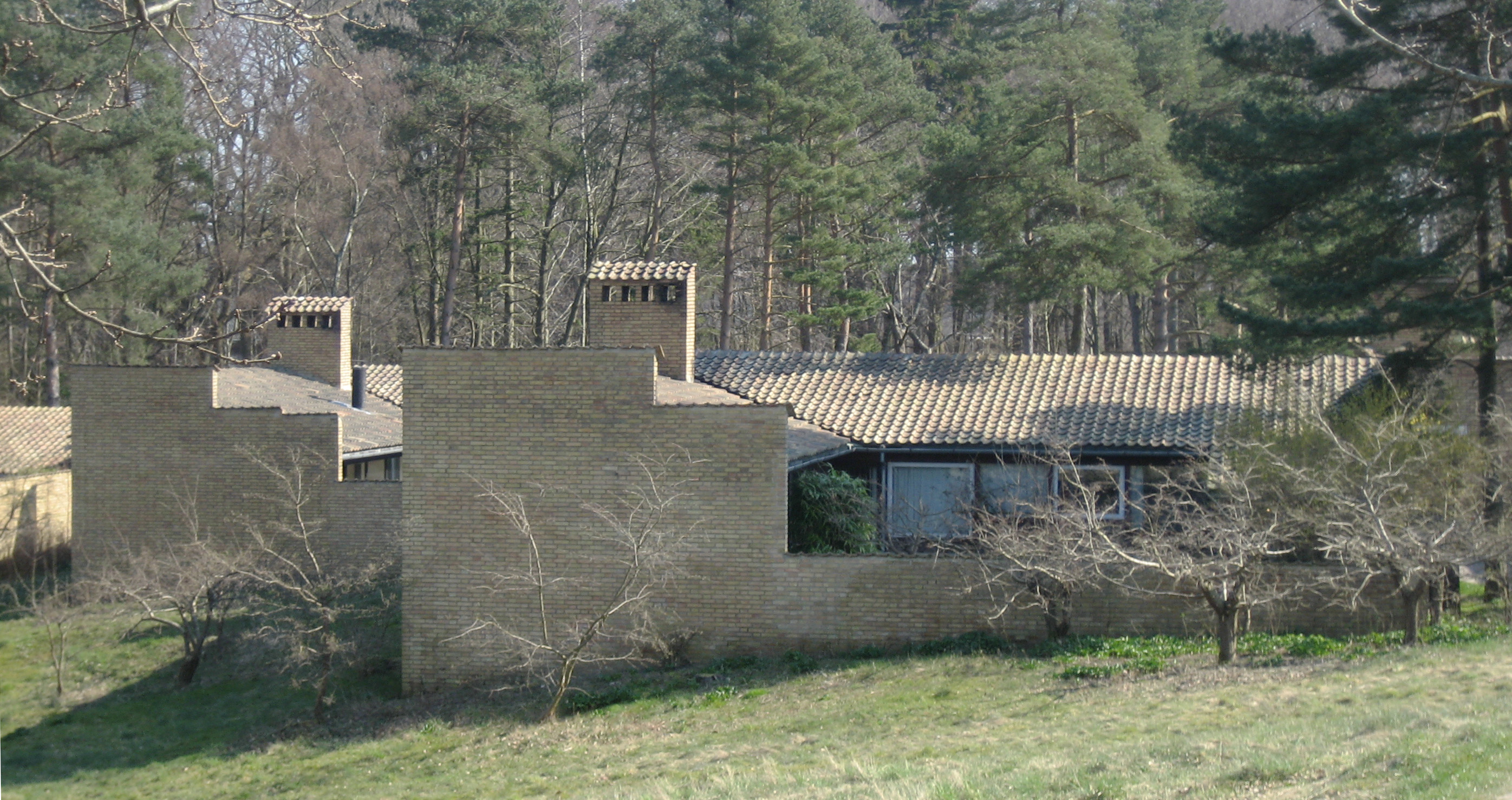
Kingo houses, Helsingør (1956–1960)

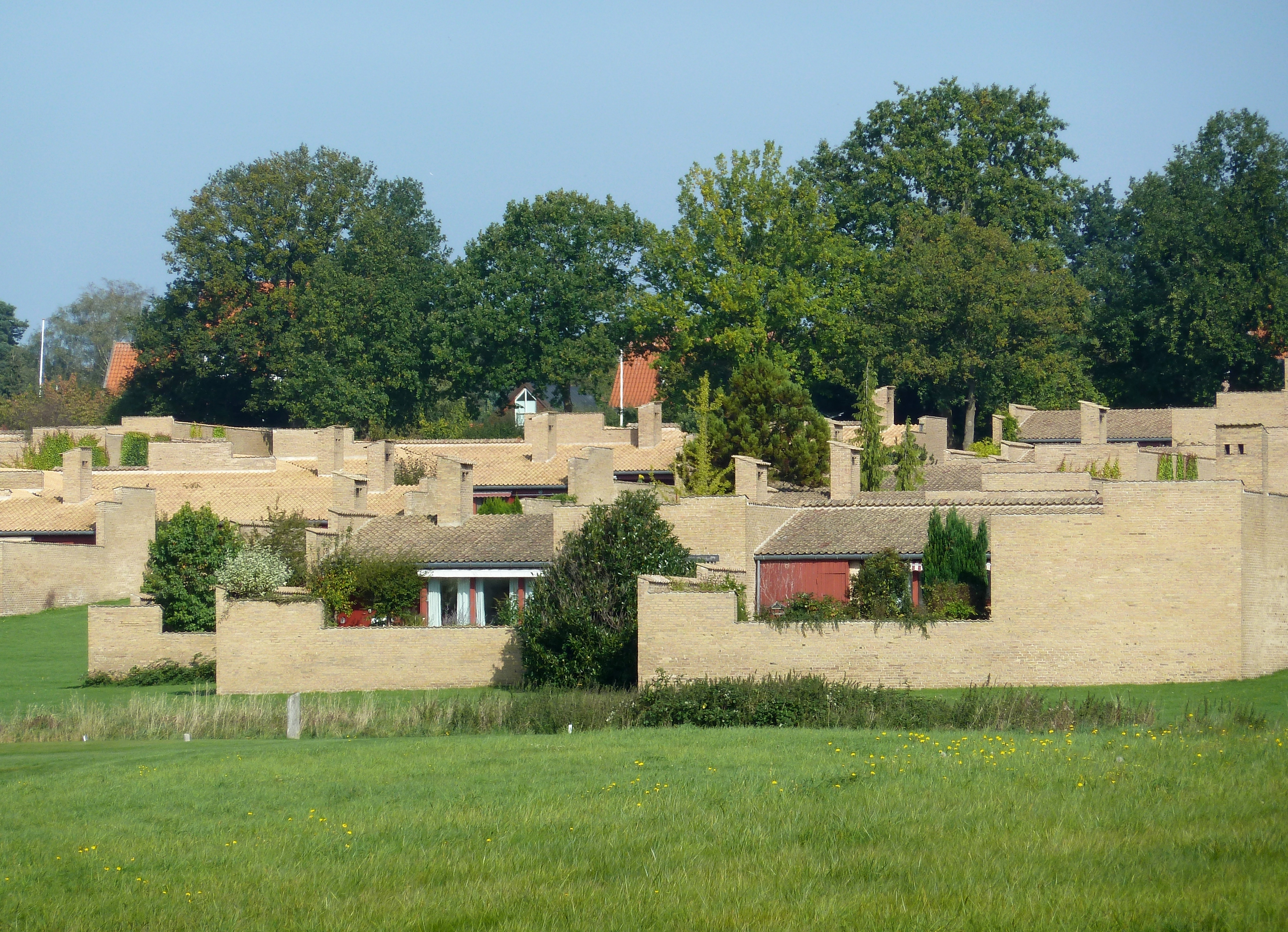
Fredensborg Houses (1959–1963)

== Other works ==
The National Assembly Building in Kuwait (1982)

Kuwait's National Assembly Building, completed in 1982, stands on the sea front with (in Utzon's words) "haze and white light and an untidy town behind." Benefiting from an understanding of Islamic architecture, Utzon designed a building consisting of a covered square, a parliamentary chamber, a conference hall, and a mosque. Its waving roof conveys the impression of moving fabric. Its columns are reminiscent of the Karnak temples. He was also referenced in a Durham University tour video by YouTuber Jack Edwards as being the designer for the university's Student's Union building.

The Melli Bank building in Tehran, slightly set back from the lines of the busy street where it stands, has a reinforced concrete frame faced with natural stone. The ground-level banking hall, naturally illuminated by skylight vaults, is connected to the upper floor by a central spiral staircase, providing maximum flexibility of space.

== Later life ==
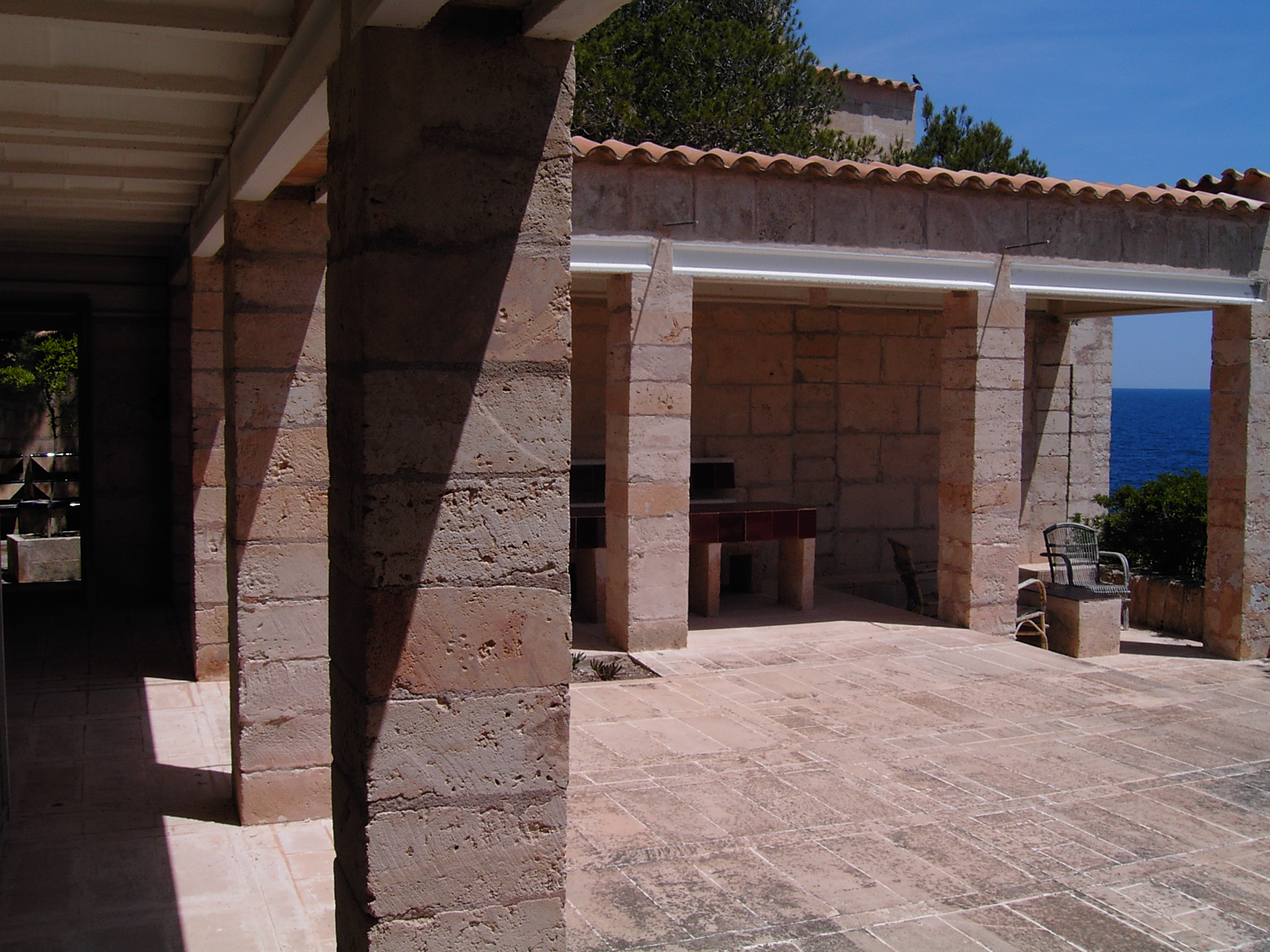
Can Lis, Utzon's first house on Mallorca

On his return from Australia in 1966, Utzon made a stop on Mallorca. Fascinated by the island, he decided to build a summer house there on the top of a cliff near the fishing village of Portopetro. Named Can Lis after his wife, the house was based on the home he had intended to build in Australia but was inspired by local materials and climate, setting standards for contemporary Mediterranean architecture. The house consists of five loosely linked blocks with a colonnaded outdoor area, a living room and two bedrooms, each with its own courtyard. The use of locally sourced pink stone in rough pillars is designed to give the impression of a much older building, in keeping with the landscape.

Although Utzon and his wife spent an increasing amount of time on Mallorca, they became disturbed by all the tourists who came to see their home. They decided to move to a more remote area in the mountains where they built a second house known as Can Feliz, consisting of three blocks for dining, living and sleeping, separated by courtyards. The upper part of the grand theatrical living space is furnished for working with heavy timber bookcases and a large table. A huge window provides magnificent views of the pine forests and the sea beyond.

The Utzon Center in Aalborg, designed together with his son Kim, was the architect's last assignment. In 2005 he commented, "From the bottom of my heart, I hope that the Utzon Center will be a place where positive thoughts converge and where students from the School of Architecture gather when they want to get together to discuss their ideas. It is intended to be a power centre for the architects and people of the future."

Utzon died in Copenhagen on 29 November 2008 of a heart attack in his sleep after a series of operations. He was 90 years old at the time of his death, and had never returned to Australia to see the completed opera house. On 2 December 2008 the Parliament of New South Wales passed a special motion of condolence to honour Utzon's life and work. He was survived by his wife, Lis, his sons Jan and Kim, his daughter Lin, and several grandchildren. His sons are trained architects and his daughter is a designer, muralist and artist who was at one time married to the Australian architect Alex Popov.

== Buildings and projects ==
Major built projects

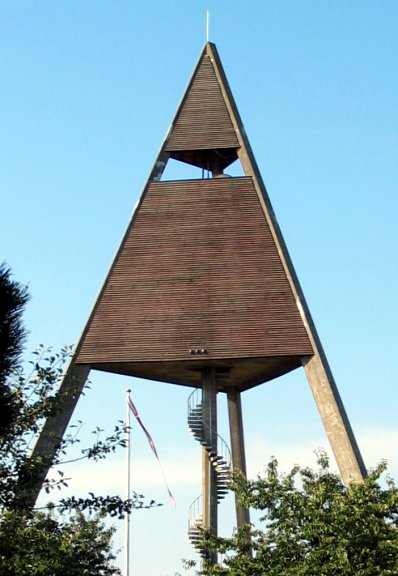
Svaneke water tower (1951)

- Water tower in Svaneke, Bornholm, Denmark, 1952
- Architect's own house, Hellebæk, Denmark, 1952
- House in Holte, Denmark, 1953
- Kingo Houses, Helsingør, Denmark 1956–59
- Elineberg Housing, Helsingborg, Sweden, 1966
- Planetstaden housing project in Lund, Sweden, 1957–58
- Sydney Opera House, Sydney, Australia, 1973
- Fredensborg Houses, courtyard housing in Fredensborg, Denmark, 1965
- Melli Bank, University of Tehran Branch, Tehran, Iran, 1962
- Hammershøj Care Centre, Helsingør, Denmark, 1966
- Espansiva building system, pre-fabricated single-family houses, Denmark, 1960s
- Bagsværd Church, Bagsværd, Denmark, 1976
- Can Lis, Architect's own house, Mallorca, Spain, 1971
- National Assembly of Kuwait, Kuwait City, Kuwait, 1982
- Paustian Furniture Store, Copenhagen, Denmark, 1987
- Can Feliz, Mallorca, Spain, 1994
- Skagen Odde Nature Centre, Skagen, Denmark, 1989 (completed by his son Jan Utzon in 1999–2000)
- Esbjerg Performing Arts Centre, Esbjerg, Denmark, 1997
- Utzon Center, Aalborg, 2008 (with Kim Utzon)
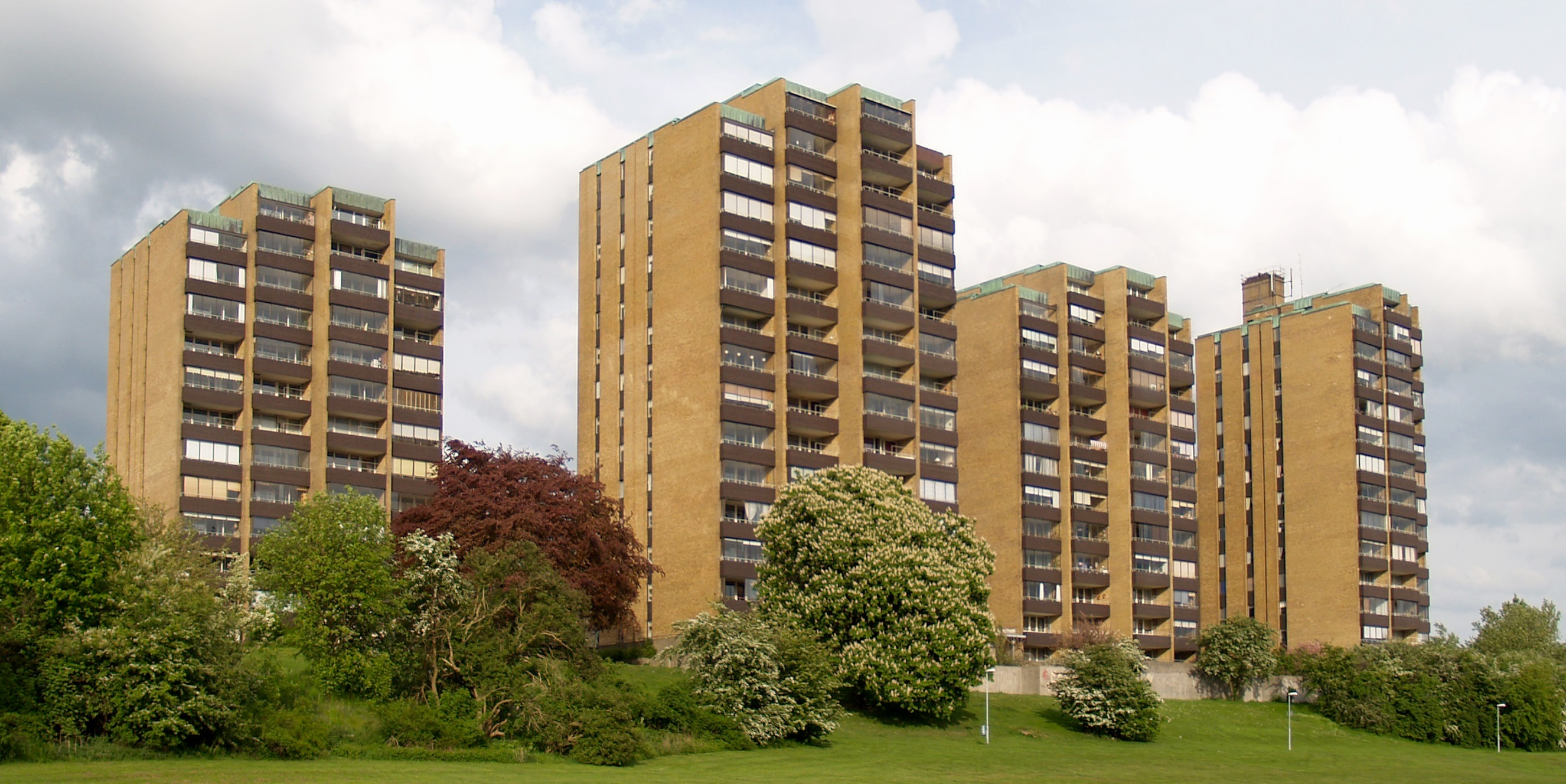
Elineberg Housing, Helsingborg, Sweden, (1954–1966)

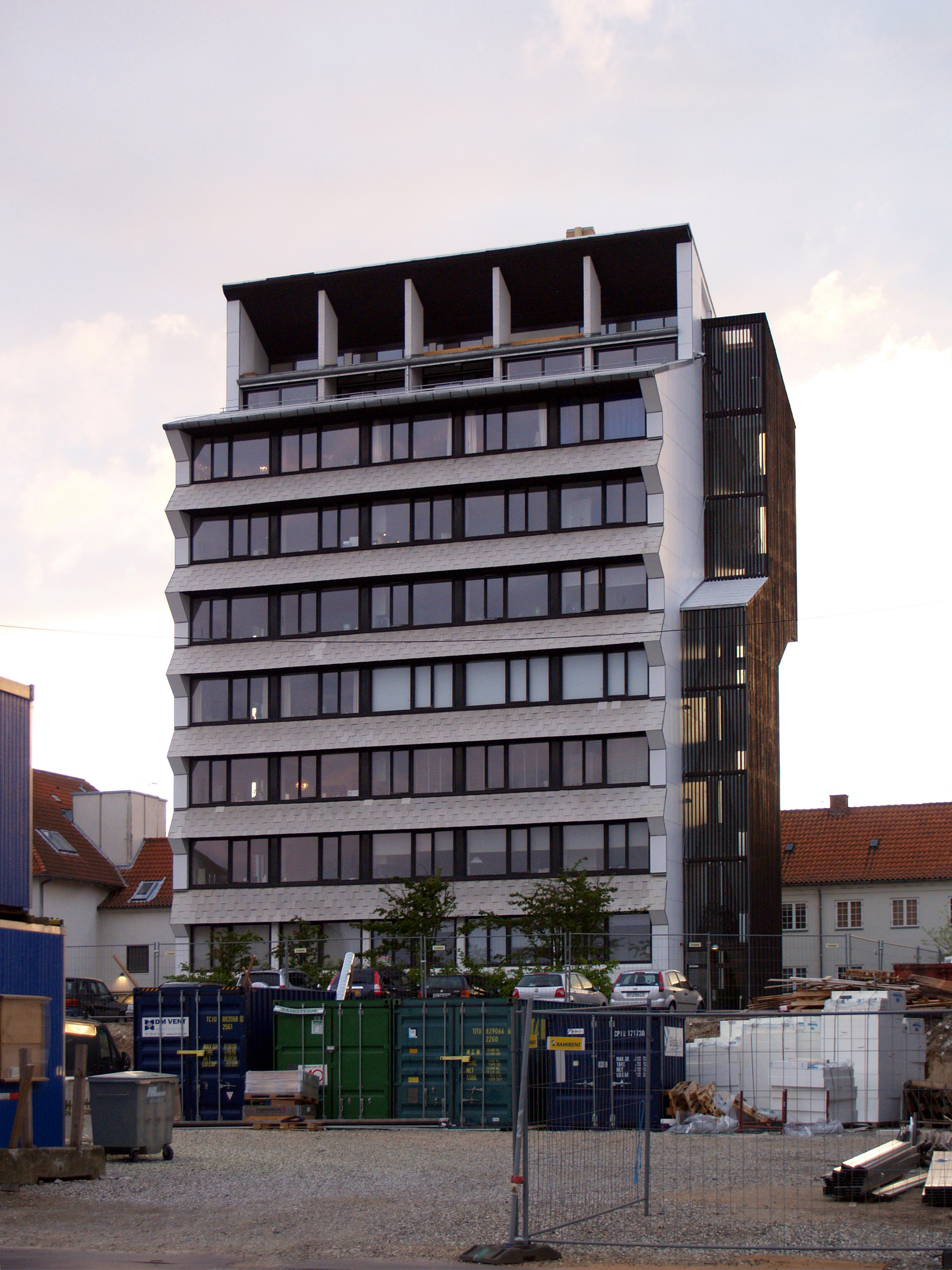
Hammershøj Care Centre, Helsingør, Denmark, (1962–1966)

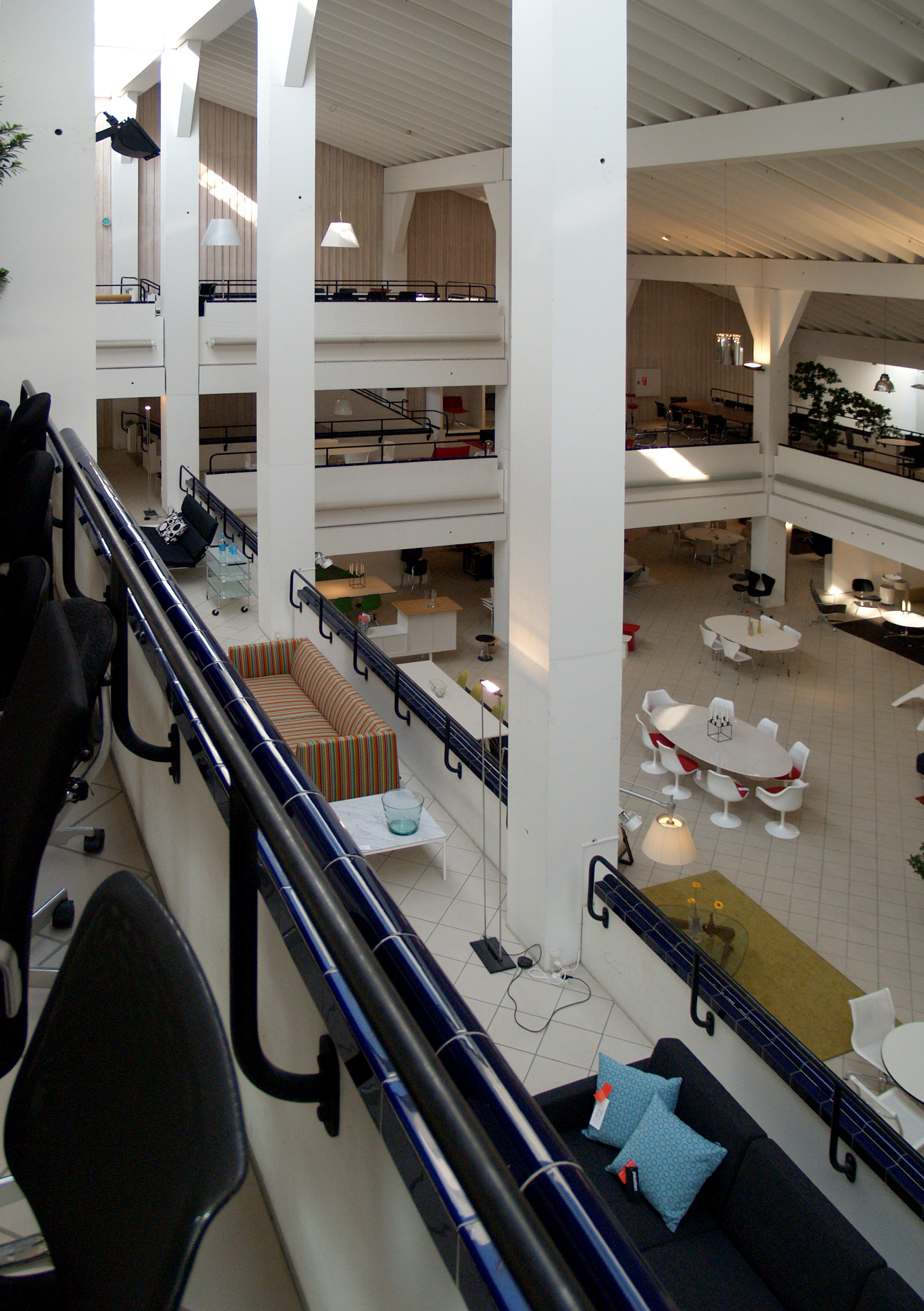
Paustian furniture store, Copenhagen (1987)

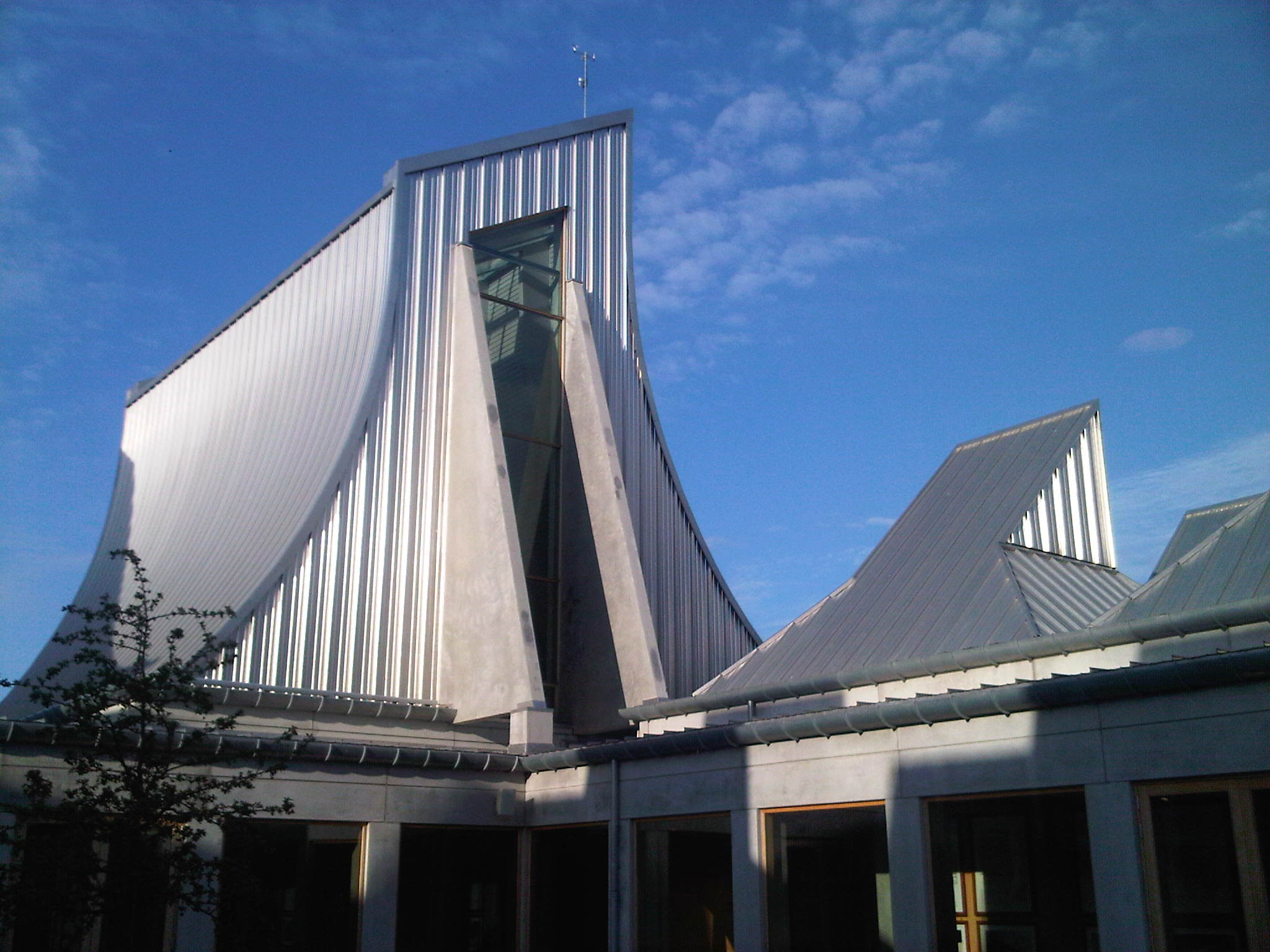
Utzon Center, Aalborg (2005–2008)

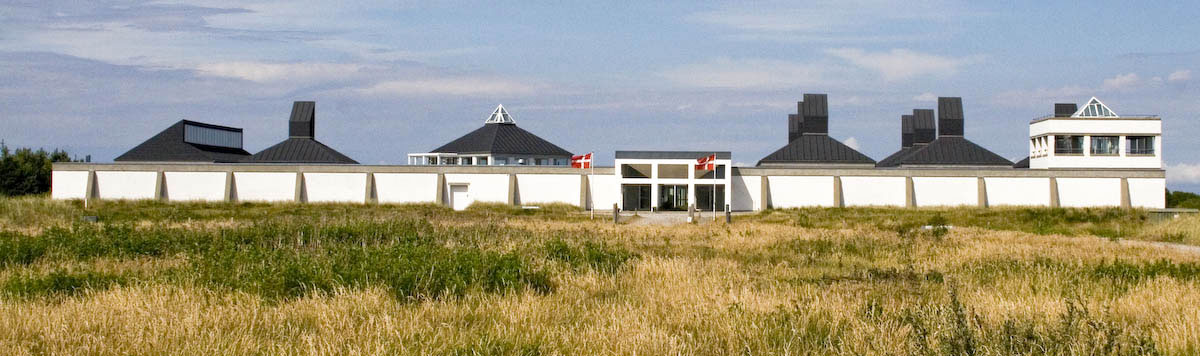
Skagen Odde Naturcenter, Denmark, 1989 (completed by his son Jan Utzon in 1999–2000)

== Written works ==
Books

- Jørn Utzon, The Courtyard Houses: Logbook Vol. I, Copenhagen, Edition Bløndal, 2004, 180 pages. ISBN 87-91567-01-7
- Jørn Utzon, Bagsværd Church: Logbook Vol. II, Copenhagen, Edition Bløndal, 2005, 168 pages. ISBN 87-91567-07-6
- Jørn Utzon, Two Houses on Majorca: Logbook Vol. III, Copenhagen, Edition Bløndal, 2004, 76 pages. ISBN 87-91567-03-3
- Jørn Utzon, Kuwait National Assembly: Logbook Vol. IV, Copenhagen, Edition Bløndal, 2008, 312 pages. ISBN 87-91567-21-1
- Jørn Utzon, Additive Architecture: Logbook Vol. V, Copenhagen, Edition Bløndal, 2009, 312 pages. ISBN 87-91567-23-8
- Jørn Utzon and Philip Drew, Sydney Opera House, London, Phaidon Press, 1995, 60 pages. ISBN 0-7148-3297-9
- Martin Keiding and Kim Dirckinck-Holmfeld (ed.), Utzon and the new tradition, Utzon Library, Copenhagen, Danish Architectural Press, 2005, 262 pages. ISBN 87-7407-313-3
- Martin Keiding and Kim Dirckinck-Holmfeld (ed.), Utzon's own houses, Utzon Library, Copenhagen, Danish Architectural Press, 2004. ISBN 87-7407-316-8

Journal articles

- Jørn Utzon and Tobias Faber, Tendenser i nutidens arkitektur, Arkitektur, Copenhagen, 1947 (in Danish)
- Jørn Utzon, Additiv arkitektur, Arkitektur, Copenhagen 1970, No. 1 (in Danish)
- Jørn Utzon, Platforms and Plateaus: Ideas of a Danish Architect, Zodiac 10, Milan 1962
- Jørn Utzon and others, A survey of Utzon's work, some descriptions by Utzon, and the Sydney Opera House as finally contemplated, Zodiac 5, Milan 1959
- Jørn Utzon and others, Utzon's descriptions of the Sydney Opera House, the Silkeborg Museum and the Zurich Theatre. Also Giedion's Jørn Utzon and the Third Generation, Zodiac 14, Milan 1965

== Awards and recognition ==
Utzon was bestowed an Honorary Fellowship of the American Institute of Architects (Hon. FAIA) in 1970 for his distinguished achievements as a foreign architect. On 17 May 1985, he was made an Honorary Companion of the Order of Australia (AC). He was given the Keys to the City of Sydney in 1998. He was involved in redesigning the Opera House, and in particular, the Reception Hall, beginning in 1999. In 2003, he received in his absence an honorary Doctor of Science degree in architecture (Hon. DScArch) from the University of Sydney; his son accepted the award on his behalf. In 2003, he was awarded the Pritzker Prize, architecture's highest honor.

In March 2006, Queen Elizabeth II opened the western colonnade addition to the building designed by Utzon who had not returned to Australia since 1966. His son, Jan, took his place at the opening ceremony instead, saying his father was "too old by now to take the long flight to Australia. But he lives and breathes the Opera House, and as its creator he just has to close his eyes to see it."

On 28 June 2007, the Sydney Opera House was declared a World Heritage Site.

In 2007 the Australian Institute of Architects named their annual international award the Jørn Utzon Award for International Architecture.

Following Utzon's death in 2008, on 25 March 2009, a state memorial and reconciliation concert was held in the Concert Hall at Sydney Opera House.

List of awards

- 1967 C. F. Hansen Medal
- 1973 RAIA Gold Medal from the Royal Australian Institute of Architects
- 1978 RIBA Royal Gold Medal
- 1980 The Daylight and Building Component Award
- 1982 Alvar Aalto Medal
- 1987 Nykredit Architecture Prize
- 1992 Wolf Prize
- 1998 Sonning Prize
- 2000 Golden Lion for Lifetime Achievement
- 2003 Pritzker Prize

== Influence ==
According to Kenneth Frampton, Utzon's architectural influence is manifest on three levels: the emphasis given to the roof element, the importance given to the grounding of the building, and the commitment to "the cultural validity of organic growth". Kim Dirkinck-Holmfeld, writing in Dansk Arkitektur: 1960–1995, comments: Utzon did not obtain many commissions in his mother country but his importance was considerable in terms of direct imitation or inspiration. And he was the only Danish architect who made a significant contribution to the global development of Modernism.

== See also ==
- Architecture of Denmark
