= Utzon =

Utzon is a Danish surname that may refer to the following notable people:

- Einar Utzon-Frank (1888–1955), Danish sculptor
- Jan Utzon (born 1944), Danish architect, son of Jørn
- Jørn Utzon (1918–2008), Danish architect
  - Utzon Center in Aalborg, Denmark
  - Utzon's House in Hellebæk
- Kim Utzon (born 1957), Danish architect, son of Jørn
- Lin Utzon (born 1946), Danish designer, daughter of Jørn
