= 1987 in architecture =

The year 1987 in architecture involved some significant architectural events and new buildings.

== Events ==
- August 13 – The first building in England of post-war design to be Listed is Bracken House in the City of London, designed by Sir Albert Richardson as the Financial Times headquarters (1955–59).
- Construction of Ryugyong Hotel in Pyongyang, North Korea, designed by Baikdoosan Architects & Engineers, begins; it will not be completed for 30 years.

== Buildings and structures ==
=== Buildings opened ===
- February – The CenTrust Tower in Miami.
- June – The Menil Collection, in Houston, Texas, United States, designed by Renzo Piano.
- August – National Library of New Zealand in Wellington.
- August 17 – One Liberty Place in Philadelphia, United States (Phase 1): the first tenant moves in.

=== Buildings completed ===
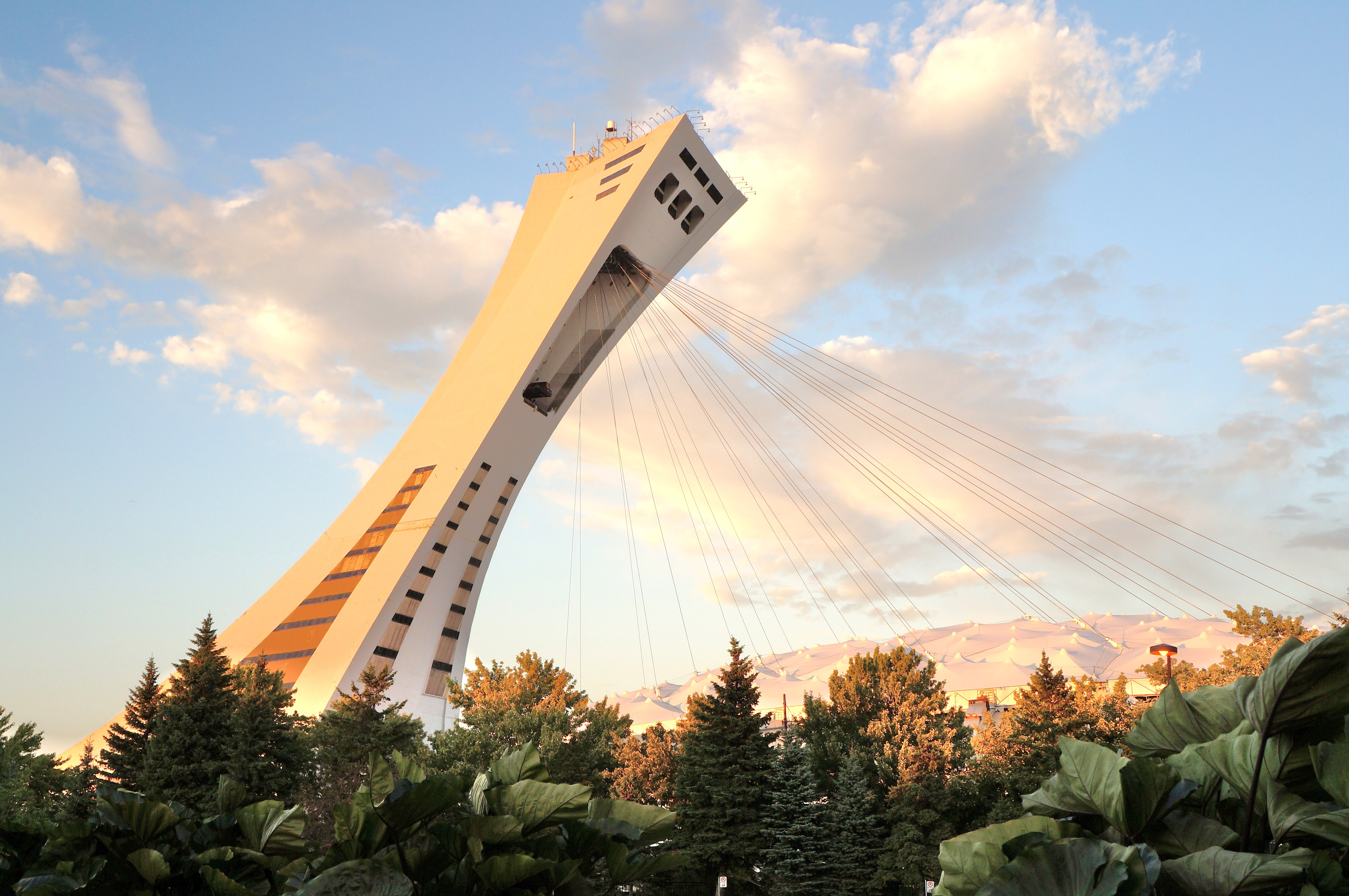
The tower at Stade Olympique et La Tour de Montréal in Montreal, Canada

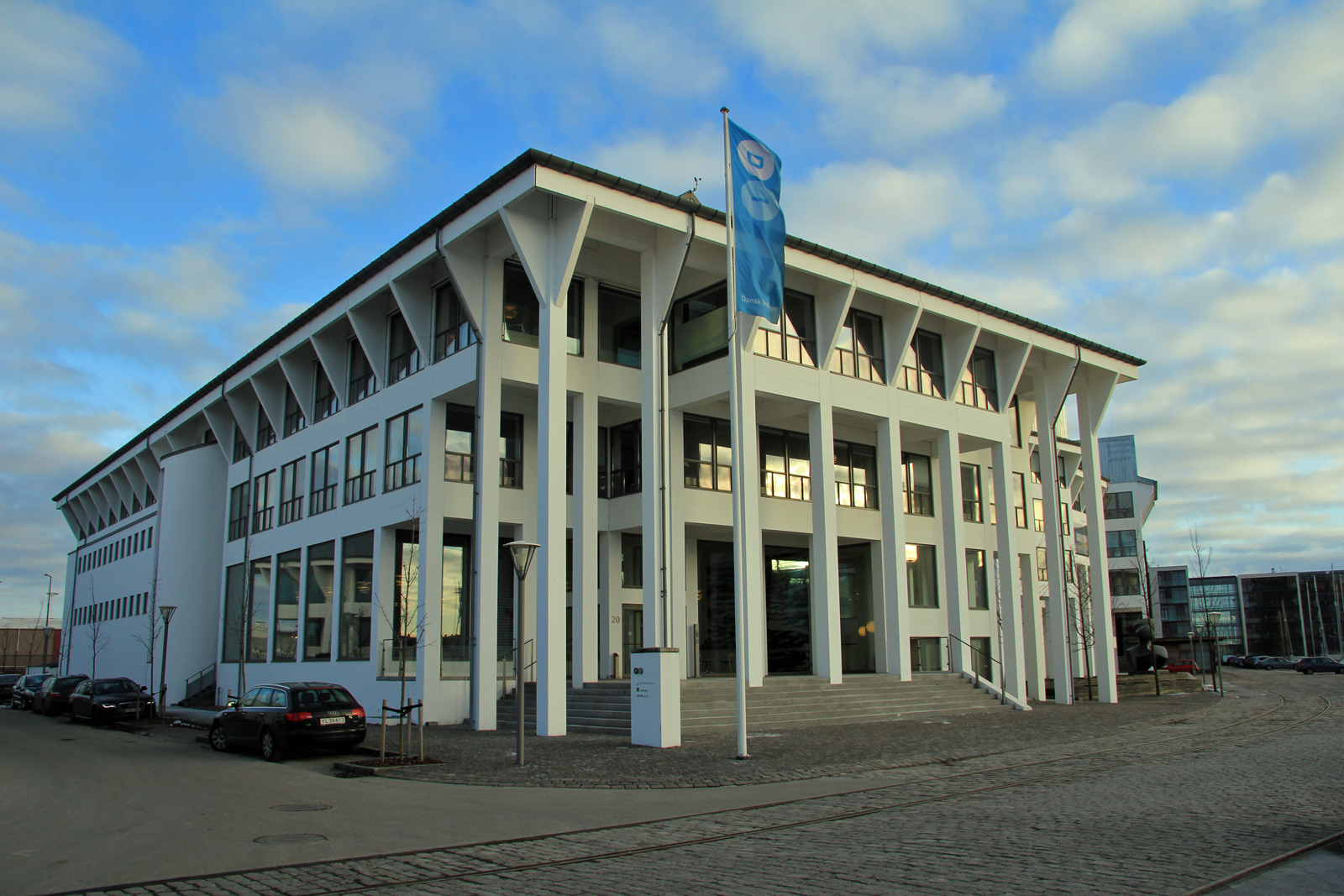
Paustian House, Copenhagen

- The Riga Radio and TV Tower in Riga, Latvia.
- One Atlantic Center in Atlanta, Georgia, US.
- The Shaanxi Provincial TV Tower in Xi'an, China.
- Comerica Bank Tower in Dallas, Texas, US.
- Metropolitan Tower in Manhattan, New York City, US.
- The JPMorgan Chase Tower in Dallas, Texas, US.
- 1000 Second Avenue in Seattle, Washington, US, designed by Donald Winkelmann of NBBJ.
- KPMG Tower in Montreal, Canada
- The tower at Stade Olympique et La Tour de Montréal in Montreal, Quebec, Canada is completed, 11 years after the Olympics took place, after a number of strikes by workers.
- King Saud Mosque, Jeddah, Saudi Arabia.
- Justice Palace in Riyadh, Saudi Arabia, designed by Rasem Badran.
- The original 7 World Trade Center in Lower Manhattan, New York as the final building in the original World Trade Center complex.
- The Clore Gallery at Tate Britain in London, designed by James Stirling.
- Richmond Riverside, London, designed by Quinlan Terry.
- The Mound Stand at Lord's Cricket Ground in London, designed by Michael Hopkins & Partners.
- Paustian House, a furniture showroom in Copenhagen designed by Jørn Utzon.
- The Pan Pacific Singapore.
- "House on chicken legs" residential apartment building in Saint Petersburg.
- 50 Glebe Place in Chelsea, London.
- Southern Outfall Pumping Station, Cleethorpes, England, designed by Sam Scorer.

== Awards ==
- Aga Khan Prize – Jean Nouvel for the Institute of the Arab World in Paris.
- Architecture Firm Award – Benjamin Thompson & Associates, Inc.
- Grand prix national de l'architecture – Jean Nouvel.
- Pritzker Prize – Kenzo Tange.
- Prix de l'Équerre d'Argent – Jean Nouvel and Architecture Studio for the Institute of the Arab World in Paris.
- RAIA Gold Medal – Daryl Jackson.
- RIBA Royal Gold Medal – Ralph Erskine.
- Twenty-five Year Award – Bavinger House.
- UIA Gold Medal – Reima Pietila.

== Deaths ==
- March 16 – Johan Otto von Spreckelsen, Danish architect (born 1929)
- April 22 – Erika Nõva, Estonian architect (born 1905)
- November 15 – Ernő Goldfinger, Hungarian-born architect and furniture designer (born 1902)
