= Hellebæk =

- Town
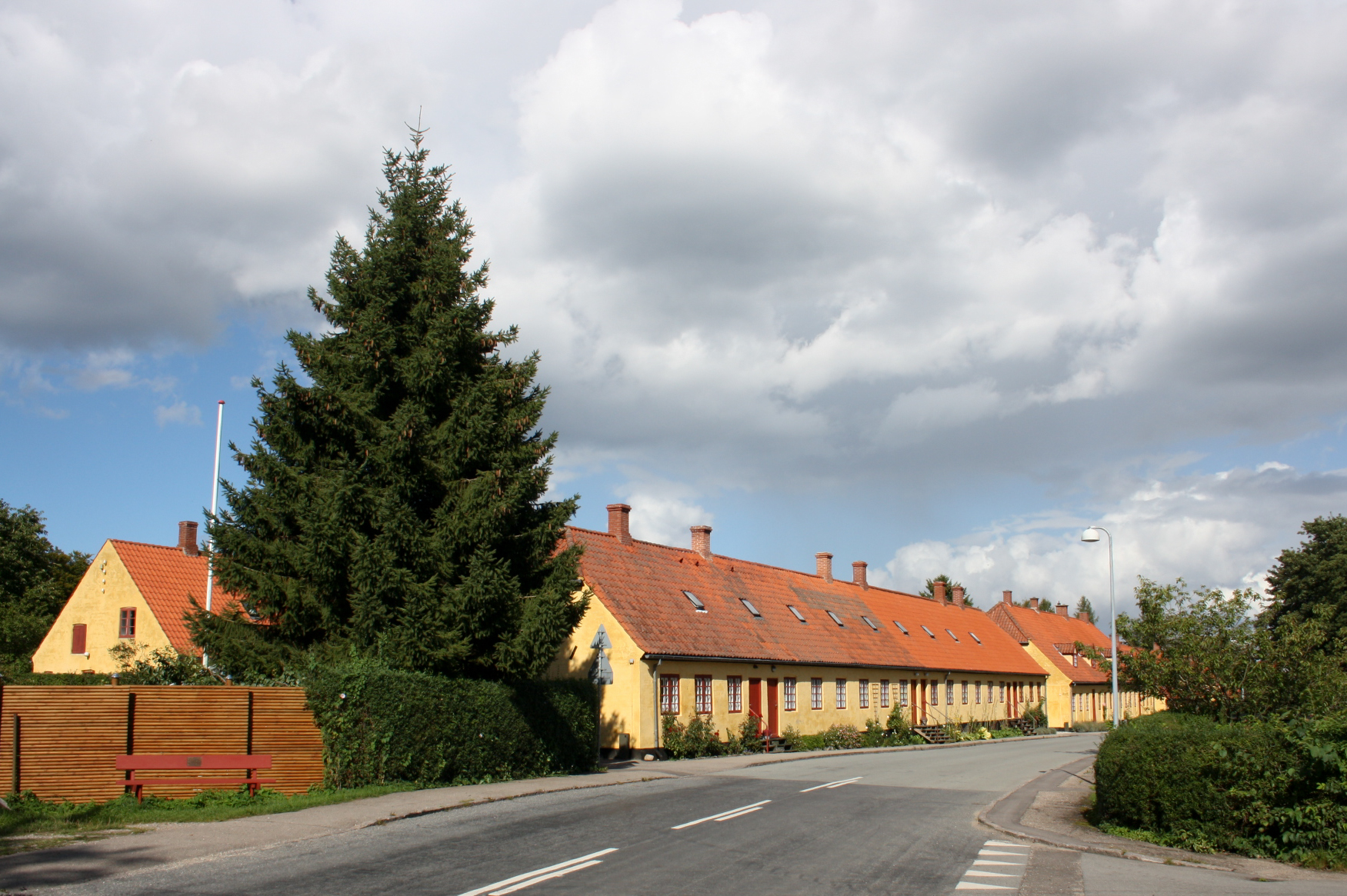
- House on Bøssemagergade (Gunmaker street) in Hellebæk

- Location in Denmark Hellebæk (Capital Region)
- Coordinates: 56°04′10″N 12°33′20″E
- Country: Denmark
- Region: Capital (Hovedstaden)
- Municipality: Helsingør

Area
  - Urban: 2.7 km^{2} (1.0 sq mi)

Population (2026-01-01)
  - Urban: 5,765
  - Urban density: 2,100/km^{2} (5,500/sq mi)
  - Gender: 2,814 males and 2,951 females
- Time zone: UTC+1 (CET)
  - Summer (DST): UTC+2 (CEST)
- Postal code: DK-3150 Hellebæk

Hellebæk is a town located on the coast five kilometres northwest of Helsingør, North Zealand, some 40 kilometres north of Copenhagen, Denmark. It has merged with the neighbouring community of Ålsgårde to form an urban area with a population of 5,765 (1 January 2026).

== Geography ==
Hellebæk occupies a narrow strip between the Kattegat and forest Teglstrup Hegn. The hinterland consists of hilly terrain that was formed by the Øresund Glacier during the last Ice Age some 10,000 years BC. The landscape is characterized by a number of southeast-to-northwest oriented, parallel streams and many small lakes, bogs and marshy depressions.

The two state forests Teglstrup Hegn and Hellebæk Skov have both been designated as Natura 200 sites. In 1974, n 806 ha area of the Hellebækgård estate was protected by the Danish conservation authorities.

== History ==
The name Hellebæk is first recorded as Hellebeck in 1554. The name means "Holy Stream" and refers to the local streams that runs through the town. Frederick II constructed a watermill named Kongens Mølle ("The King's Mill") at the mouth of the stream in 1576. It produced flour for the many soldiers, craftsmen and builders that worked on the expansion of Kronborg Castle which was completed in 1586. A second watermill was built after a few years and a total of seven mills were ultimately powered by the local watercourses.

Christian IV established an ironwork at the site in 1597-1600 and from 1603 also a copperwork. The ironworks was chiefly used for the manufacture of canons.

The weapons factory closed in 1870. The buildings were then used by Hellebæk Textile Factory which existed until 1977.

== Landmarks ==
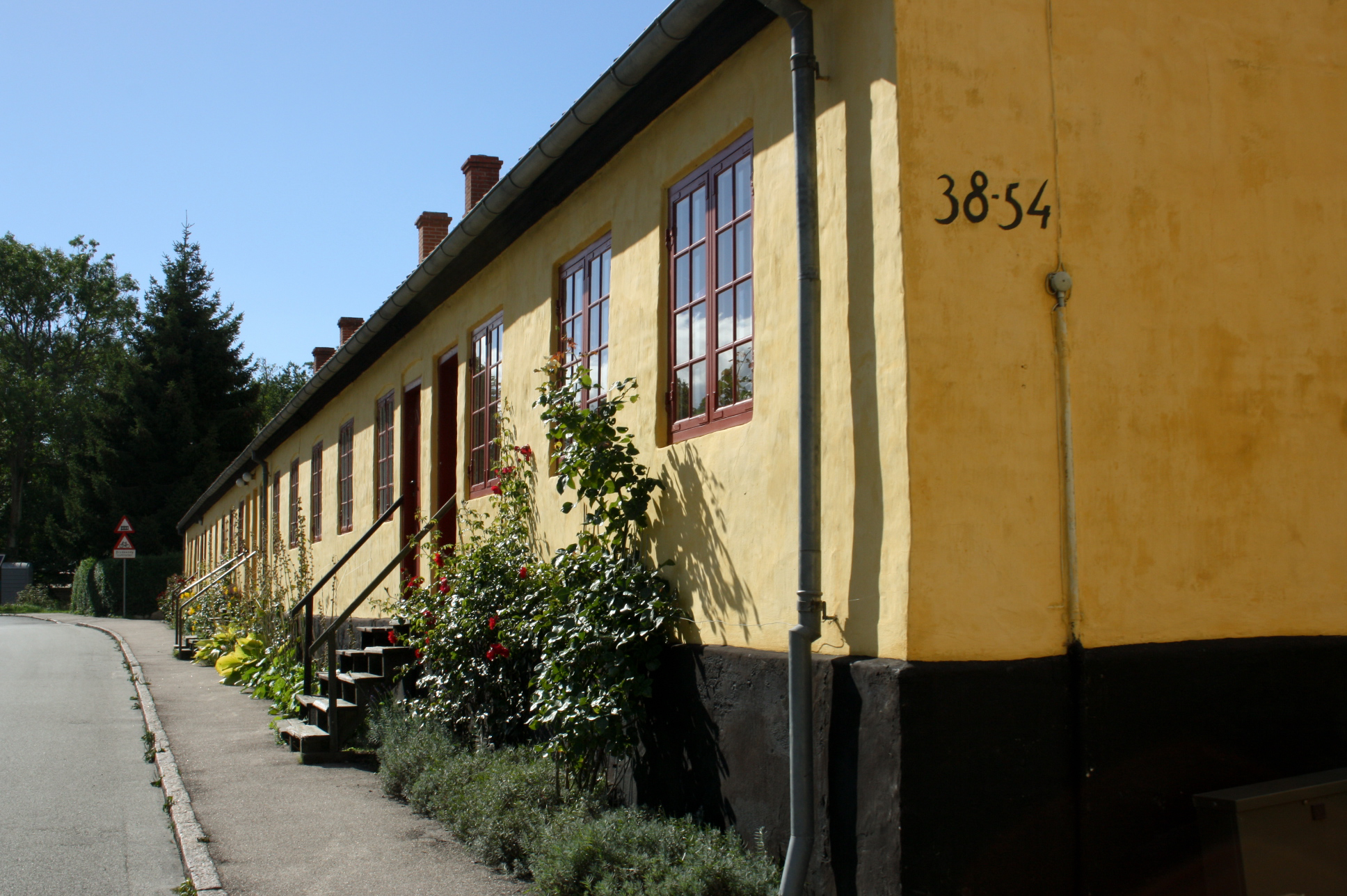
Bøssemagergade 38-54

Many of the buildings that line the street Bøssemagergade date from the industrial era. The house rows at No. 3-13 and nr.12-18 date from the 1740s and were used both as workshops and housing. They were rebuilt in brick in 1849 and later converted into residences for the workers at Hellebæk Textile Factory. Proberhuset (Bøssemagergade 19) is from 1856.

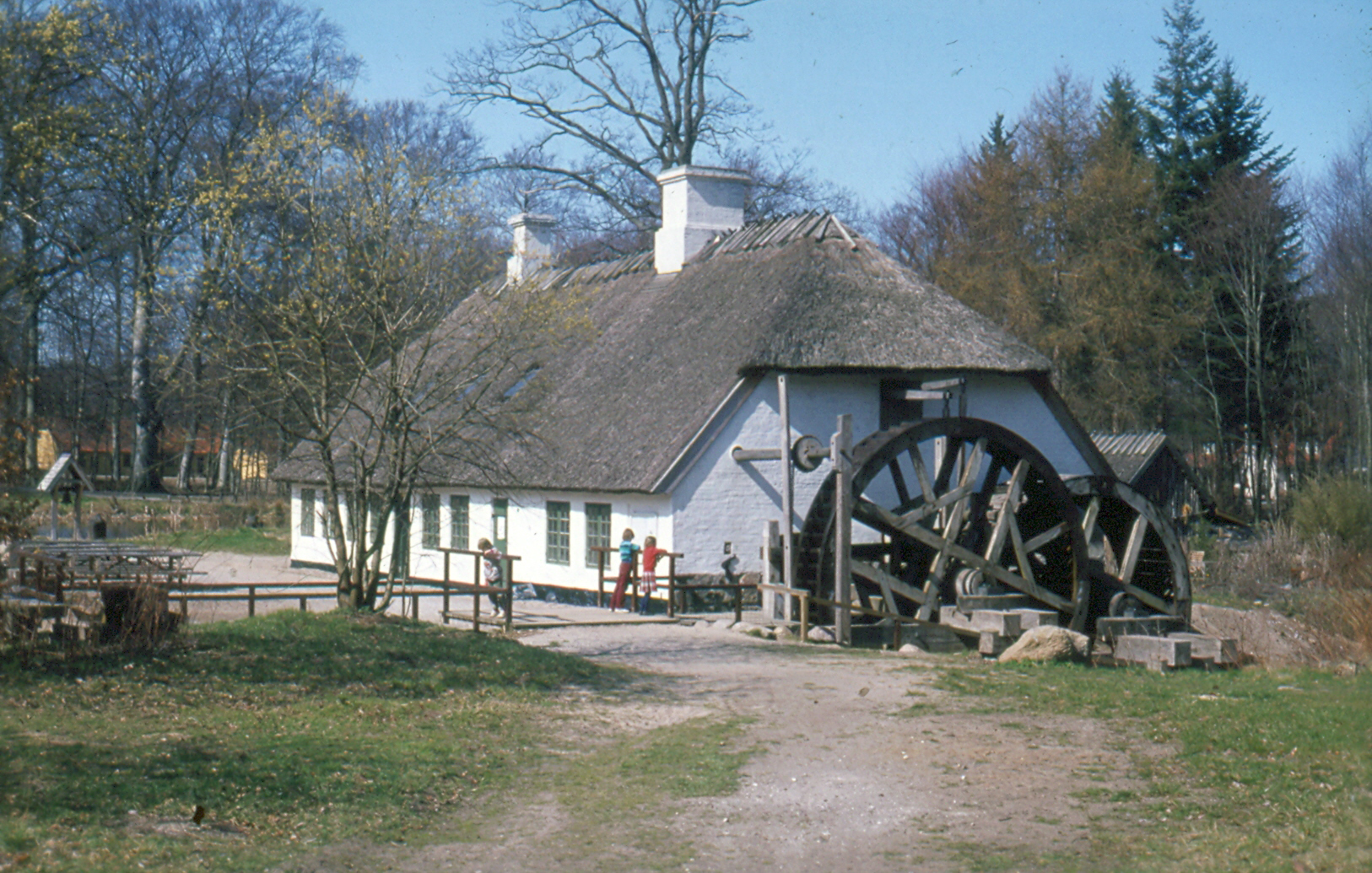
Hellebæk Hammermølle

Hellebæk Hammermølle is the only surviving of Kronborg Gun Factory's seven watermills. It was established in 1600 but the current building is from 1756. It was restored in 1982 and is now operated as a restaurant by Hellebæk-Ålsgårde Local Historic Society.

Hellebækgård (Nordre Strandvej 129) was originally a tenant farm first mentioned in 1576 when it was called Teglstrup but it was later used by Christian IV and by the managing board of Hellebæk Ironworks. it was acquired by the manager of the weapons factory and became known as Hellebækgård in 1728. The current main building was built in 1747 for Stephen Hansen by Philip de Lange in 1747. The building housed the Royal Danish Orphanage from 1952 until 2004. It now houses the Skorpeskolen private primary school.

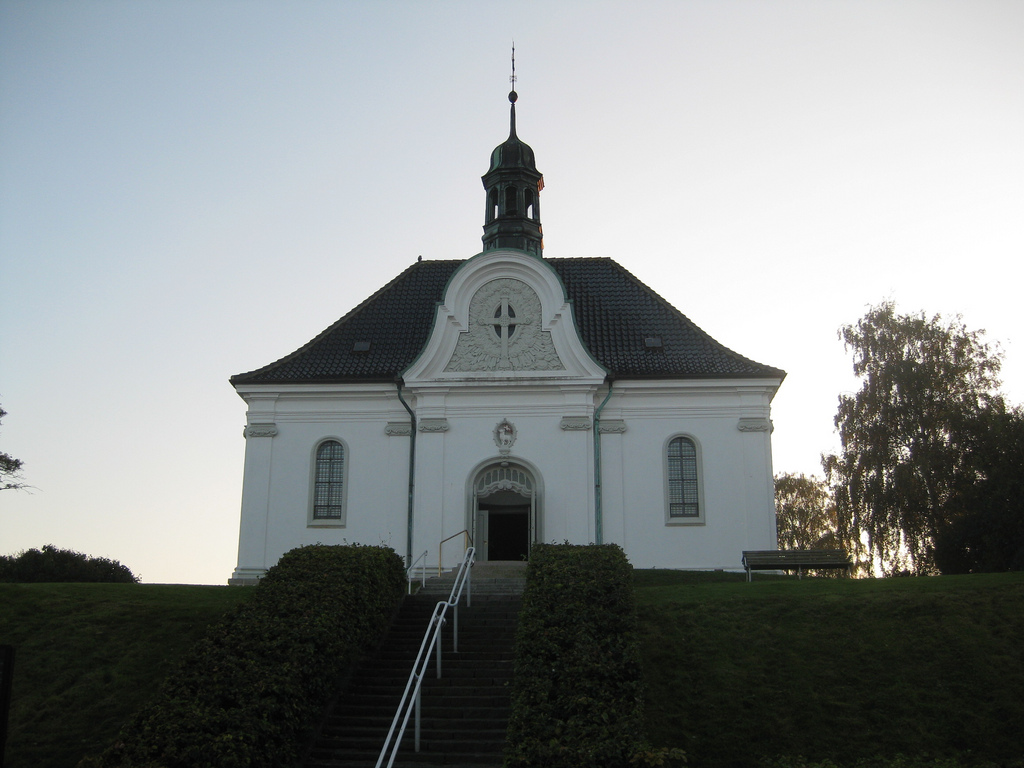
Hellebæk Church

Hellebæk Church overlooks the Øresund. The Neo-Baroque building is from 1920 and was designed by Søren Lemche.

Post-World War II architecture includes Jørn Utzon's own house from 1952 and his son Kim Utzon's own house (Odinshøjvej 21) from 1987 as well as Bøje Lundgaard's Sjølund development.

In the case of war, the Danish government and royal family would move into a bunker at Hellebæk (Regan Øst), prior to the construction of 60 metre deep nuclear bunker Regan Vest in the Rold Skov.

== Transport ==
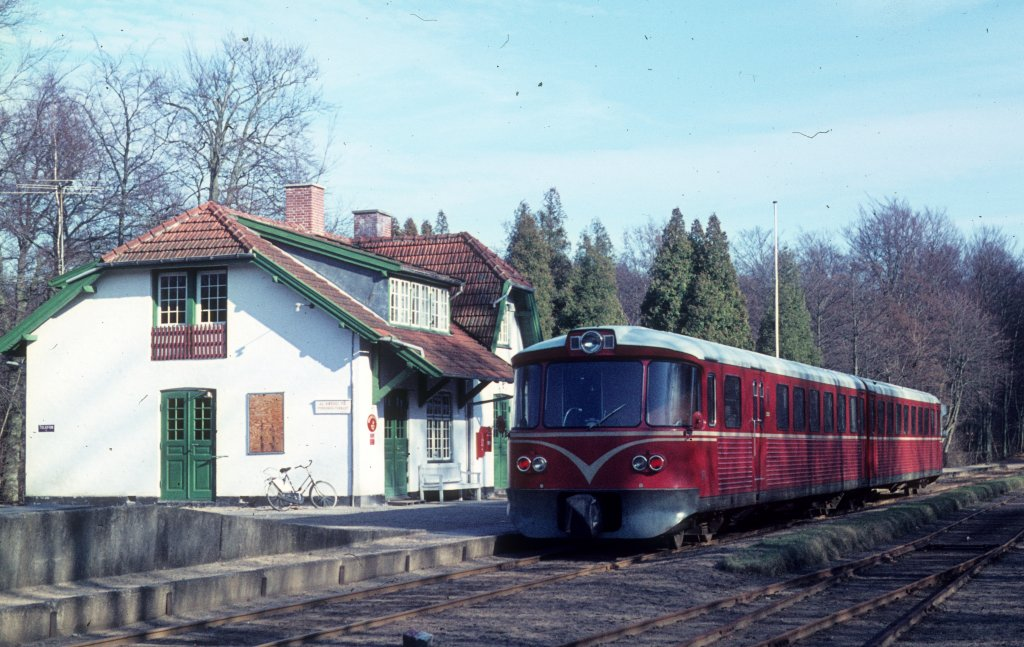
Hellebæk railway station

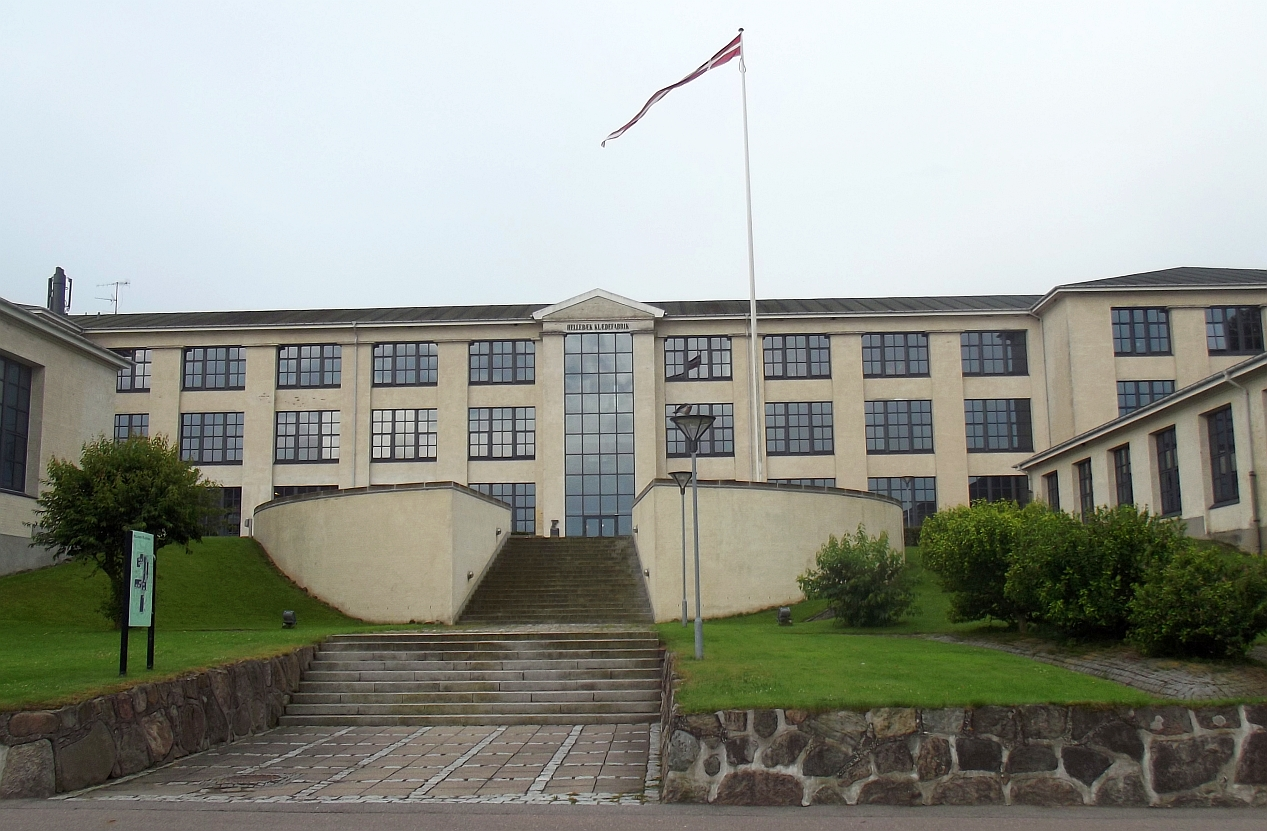
Hellebæk old factory

Hellebæk is situated on Nordre Strandvej ("Northern Coastal Road"). The town is served by Hellebæk railway station located on the Hornbæk Line.

== Cultural references ==
- Friedrich Leopold zu Stolberg-Stolberg has written a 1776 poem to "Hellebeck. Eine Seeländische Gegend".

== Notable people ==
- August Schiøtt (1823 – 1895 in Hellebæk) a Danish portrait painter
- Louise Thomsen (1823–1907) a pioneering photographer, ran a photographic business in Hellebæk
- Vilhelm Groth (1842-1899), painter, his best works were along the shores of Lillebælt and Hellebæk.
- Johanne Münter (1844 – 1921 in Hellebæk) a Danish writer and women's rights activist
- Mogens Venge (1912–1996 in Hellebæk) a Danish field hockey player who competed in the 1936 and 1948 Summer Olympics
- Jørn Utzon (1918-2008), Danish architect, designed Sydney Opera House in Australia.
- Preben Mahrt (1920 in Hellebæk – 1989) Danish film actor, 68 films between 1941 and 1976
- Jan Utzon (born 1944) Danish architect, completed the Esbjerg Performing Arts Centre
- Lin Utzon (born 1946) Danish designer of abstract decorative works, spent her childhood in Hellebæk
- Camilla Kampmann (born 1968), businesswoman and politician, lives in Hellebæk
- Naja Utzon Popov (born 1973), Danish sculptor, textile designer, ceramicist and artist
- Michael Strabo (born 1975), Danish investor and financier, spent his youth living in Hellebæk
