= Venge =

Venge is a surname. Notable people with the surname include:

- Christian Venge (born 1972), Spanish cyclist
- Mogens Venge (1912–1996), Danish field hockey player
