= Richard Leplastrier =

Australian architect (born 1939)

Richard Leplastrier AO
- Born: Richard Denis Leplastrier; 1939 (age 86–87); Melbourne
- Education: University of Sydney
- Occupation: Architect
- Years active: 1964—
- Spouse: Karen Lambert
- Children: 3
- Awards: AIA Gold Medal 1999; Sir Zelman Cowen Award for Public Architecture 2003; National Award for Enduring Architecture 2020; New South Wales Enduring Architecture Award 2020
- Buildings: Palm Garden House, Tom Uren House, Design Centre Tasmania, Bellingen House

Richard Denis Leplastrier AO (born 1939) is an Australian architect and educator. He is a recipient of the AIA Gold Medal and co-winner of the Sir Zelman Cowen Award for Public Architecture.

== Early life and education ==
Richard Denis Leplastrier was born in 1939. He grew up in Perth, Hobart, and then Sydney.

He graduated from the School of Architecture, Design and Planning at the University of Sydney in 1963.

In 1966 he travelled to Japan to study at Kyoto University under Tomoya Masuda, and worked in the office of Kenzo Tange.

== Career ==
=== Architecture ===
Leplastrier worked in the Palm Beach boat shed office of Jørn Utzon from 1964 to 1966, on a number of Utzon's designs for homes for his family plot at Bayview on Pittwater, which were never built.

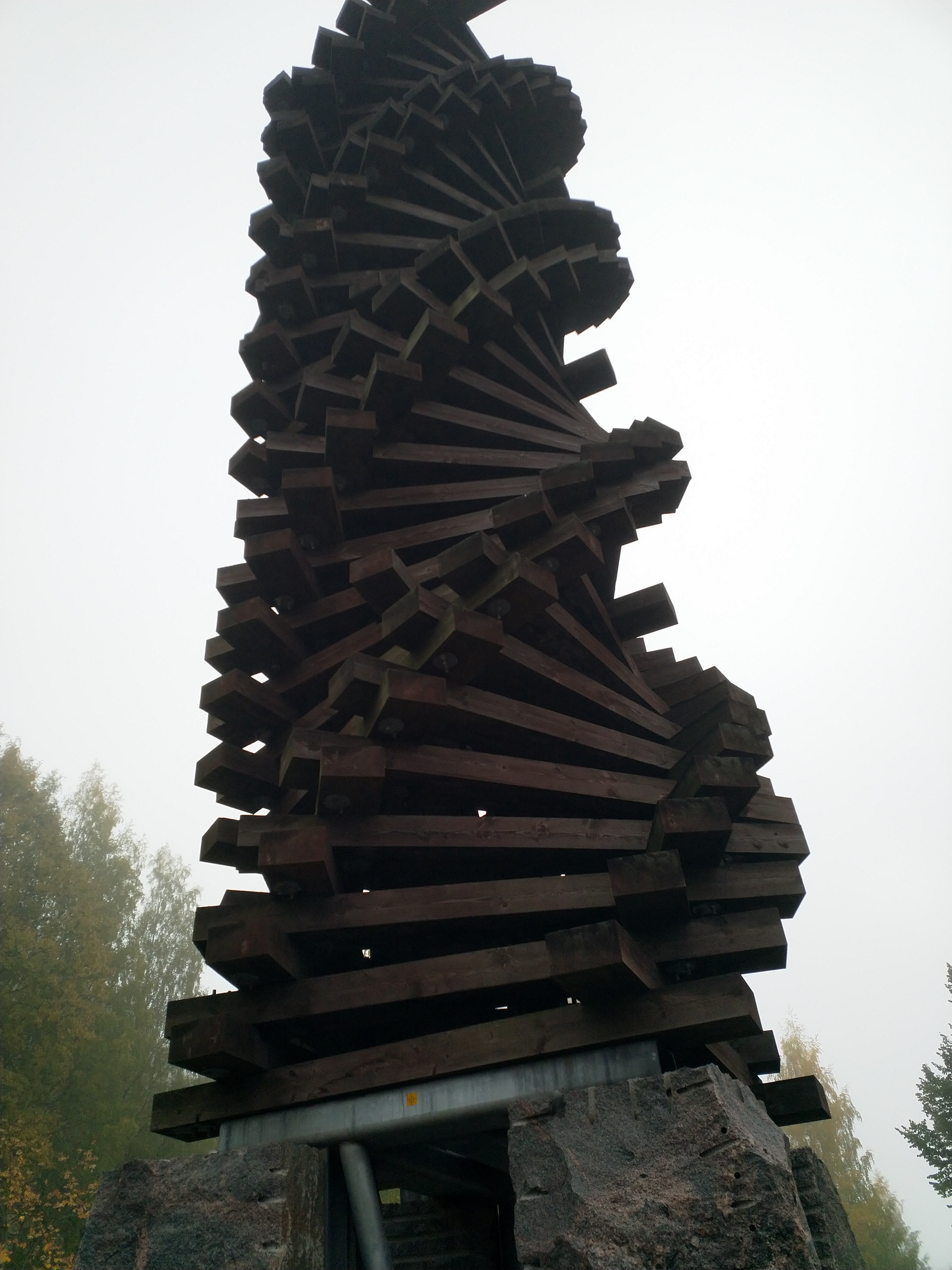
Structure designed by Leplastrier in Lahti, Finland

He established his own practice in 1970 and works from his studio in Sydney's Lovett Bay. He teaches master classes for beginning and established architects with his colleagues Glenn Murcutt and Peter Stutchbury.

One of the most well-known residences designed by Leplastrier is "the Bilgola house", aka Palm Garden House, at Bilgola Beach, Sydney. Architect and urban planner Philip Thalis said that it is considered within the profession as one of the best houses built during the 1970s anywhere in the world. This house had elements he used again in later houses, "similarly reconnect[ing] their occupants to the natural rhythms of life", including his own house at Lovett Bay (1994), which is accessible only by boat, and the Pittwater house (1995). The house has no glass, and no windows.

He has worked extensively with the Sydney Harbour Federation Trust, helping to ensure that the public lands around the harbour remain "accessible, protected, and valued for their natural and cultural significance".

His work is greatly influenced by his work with Kenzo Tange, Jørn Utzon, and Australian artist Lloyd Rees.

=== Academia ===
Leplastrier was a professor of practice (architecture) at the University of Newcastle until 2019, a role shared with other prominent architects.

== Selected works ==
- 1974–1976: Palm Garden House, Bilgola Beach, Sydney
- 1981–1984 and 1989–1990: Bellingen House and Studio, Bellingen, New South Wales
- 1988–1991: Rainforest House, Mapleton, Queensland
- 1988–1992: Tom Uren House, Balmain, Sydney
- 1994: Lovett Bay house, Sydney (his own)
- 1996: Cloudy Bay Retreat, Bruny Island, Tasmania
- 1997: Watsons Bay House, Sydney
- 1997–1998 and 2000: Blue Mountains House and Studio, Leura, New South Wales
- 2002: Design Centre Tasmania, Launceston, Tasmania, (with David Travalia)
- 2003: Birabahn (Indigenous Centre) at the University of Newcastle (with Peter Stutchbury and Sue Harper)
- 2004–2006: Georges Head Lookout, Mosman, Sydney (in collaboration with landscape architect Craig Burton)

== Recognition and awards ==
According to architect Peter Stutchbury in 1999: "It is not possible to summarise Richard Leplastrier's contribution to architecture because it extends beyond the built work. He is an educator, craftsperson, facilitator, and inspiration to all who meet him".

=== Architecture awards ===
- 1996: New South Wales Royal Australian Institute of Architects Special Jury Award
- 1999: Royal Australian Institute of Architects Gold Medal
- 2004: Spirit of Nature Wood Architecture Award, in Finland
- 2009: Dreyer Foundation Prize of Honour, for his commitment to sustainability
- 2003: Sir Zelman Cowen Award for Public Architecture, for his design of the Aboriginal Studies Faculty at University of Newcastle (with Peter Stutchbury and Sue Harper)

=== Honours and other awards ===
On 13 June 2011, Leplastrier was made an Officer of the Order of Australia for distinguished service to architecture, particularly through the application of environmentally sensitive design, and as an educator and mentor.

In October 2025, he was awarded the Bettison & James Award at the Adelaide Film Festival. This award is given to an individual "whose lifelong work has benefited the Australian community".

=== Legacy ===
At the 2020 NSW Chapter AIA Architecture Awards the Palm Garden House at Bilgola Beach was presented the New South Wales Enduring Architecture Award. Later in 2020 at the national awards the Palm Garden House was awarded the National Award for Enduring Architecture by the Australian Institute of Architects.

== In film ==
The film Richard Leplastrier: Framing the View is a 2020 feature-length documentary film about Leplastrier, directed by Anna Cater. The film began with the filming of the design and construction of a house in Blackheath in the Blue Mountains, and covers other homes designed by him in Balmain, Watsons Bay, and Leura, and has a major focus on the Bilgola house.

The film premiered on ABC Television on 12 May 2020. It was also shown in the Adelaide Film Festival at a special free screening, as part of the presentation of the James and Bettison Prize, along with a forum.

== Personal life ==
Leplastrier lives a reclusive life at his one-roomed home. In 2000 (when filming of Framing the View started), his three children were 8, 12 and 15 years old. Influenced by Japanese houses and style of living, the family ate and slept on the floor.

He has close friends who are regarded as family. Adrian Carter, who features in the film, co-authored a book with Leplastrier called Ethos.
