= Louise Thomsen =

Danish photographer (1823–1907)

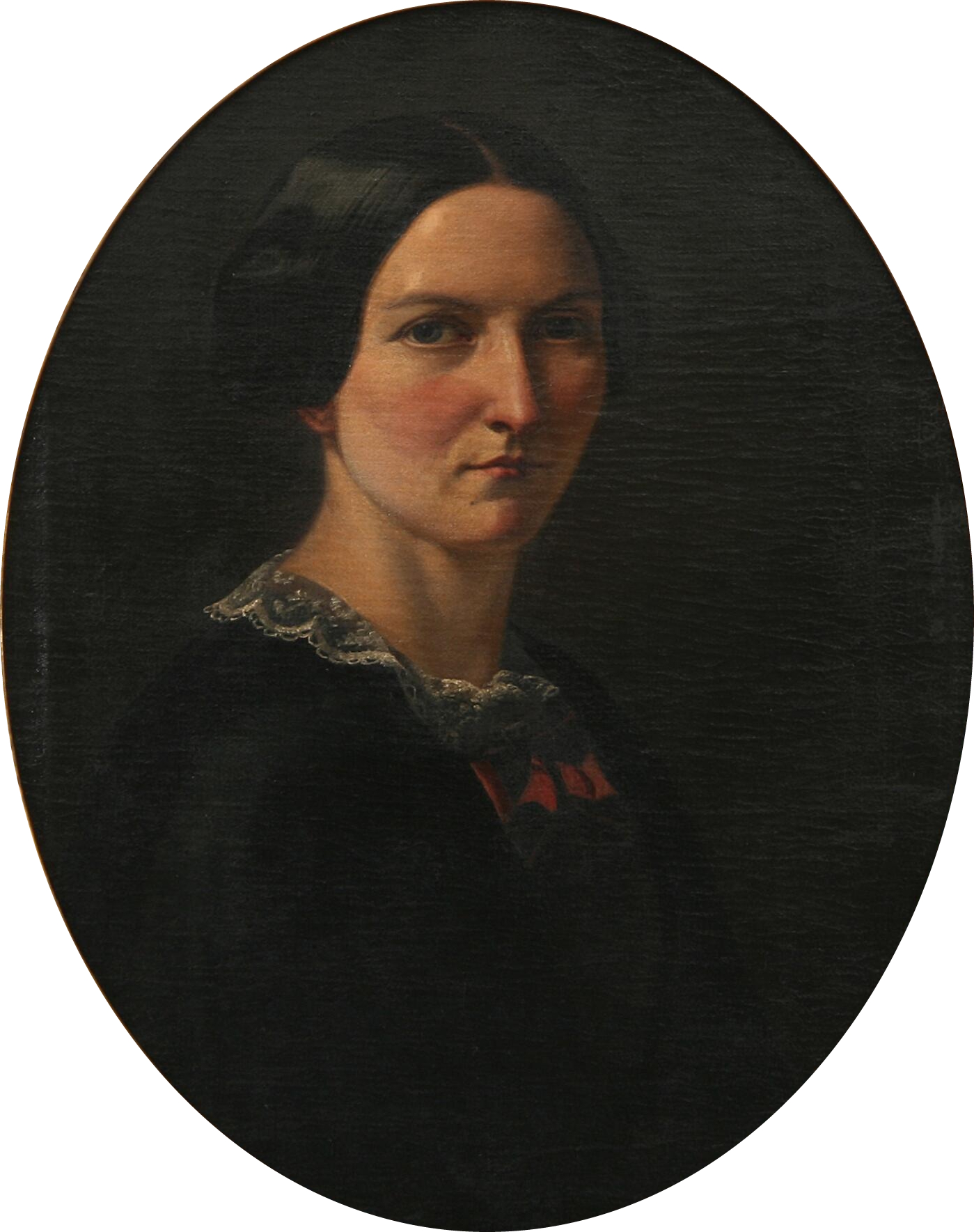
Louise Thomsen painted by her husband Frederich Gottfried Thomsen

Marie Louise Thomsen née Molbech (1823–1907) was a pioneering Danish photographer who ran a photographic business in Hellebæk in the north of Zealand from the early 1860s. Many of the photographs she took in the area near her home have been preserved and are published in Jesper Godvin Hansen's Fotografen Louise Thomsen 1823–1907.

== Biography ==
Born in Sorø on 26 February 1823, Marie Louise Molbech was the daughter of the schoolteacher Carl Frederik Molbech (1785–1864) and his wife Catharina Maria Schertner (1782–1860). She had two older brothers. After matriculating from Frederiksborg lærde skole in Hillerød she became a private tutor for her cousin's children in Frederiksyndest near Fredensborg.

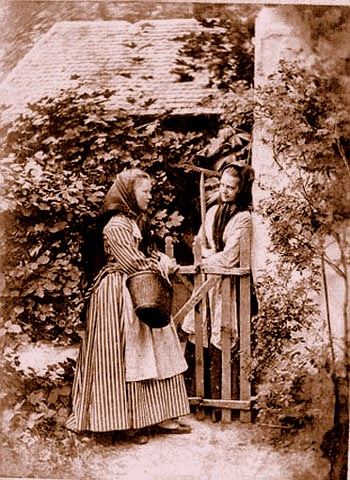
Photo by Marie Louise Thomsen

On 14 June 1856, she married Frederich Gottfried Thomsen (1819–1891). In 1862, the family moved to the house known as Skovhuset in Hellebæk where they spent the rest of their lives.

In August 1864 and frequently thereafter the Helsingør Avis published an advertisement announcing that portraits would be taken in the former forester's house in Hellebæk. The Royal Danish Library has several portraits taken by Thomsen. On the back, they are stamped: "Photogr. af L. Thomsen, Hellebæk" (photographed by L. Thomsen, Hellebæk). She became known as a competent photographer.

Marie Louise Thomsen died on 16 June 1907.
