= Hermann Kaufmann =

Austrian architect

- Born: 11 June 1955 (age 71); Reuthe, Austria
- Education: Technical University of Innsbruck; Technical University of Vienna
- Occupation: Architect
- Awards: Global Award for Sustainable Architecture (2007)

Hermann Kaufmann (born 11 June 1955 in Reuthe, Bregenzerwald) is an Austrian architect.

== Early life ==
Hermann Kaufmann was born in 1955 in Reuthe, Bregenzerwald (Austria) and comes from a family with a long tradition in the carpentry business. At that time it was a matter of course to help in the parental business where he got to know great directly the possibilities and the fascination of the building material wood but also the way of technical thinking what moulded essentially his work as an architect. The decision to study architecture was also influenced by his uncle Leopold Kaufmann, outrider in wood constructions and protagonist of the architectural development in Vorarlberg, under whom he learned as intern the hand tools of an architect. He graduated his studies at the University in Innsbruck and the Technical University in Vienna, where he was essentially shaped by his teacher Professor Ernst Hiesmayr.

== Work ==
, After two years of practice in Architecture, 1983 he founded his own architectural office Hermann Kaufmann ZT consortium with Christian Lenz in Schwarzach.

His teaching career began in the winter semester of 1995/96 as a guest lecturer at the Liechtenstein School of Engineering. This was followed by guest professorships at the TU Graz and the University of Ljubljana. In April 2002, he was appointed as a university professor at the Faculty of Architecture at the Technical University of Munich, where he headed the Chair of the Institute for Architectural Design and Building Technology until his retirement in spring 2021. His teaching focused on design using timber, with the emphasis on eco-friendly processes and the creation of a healthy environment. The key topic of interest was how wood, as a biogenous material, can help to optimize the use of resources in construction and create a healthy living environment without compromising architectural quality.

Hermann kaufmann is a member of several associations, including the Austrian Federal Chamber of Engineers and the Central Association of Austrian Architects.

In 2018 Hermann Kaufmann ZT evolved to HK Architekten, Hermann Kaufmann + Partner. Since Hermann Kaufmann's retirement at the Technical University of Munich, he continues his architectural practice in the office.

== Awards ==
On 24 September 2007, Kaufmann was awarded the first Global Award for Sustainable Architecture. In 2010 Kaufmann received the Spirit of Wood Architecture Award, which is awarded in Finland.

Also received: Schweighofer Innovation Award (2013), Werkbund label (2018), German Timber Construction Prize (2017), German Architecture Prize (2017), Bavarian Architecture Prize and Bavarian State Prize for Architecture (2021)

== Publications ==
- Hausladen, Gerhard; Kaufmann, Hermann (2008). Hausladen, Gerhard; Saldanha, Michael; Liedl, Petra (eds.). ClimateSkin : building-skin concepts that can do more with less energy. ISBN 978-3-7643-7725-0.
- Kaufmann, Hermann; Krötsch, Stefan; Winter, Stefan (2018). Manual of Multistorey Timber Construction. ISBN 978-3955533946.
