= Utzon's House in Hellebæk =

Building in Helsingør Municipality, Denmark

Coordinates: 56°03′43″N 12°33′38″E

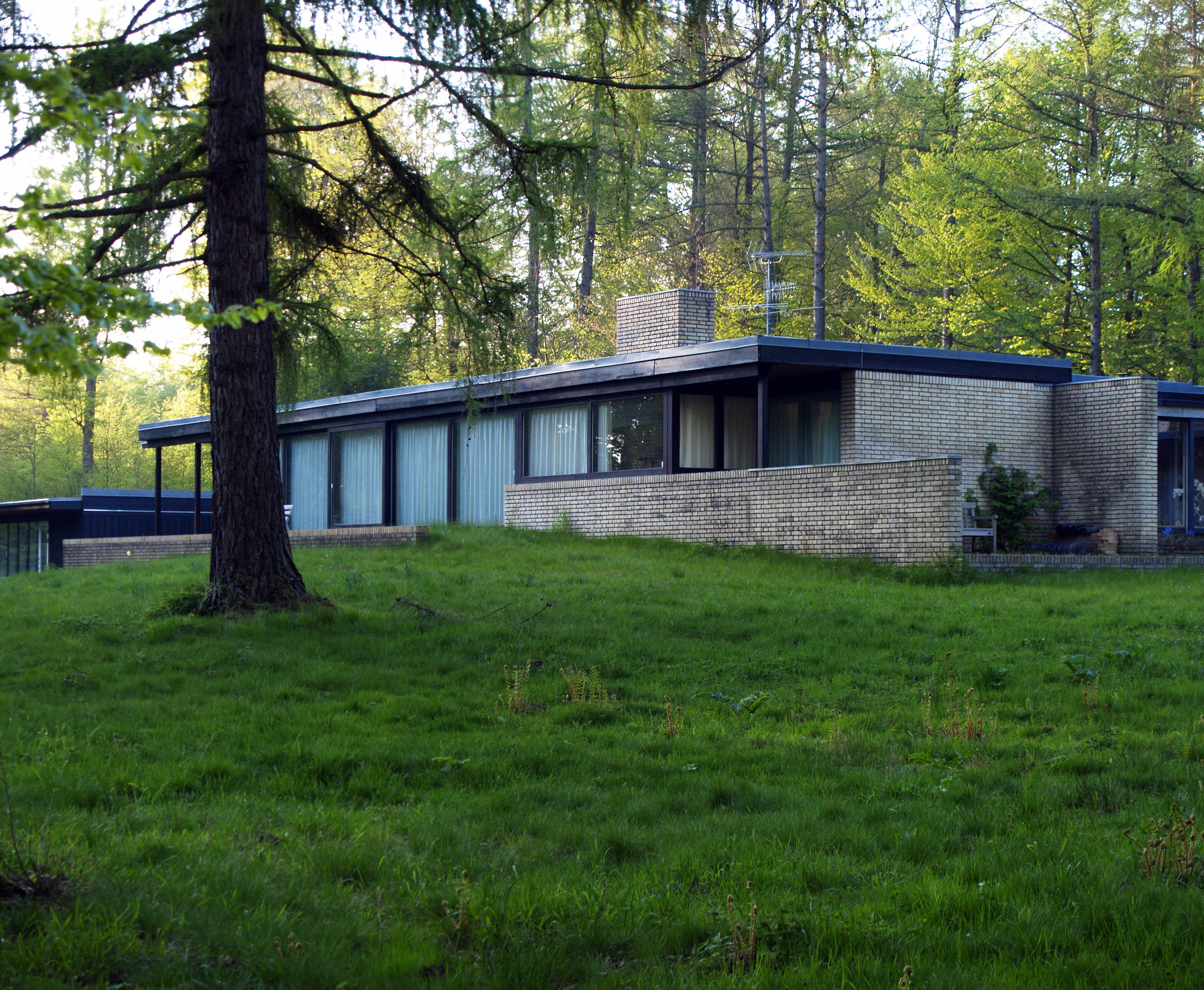
Jorn Utzon's house, Hellebæk

Utzon's House in Hellebæk is a one-storey private home in Hellebæk, not far from Helsingør, in Denmark's northern Zealand. Built by the world-famous architect Jørn Utzon for his family and himself in 1952, its innovative design was welcomed by the world of architecture.

== History ==
Apart from a watertower in Svaneke on Bornholm, this was Utzon's first completed work although he had already won many competitions. During the Second World War, Utzon went to Stockholm to study the work of Gunnar Asplund. In the winter of 1943–44, there was an exhibition of modern American architecture where Utzon was particularly taken by Frank Lloyd Wright's houses which led him to study Wright's work in more detail. Wright's concern with nature and the characteristics of each building site as well as the need for attention to internal and external space convinced him that each project required its own special approach.

After his family moved to Helsingør in 1937, Utzon—who was then 18—became ever more attached to the area. The house remained his base for the rest of his life. "It's my laboratory," he once commented. It was in his Hellebæk study that he began working on the design of the Sydney Opera House in 1959.

When Utzon started building the house on the edge of Hellebæk Forest just outside the small town of Hellebæk, it was rumoured that an innovative approach to one-family homes was in the making. Architects of considerable repute visited the site to monitor progress. Utzon himself directed the building work without any technical plans. As the building developed, he would often change its shape, rather like building a sand castle. He had learnt this approach in Finland in 1946 when he had spent a few months with Alvar Aalto who had used exactly the same method for his Villa Mairea. Aalto maintained it was the most economical solution for his client.

== Architecture ==
A long, narrow, one story building with a flat-roof, it rises slightly above the gently sloping site on a brick platform. The southern facade consists solely of windows, allowing lots of light into the open-plan living room with a freestanding fireplace. The bedrooms have no windows apart from skylights.

After experimenting with a few models, Utzon tells us he first built a full-size wooden version of the house in order to gain an impression of how a house with 130 square metres of living space would look in practice. Careful consideration was given to the surroundings: sun, view and shelter from the wind. The result was that he decided to have a completely closed wall along the northern side and an open glass wall for the southern facade. The builders agreed to work under Utzon's direction without plans. The north wall was first completed so as to establish the basic geometry. The kitchen and bathroom were then added and the remaining rooms were arranged with movable pinewood partitions and doors in order to facilitate any subsequent alterations. The materials used inside and outside are the same: yellow-white bricks, Oregon pine and aluminium. Yellow tiling is used both at the top of the walls—with hard-baked tiles—and in the kitchen, grill niche and shower as well as for the fireplace. The absence of windows in the children's rooms along the north wall has been mentioned as a possible disadvantage but they were lit by skylights.

Utzon summed up his ideas about the house when he commented: "What is important for me is that the architectonic approach or system behind a house should not limit the house's function and thereby hamper life inside."

== Later developments ==
Not long before he died, Jørn Utzon had entrusted his son Jan with modernization work on the house and alterations to cater to his old age. The work was still in progress at the time of his death. In accordance with his own wishes, Utzon was buried in Hellebæk churchyard where his father and brother also rest.

== Influence ==
Utzon's design was widely imitated in the 1950s, first for one-family homes and later on a larger scale, when the Louisiana Museum in Humlebæk was built by Vilhelm Wohlert and Jørgen Bo in 1958. Halidor Gunnløgsson and Erik Christian Sørensen were among those who emulated Utzon's approach, developing a new Danish trend.

== See also ==
- Utzon's houses on Mallorca: Can Lis and Can Feliz
- Architecture of Denmark

== Literature ==
- Martin Keiding and Kim Dirckinck-Holmfeld (ed.), Utzon's own houses, Utzon Library, Copenhagen, Danish Architectural Press, 2004, 106 pages. ISBN 87-7407-316-8
- Christoffer Harlang and Finn Monies, Eget hus: om danske arkitekters egne hus i 1950'erne, Copenhagen, Arkitektens Forlag, 2003, 118 pages. ISBN 87-7407-268-4 (in Danish)
