= Spirit of Nature Wood Architecture Award =

Architecture prize

- Awarded for: Exemplifying a progressive and creative use of wood in architecture
- Sponsored by: Wood in Culture Association (Puu kulttuurissa ry)
- Reward: €40,000
- First award: 2000; 26 years ago

The Spirit of Nature Wood Architecture Award was an international architecture award, awarded every two years from 2000 until 2012, when it was discontinued.

== History and description ==
The award was founded by the Wood in Culture Association (Puu kulttuurissa ry), a Finnish association sponsored by the Finnish wood industry, in 2000.

The award was given to a person or group of persons whose work exemplifies a progressive and creative use of wood. The prize money was €40,000. The award was made at a ceremony held at the Sibelius Hall in the city of Lahti. The award was given a total of seven times, before it was discontinued in 2012. A few of the award winners afterwards received commissions to design a small structure in Lahti.

== Recipients of the Spirit of Nature Wood Architecture Award ==
Year	Recipient	Country	Ref
2000	Renzo Piano	Italy	
2002	Kengo Kuma	Japan	
2004	Richard Leplastrier	Australia	
2006	Peter Zumthor	Switzerland	
2008	José Cruz Ovalle	Chile	
2010	Hermann Kaufmann	Austria	
2012	Bijoy Jain	India	

== Structures in Lahti designed by Spirit of Nature Wood Architecture Award recipients ==
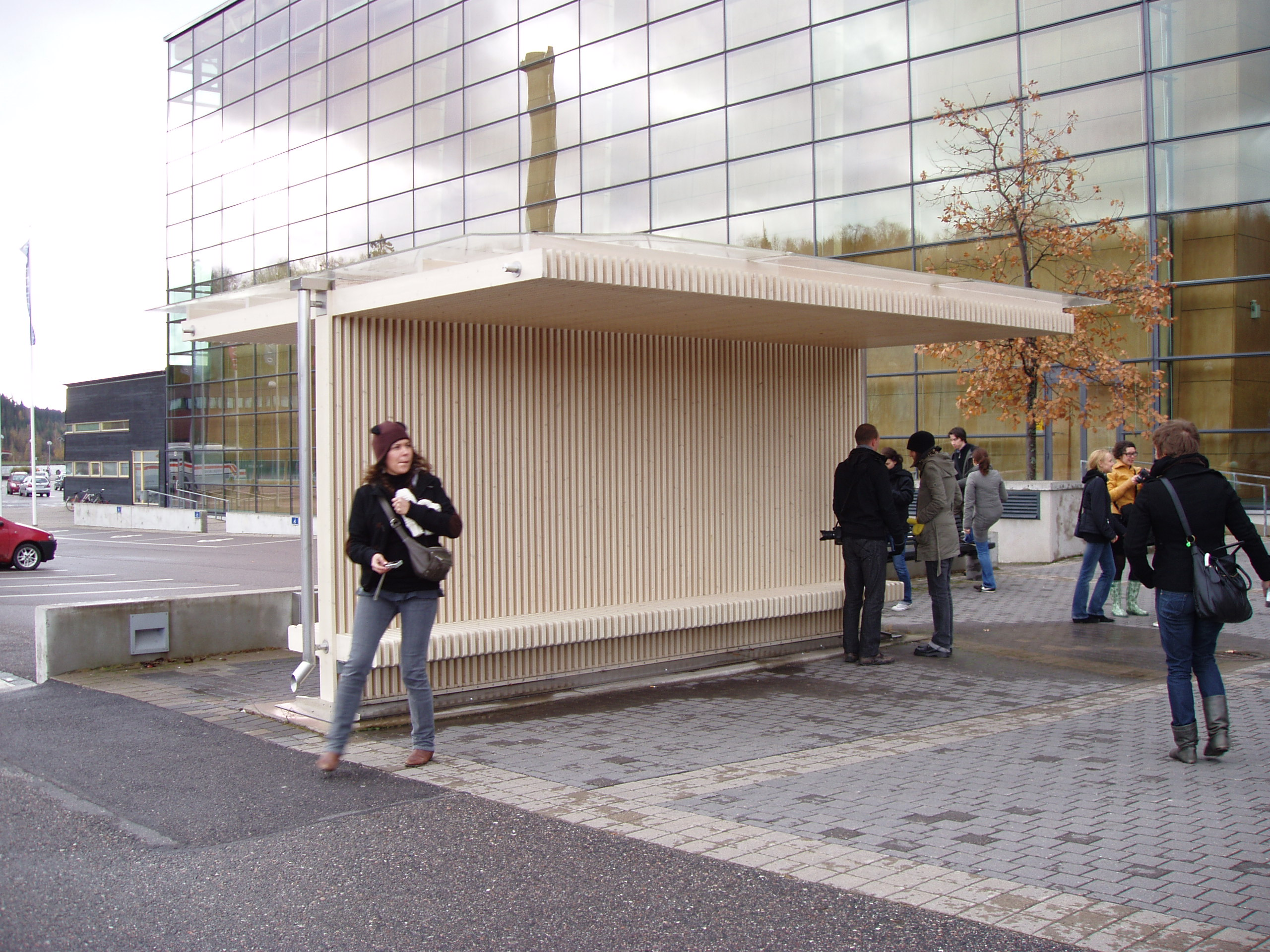
Kengo Kuma, bus shelter

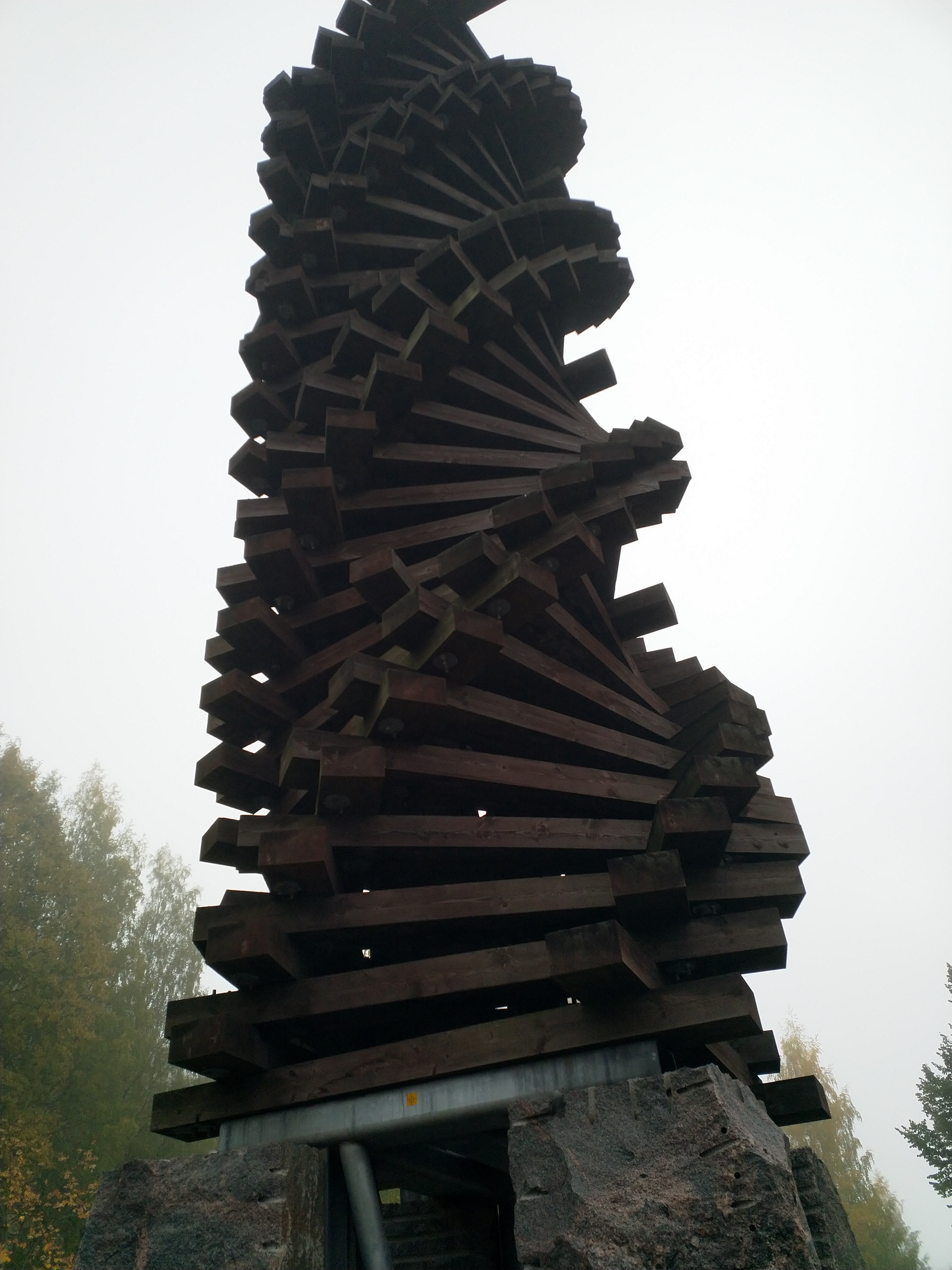
Richard Leplastrier wooden structure

== See also ==
- List of architecture awards
