= Adrian Carter =

English-born architect

Adrian Carter is an English-born architect. He was the founding director of the Utzon Center in Denmark, and has held various academic positions at a number of architectural schools, notably at Aalborg University and the Aarhus School of Architecture in Denmark, and Bond University in Australia, since 2014.

== Early life and education ==
Adrian Carter studied architecture at Portsmouth Polytechnic, England.

He then moved to Finland to work as a student trainee with architects Reima and Raili Pietilä in Helsinki. He then continued his studies at The Royal Danish Academy of Fine Arts School of Architecture Copenhagen, where he qualified as an architect, and later receiving an MPhil at the University of Cambridge, England.

== Career ==
=== Architecture ===
Carter then went to work as an assistant for architects Anchor, Mortlock and Woolley in Sydney, Australia. After this he moved to Norway to work as an assistant for architect Niels Torp in Oslo, during the design of the Aker Brygge harbour development in Oslo.

He then worked as an assistant for Danish architect Henning Larsen. Following that he worked for architects Dissing+Weitling in Copenhagen, during the design of the Storebælt Suspension Bridge.

=== Academia ===
Carter taught at the Aarhus School of Architecture from 2000 and in 2005 was appointed associate professor at the Department of Architecture and Design at Aalborg University, Denmark, and director of the Utzon Center (named after Jørn Utzon) in Aalborg. Carter has also taught at the Aarhus School of Architecture in Århus, Denmark. Under the auspices of Aalborg University, Carter initiated and established the Utzon Center and became its first director.

The Utzon Center building on the Aalborg harbour front was designed by Jørn Utzon in conjunction with his architect son Kim Utzon¹s office and opened to the public in May 2008.

Carter has been an honorary associate professor at the School of Architecture, Design and Planning at the University of Sydney and has acted as an advisor to the Australian Government Department of the Environment and Heritage in their nomination of the Sydney Opera House for inscription on the World Heritage List.

Carter was announced as Head of Discipline, Abedian School of Architecture, Bond University, Gold Coast, Australia, in 2014.

== In film ==
Carter features in the documentary film Richard Leplastrier: Framing the View, as a friend of Sydney architect Richard Leplastrier. He co-authored a book with Leplastrier called Ethos.
