= Utzon Center =

Museum in Aalborg, Denmark

Coordinates: 57°03′00″N 09°55′29″E

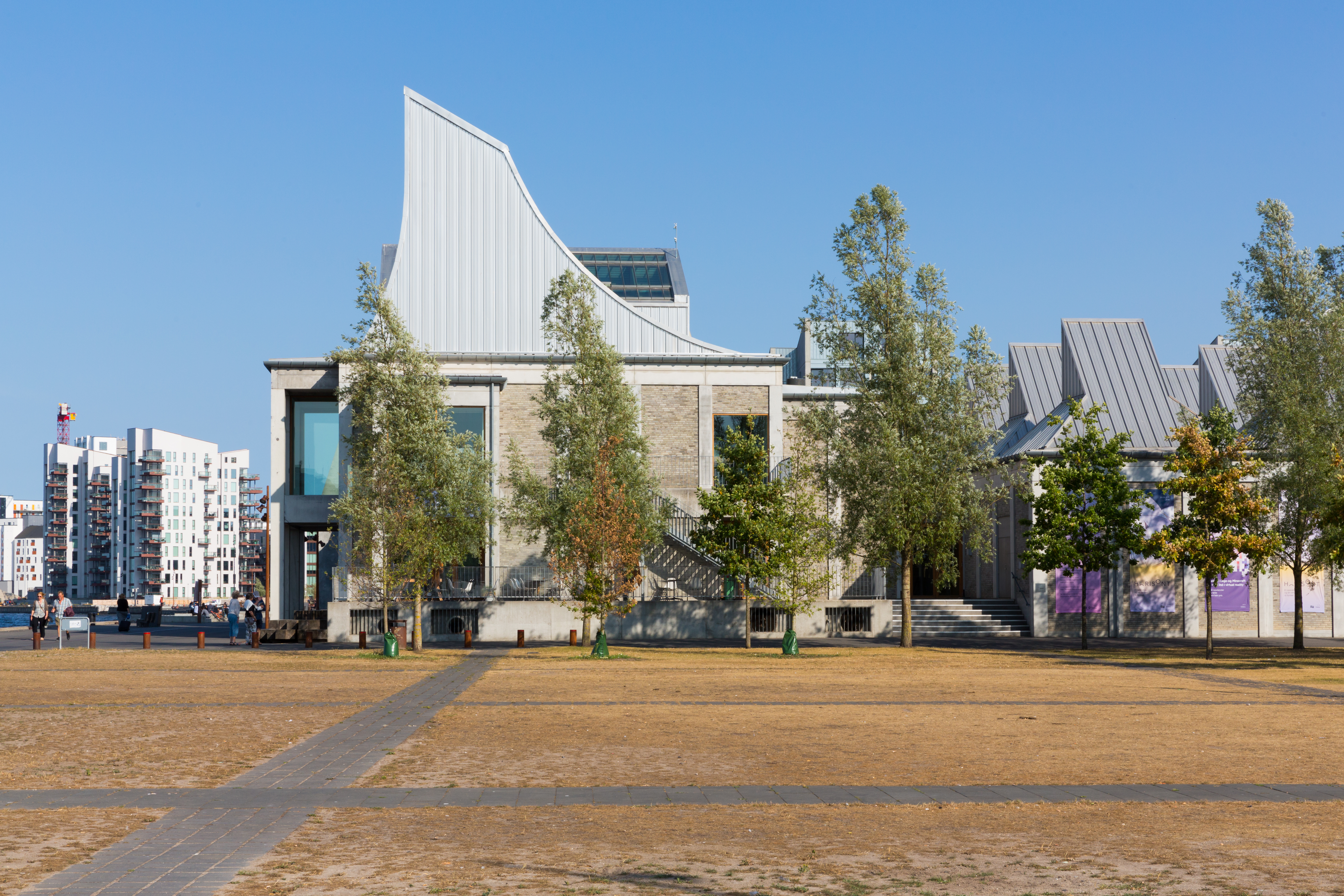
The Utzon Center, Aalborg

The Utzon Center in Aalborg, Denmark, was the last building to be designed by Jørn Utzon, the architect behind the Sydney Opera House. In collaboration with his son Kim, who provided the final construction drawings, he planned the centre not as a museum but as a place where students of architecture could meet and discuss their ideas for the future. Located on the Limfjord waterfront in the city where Utzon spent his childhood, the building was completed in 2008, the year Utzon died.

== Background ==
Jørn Utzon grew up in Aalborg, a harbour city in the north of Jutland. As a boy, he spent much of his time sailing on the Limfjord or at the wharf where his father, Aage Utzon, worked as a shipbuilding engineer and where Jørn became fascinated with ships and their intricate designs. These impressions would be a lasting inspiration for his later works.

But the idea of a centre came not from Utzon himself but from Aalborg University's School for Architecture and Design as a place where students could research and discuss architectural trends. At the initiative of Adrian Carter of the Architecture and Design School, the Utzon Research Center was established in 2003 with the objective of promoting understanding of Utzon's work. In August 2003, a symposium and a summer school brought together 150 participants from across the globe. Thanks to its success, economic support was received from Sydney, Australia, and major funding was allocated by the European Union and the Obel Foundation for the creation of an Utzon archive and research center, providing a basis for the Utzon Center itself. As a result, Utzon and his son Kim were invited to design plans for a new building. In August 2005, when he was 87 years old, the plans Utzon and his son Kim had completed for a 2,700 square metre exhibition and research centre on the Aalborg waterfront were presented to the press. The Utzon Foundation under university rector Finn Kjærsdam would be responsible for completing the project.

At the time, Jørn Utzon communicated his own ideas about the centre: "From the bottom of my heart I hope that the Utzon Center will be a place where good thoughts will meet, and where the students from the School of Architecture will go when they want to be together to discuss their ideas. It will be a power centre for architecture and human life in the future."

== Architecture ==
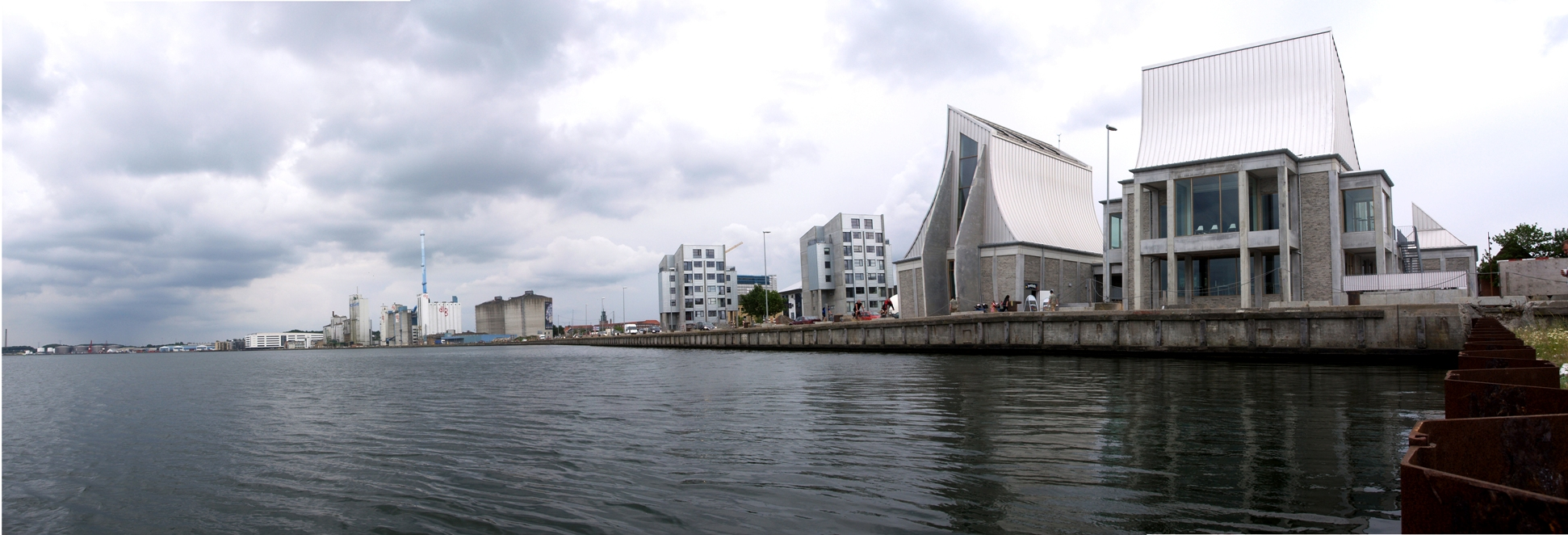
The Utzon Center on Aalborg's waterfront

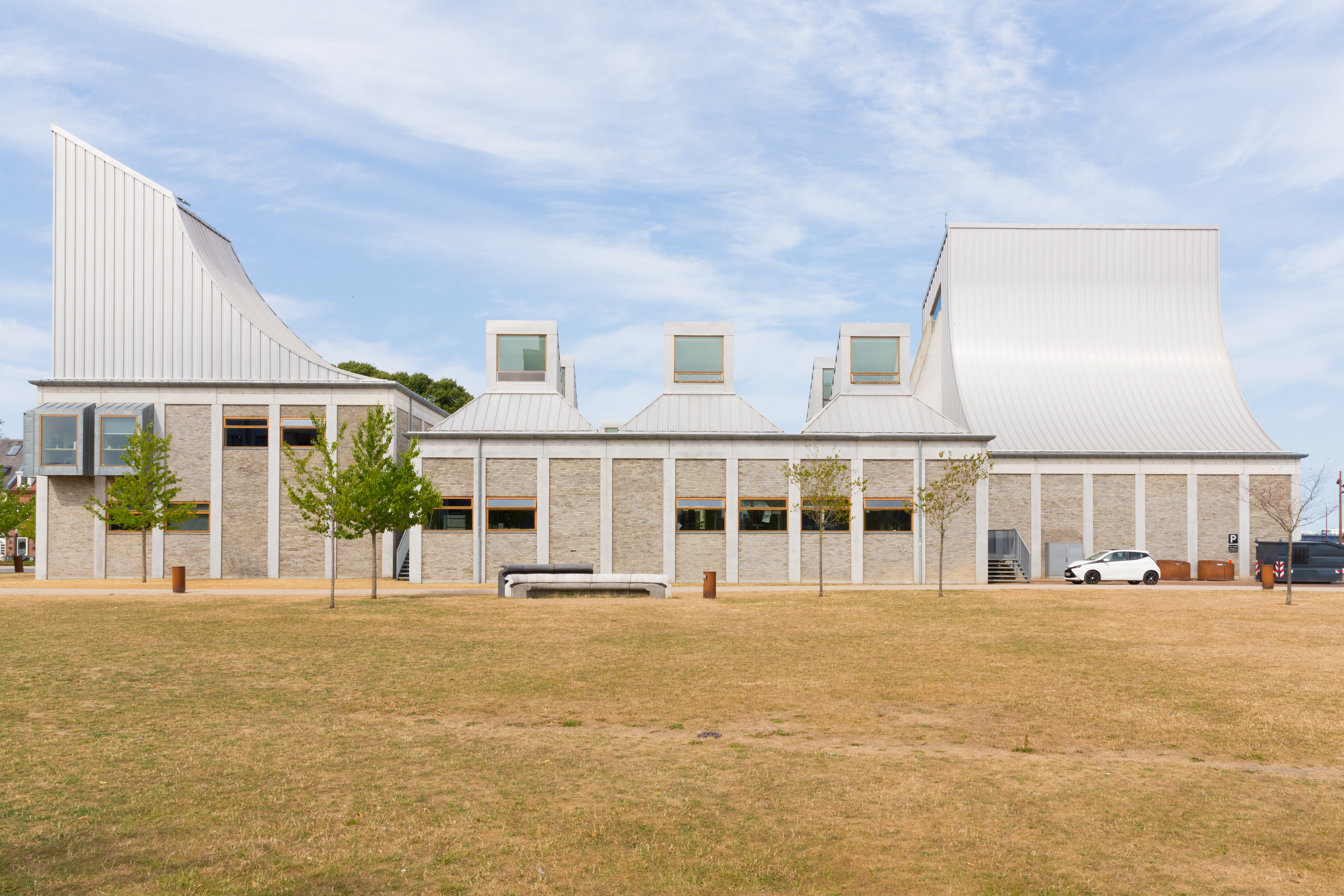
The eastern side of the building.

With its highly reflective, dramatically curved rooftops, the centre cannot be missed. The rather tent-like spaces they enclose are reminiscent of Utzon's times in the Middle East and the Mediterranean. Most of the rooms are impressively well lit, offering views out over the Limfjord. To protect visitors from the wind, Utzon has provided sheltered courtyards inside the complex which also contribute to the pleasure of eating in the outdoor area of the restaurant. The building has an open and welcoming look but at the same time has the protective feel of Utzon's houses on Mallorca and of Kim Utzon's other projects, some of which have an almost fortress-like appearance.

The centre consists of several individual buildings creating a special place around a courtyard on a platform. The tall sculptural roofs of the auditorium and the boathall, both on the harbour front, and the library facing the park area and the city are set off by the lower roofs of the exhibition and workshop areas inside the complex.

== The centre's role ==
The Utzon Research Center at Aalborg University is responsible for planning the centre's core activities. The top priority is to undertake research directed towards promoting the significance of Jørn Utzon's work and approach. This is achieved by organising workshops, conferences and exhibitions and disseminating their results for the benefit of the architecture profession and the general public.

The centre is not a museum immortalizing Utzon but rather a knowledge centre designed to convey an understanding of architecture in general and quality in the broadest sense. It also has lecture theatres and workshops as well as a library with bright study areas close to the windows. It also celebrates the boatbuilder Aage Utzon, the architect's father, and includes ships designed by him. There is also an archive of Utzon's original drawings.

The Utzon Center also hosts exhibitions of the work of other architects and has a programme of events of interest to the general public. In 2011, there was a special exhibition devoted to the architect Michael Singer, furniture designed by Jørn Utzon was displayed in the park, and there was a workshop where children could build models under the general theme of "Little Manhattan".

== Literature ==
- Stig Matthiesen, Bente Jensen, Thomas Mølvig, Utzon & Utzon Center Aalborg: glæden består ikke i at eje - men i at skabe, Aalborg, Utzon Center, 2011. 141 pages. (in Danish)
