= Mogens Venge =

Danish field hockey player (1912–1996)

Mogens Vendelbo Venge (29 March 1912 – 16 April 1996) was a Danish field hockey player who competed in the 1936 Summer Olympics and in the 1948 Summer Olympics.

== Biography ==
Venge was born in Copenhagen on 29 March 1912, and died in Hellebæk, Region Hovedstaden on 16 April 1996, at the age of 84.

In 1936 he was a member of the Danish team which was eliminated in the group stage of the Olympic tournament. He played both matches as back.

Twelve years later he was eliminated with the Danish team in the first round of the 1948 Olympic tournament. He played three matches as back.
