= Shaanxi Provincial TV Tower =

Telecommunications tower in China

Coordinates: 34°11′51.4″N 108°56′30.5″E

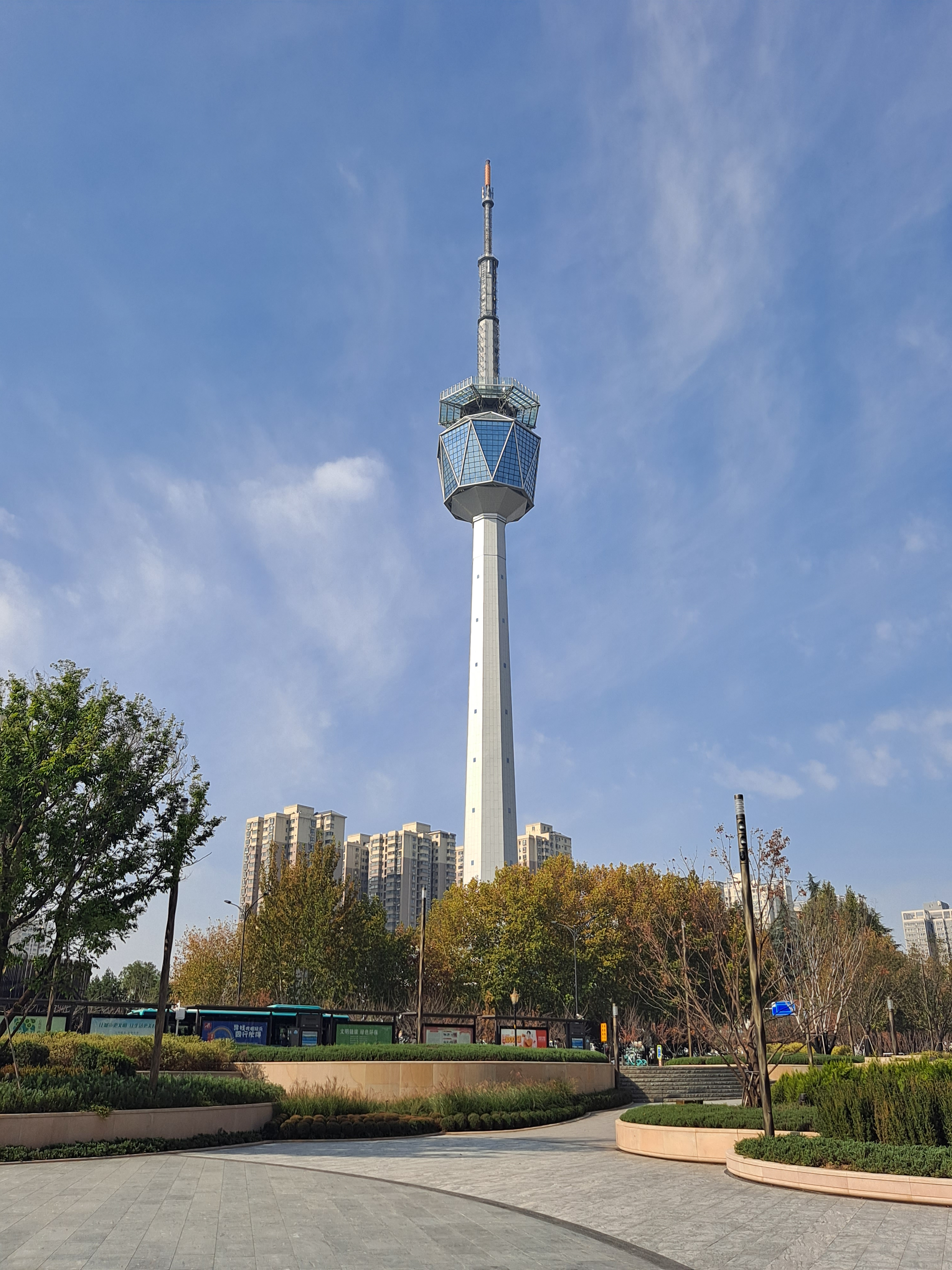

Shaanxi Radio & TV Tower (陕西广播电视塔) or Shaanxi TV Tower is a free standing concrete telecommunications tower built in 1987 in Xi'an, Shaanxi Province, China. It is 245 metres (804 ft) tall.

== See also ==
- List of towers
