= Paustian House =

Building in Copenhagen, Denmark

Coordinates: 55°42′46″N 12°35′29″E

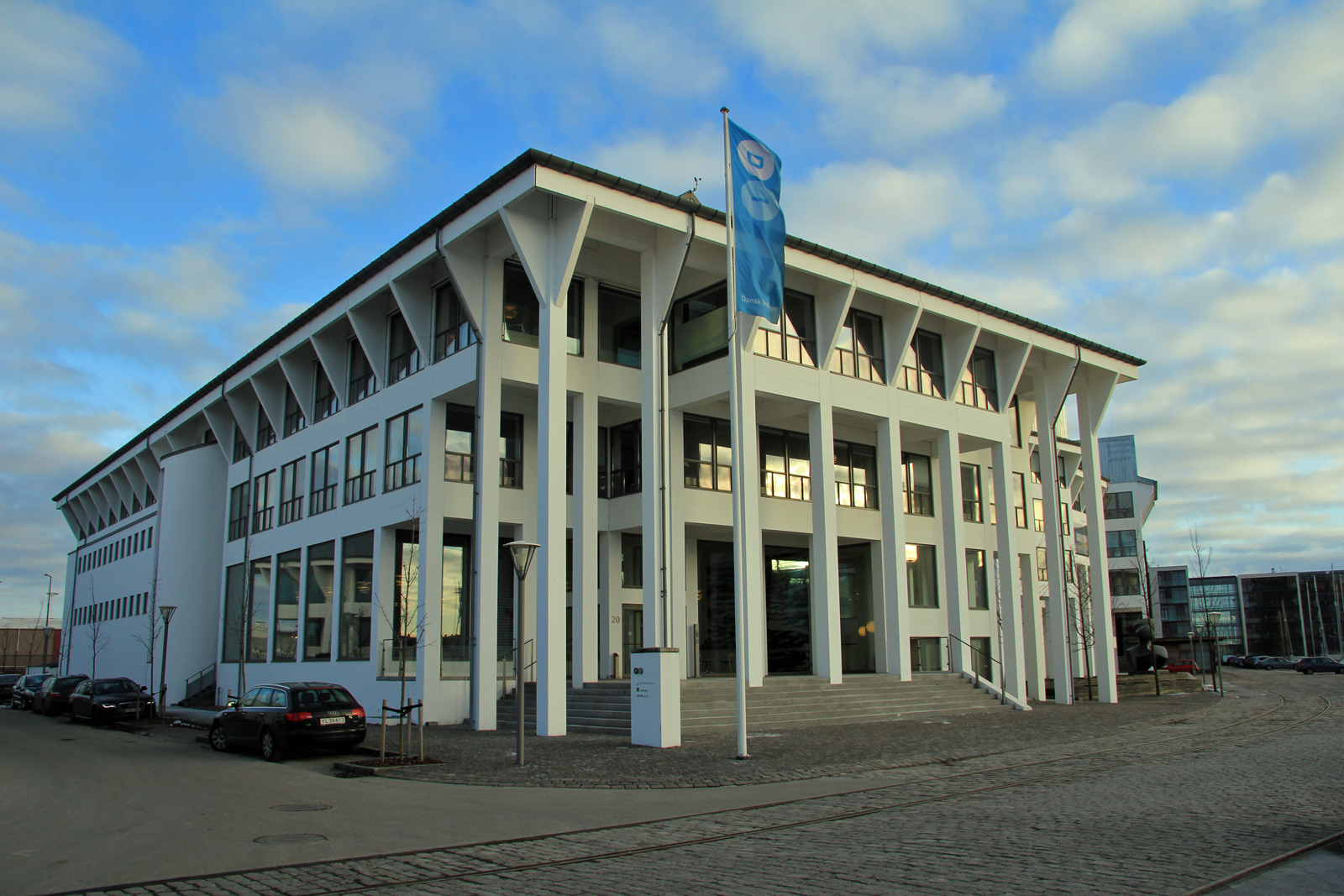
Paustian House, Copenhagen

Paustian House (Danish: Paustians Hus) is a prominent architectural landmark located on the waterfront of Nordhavn in Copenhagen, Denmark. Completed in 1987, it stands as one of the most significant works in Denmark by the renowned architect Jørn Utzon, who is also celebrated for designing the Sydney Opera House. The project was further developed with the addition of two adjacent buildings designed by Utzon's son, Kim, which were completed in 2000.

== Architecture ==
The genesis of the Paustian House dates back to 1985, when Ole Paustian, the owner of a thriving furniture business, approached Jørn Utzon with a request to design a showroom building on the Copenhagen waterfront, intended as an extension to one of his existing warehouses. Utzon conceived the initial design and sent sketches to his sons Jan and Kim, who then created the final drawings and construction plans.

Jørn Utzon drew inspiration for the Paustian House from his experiences walking through a Danish beech trees. In his own words: "Walking in a Danish beech forest is like going through a hall of pillars. This hall of pillars dissolves into branches and into a leafy crown represented by the roof." The result is a three-story structure that evokes the feeling of being within a forest, with a light and airy interior and expansive exhibition spaces. Externally, the building is characterized by its temple-like appearance, with external pillars that frame the structure along the harbor's edge.

Inside, tall white fan-topped columns stretch up to the ceiling where they are connected by geometrical archways. Utzon's son Kim, who helped with the original plans, went on to expand the complex with two new buildings housing a restaurant and a yacht club as well as extensions to the showrooms. The interior design, including the distinctive blue tiling along the wooden staircases, was contributed by Utzon's daughter, Lin Utzon.

While the original Paustian showroom has since relocated to another district, the Paustian House continues to be a significant architectural site in Copenhagen, now housing a different company.

== Gallery ==
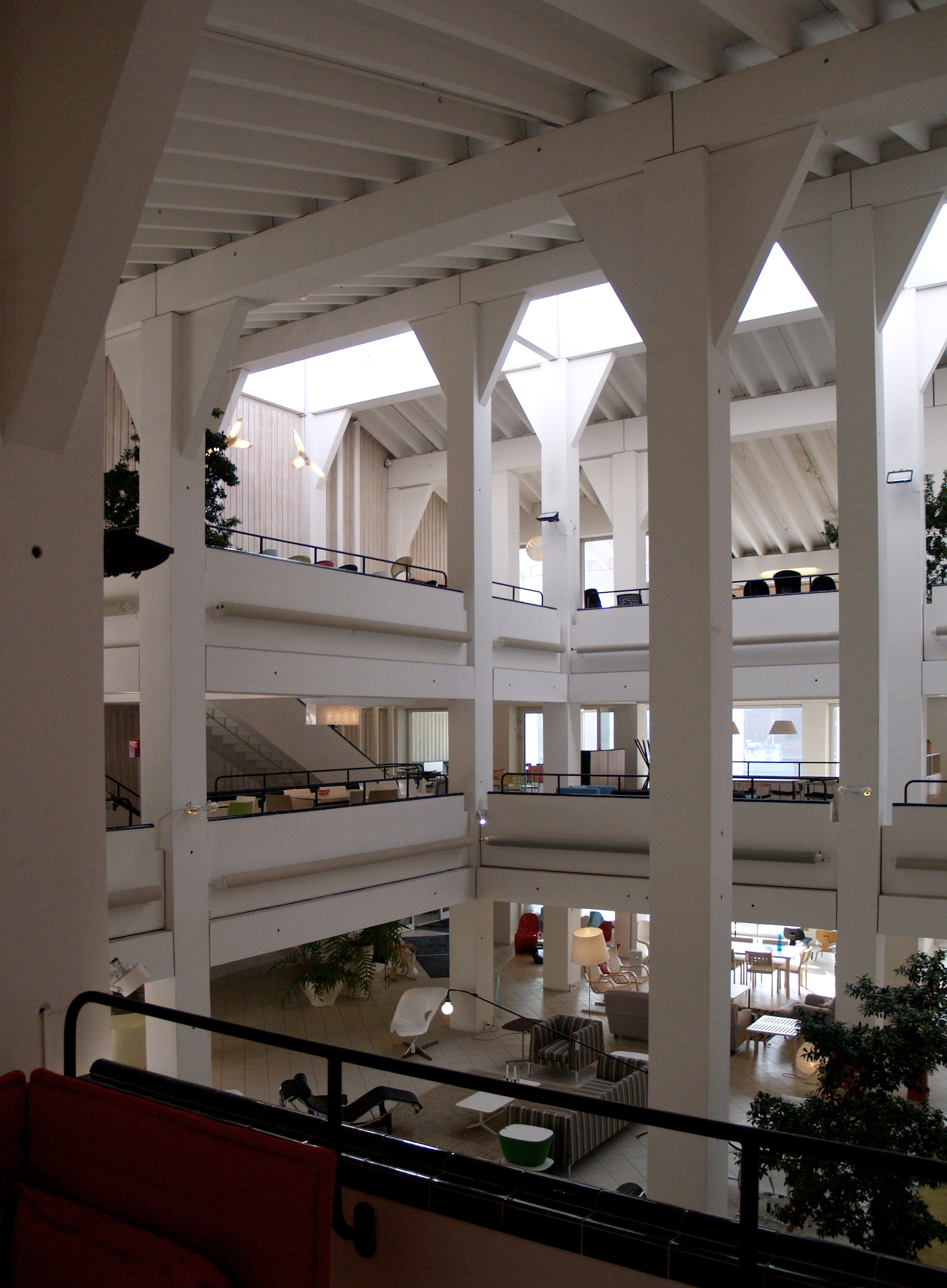
Interior forest of columns

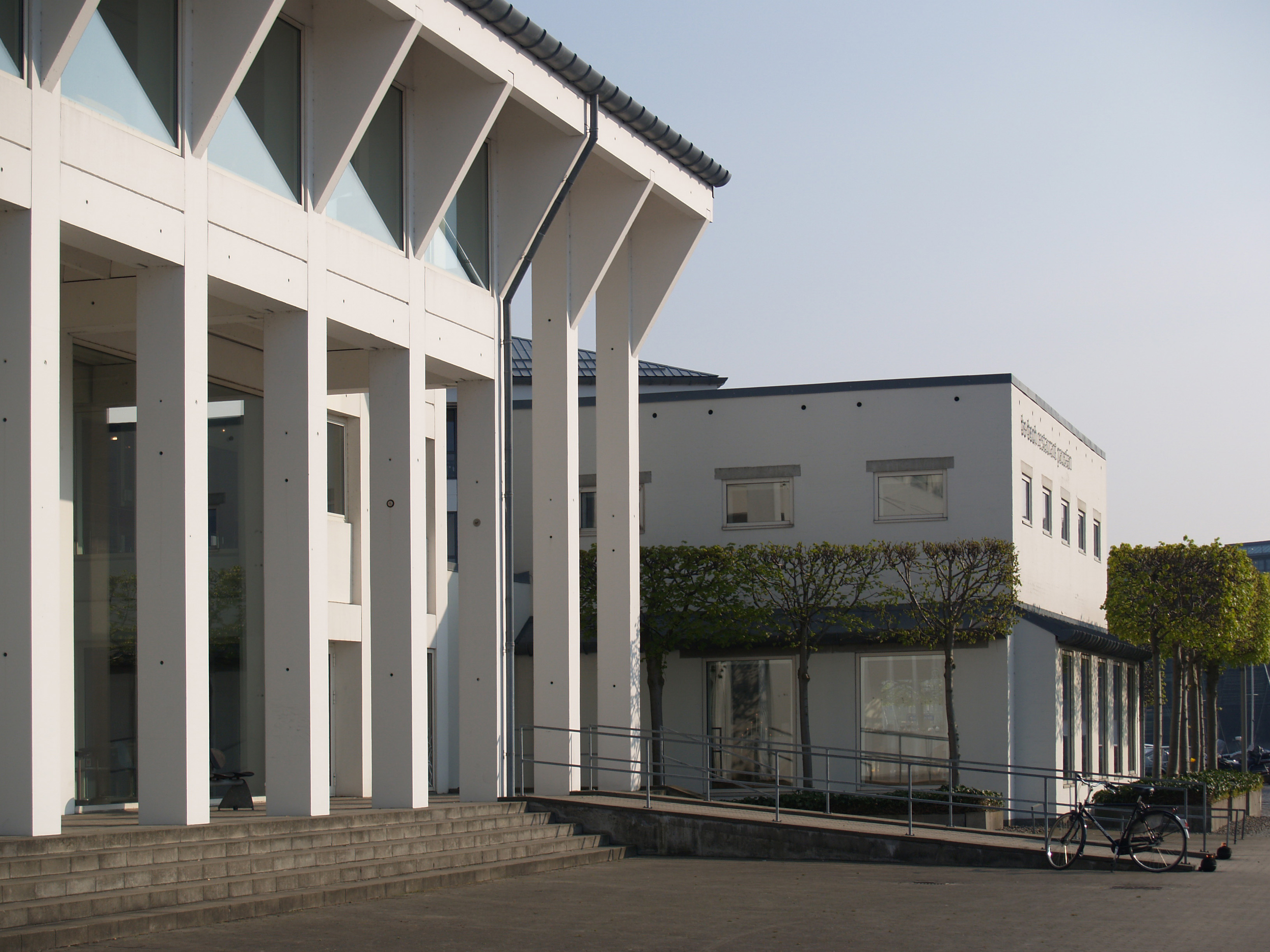
Showroom and restaurant

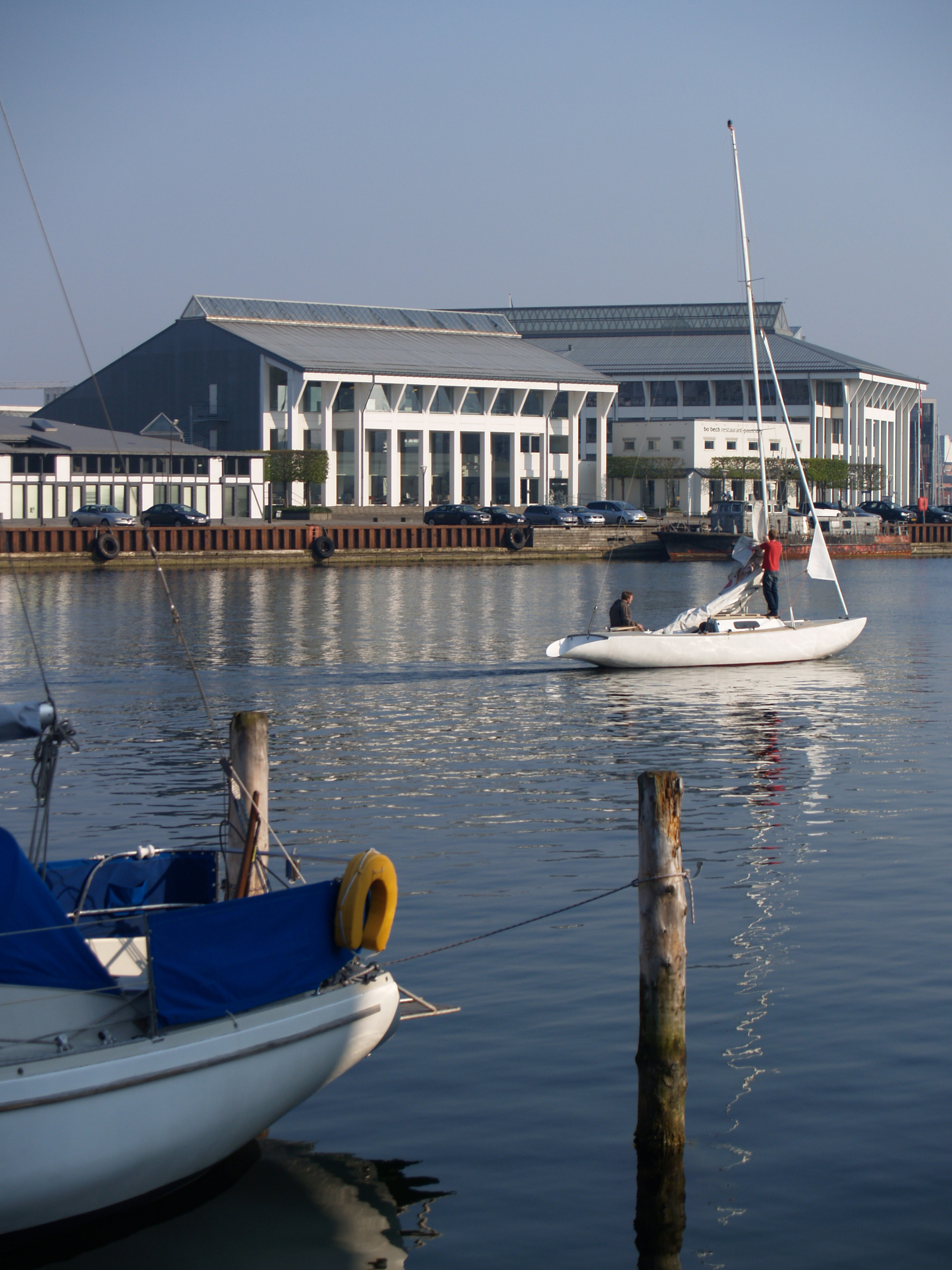
Temple-like effect on the waterfront

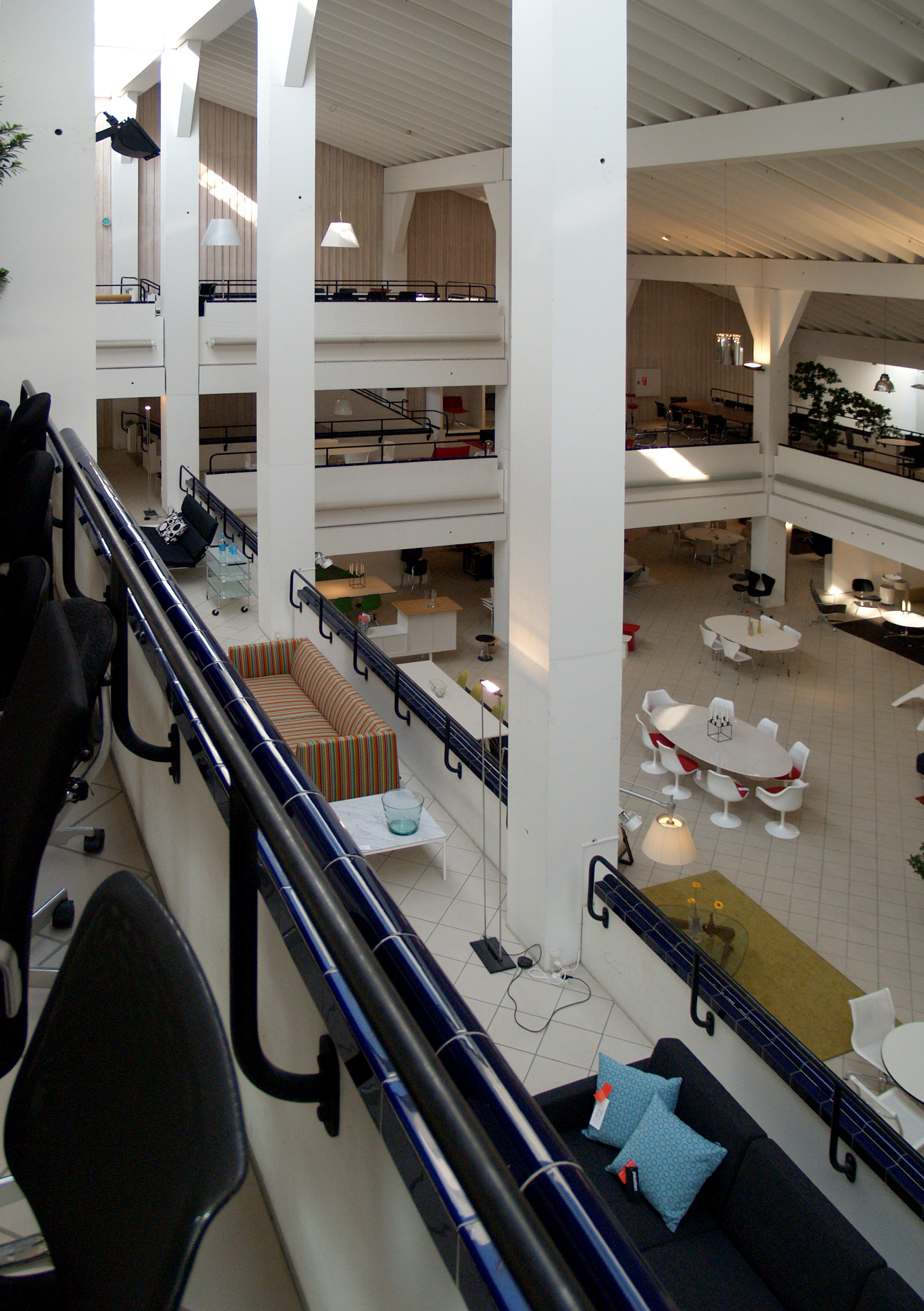
Interior
