= Architecture studio =

Architecture studio is a class in an undergraduate or graduate professional architecture program (such as a Bachelor of Architecture or Master of Architecture program) in which students receive hands-on instruction in architectural design. Typically, architecture studio classes include distinctive educational techniques, such as "desk crits" (project critiques delivered at a student's desk) and "juries", meetings of the students with more than one tutors around the production of students for a multi-layered open discussion where all students are supposed to participate.

Typically, it is equipped with drafting tables, pin-up boards, and a smart board.
