= Esbjerg Performing Arts Centre =

Concert hall and theatre in Esbjerg, Denmark

Coordinates: 55°27′51″N 8°27′07″E

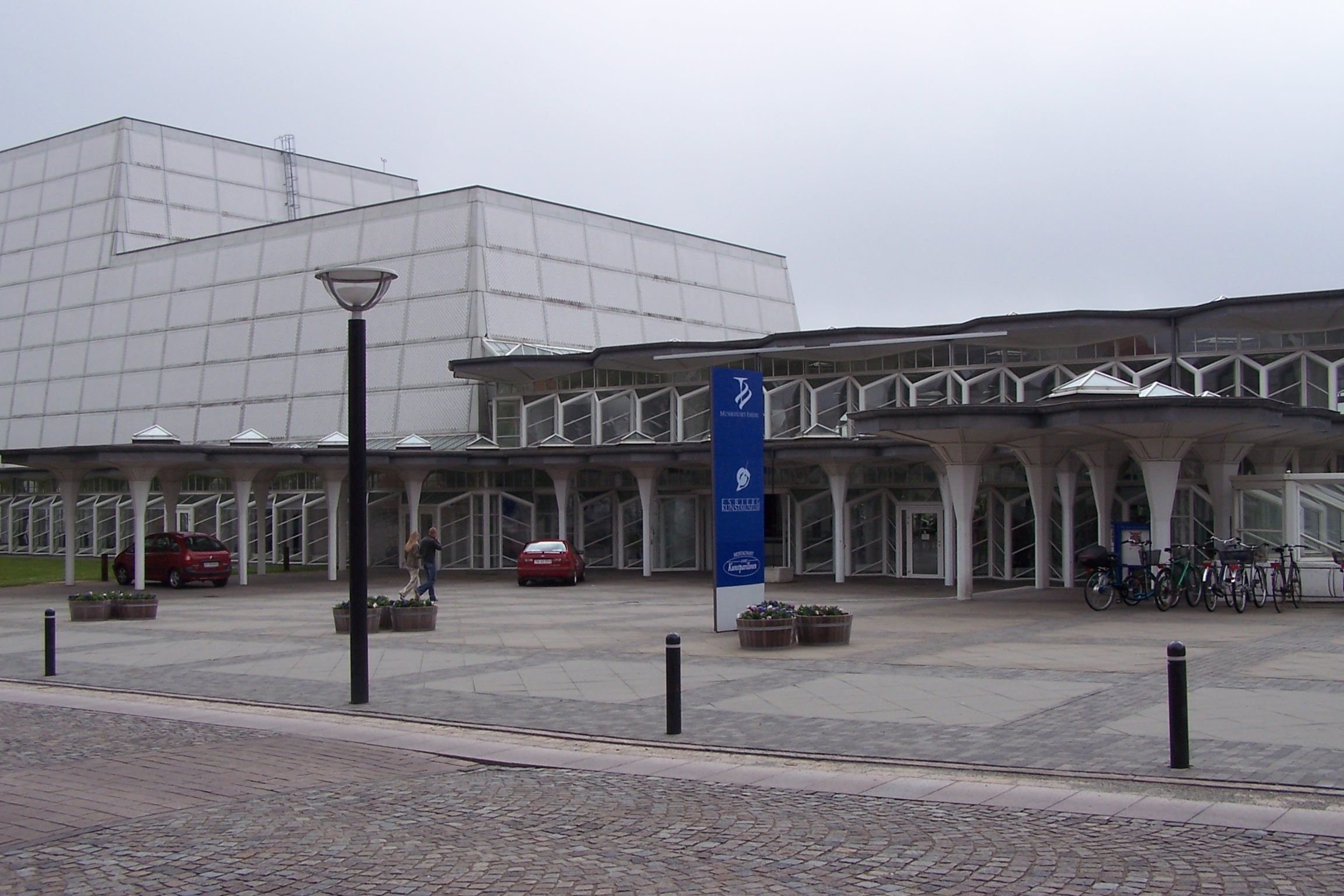
Esbjerg's Performing Arts Centre

The Esbjerg Performing Arts Centre (Danish: Musikhuset Esbjerg) is a concert hall with theatrical facilities in the centre of Esbjerg in southwest Jutland, Denmark. Completed in 1997 to designs by the Utzons, it forms part of a complex which also contains the Esbjerg Art Museum. Its two auditoriums host classical concerts and drama productions.

== Architecture ==
Designed by Jan Utzon in close collaboration with his father Jørn Utzon, the building is located in Esbjerg's City Park next to the Art Museum where it overlooks the harbour and the sea beyond. It nevertheless lacks the usual sophistication of the Utzons, no doubt as Esbjerg Municipality wanted to save on construction costs. Clad with white ceramic tiles, it takes the form of a truncated pyramid housing the main hall which is attached to a spacious foyer with octagonal pillars resembling mushrooms. The foyer provides access to the theatre and concert hall on one side and to the cafeteria and art museum on the other.

With seating for over 1,100, the main auditorium is designed for classical music with a ceiling that can be lowered in accordance with the required acoustical level. For theatrical performances with a lowered ceiling, it seats 850. The size of the stage—up to 400 m^{2} (4,300 sq ft)—and the positioning of the orchestra pit can also be adjusted. The smaller hall which is suitable for chamber music or children's theatre has seating for 233. The building also contains a lecture theatre and meeting rooms.

== Productions ==
The Esbjerg Ensemble performs chamber music concerts while opera is produced by Den Nye Opera, which is based in Esbjerg. The annual programme also includes musicals, family shows, revues, lectures and drama.

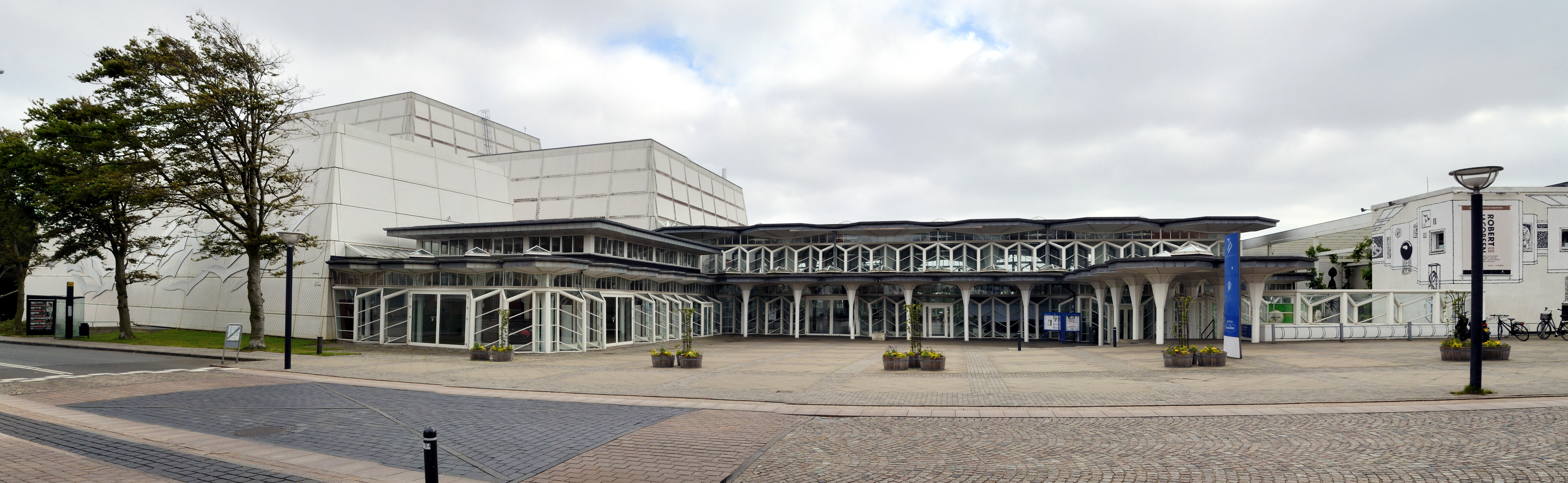
