= Jan Utzon =

Danish architect (born 1944)

Jan Utzon (born 1944) is a Danish architect. The son of Jørn Utzon, with whom he worked closely on several prestigious projects, he has completed a number of fine works of his own including the Performing Arts Centre in Esbjerg.

== Early life ==
Born on 27 September 1944 in Stockholm, Utzon was brought up first at Hellebæk near Helsingør in the north of Zealand until the family moved to Australia in 1957. He studied at the School of Architecture in Sydney (1964–66) and at the Royal Danish Academy of Fine Arts in Copenhagen (1966–1970).

== Career ==
Deeply influenced by his father's approach to architecture, Jan Utzon soon began to collaborate with him taking on key supervisory tasks in major projects such as the Kuwait National Assembly Building. In many cases, it is difficult to estimate to division of responsibility in projects undertaken by Utzon Associates where Jan worked both with his father and his brother Kim. These include the Paustian House in Copenhagen and the Skagen Odde Nature Centre in the north of Jutland. Jan also set up his own design office on Funen where he authored many interesting projects. One of his most successful is the Performing Arts Centre in Esbjerg (1997) with its theatre and concert hall combined with the earlier art museum. Its large communal foyer catering both to the concert hall and the museum is particularly appealing and was achieved on a modest budget.

Utzon Architects and Johnson Pilton Walker, Architects in collaboration, have explored options to improve the existing Opera Theatre at the Sydney Opera House.

Utzon has also been active in the developing countries. Working for Tvind, he built the headquarters for the Humana People to People organisation in Shamva, Zimbabwe, as well as a large training and conference centre at San Juan de las Pulgas near Ensenada in Mexico's Baja California (2008).

National Assembly of Kuwait in collaboration with Jørn Utzon

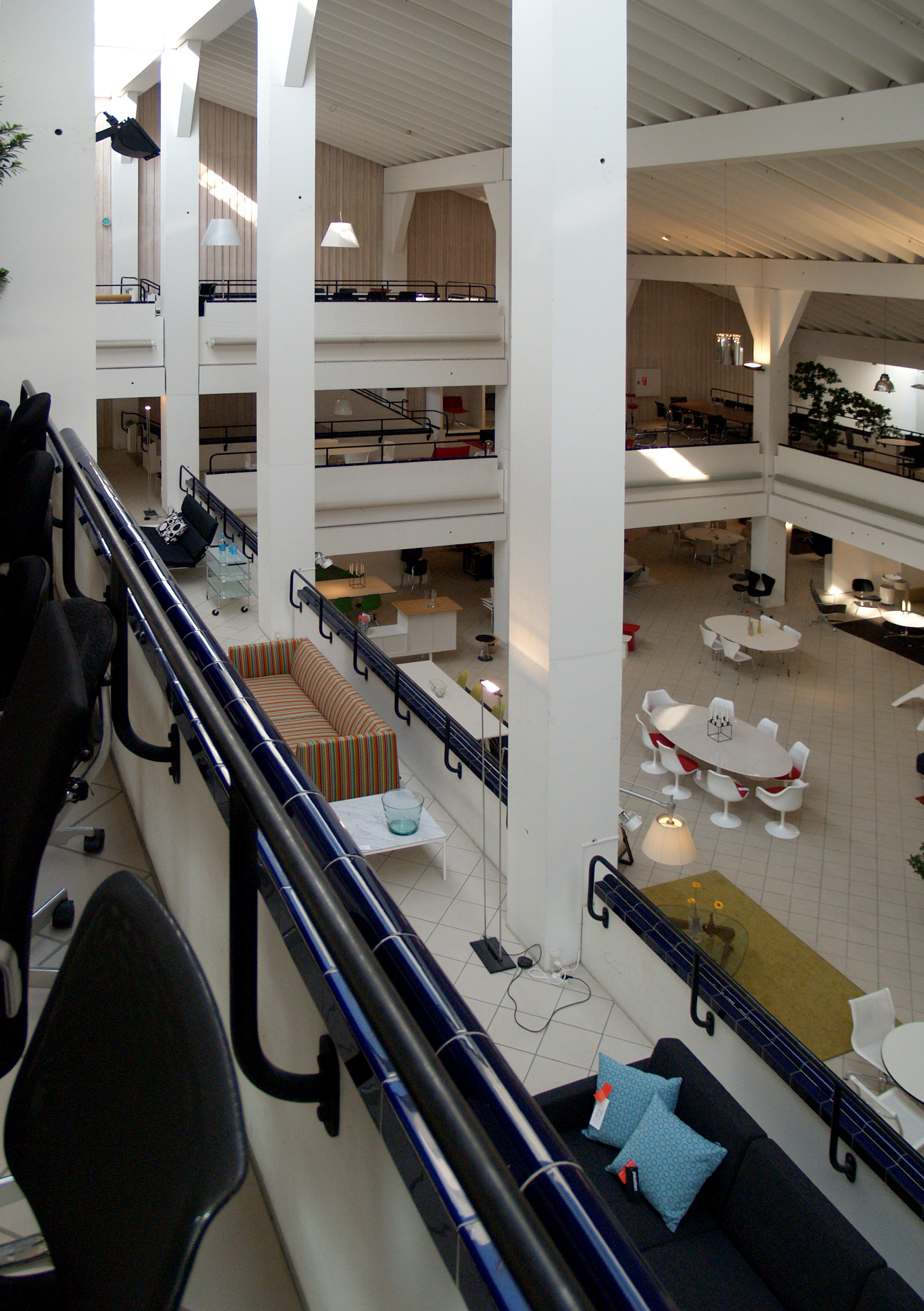
Paustian House, Copenhagen, in collaboration with Jørn Utzon and Kim Utzon

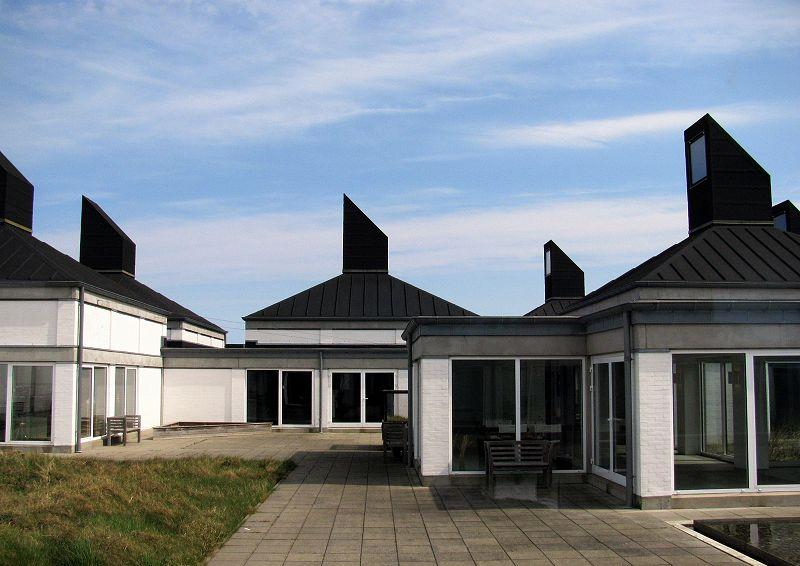
Skagen Odde Nature Centre, North Jutland, in collaboration with Jørn Utzon
