= Kim Utzon =

Danish architect

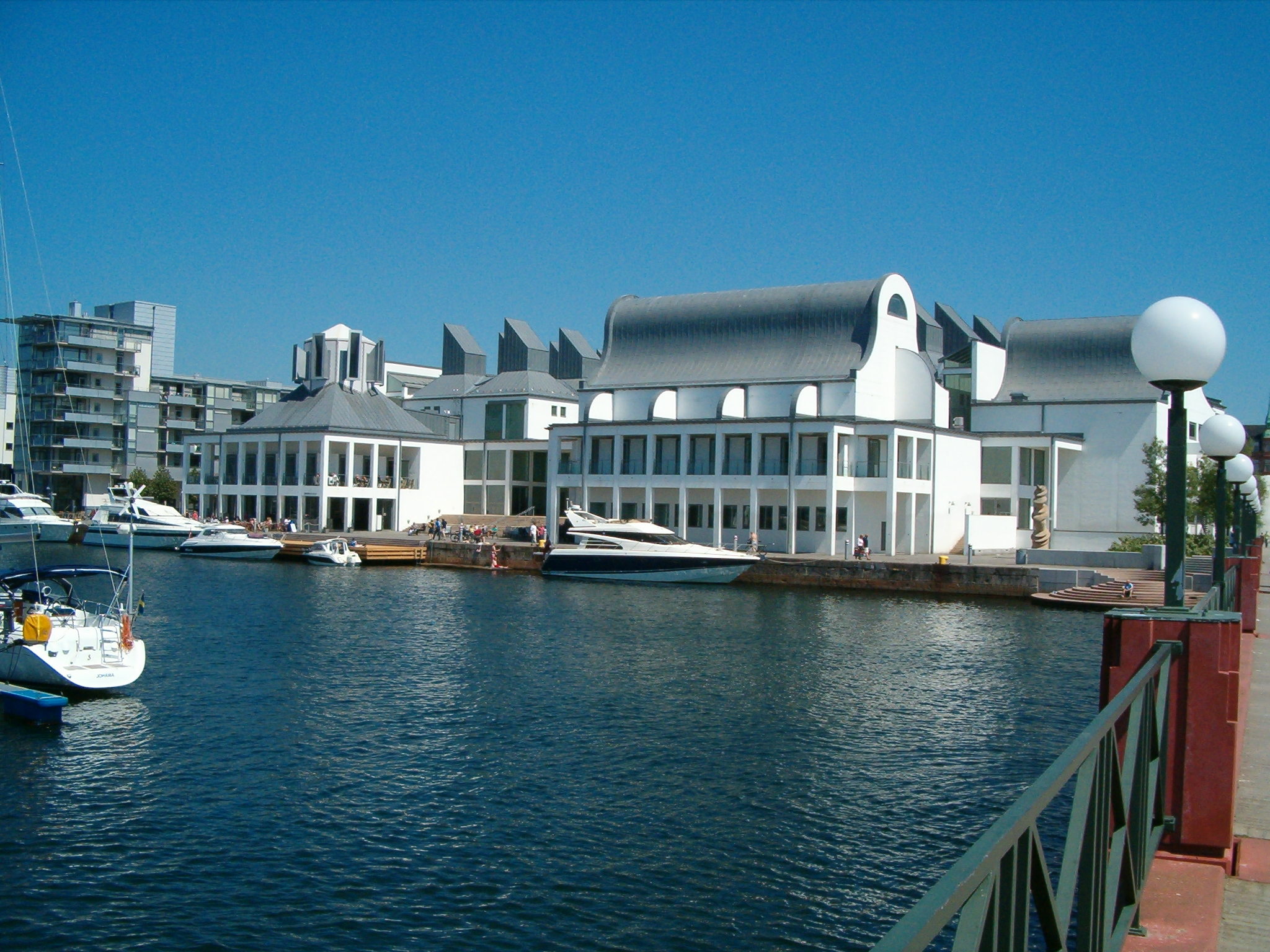
The Henry Dunker Culture Centre in Helsingborg, Sweden

Kim Utzon (born 1957) is a Danish architect, and son of Jørn Utzon.

== Biography ==
Kim Utzon was born in 1957 as the son of Pritzker Prize-winning Danish architect Jørn Utzon. He studied architecture at the Royal Danish Academy of Fine Arts from 1976 to 1981. From 1986 he was part of Utzon Architects. He has collaborated with his father on several projects, including the Paustian furniture store in Copenhagen.

== Selected buildings ==
- Paustian House, Copenhagen, Denmark (1987) - with Jørn Utzon
- Henry Dunker Culture Centre, Helsingborg, Sweden (2002)
- Rosendahl Headquarters, Hørsholm, Denmark (2003)
- Harbour House I, Copenhagen, Denmark (2004)
- Bryggens Have residences, Islands Brygge, Copenhagen, Denmark (2004–06)
- Vejle Art Museum extension, Vejle, Denmark (2006)
- Utzon Center, Aalborg, Denmark (2008) - with Jørn Utzon
- Bikuben Kollegiet, Aalborg, Denmark (2009)
- Harbour House II, Copenhagen, Denmark (2010)
- Tivoli Congress Centre, Copenhagen, Denmark (2010)
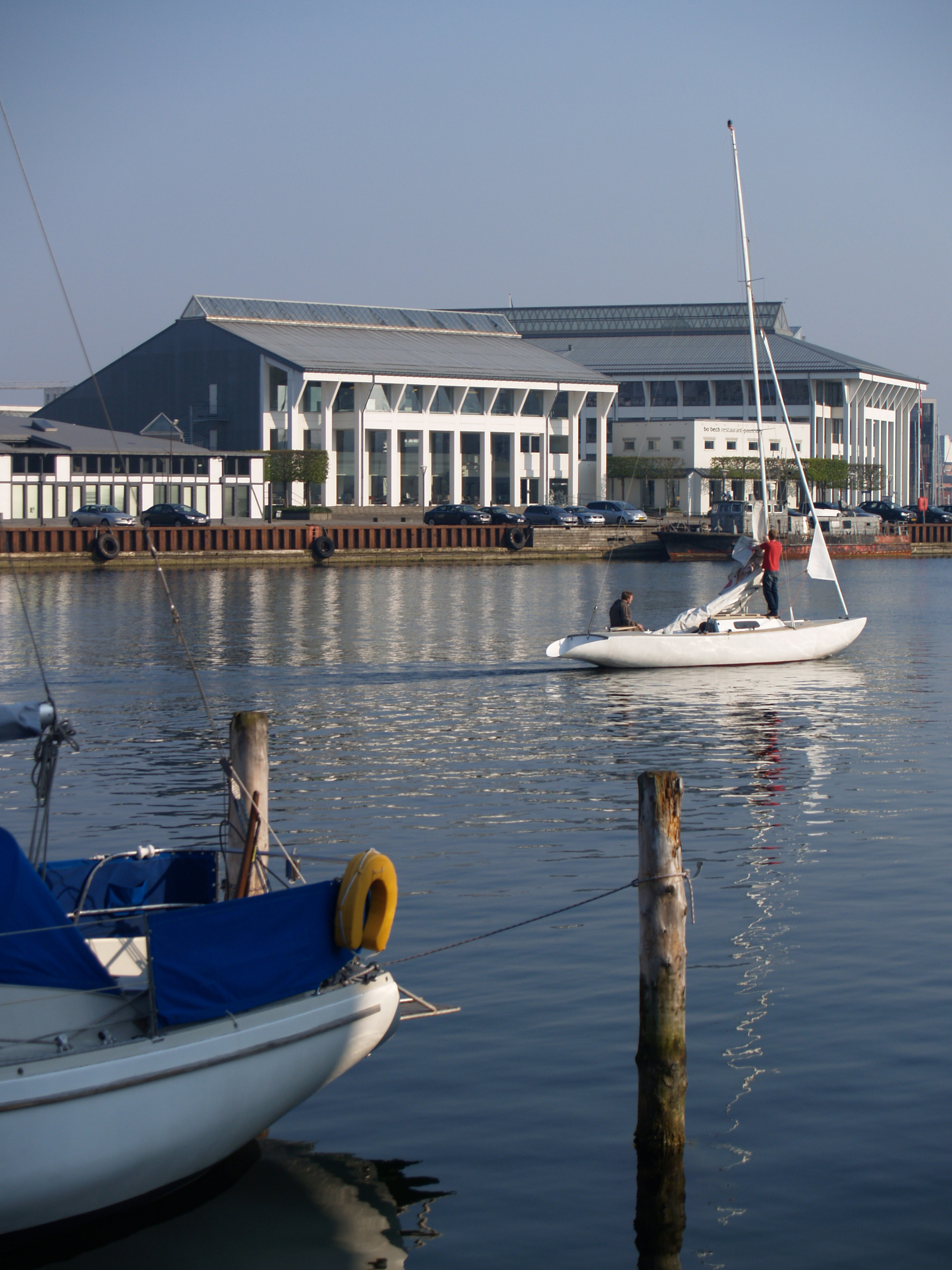
Paustian House in Copenhagen (1987)

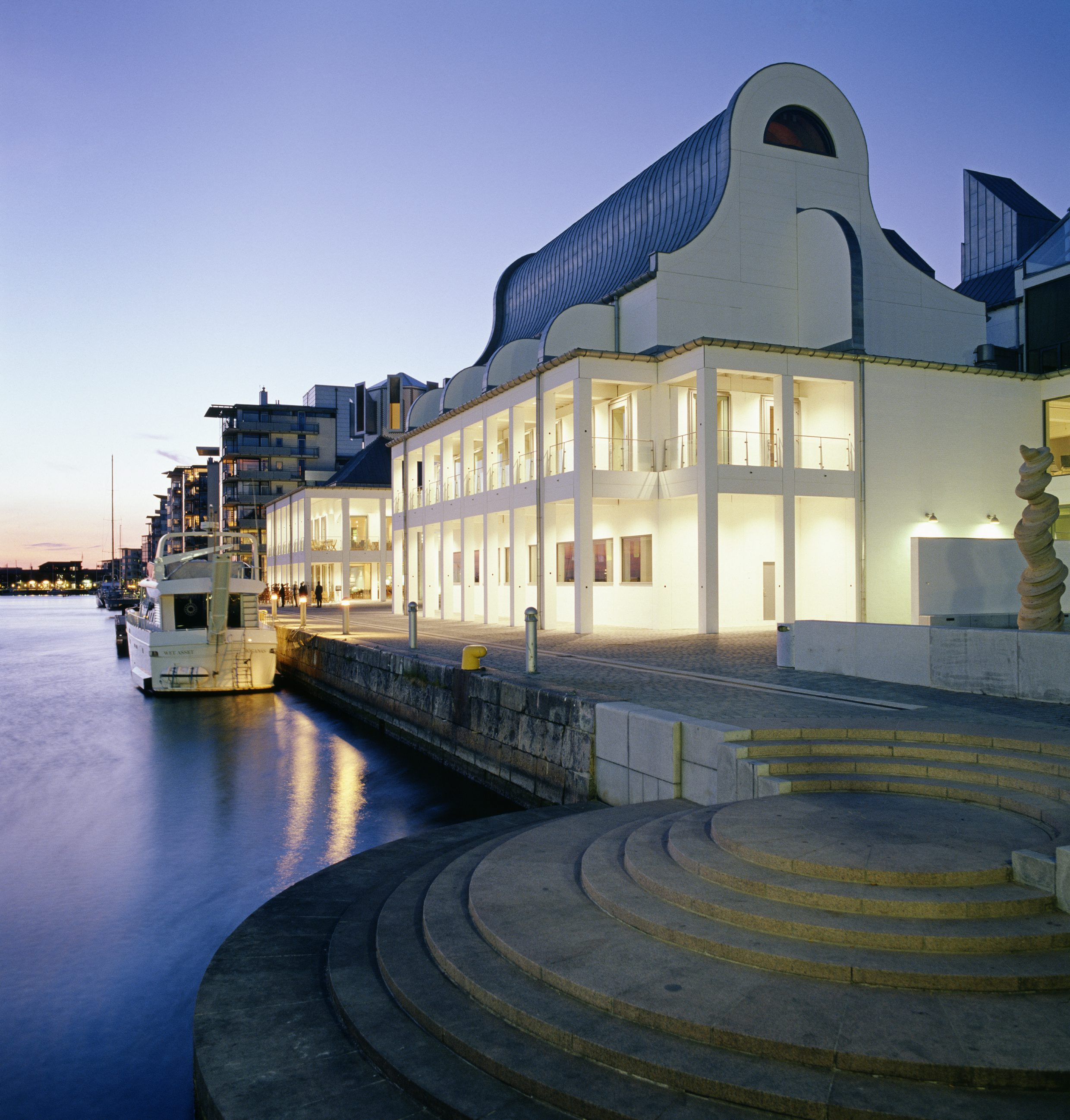
Dunkers kulturhus, Helsingborg, Sweden

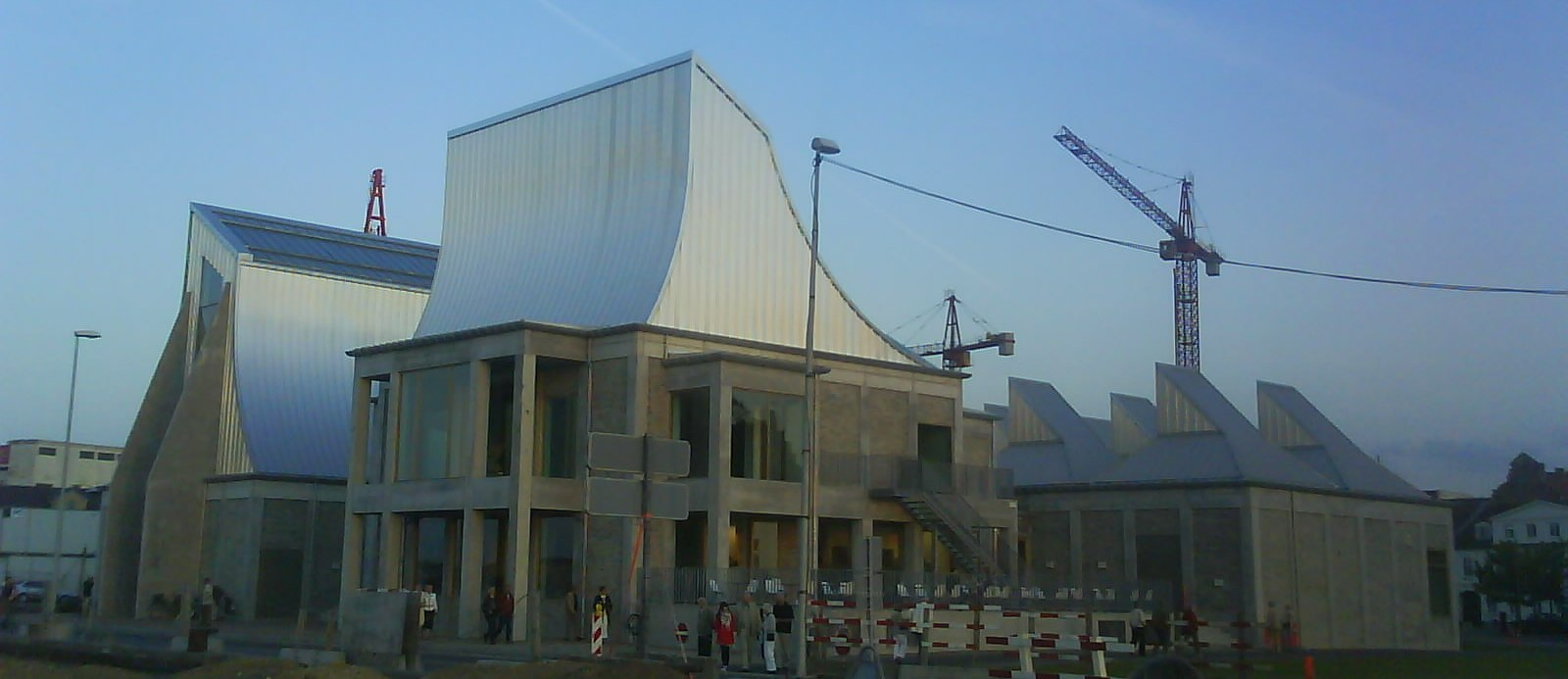
Utzon Centre, Aalborg, Denmark

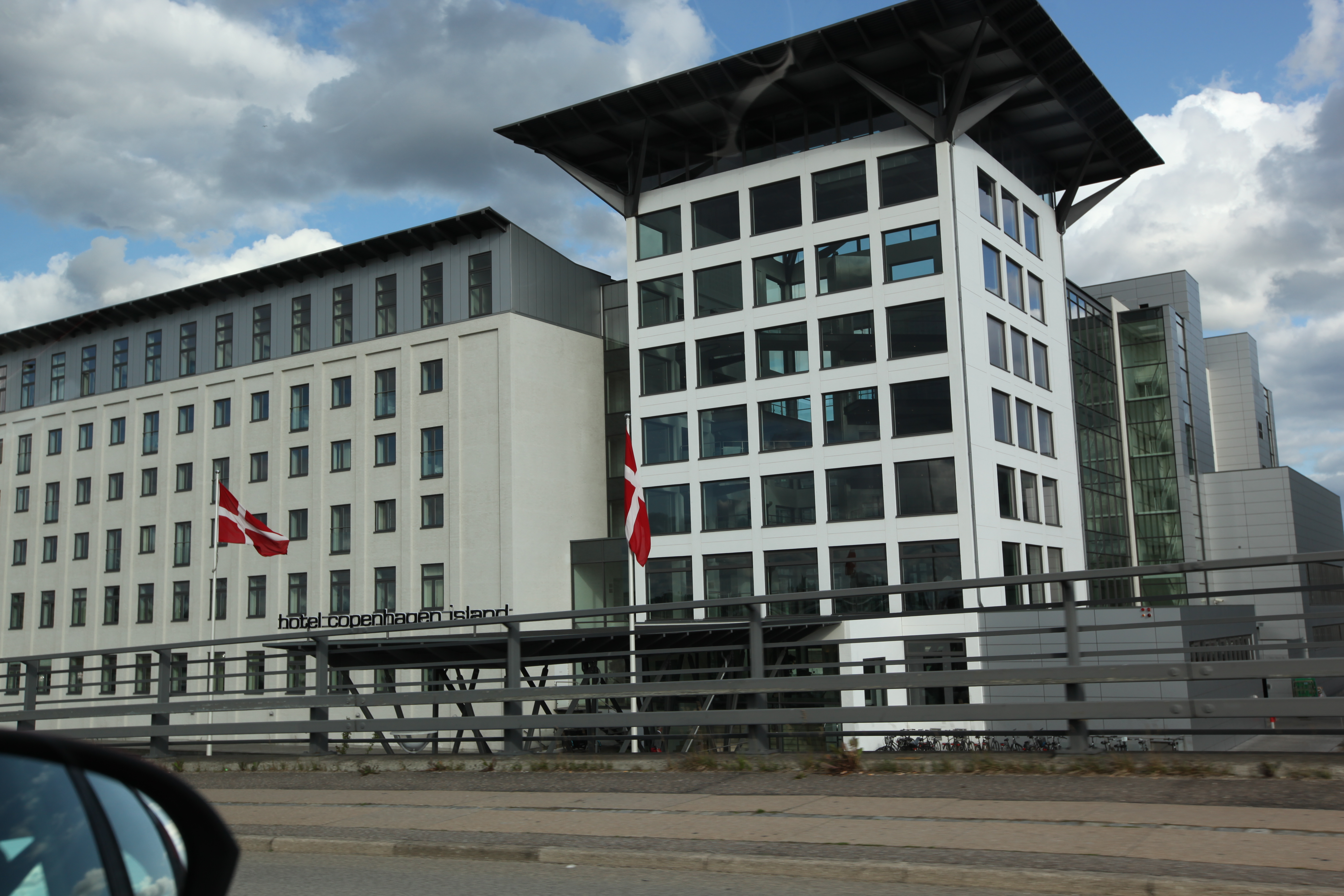
Copenhagen Island Hotel

== Awards ==
- 2001 Eckersberg Medal

== See also ==
- Architecture of Denmark
