= Ci shrine =

Chinese shrine for people

Chinese name
- Chinese: 祠
Transcriptions
Standard Mandarin
- Hanyu Pinyin: Ci

Korean name
- Hangul: 사
- Hanja: sa

Japanese name
- Kana: じ/し/ほこら
Transcriptions
- Romanization: Ji/shi/hokora

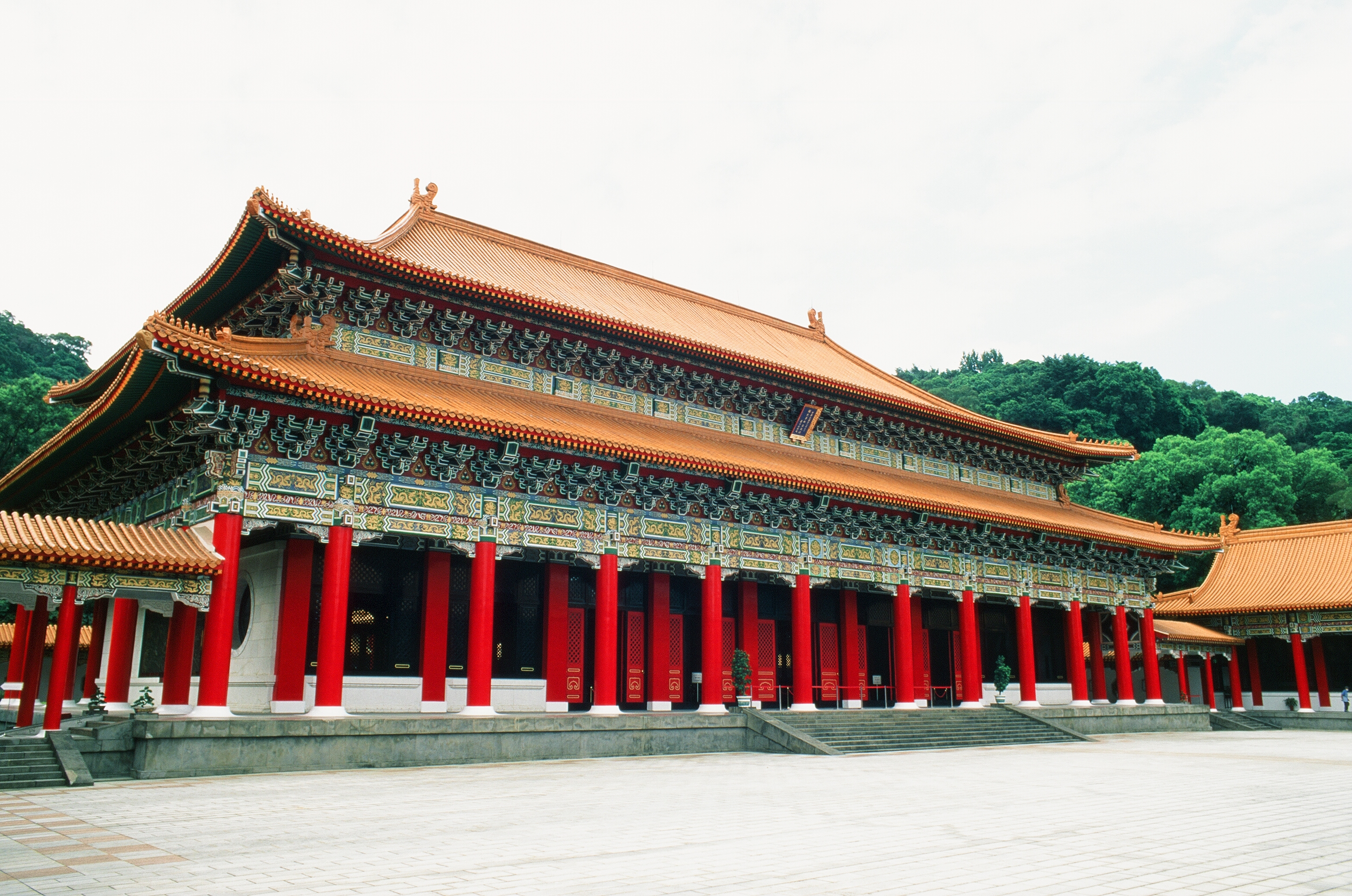
Taipei Yuanshan Loyalty Shrine

The character 祠

A ci shrine (祠) is a semi-religious facility that originated in China and was widely used in the East Asian cultural sphere for traditional folk beliefs, mainly for the worship, sacrifice, deity, ancestor, or sage or martyr, in the form of a temple-style building.

They are a kind of Chinese temple architecture and contrast with Miao shrines which enshrine deities instead of ancestors.

They are sometimes called 祠廟; Cimiao which is a combination of its name and that of the Miao shrine.

Ancestral shrines were often built by the public for the common worship and dedication of widely revered figures, and in some cases living figures were also dedicated. For example, in Ming dynasty, the people of Teng County built a shrine to the life of Zhao Bangqing, who was a clean official in the area and was about to leave for his post in the capital, and "yellow children, white men and old men, worshiped him". Hero shrines were built to honor the spirit of loyalty and righteousness and to memorialize the martyrs who died for the country. The memorial shrine in Taiwan was built by the Republic of China government after World War II. In addition, there is also the Chinese hero cult, which is dedicated to heroes.

Since ci and miao are similar in nature, some ci established to commemorate sages are also considered by the faithful to be used for praying for good fortune and avoiding evil, and the objects worshipped are also regarded as deities, so they are sometimes mixed. Some places dedicated to Confucianism, Daoism, Buddhism, or gods and saints of folk beliefs are also named as ci, such as Wong Tai Sin Temple.

The ancestral shrine dedicated to ancestors contains this character.

Ancestral shrines in the Korean Peninsula were introduced from China during the Three Kingdoms, and gradually became popular during the Goryeo Dynasty and flourished during the Joseon Dynasty, but are now less common.

== Ancestral shrines ==
Ancestral shrines have two names, both with the character cí (祠) in them:

- Chinese: 祠堂; pinyin: Cítáng has its first character as ci
- Chinese: 宗祠; pinyin: Zōng Cí has its first character derived from Jongmyo, and its second character is ci

== See also ==
- Jisi
- Ancestral shrine
- Jongmyo (shrine)
- Miao Shrine
- Hokora
