= Additive Architecture =

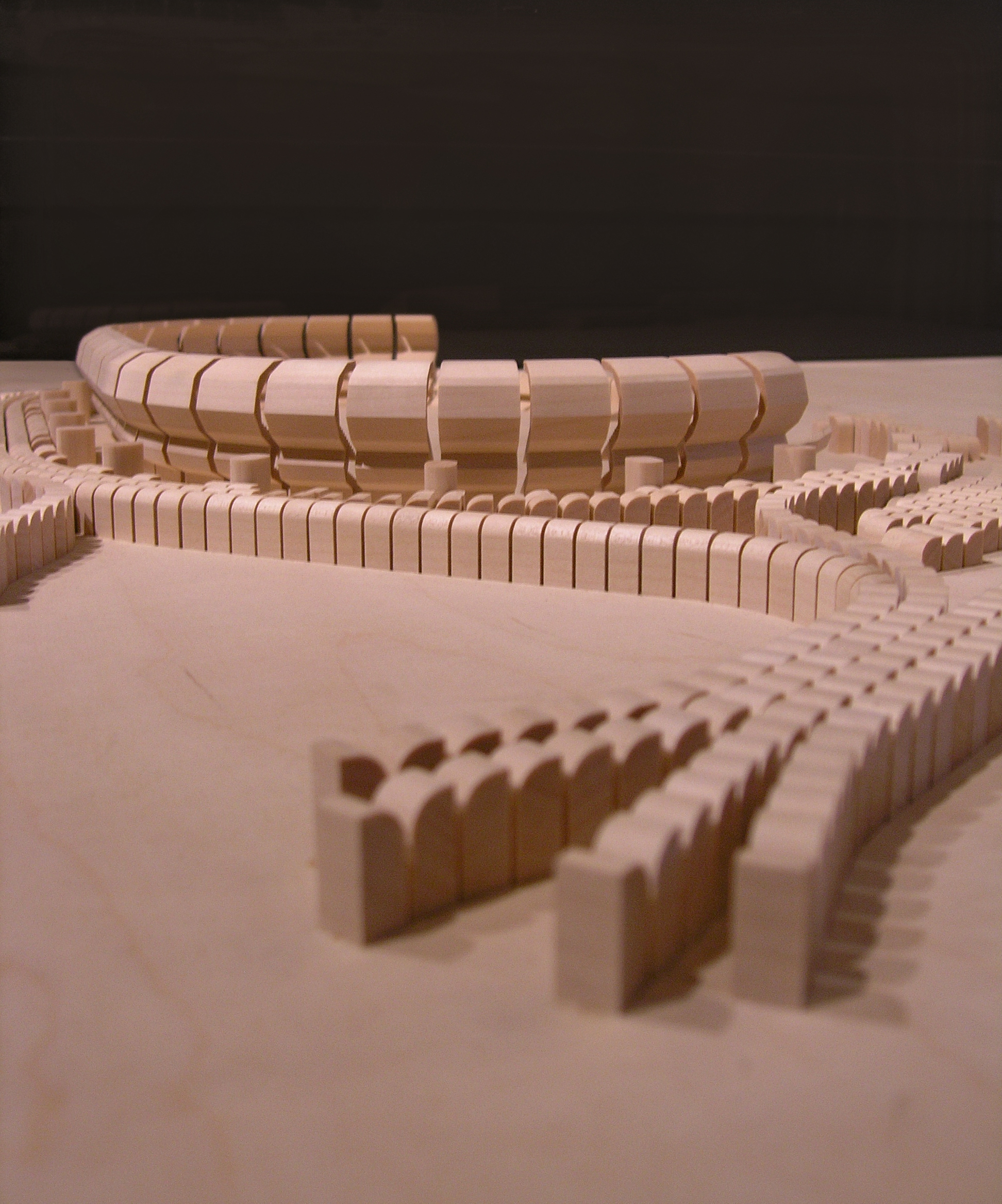
Utzon's model for a Jeddah sports stadium (1967)

Additive Architecture is an approach used by Danish architect Jørn Utzon to describe his development of architectural projects on the basis of growth patterns in nature.

Mogens Prip-Buus, one of Utzon's closest colleagues, reports that the term was coined in 1965 in Utzon's Sydney office when, after a discussion of the social structures in Britain and Denmark, Utzon suddenly jumped up and wrote "Additive Architecture" on the wall. He saw it as part of an additive world where both natural and cultural forms contributed to additive systems and hierarchies. He realized that his own architecture reflected the same principle, just as the transitions in primitive societies between family, village and the surrounding world have visible links revealing differences, relations and distances.

Utzon observed the additive approach in Chinese temples whose stacked timber structures are basically identical, differing only with the size of the building. In his "Additive Architecture" manifesto in 1970, he tells us how he saw the phenomenon reflected in a group of deer at the edge of a forest or in the pebbles on a beach, convincing him that buildings should be designed more freely rather than in identical box shapes. Earlier, in 1948, he had expressed the same ideas in an essay titled "The Innermost Being of Architecture" stating: "Something of the naturalness found in the growth principle in nature ought to be a fundamental idea in works of architecture."

The application of the additive approach can be seen in many of Utzon's works including the courtyard housing schemes which began with the Kingo Houses, the tiling of the Sydney Opera House and his designs for a sports complex in Jeddah. Utzon's early competition project for a crematorium in 1945 also exemplifies his approach. The building's free-standing walls could be extended over time, a new brick being added for each cremation.

Examples of the Additive Architecture approach in Utzon's work can also be seen in his designs for the unbuilt Silkeborg Museum, the Farum Town Centre proposal, the Herning expansion plan including a "school town" and the flexible Espansiva approach for low-cost housing which only resulted in a prototype. Perhaps the best example of all is the proposal for a major sports centre in Jeddah, Saudi Arabia, based on the use of a limited number of repeating elements.

== Literature ==
- Jørn Utzon, Additive Architecture: Logbook Vol. V, Copenhagen, Edition Bløndal, 2009, 312 pages. ISBN 87-91567-23-8
- Richard Weston: Utzon — Inspiration, Vision, Architecture. Denmark: Edition Bløndal, 2002. ISBN 87-88978-98-2
