= Fenxiang =

Chinese folk religion term

Fenxiang (分香), literally the incense division, (Note: Otherwise known as fenling 分灵, "efficacy division". Note that xiang 香 not only refers to incense and its fragrance, ash and smoke, but also metaphorically to the "suchness", "thusness" or "spiritual essence" of things.) is a term that defines both hierarchical networks of temples dedicated to a particular Deity or Deities in Chinese folk religion, and the ritual process by which these networks form.

== Networks ==
Networks of affiliated temples dedicated to the cult of a specific God or Deity can proliferate extensively. These networks are economic and social bodies, and in certain moments of history have even taken military functions. They also represent routes of pilgrimage, with communities of devotees from the affiliated temples going up in the hierarchy to the senior temple. One notable example will Baishatun Mazu Pilgrimage in Taiwan.

== Ritual of creation of a new temple ==
When a new temple dedicated to the same Deity is founded, it enters the sacred network through the ritual of division of incense. This consists in filling the incense burner of the new temple with ashes brought from the incense burner of an existing temple. The new temple is therefore spiritually affiliated to the older existing temple, and back in the hierarchy to the first temple dedicated to the Deity.

== See also ==
- Jingxiang, incense worship
- Miaohui, temple gathering

== Sources ==
- Shahar, Meir; Weller, Robert Paul (1996), Unruly Gods: Divinity and Society in China, University of Hawaii Press, ISBN 0190258144
