= Jingxiang =

Ritual of offering incense accompanied by tea and/or fruits

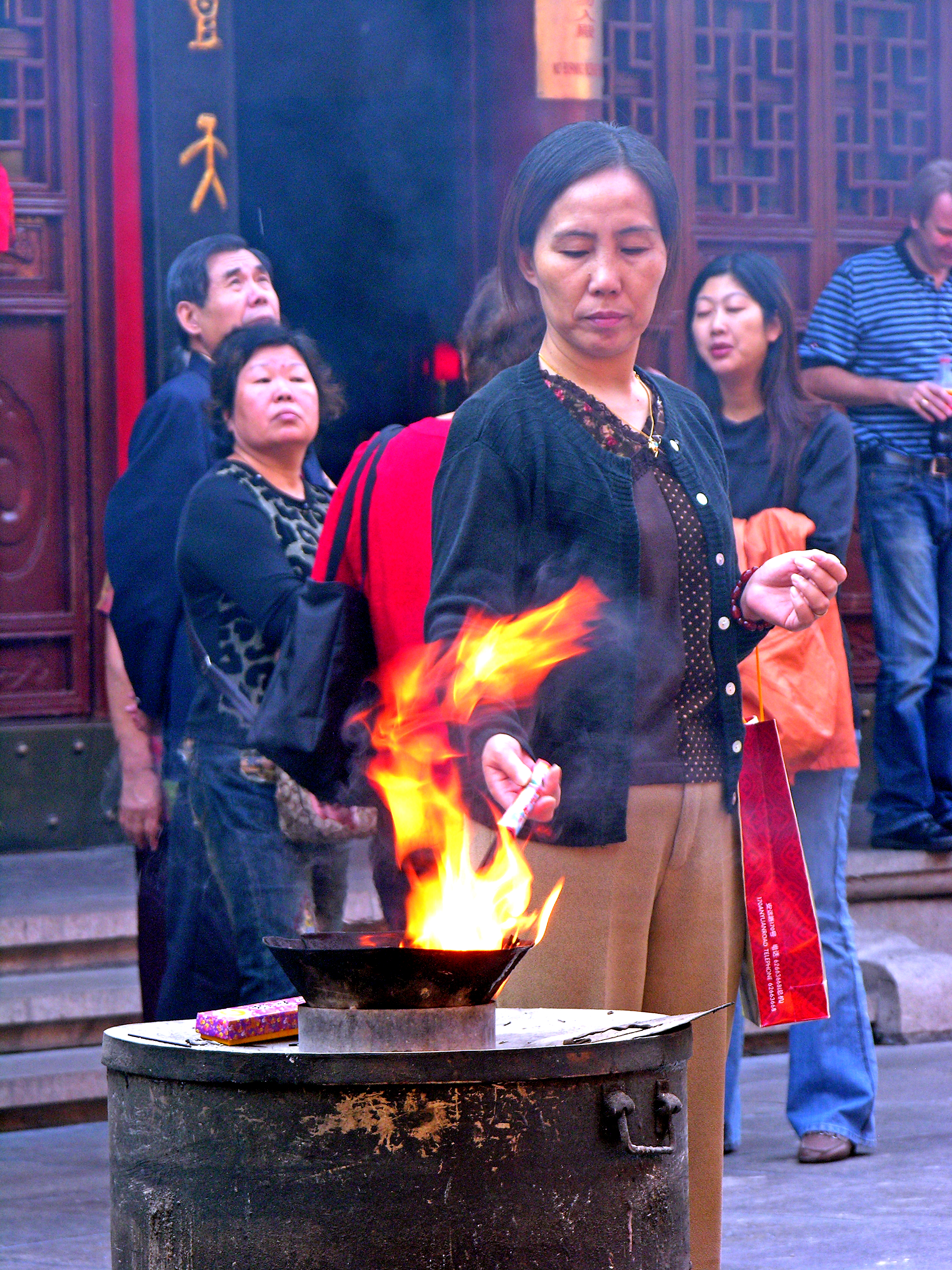
Woman kindling the incense sticks for jingxiang at a temple in China.

Jìngxiāng (Chinese: 敬香; trans. "offering incense with respect"), shàngxiāng (上香; "offering incense"), bàishén (拜神; "worshipping the Gods"), is a ritual of offering incense accompanied by tea and or fruits in Chinese traditional religion. In ancestral religious worship it is called jìngzǔ (敬祖; "veneration of the ancestor") or bàizǔ (拜祖; "worship of the ancestor"). It is observed by a devotee holding joss incense with both hands in front of an altar during the worship. For greater reverence or devotion, the devotee will kneel and bow before the altar during and after placing the incense inside the urn at the altar.

Jiangxiang is practiced in diffused Chinese folk religion and also by adherents belonging to the schools of Taoism, Chinese Buddhism and Confucianism. It is highly essential when conducting general prayer to one of the Deities, paying respect to a deceased ancestor as part of the daily devotions in Chinese ancestor veneration, or celebrating the Qingming Festival, Zhong Yuan Festival and Chongyang Festival.

== Number and meanings of incense ==
The number of joss stick varies, usually three or five, or less commonly, nine. The ancient Chinese consider that even numbers are associated with yin, and odd numbers are associated with yang. Because yang represents positive and auspicious things, odd numbers like three, five and nine are preferred in many rituals.

== Sandalwood joss ==
The scent of the joss sticks is believed to calm the human spirit and good for health because the key ingredients of joss sticks are made up of various herbs. The same effect is believed to affect the spirit of a deceased ancestor. In this connection it also serves as a prayer to the deity that an adherent is worshipping. It is also considered a form of spiritual nourishment to the spirits in Taoism and Chinese folk religion.

== Other offerings ==
Usually jingxiang is done with an offering of Chinese tea, in a number corresponding to the gods, typically three cups. Fruits and various offerings are generally presented when conducting Jingxiang, however the specification differs for different temples or deities.

== See also ==
- Chinese folk religion
- Chinese ancestral worship
- Chinese Buddhism
- Chinese ritual mastery traditions
- Taoism
- Chinese temples
- Ancestral shrine & Ancestral tablets
- Fenxiang (分香)
- Fulu (符籙)
- Jiaobei (筊杯)
- Kau Cim (求籤)
- Miaohui (廟會)
- Zhizha (紙紮)
