= Miao shrine =

Type of East Asian temple

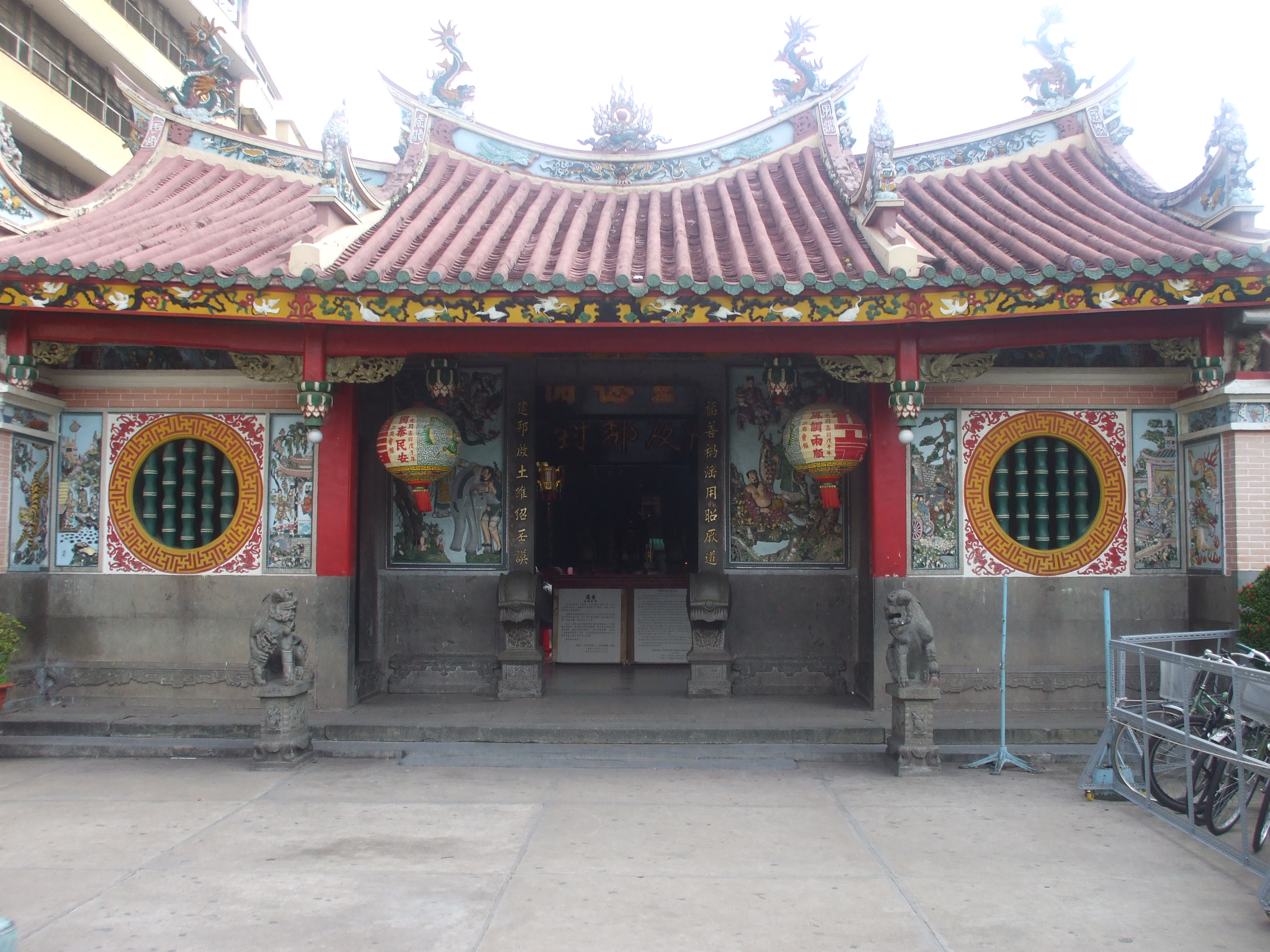
Nhi Phu Miao - Ho Chi Minh City

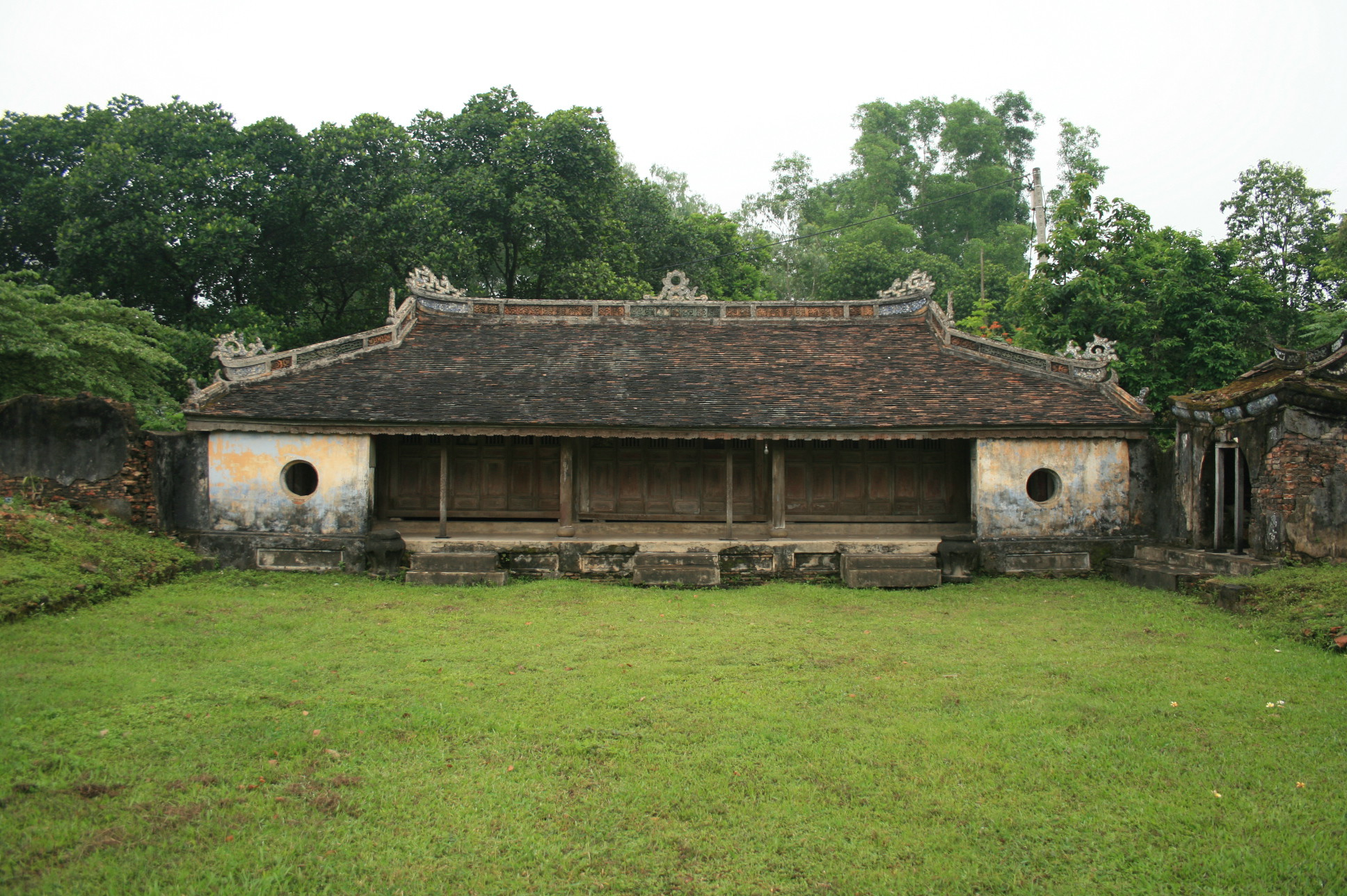
Miao of Long Chau-Thua Thien Hue province

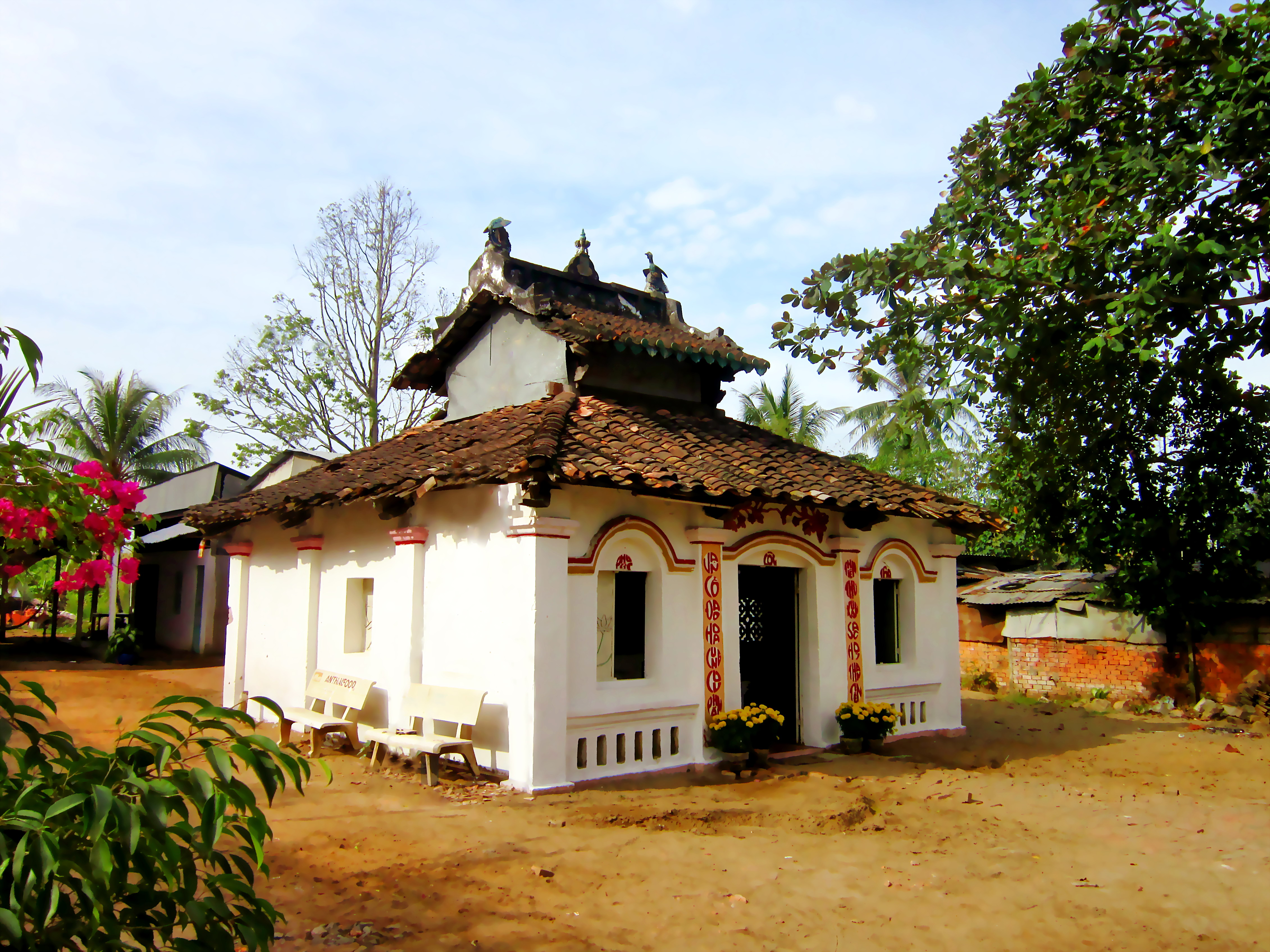
Miao in Cái Răng district

Miao (simplified Chinese: 庙; traditional Chinese: 廟) are buildings in traditional East Asian religions enshrining gods, myths or legends, sages of past dynasties, and famous historical figures. They are a kind of Chinese temple architecture and contrast with Ci shrines which enshrine ancestors and people instead of deities.

The word temple is translated into Chinese as Shenmiao (神庙; 神廟; 'God-Miao').

== In China ==
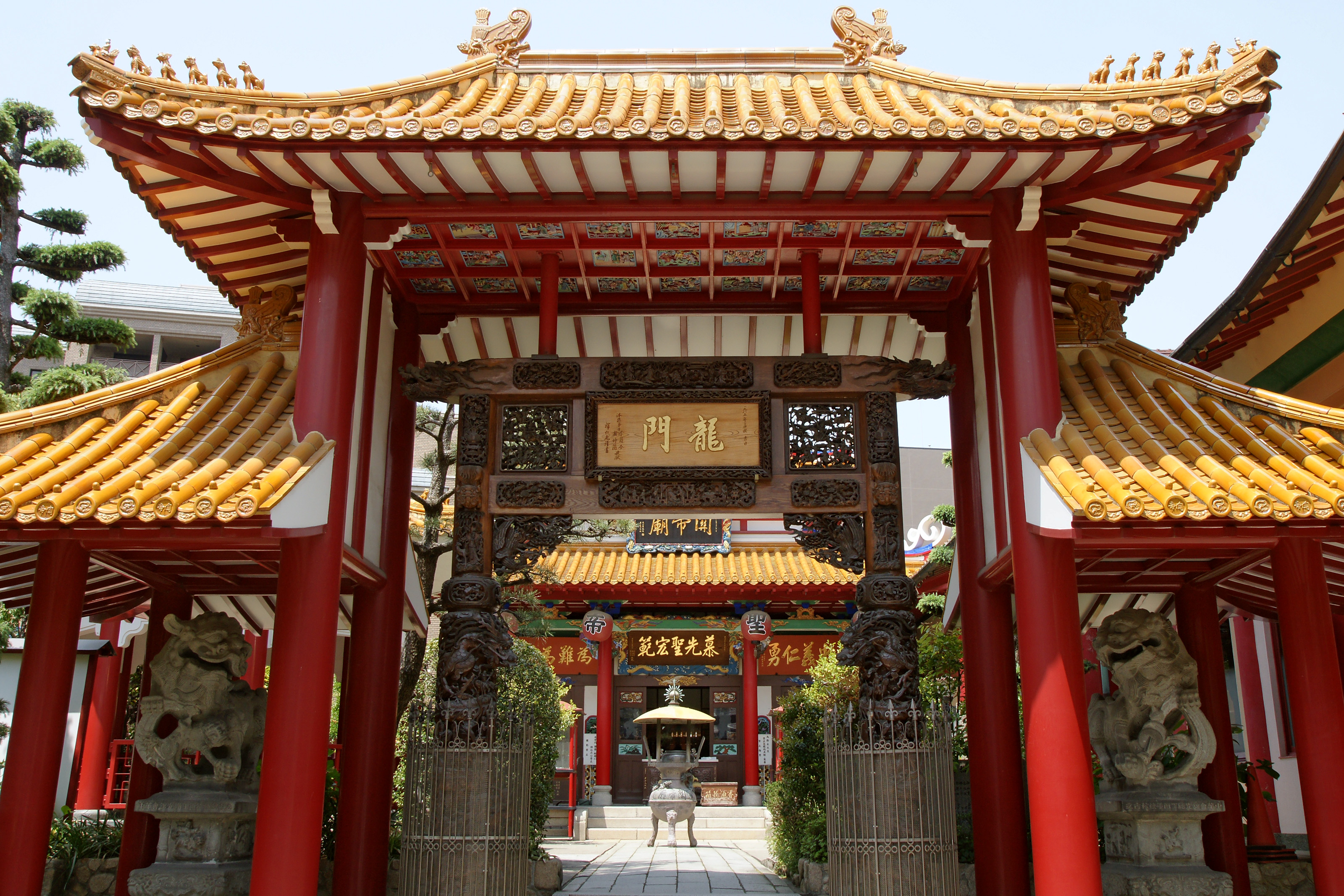
Sekitei Miao (Kobe, Japan)

In China, a Miao is a place where ancestral spirits are enshrined, while a cemetery exists separately. Therefore, it is positioned like a Buddhism, but unlike a Buddhist altar, it is not located in the main building, but in a separate building dedicated to the Miao. In China, where ancestors are revered with great respect, the Miao has been the most important place in the house since ancient times. In addition to ancestral spirits, people sometimes build Miaos to enshrine heroes and ancient deities that they respect and worship, as in the case of Confucius and Guan Yu, which are enshrined in many Miaos throughout China.

As a result of the three teachings (Confucianism, Taoism, and Buddhism), some Miaos enshrine deities and sages, and are collectively referred to as "Miaos".

=== Confucianism ===
There are Miaos dedicated to Confucius and other Confucian deities in places such as academies. Famous examples are the Kongmyo, known as a World Heritage Site, and the Yushima Cathedral attached to the Shoheizaka Academy in Tokyo.

The word Temple of Confucius is Kongmiao in Chinese, reflecting their status as Miao rather than Ci Shrines

=== Taoism ===
There are City God Miao dedicated to City Gods and Tudigong Miaos dedicated to Tudigongs, Guan Yu Miao dedicated to Guan Yu, Yue Fei Miao dedicated to Yue Fei, etc. in various places.

== In Japan ==
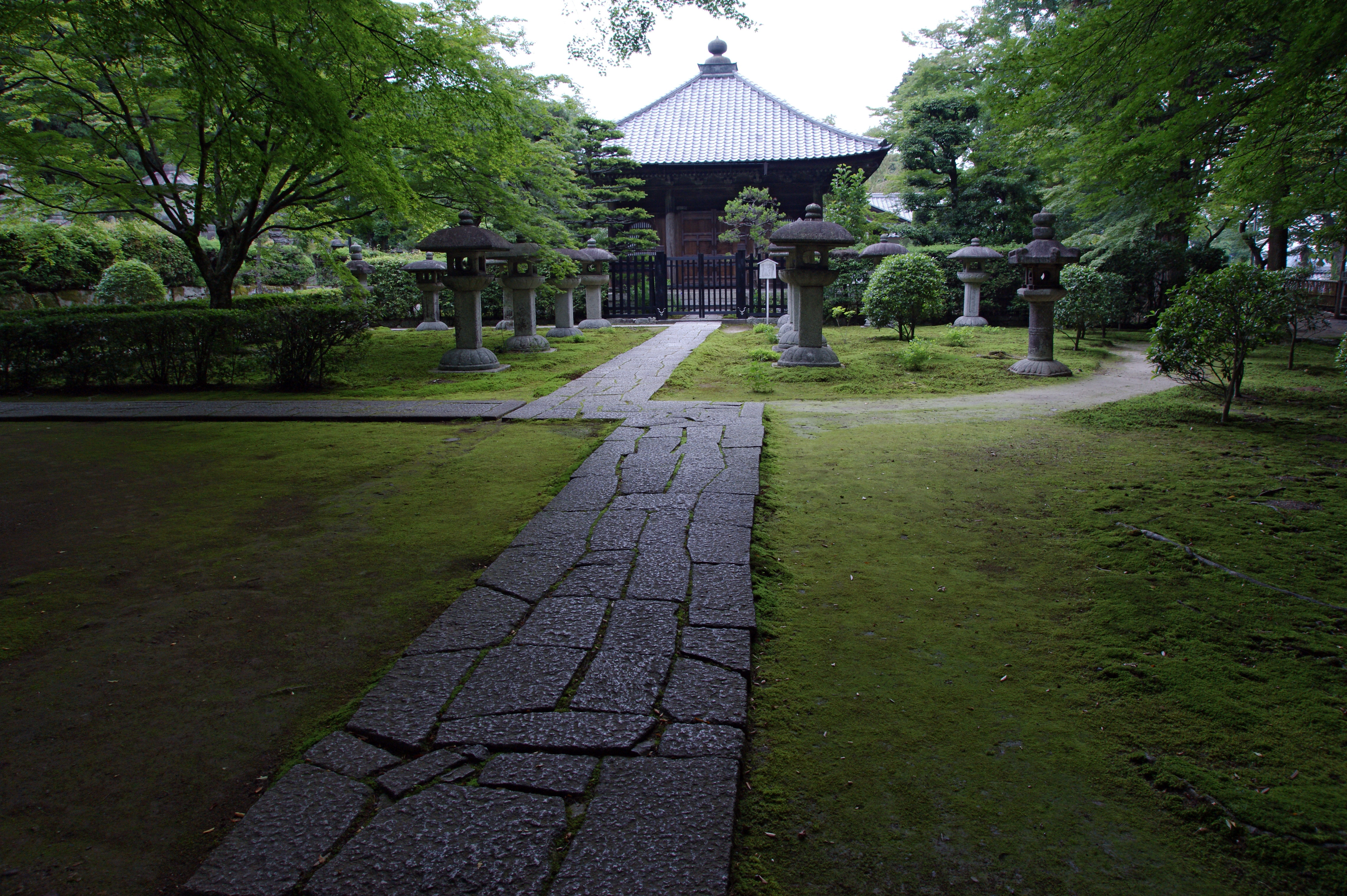
Jigandō

=== Overview ===
In Japan, a building dedicated to a specific person is called a Reibyo (霊廟), Byo (廟), or Tamaya (霊屋).

=== Shinto Shiki ===
Shinto shrines are mainly enshrined in the same way as ordinary Shinto shrines. The Engishiki Jinmeicho lists the shrine as "Oobihimebyo Shrine" (one of the head shrines of the current Usa Jingu), while the Engishiki Shikibu-shiki section lists "Kashihimyo" (now Kashii Shrine), which is not listed in the Jinmeicho.、It is said that in some cases they were distinguished from shrines.

== In Vietnam ==
In Vietnam Miao are called Vietnamese: Miếu. In Vietnamese custom it is said that: Every village worshiping gods must have a Miao. In some places, there is both a Miao and a communal house. The Miếu is the place where ghosts and spirits are dressed, the communal house is the place to worship the City God and to serve as an office for people to gather. Miaos are often built in scenic places, especially on high mounds, or near large lakes and rivers.

Miếu have highly diverse architectural styles in Vietnam.

== See also ==
- Ancestral shrine
- Chinese temple architecture
- Ci Shrine
- Confucian royal ancestral shrine
- Shinto shrine
- Sorei
- Taoist temple
- Veneration of the dead
