= Wong Tai Sin Temple =

Wong Tai Sin Temple may refer to:

- Wong Tai Sin Temple (Hong Kong), a shrine and tourist attraction in Hong Kong
- Wong Tai Sin Temple (Guangzhou), a temple in Guangzhou, Guangdong province, China
- Wong Dai Sin Temple (Markham), a Taoist temple in Ontario, Canada
