= Ancestral shrine =

Temples dedicated to deified ancestors in Chinese culture

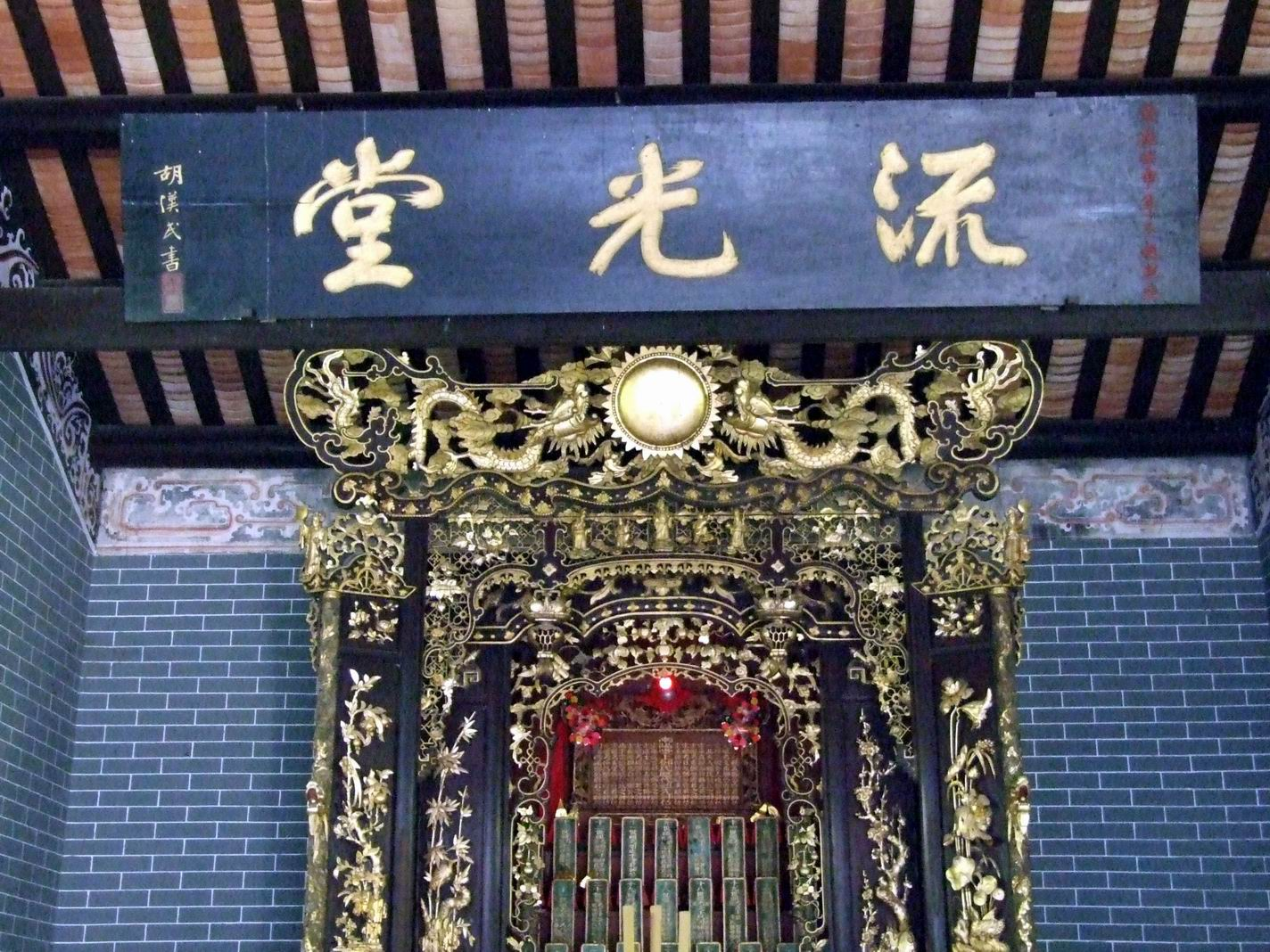
Altar with ancestral tablets in King Law Ka Shuk, Hong Kong.

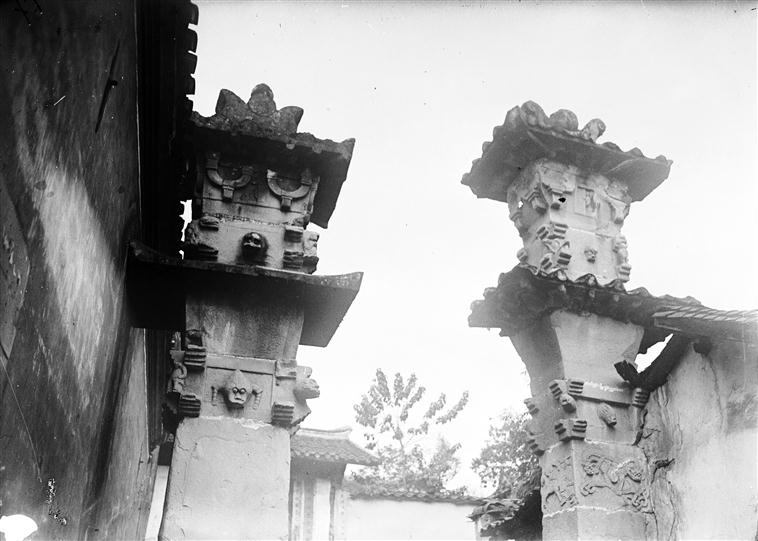
Eastern Han (25–220 AD) Chinese stone-carved que pillar gates of Dingfang, Zhong County, Chongqing that once belonged to a temple dedicated to the Warring States era general Ba Manzi

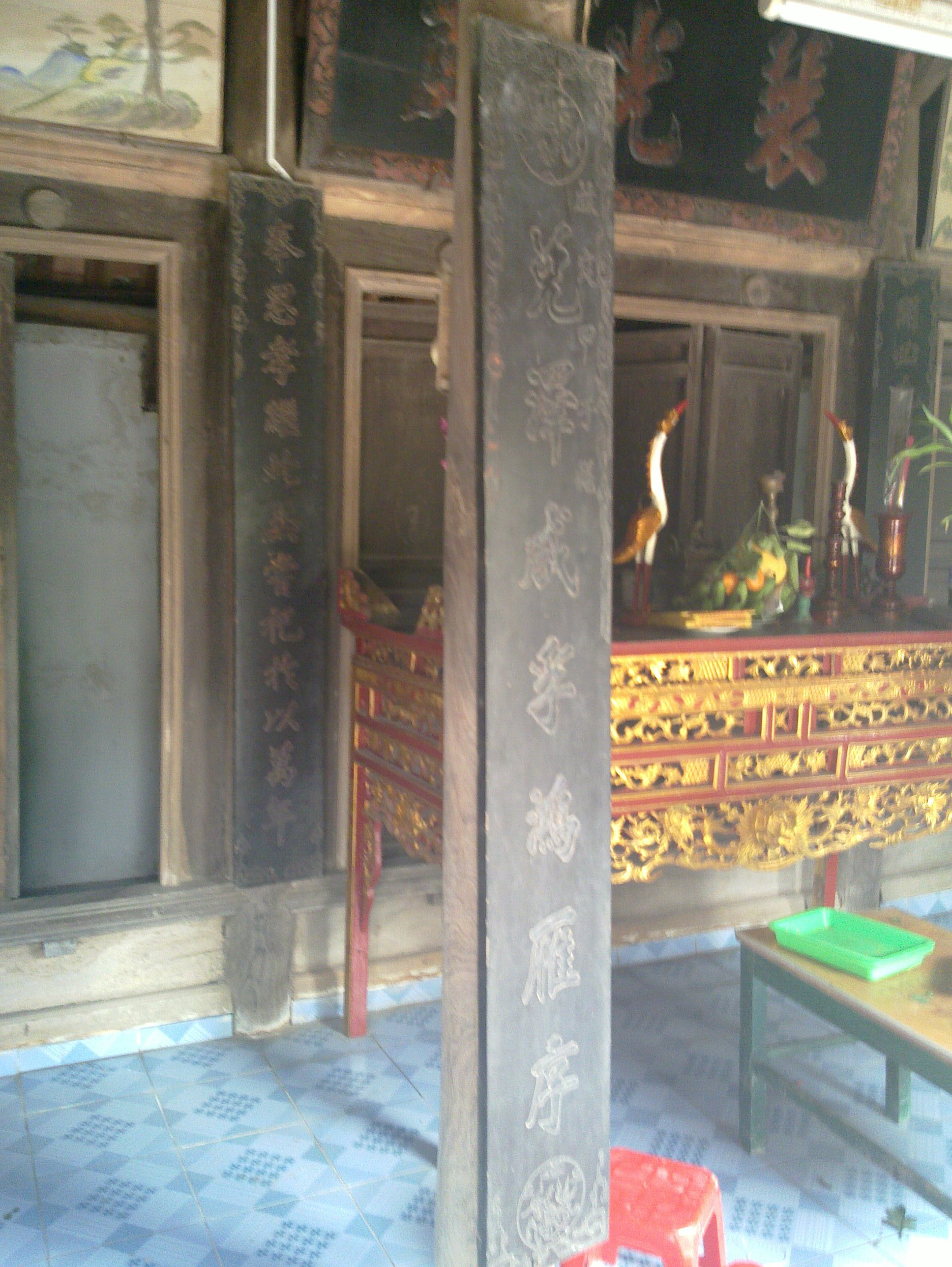
Altar with couplets and diaphragm in a Vietnamese clan ancestral house (Nhà thờ họ)

An ancestral shrine, hall or temple (Chinese: 祠堂; pinyin: Cítáng; Pe̍h-ōe-jī: Sû-tông or Chinese: 宗祠; pinyin: Zōng Cí; Pe̍h-ōe-jī: Chong-sû, Vietnamese: Nhà thờ họ; Chữ Hán: 家祠户; Korean: 사당; Hanja: 祠堂), also called lineage temple, is a temple dedicated to deified ancestors and progenitors of surname lineages or families in the Chinese tradition. Ancestral temples are closely linked to Confucian philosophy and culture and the emphasis that it places on filial piety.

A common central feature of the ancestral temples are the ancestral tablets that embody the ancestral spirits. The ancestral tablets are typically arranged by seniority of the ancestors. Altars and other ritual objects such as incense burners are also common fixtures. Ancestors and gods can also be represented by statues.

The temples are used for collective rituals and festivals in honor of the ancestors but also for other family- and community-related functions such as weddings and funerals. Sometimes, they serve wider community functions such as meetings and local elections.

In traditional weddings, the ancestral temple serves a major symbolic function, completing the transfer of a woman to her husband's family. During the wedding rites, the bride and groom worship at the groom's ancestral shrine, bowing as follows:

1. first bow - Heaven and Earth
2. second bow - ancestors
3. third bow - parents
4. fourth bow - spouse

Three months after the marriage, the wife undertakes worship at the husband's ancestral shrine, in a rite known as miaojian (廟見).

In mainland China, ancestral temples along with other temples have often been destroyed or forced to become "secularized" as village schools or granaries during the land reform of the 1950s and the Cultural Revolution. They have experienced a revival since the reform and opening up of the 1980s. The revival of the ancestral temples has been particularly strong in southern China where lineage organization had stronger roots in the local culture and local communities are more likely to have clan members living overseas who are keen to support the revival and rebuilding of the shrines through donations.

== Etymology ==
Ancestral shrine

Chinese name
- Chinese: 祠堂
Transcriptions
Standard Mandarin
- Hanyu Pinyin: Citang

Korean name
- Hangul: 사당
- Hanja: 祠堂
Transcriptions
- Revised Romanization: sadang

Japanese name
- Kana: しどう
Transcriptions
- Romanization: Shidō

Chinese: 祠堂; pinyin: Cítáng has its first character Ci Shrine in

Chinese: 宗祠; pinyin: Zōng Cí has its first character derived from Jongmyo, and its second character is Ci Shrine

Ancestral shrine

Chinese name
- Chinese: 宗祠
Transcriptions
Standard Mandarin
- Hanyu Pinyin: Zongci

Korean name
- Hanja: 종사
Transcriptions
- Revised Romanization: Jongsa

Japanese name
- Hiragana: そうし
Transcriptions
- Romanization: sōshi

That phrasing can be seen as making the Jongmyo a more sacralized version, since Ci shrines are considered lower ranked than Miao shrines.

== Taiwan ==
Notable ancestral temples in Taiwan include:

- Koxinga Ancestral Shrine (鄭成功祖廟), in West Central District, Tainan
- Liu Clan Shrine (劉家宗祠), in Liouying District, Tainan
- Yang Family Ancestral Hall (楊氏宗祠), in Jiadong Township, Pingtung County
- Wukou Village Liou Family Ancestral Hall (五溝水劉氏宗祠), in Wanluan Township, Pingtung County
- Zhong-Sheng-Gong Memorial (宗聖公祠), in Pingtung City, Pingtung County
- Shetou Doushan Temple (社頭斗山祠), in Shetou Township, Changhua County
- Chen Dexing Ancestral Hall (陳德星堂), in Datong District, Taipei

== Hong Kong ==
Notable ancestral temples in Hong Kong include:

- Tang Ancestral Hall and Yu Kiu Ancestral Hall, along the Ping Shan Heritage Trail
- King Law Ka Shuk
- Tang Chung Ling Ancestral Hall

== Southeast Asia ==
Notable ancestral temples in Chinese communities of Southeast Asia include:

- Long Shan Tang Temple (Chinese: 龍山堂), in Yangon, Myanmar
- Khoo Kongsi, in Penang, Malaysia
- Eng Chuan Tong Tan Kongsi, in Penang, Malaysia
- Tan Si Chong Su, in Singapore

== Vietnam ==
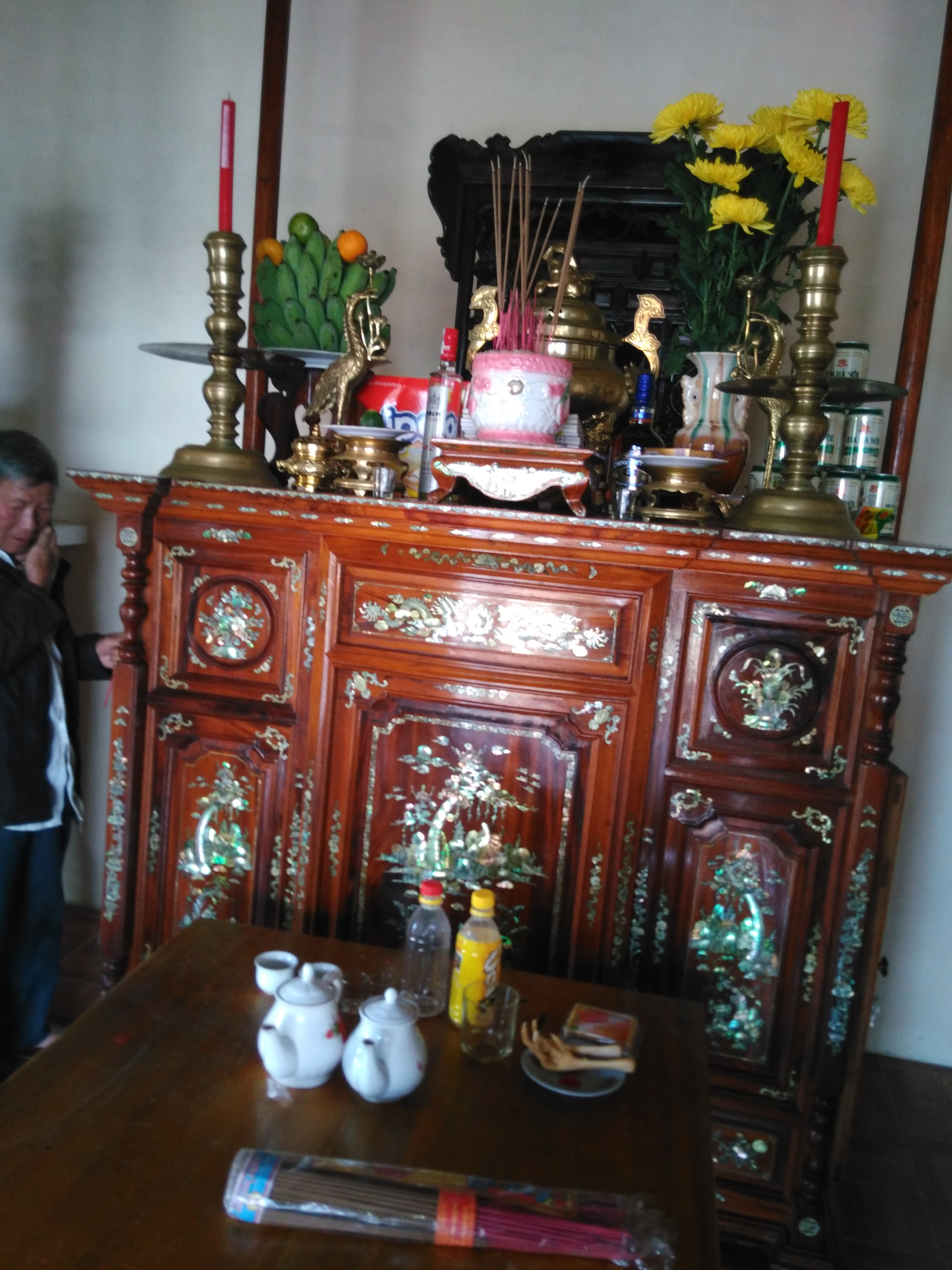
Altar in the nhà thờ họ of the Trần family in Cát Sơn

Ancestral temples are called nhà thờ họ, nhà thờ tộc or từ đường in Vietnam. An ancestral death anniversary will be held yearly at nhà thờ họ and this anniversary is usually used as an occasion to renew the relationship between clan members.

== In other religions and cultures ==
Ancestral shrines or similar concepts are also common in other religions and cultures. Especially other East and Southeast Asian but also traditional African religions have ancestral shrines and or tombs. Ancestor worship is an important and common element in native African religions and is still common and practiced by followers of folk religions but also Christian and Muslim Africans.

== Gallery ==
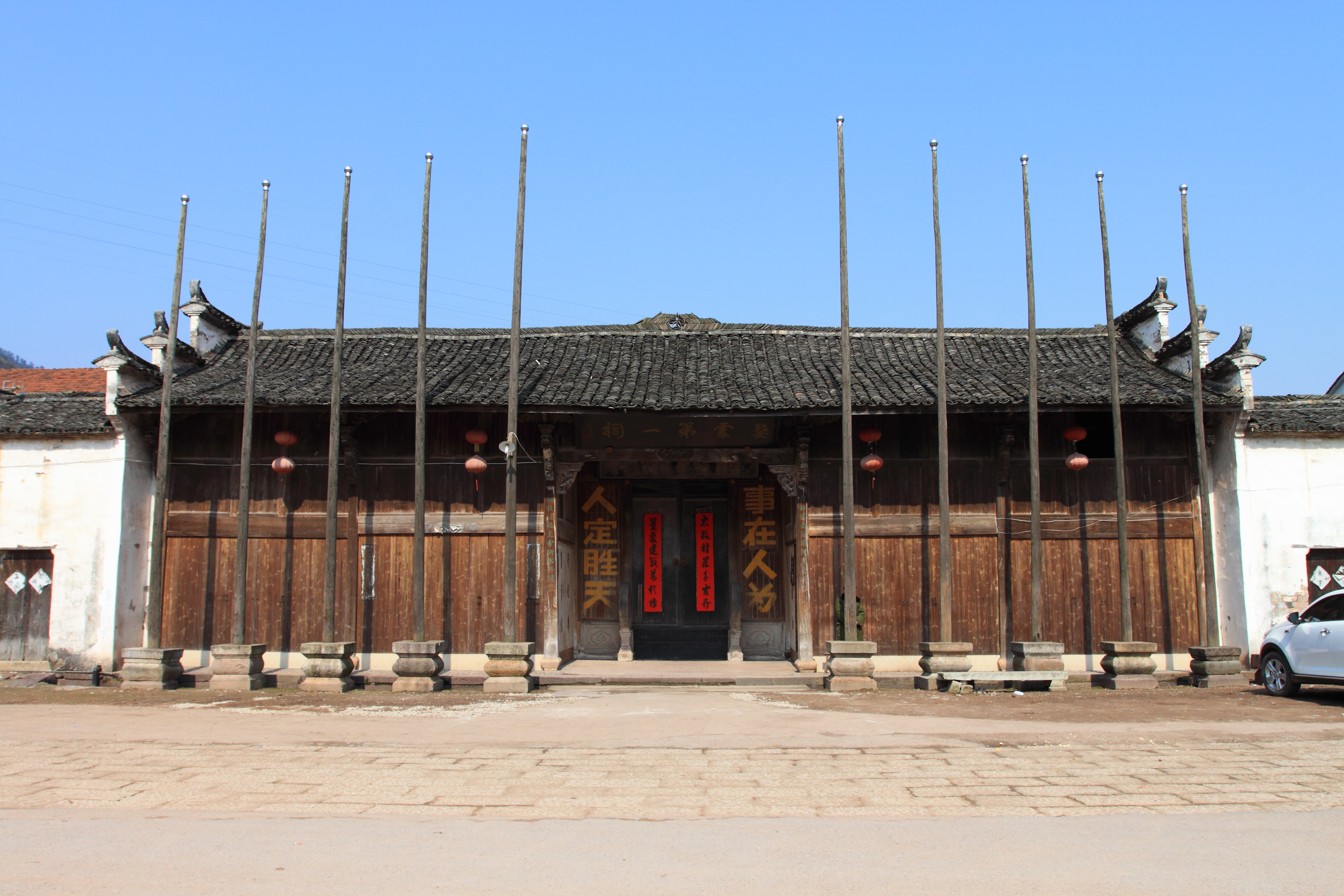
Yu shrine in Zhejiang

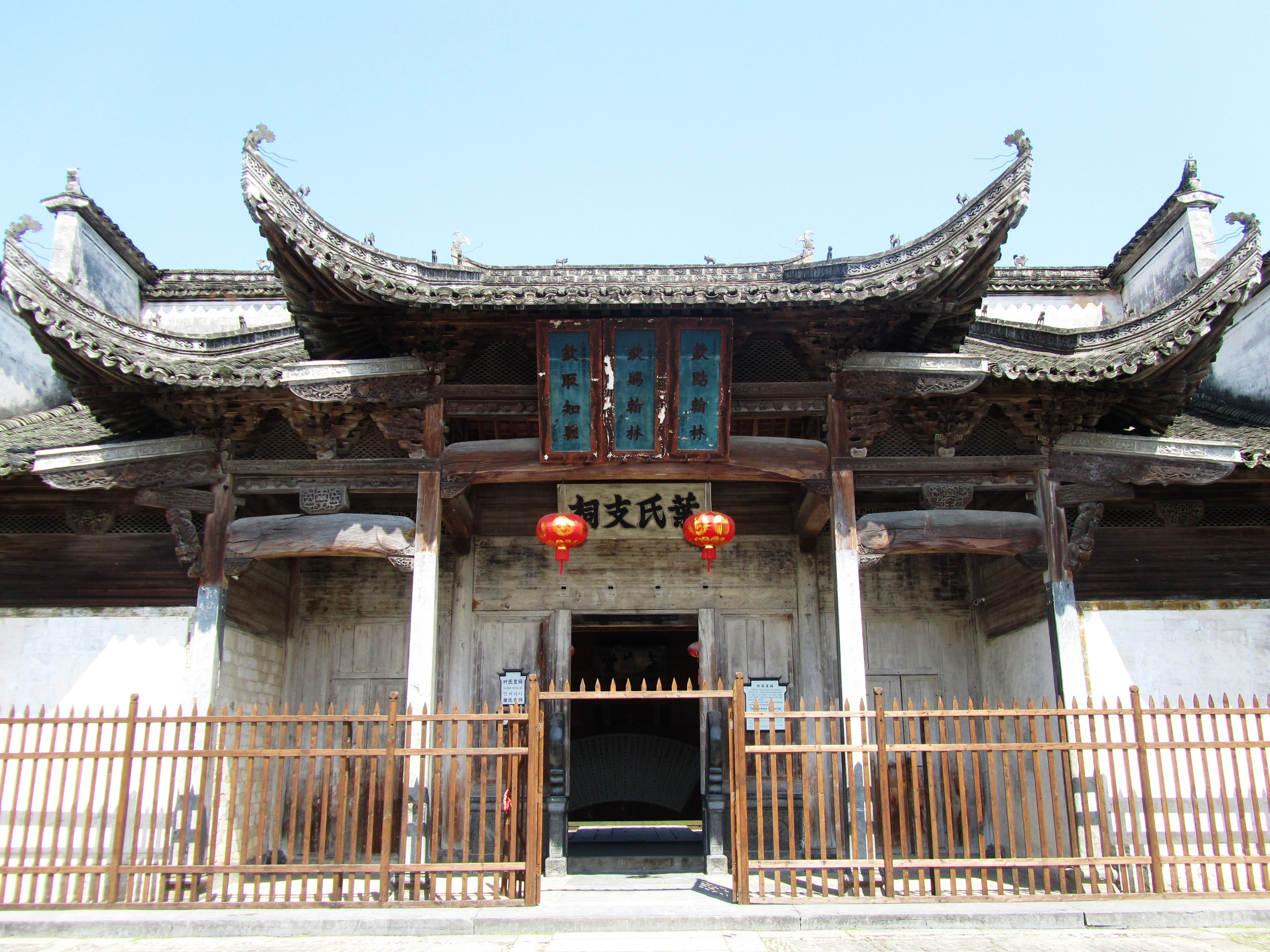
Ye shrine in Anhui

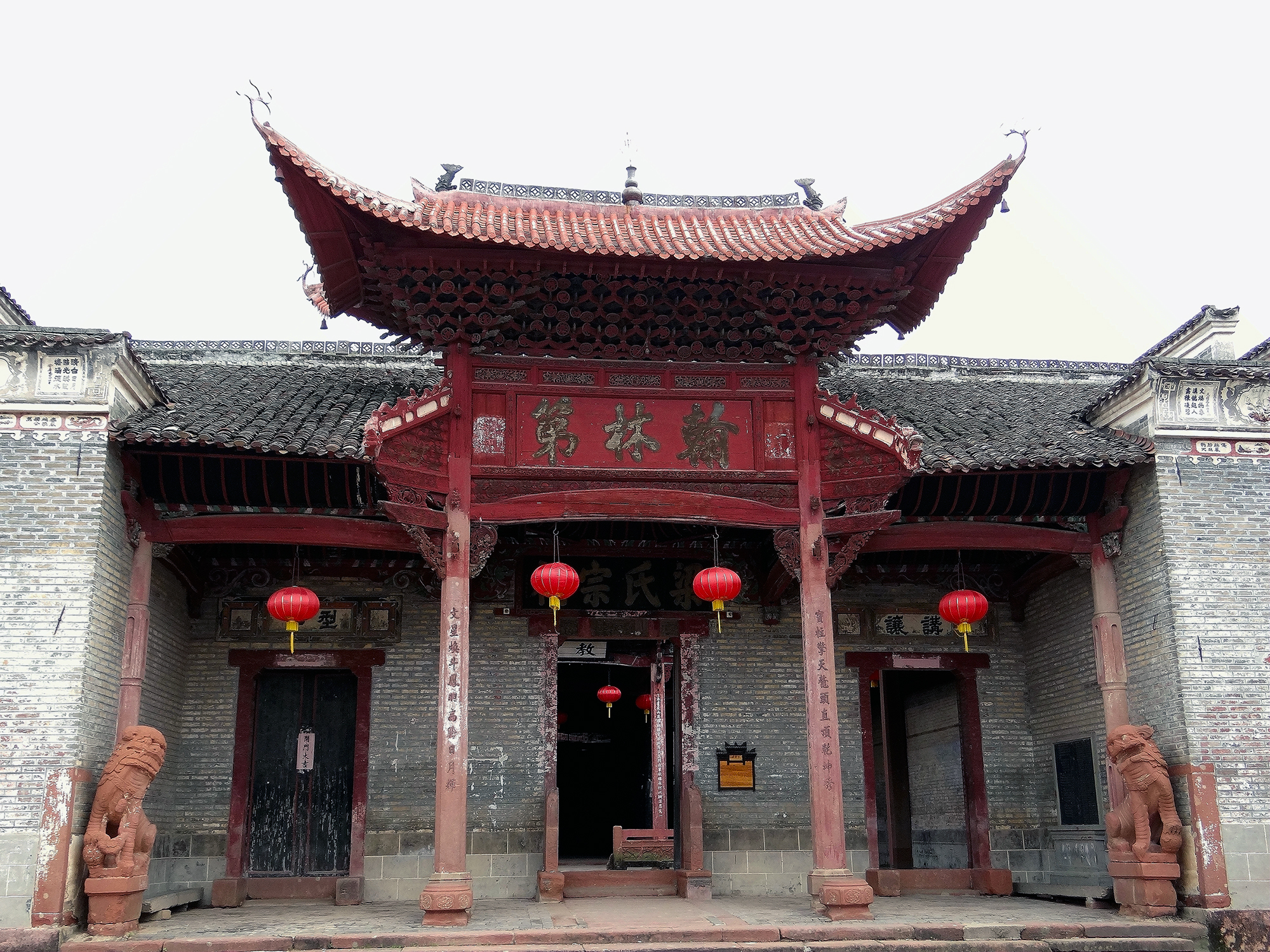
Liang shrine in Jiangxi

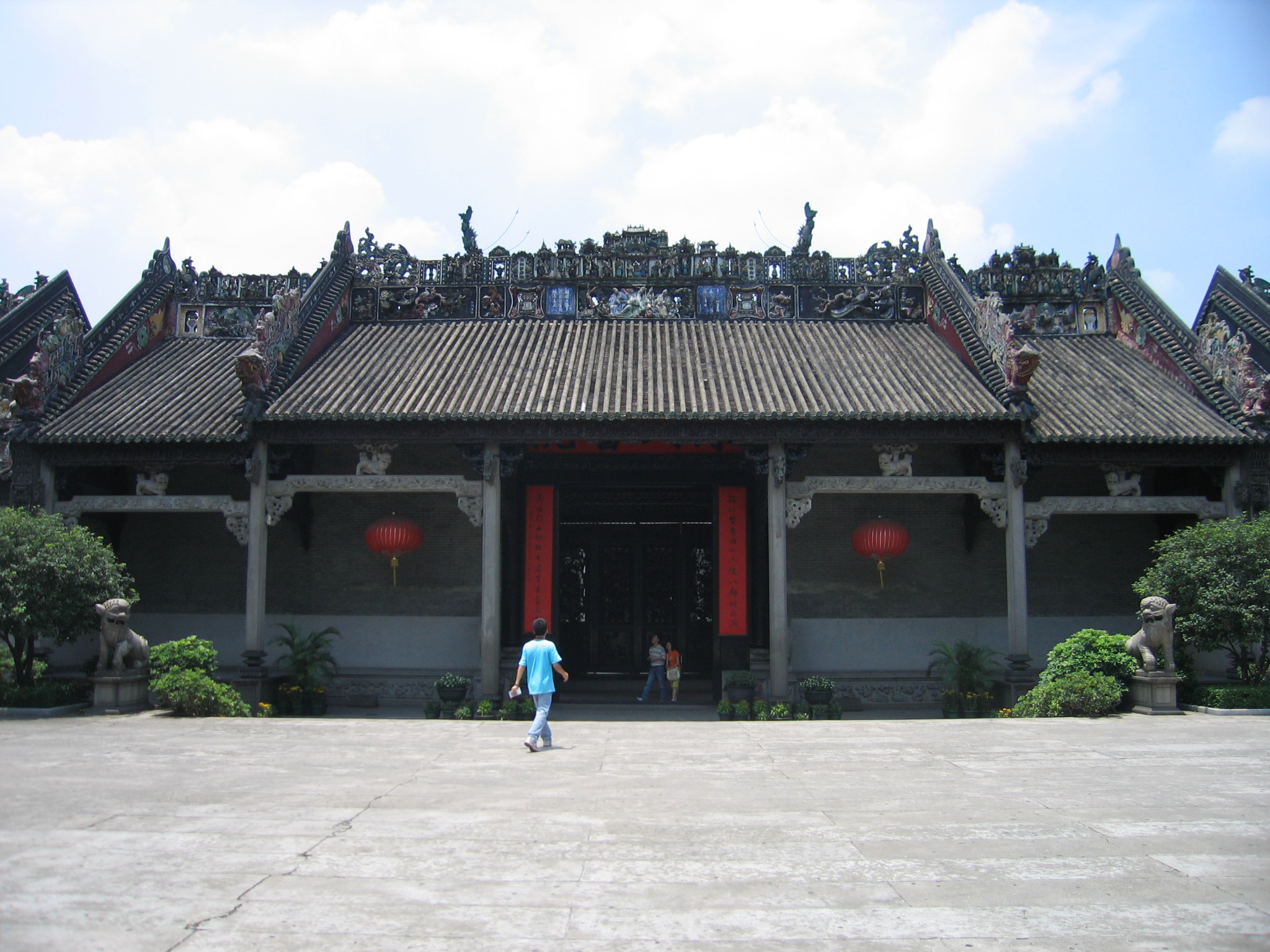
Chen shrine in Guangdong

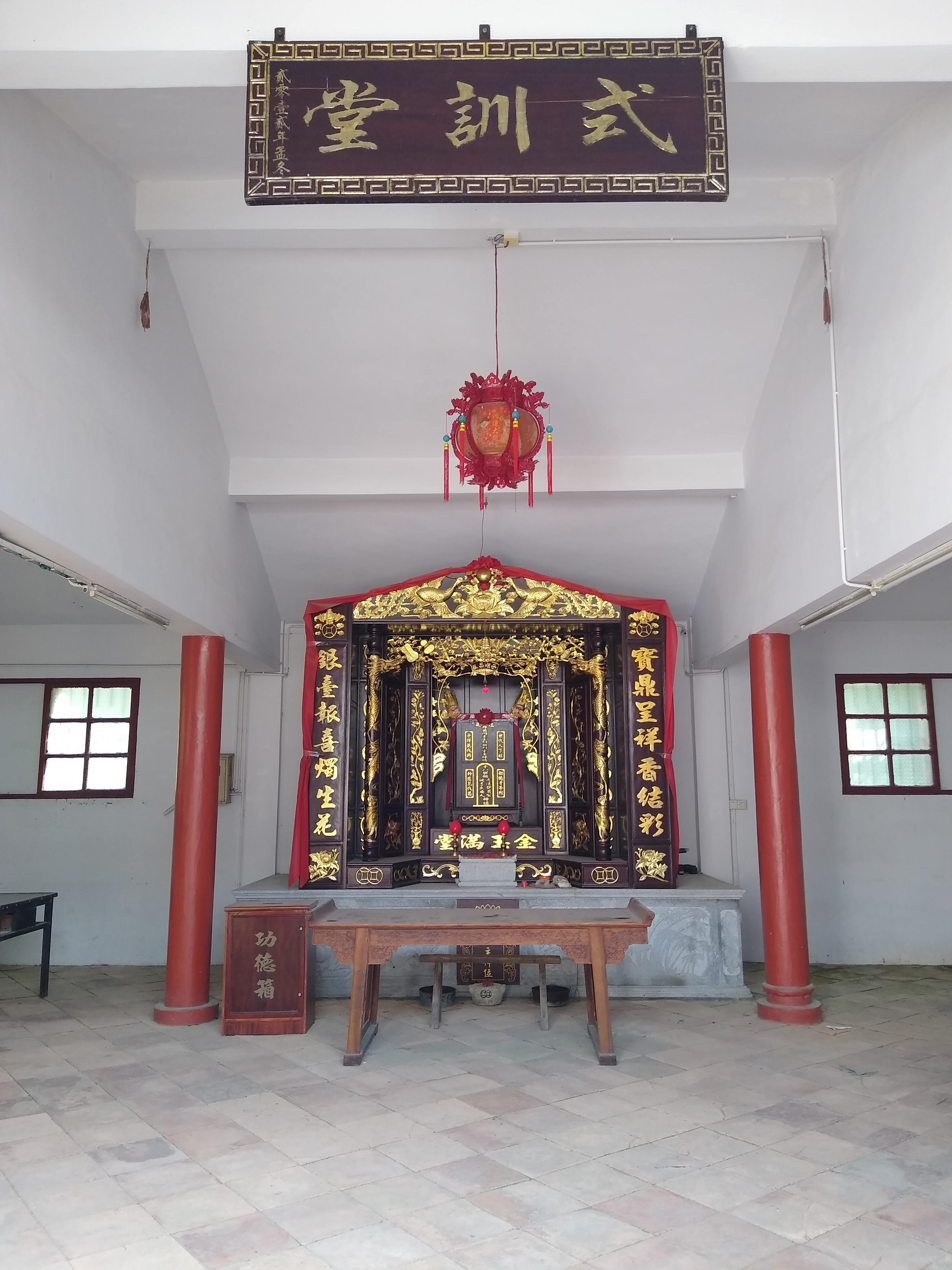
Huang shrine in Guangdong

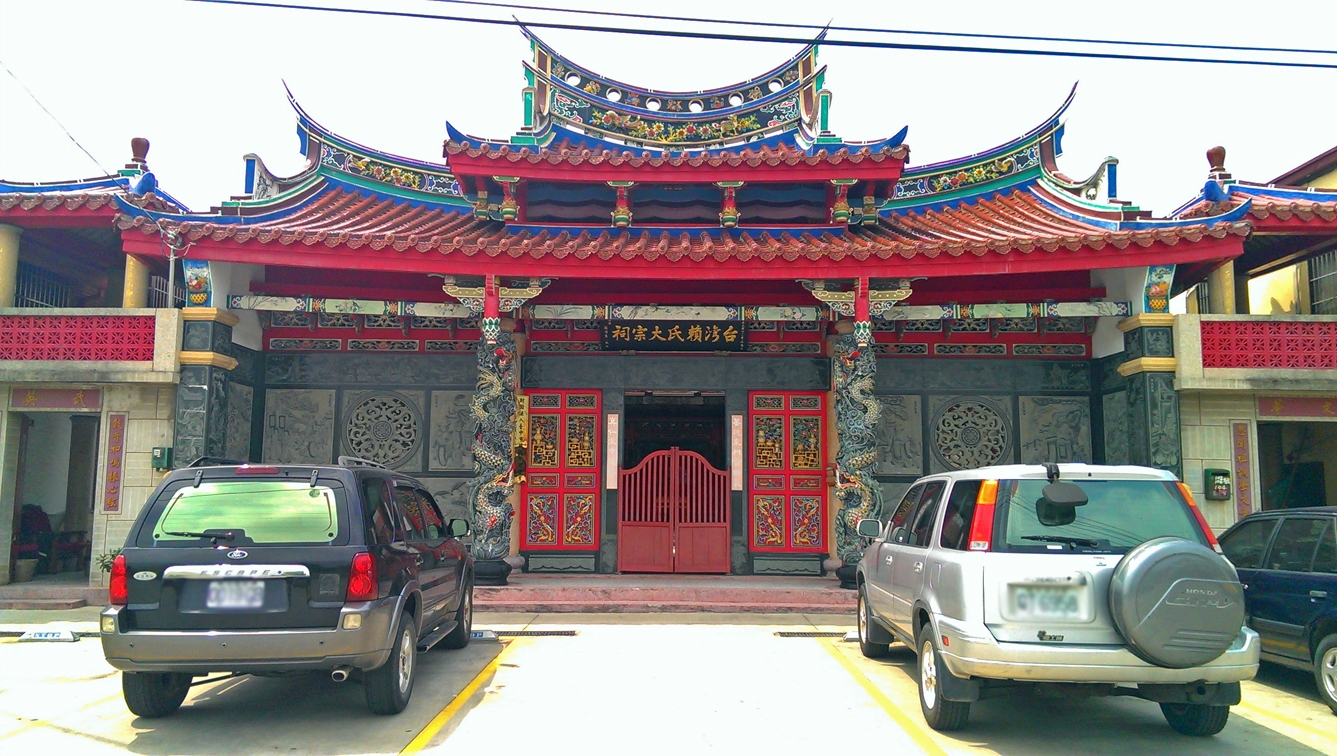
Lai shrine in Taiwan

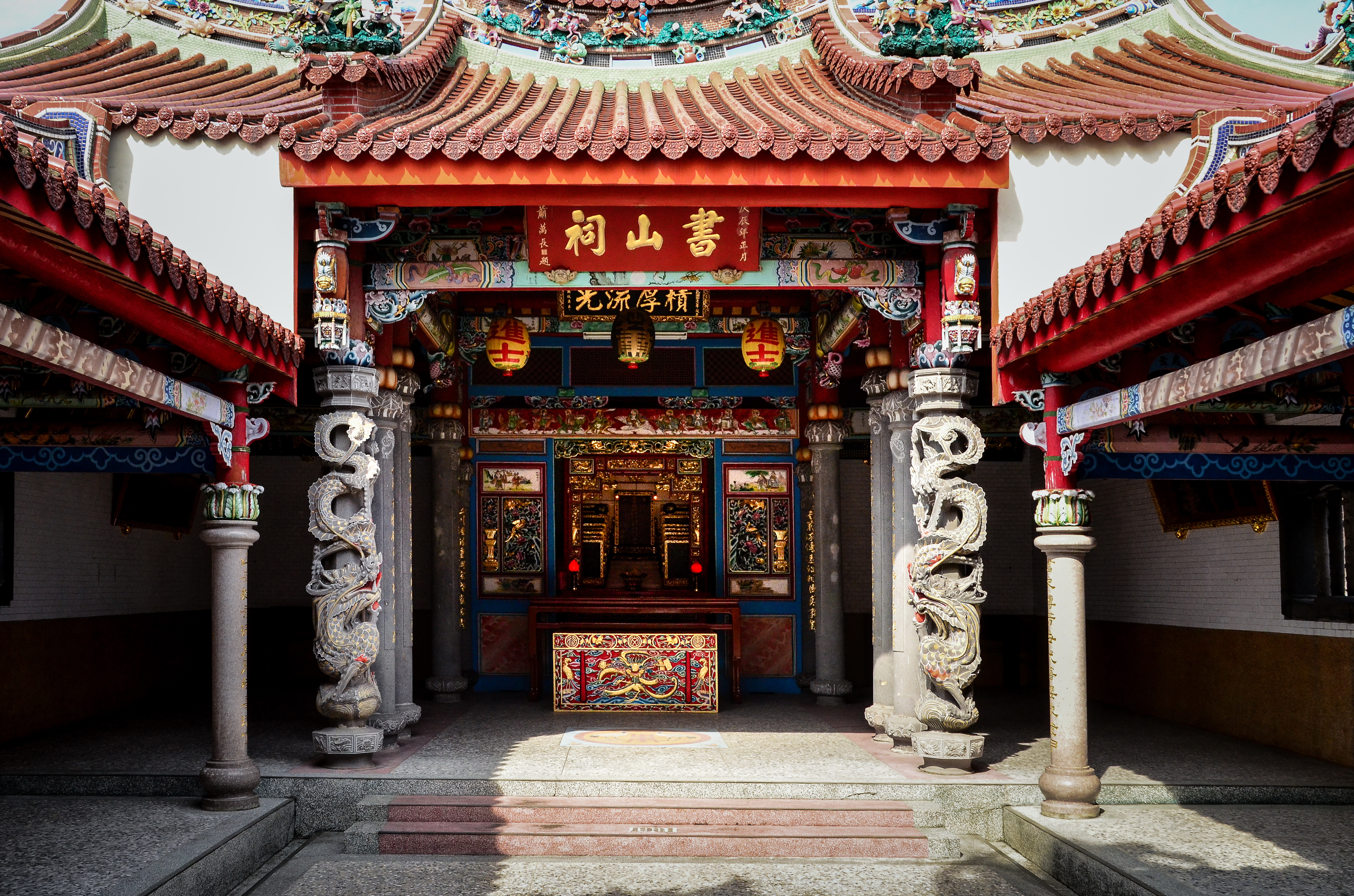
Xiao shrine in Tianzhong Township of Changhua County, Taiwan

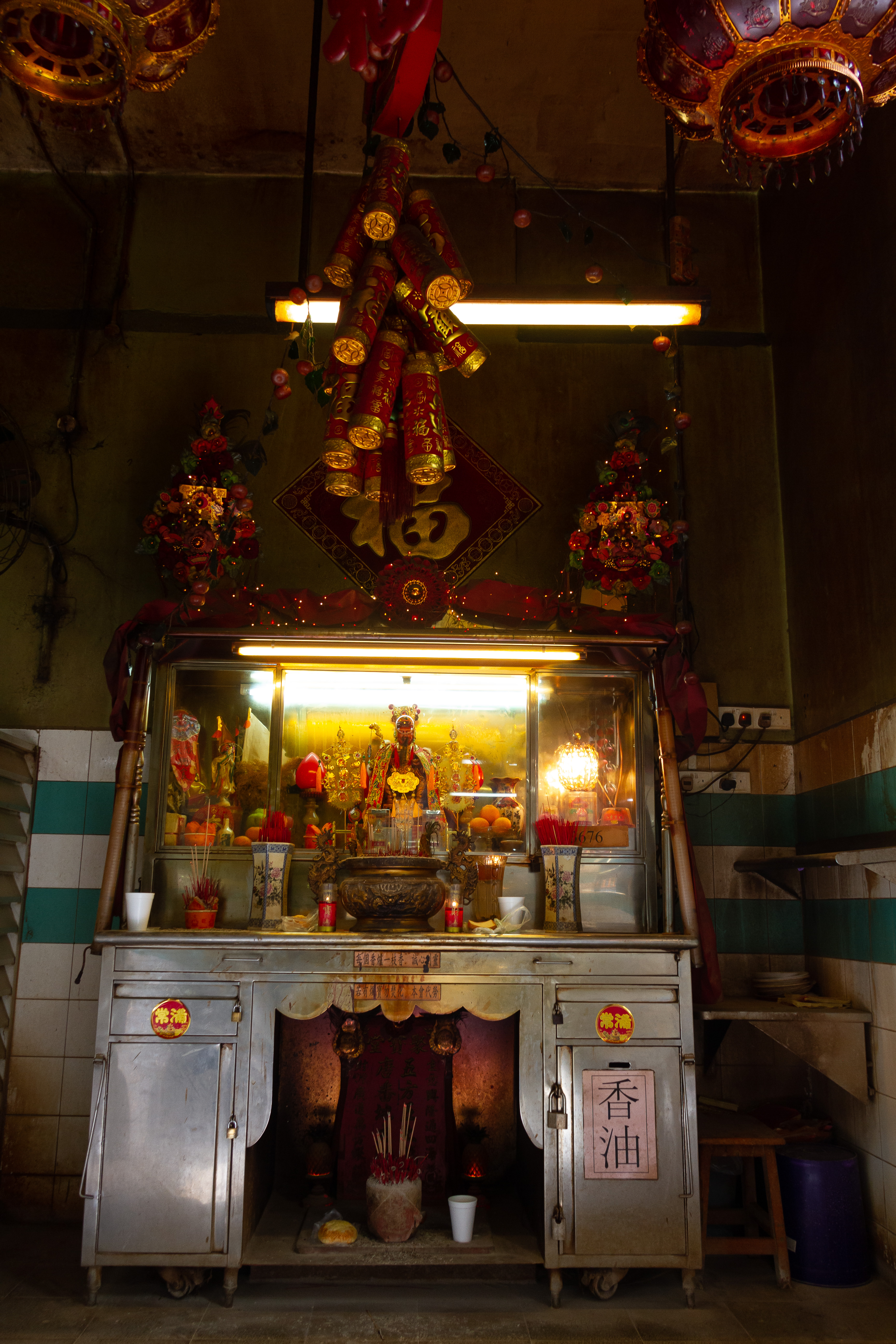
Public ancestral shrine in Chinatown Complex Food Centre, Singapore

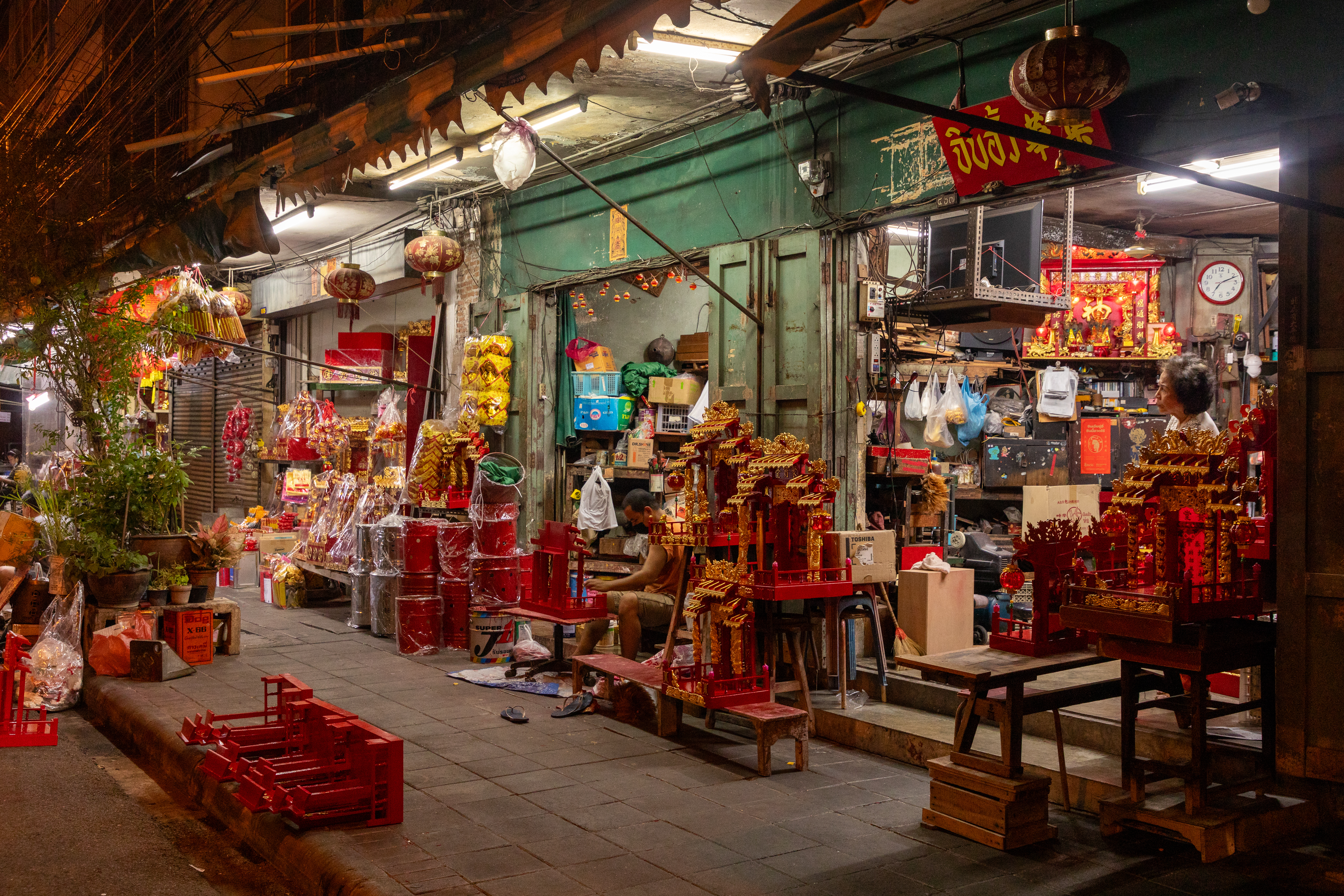
Home altar handicraft production in Chinatown, Bangkok

== See also ==
- Chinese folk religion
- Chinese ancestor worship
- Ancestor tablets
- Chinese lineage associations
- Ancestral home (Chinese)
- Chinese kin
- Guanxi
- Kongsi
- Bodaiji
- Jesa
