= Chinese temple =

Chinese religious temple

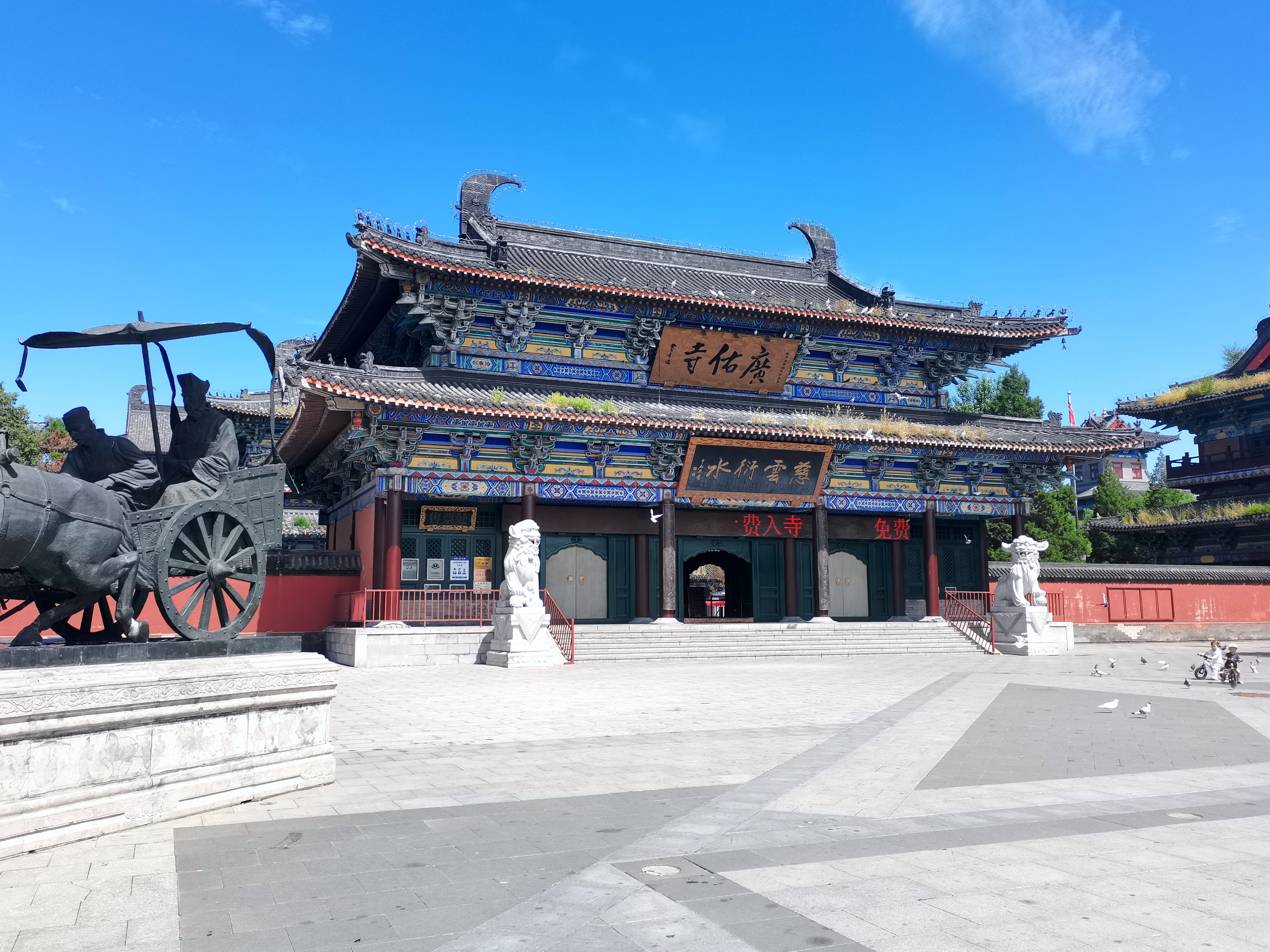
Guangyou Temple at Liaoyang, Liaoning, China.

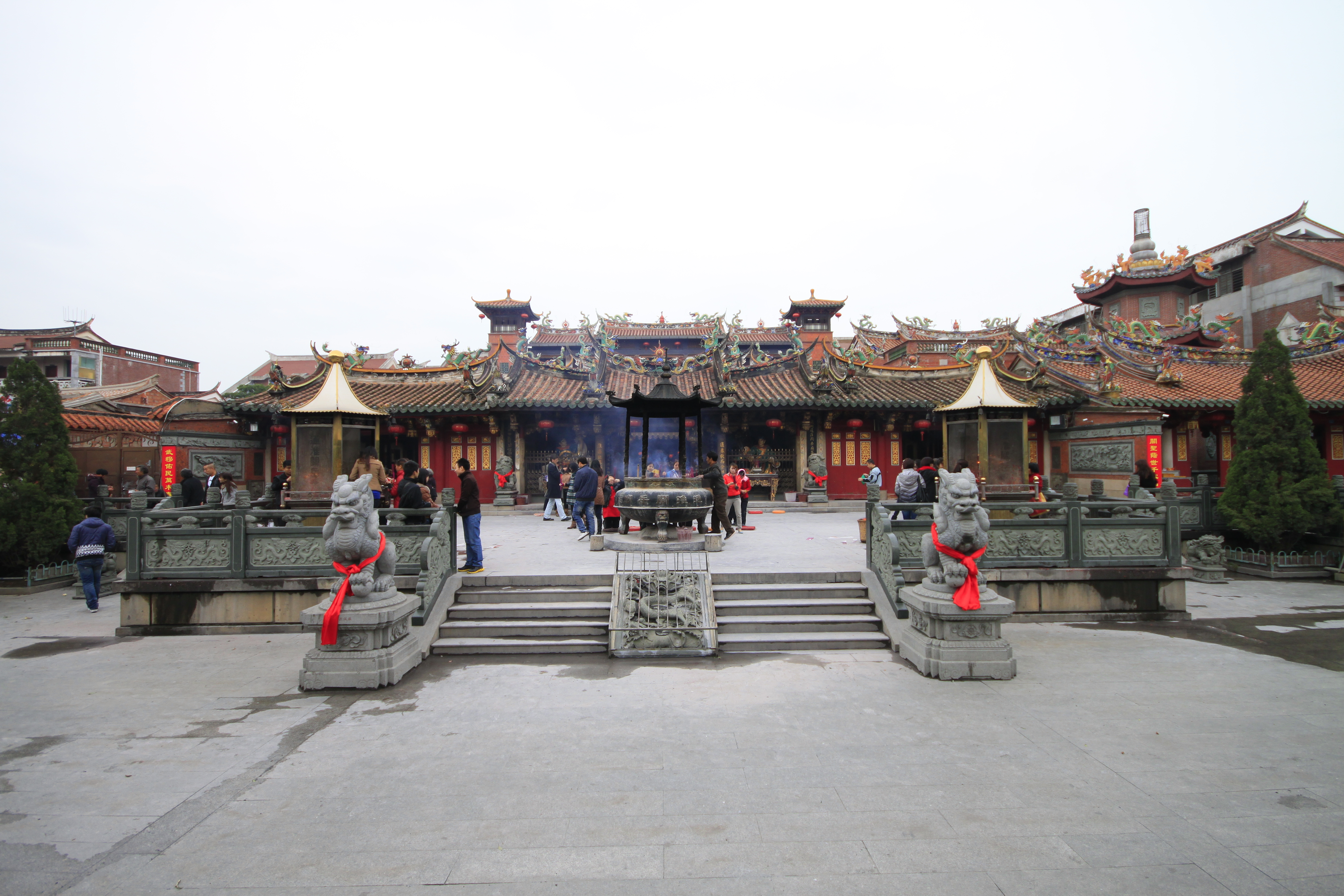
Temple of Guandi and Yue Fei in Quanzhou, Fujian.

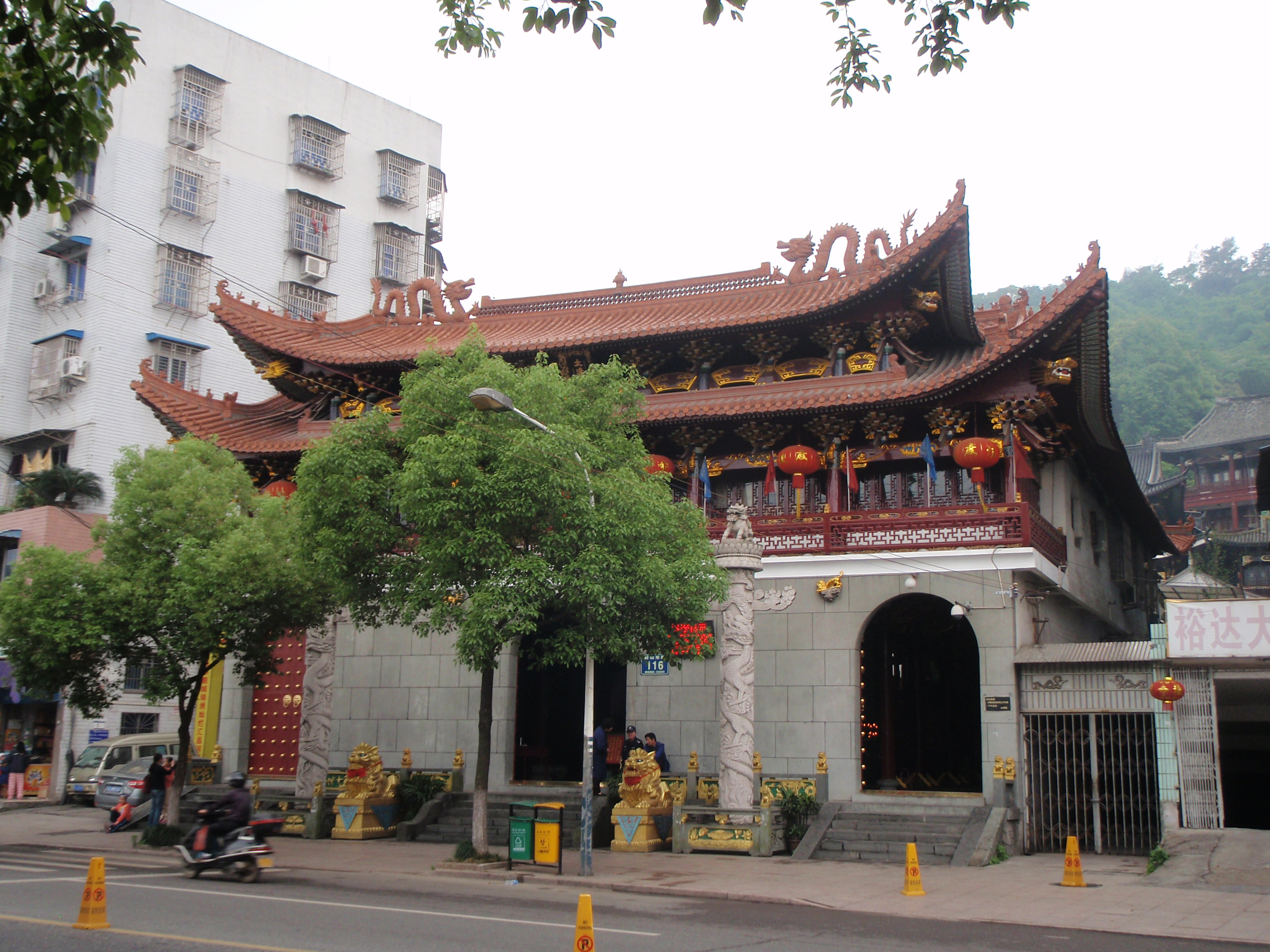
Temple of Bao Gong in Wenzhou, Zhejiang.

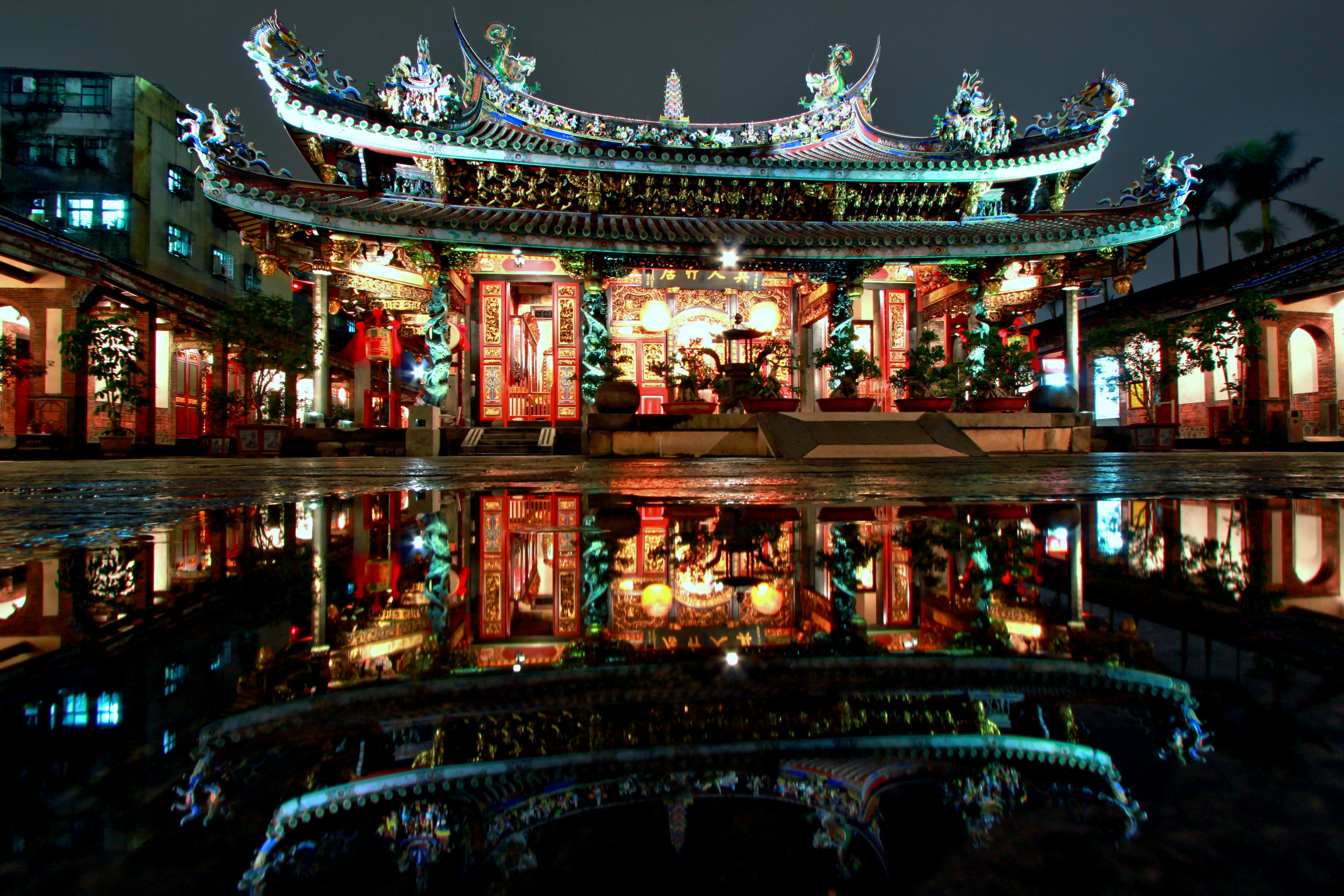
Night view of the Dalongdong Baoan Temple in Taipei, Taiwan.

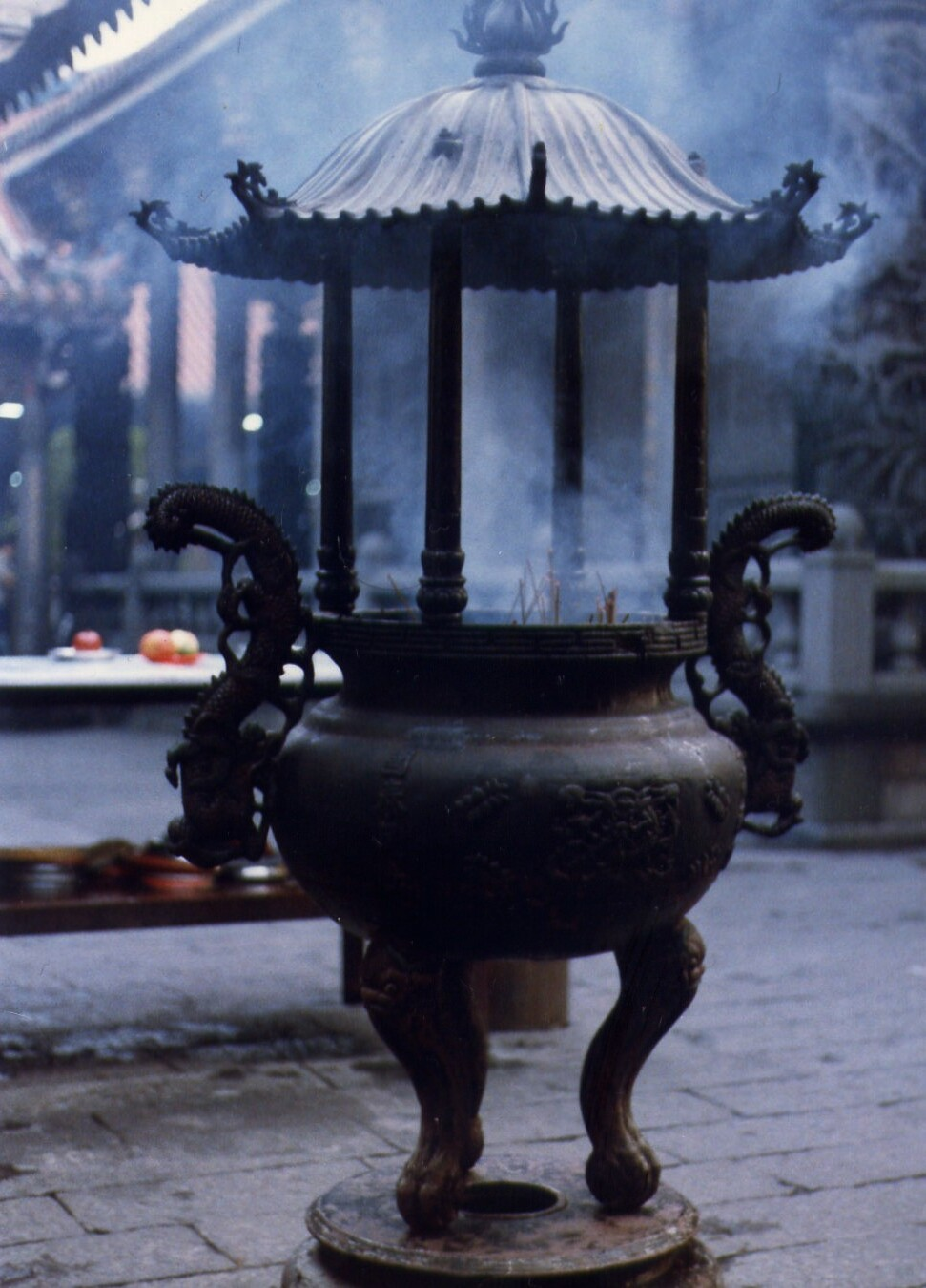
Chinese temple incense burner

Chinese temples are structures used as place of worship of Chinese Buddhism, Taoism, Confucianism, or Chinese folk religion, where people revere ethnic Chinese gods and ancestors. They can be classified as:

- miào (廟) or diàn (殿), simply means "temple" and mostly enshrines gods of the Chinese pantheon, such as the Dragon King, Tudigong or Matsu; or mythical or historical figures, such as Guandi or Shennong.
- cí (祠), cítáng (祠堂), zōngcí (宗祠) or zǔmiào (祖廟), referring to ancestral temples, mostly enshrining the ancestral gods of a family or clan.
- Taoist temples and monasteries: 觀 guàn or 道觀 dàoguàn; and
- Chinese Buddhist temples and monasteries: 寺 sì or 寺院 sìyuàn
- Temple of Confucius which usually functions as both temple and town school: 文廟 wénmiào or 孔廟 kŏngmiào.
- Temples of a City God (城隍廟), which worships the patron God of a village, town or a city.
- Smaller household shrines or votive niche, such as the worship of Zaoshen and Caishen.

Gōng (宮), meaning "palace" is a term used for a templar complex of multiple buildings, while yuàn (院), meaning "institution," is a generic term meaning "sanctuary" or "shrine". Táng (堂) means courtyard or room, and ān (庵) means dome or nunnery.

== Overview ==
Shen temples are distinct from Taoist temples in that they are established and administered by local managers, village communities, lineage congregations and worship associations. They do not have professional priests, although Taoist priests, fashi, Confucian lisheng, and also wu and tongji shamans, may perform services within the temples. Shenist temples are usually small and decorated with traditional figures on their roofs (dragons and deities), although some evolve into significant structures.

Chinese temples can be found throughout Mainland China and Taiwan, and also where Chinese expatriate communities have settled. An old name in English for Chinese traditional temples is "joss house". "Joss" is an Anglicized spelling of deus, the Portuguese word for "god". The term "joss house" was in common use in English in the nineteenth century, for example in North America during frontier times, when joss houses were a common feature of Chinatowns. The name "joss house" describes the environment of worship. Joss sticks, a kind of incense, are burned inside and outside of the temple.

== History ==
In 1898, Kang Youwei persuaded the Emperor to issue an edict confiscating folk religion temples which were not performing state sacrifices and turn them into schools. The temple confiscations were shortly reversed. The policy set a precedent for future campaigns in China.

Beginning in 1901, and more so after 1904, local officials and reform activists seized temple land and infrastructure to build schools, self-administration bureaus, barracks, police stations, post offices, and other newly mandated public buildings.

The Republic of China continued the Qing-era drive to convert temples into other institutions. Yuan Shikai supported the conversion of temples into public property.

As part of its campaigns against temples, the Nationalist government issued standards for whether temples should be preserved or eliminated. Temples tied to religions that were deemed legitimate were acceptable, as were those for the worship of "former worthies" (religious figures deemed socially or nationally useful). The 1928 "Standards for retaining or abolishing gods and shrines" formally abolished all cults of gods with the exception of human heroes such as Yu the Great, Guan Yu and Confucius. Regulations for the campaigns against temples were amorphous and whether a temple's deity was deemed legitimate could be a matter a debate; implementation of the campaigns was accordingly uneven.

After 1928, the ROC campaign to against folk religion temples became more intense, particularly in north China, and increasingly emphasized the physical destruction of temples. The ROC temple conversion campaign lasted until the start of the Second Sino-Japanese War.

Warfare during the ROC era resulted in the decline of temple fairs.

The Nationalist government of the Republic of China sought to tax commerce at temple fairs; its efforts to do so were limited by warfare and the deterioration of economic conditions.

In the early People's Republic of China, the government sought to use temple fairs as an opportunity to promote trade, agricultural practices, and the Chinese Communist Party's policies and goals.

Between 1951 and 1958, the Ministry of Culture repaired more than a hundred monasteries, pagodas, and stupas.

During the Great Leap Forward, the PRC used temple fairs as events to promote scientific education, and new technology and inventions.

Most temples closed during the Cultural Revolution, as religious life ceased to become public and religious practice became a household or semi-secret matter.

Estimates hold that between the end of the Mao era and 2016, from one to million temples had been rebuilt or restored.

The practice of temple fairs revived quickly in the 1980s in the PRC.

== See also ==
- Jingxiang
- Taoist temple
- Confucian temple
- Chinese ritual mastery traditions
- Chinese folk religion
- Chinese folk religion in Southeast Asia
- List of Mazu temples
- List of City God Temples in China
- List of temples in Taichung, Taiwan
- Tin Hau temples in Hong Kong
- Kwan Tai temples in Hong Kong
- Chinese temples in Kolkata
