= List of buildings by Friedensreich Hundertwasser =

This list includes all architectural projects realized by Friedensreich Hundertwasser including new buildings, alterations and design of buildings.

Hundertwasser started to work as an architect at the age of 55 already having a reputation as a painter. According to the views of the artist, every person is entitled to decorate his house. Hundertwasser's architecture differs from functionalism and rationalism typical of the 20th century, by his use of bright colors, decorations, distorted lines and the desire to be in harmony with nature. Hundertwasser believed that only a few buildings are "healthy." He made numerous restructuring and renewal of residential and functional buildings and had a reputation as "the doctor of architecture" because he treated buildings by decorating them in order to diminish the visual pollution of the environment. The largest architectural project of Friedensreich Hundertwasser is the hotel complex Rogner Bad Blumau in Austria, completed in 1997.

Image	Name	Year started	Year completed	Place	Country
	Mierka Getreidesilo (Mierka Getreidesilo)	1982	1983	Krems an der Donau	Austria
	Rupertinum (de:Rupertinum)	1980	1985	Salzburg	Austria
	Hundertwasserhaus	1983	1985	Vienna	Austria
	Hundertwasser village (Kalke Village)	1990	1991	Vienna	Austria
	Oncological department of the university hospital (Krankenstation (Onkologie))	1991	1994	Graz	Austria
	Textile factory Rueff und Hausnummern (Textilfabrik Rueff und Hausnummern)	1982	1988	Zwischenwasser	Austria
	Spittelau incineration plant (de:Müllverbrennungsanlage Spittelau)	1988	1992	Vienna	Austria
	KunstHausWien	1989	1991	Vienna	Austria
	St.-Barbara Church in Bärnbach (St.-Barbara-Kirche Bärnbach)	1984	1988	Bärnbach	Austria
	Village museum in Roiten (Dorfmuseum Roiten)	1987	1988	Rappottenstein	Austria
	Motorway Restaurant, Bad Fischau (Autobahnrasthaus Bad Fischau)	1989	1990	Bad Fischau-Brunn	Austria
	Hot Springs Village, Bad Blumau (Thermendorf Blumau)	1993	1997	Bad Blumau	Austria
	Spiral fountain І (SpiralflussTrinkbrunnen I)	1994	1994	Linz	Austria
	Fountain at Zwettl (Brunnenanlage Zwettl)	1992	1994	Zwettl	Austria
	Spiral fountain ІІ (SpiralflussTrinkbrunnen ІІ)	1996	1996	Tel Aviv	Israel
	Playa de Mogan "El Nido" (Playa de Mogan "El Nido")	1991		Canary Islands	Spain
	Ronald McDonald Kindervallei (Ronald McDonald Kindervallei)	2005	2007	Valkenburg aan de Geul	Netherlands
	Waldspirale	1998	2000	Darmstadt	Germany
	Rosenthal factory (de:Rosenthal GmbH)	1980	1982	Selb	Germany
	Kuchlbauer Tower	2007	2010	Abensberg	Germany
	Hundertwasser kindergarten (de:Hundertwasser-Kindertagesstätte)	1988	1995	Heddernheim (Frankfurt am Main)	Germany
	Die Grüne Zitadelle von Magdeburg (de:Grüne Zitadelle von Magdeburg)	2004	2005	Magdeburg	Germany
	Luther-Melanchthon-Gymnasium (de:Luther-Melanchthon-Gymnasium)	1997	1999	Wittenberg	Germany
	Ronald McDonald House Charities (de:Ronald McDonald Haus)	2004	2005	Essen	Germany
	Wohnen unterm Regenturm	1991	1994	Plochingen	Germany
	Uelzen station	1999	2000	Uelzen	Germany
	Wohnen in den Wiesen Bad Soden	1990	1993	Bad Soden	Germany
	Hundertwasser toilet block in Kawakawa	1999	1999	Kawakawa	New Zealand
	Quixote Winery	1992	1999	Napa Valley AVA	United States
	Market at Altenrhein (Markthalle Altenrhein)	1998	2001	Altenrhein	Switzerland
	Maishima Incineration Plant	1997	2001	Osaka	Japan
	Maishima Sludge Center	2000	2004	Osaka	Japan
	Kids Plaza Osaka	1996	1997	Osaka	Japan
	Countdown 21st Century Monument for TBS	1992	1992	Tokyo	Japan
	Hundertwasser Art Centre		2022	Whangārei	New Zealand

== Bibliography ==
- Pierre Restany: Die Macht der Kunst, Hundertwasser. Der Maler-König mit den fünf Häuten. Taschen, Köln 1998, ISBN 3-8228-7856-1.
- Wieland Schmied: Hundertwasser 1928-2000. Persönlichkeit, Leben, Werk. Taschen, Köln 2009, ISBN 978-3-8228-4108-2.
- Hundertwasser Architektur – Für ein natur- und menschengerechteres Bauen. Köln: Taschen, 2006.
