= René Brô =

French artist (1930–1986)

- Born: René Brault; November 21, 1930; Charenton, France
- Died: December 6, 1986 (aged 56); Courgeron; Le Pin-au-Haras; Lower Normandy, France
- Known for: painter drawer potter

René Brô (French pronunciation: [ʁəne bʁo]; November 21, 1930 – December 6, 1986) was a French artist.

== Life and work ==
René Brô was born in Charenton outside Paris. After finishing his schooling in 1944 by the age of fourteen, he began study art at different art schools. Parallelly he supported himself as a commercial artist. In the late 1940s, he was a frequent visitor to Musée de l'Homme and Louvre. He was in particularly attracted to primitive art and to the art of ancient Egypt. Brô's works of this period – pottery, drawings and paintings – are close to the works of Paul Klee or to that which Jean Dubuffet characterized as art brut.

In 1949 René Brô was exhibiting for the first time, at a joint exhibition in Paris. Afterwards he hitchhiked to Italy. During this trip he got to know the Austrian painter Hundertwasser who was two years Bro’s senior and was on the move as well; they were to be lifelong friends. Soon after their return to France in 1950, they jointly grappled with mural painting on the walls of a pavilion of the family Dumage where Hundertwasser stayed in Saint-Mandé outside Paris. Many years later, when this building was to be torn down in 1964, the two murals were saved from the demolition. One of them, La pêche miraculeuse (The miraculous draught), is now in KunstHausWien, Hundertwasser's own museum in Vienna. The other wall, Paradis – Pays des hommes, oiseaux et navires (Paradise – Land of men, of trees, birds and ships) came to a synagogue on Long Island, New York, where it was removed in 2008.

These two friends went separate ways and got married, Brô had children, and both were engaged in their own artistic projects, but they accompanied each other on trips throughout the years to North Africa, Mexico, India, Nepal, and Polynesia. In 1957 and for some years after they shared a studio in the old French village of Courgeron in the municipality of Le Pin-au-Haras, Lower Normandy, a location where Brô at least went on visiting until his death.

In 1954 Brô had his first one-man exhibition in Paris. In 1964, he was invited to represent France at the Venice Biennial. In 1968 he set up a studio in Venice, where he later worked for a decade.

He had many successful exhibitions around Europe and the world in the 1970s and 1980s. In 1984 he spent several months in Tahiti, where he had a show at the Musée Gauguin. He returned two years later and then withdrew to his country house in the Norman Courgeron, dying at the age of 56.
