= Waldspirale =

Residential building complex in Darmstadt, Germany

Coordinates: 49°53′8″N 8°39′21″E

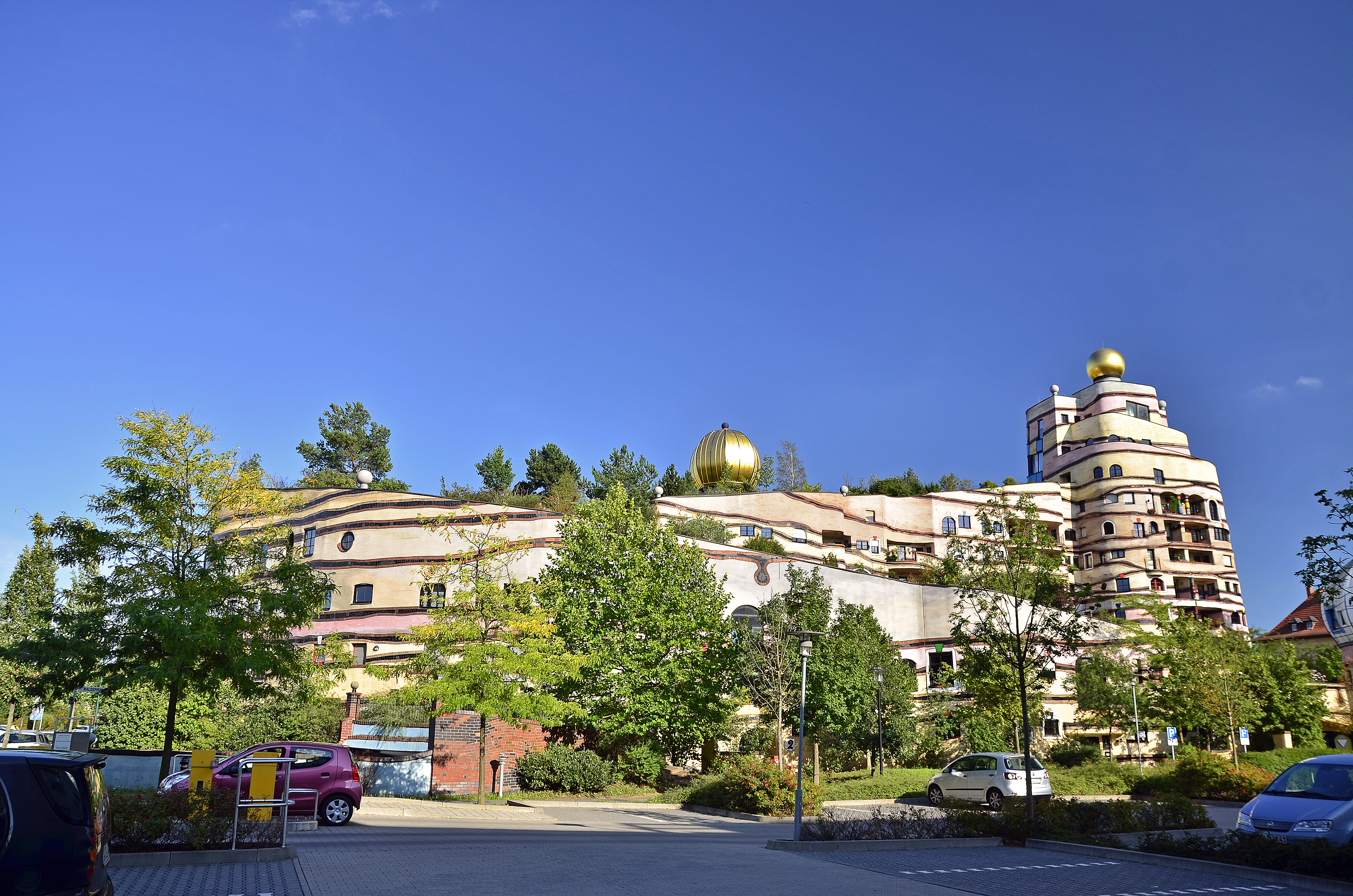
Waldspirale in Darmstadt

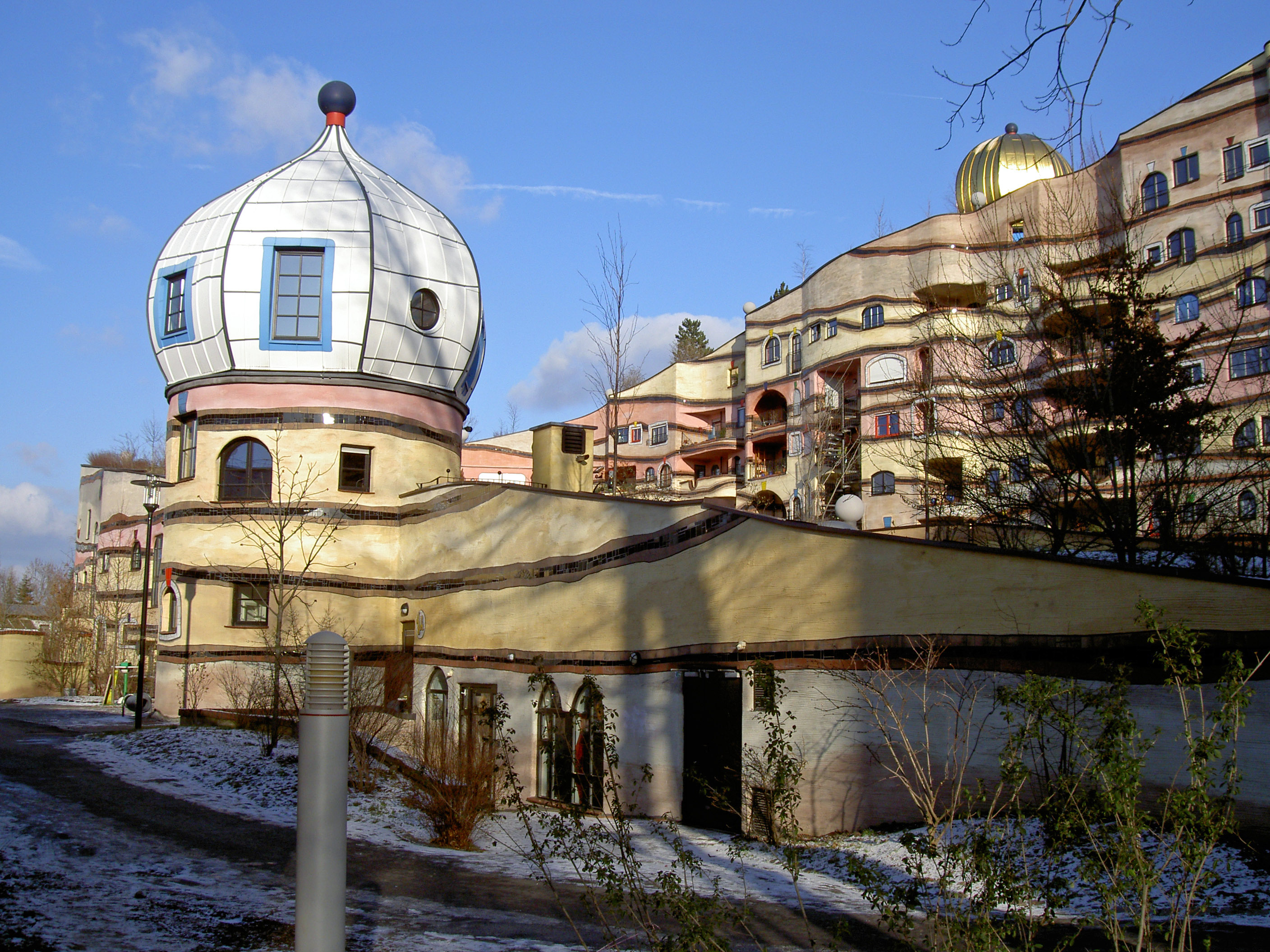
The tower, resembling Russian onion domes

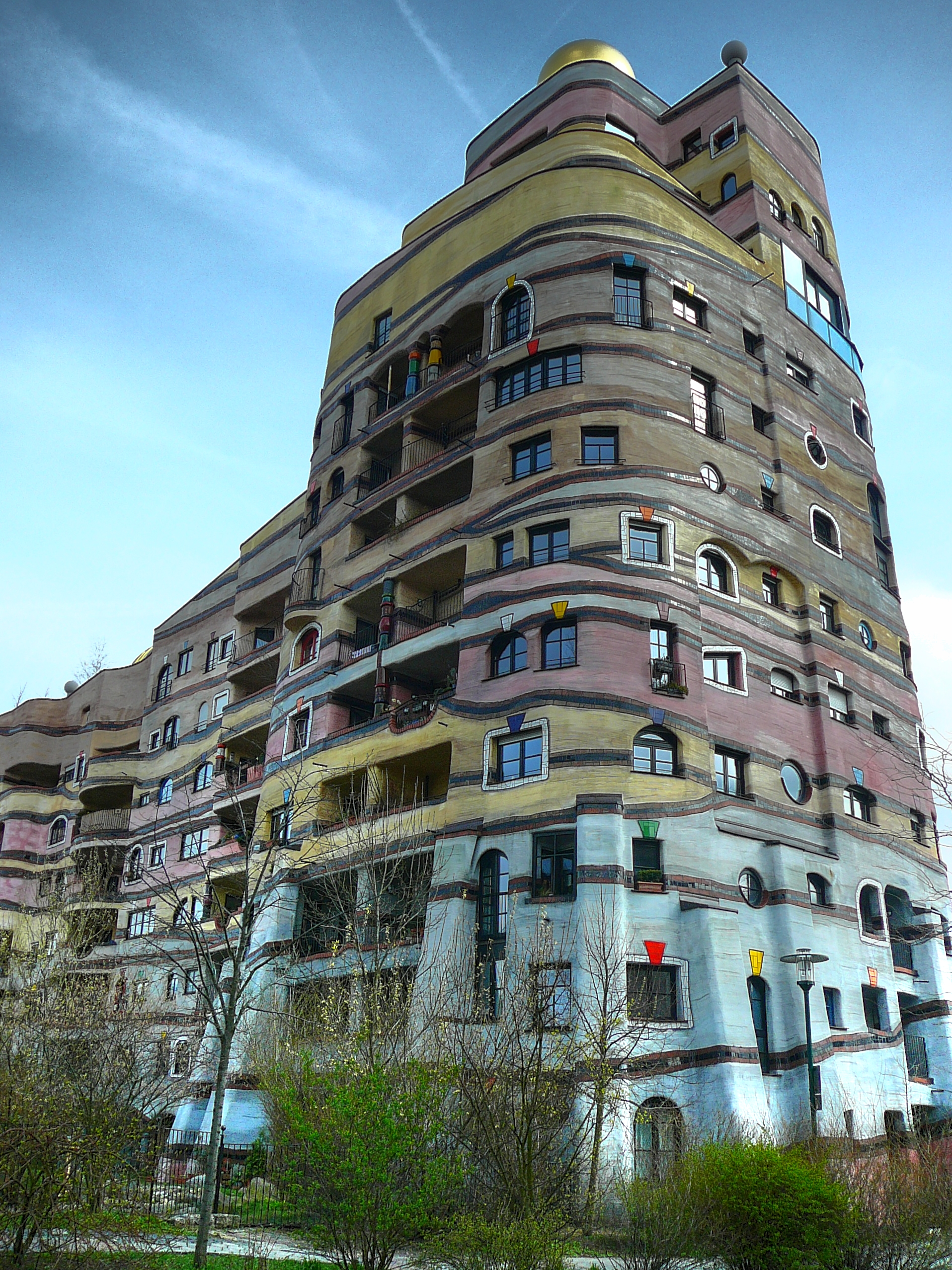
Another view of the complex

The Waldspirale is a residential building complex in Darmstadt, Germany, built in the 1990s. The name translates into English as forest spiral, reflecting both the general plan of the building and the fact that it has a green roof. It was designed by Austrian artist Friedensreich Hundertwasser, planned and implemented by architect Heinz M. Springmann, and constructed by the Bauverein Darmstadt company. The building was completed in 2000.

== Description ==
The Waldspirale apartment building is located in Darmstadt's Bürgerparkviertel. It contains 105 apartments and a parking garage. In the past, the topmost part of the building has had restaurants, cafes and bars for people to visit. Currently, there are no open amenities for visitors. The inner courtyard contains a playground for the children of the residents and a small artificial lake. Peculiarities of the U-shaped building are the unique facade, which does not follow a regular grid organization, and the windows, which appear as if they were "aus der Reihe tanzen" (dancing out of line), everywhere different and appearing out of order, often with 'tree tenants' – trees growing out from the windows. The diagonal roof, planted with grass, shrubs, flowers and trees, rises like a ramp along the U-form. At its highest point, the building has 12 floors.

== Design ==
The windows of the Waldspirale, which number over 1000, are all unique: no two windows are the same. Similarly, different handles are attached in each apartment to the doors and windows. Some of the apartments are decorated in Friedensreich Hundertwasser's personal style and exhibit the colourful tiles in the bath and kitchen that are characteristic of his work. Furthermore, all the corners are rounded off in these apartments along the roof and walls in an application of Hundertwasser's dogma "gegen die gerade Linie" or "against the straight line." For cost reasons, only a few of the apartments' interiors were designed individually.

From the outside, the typical elements of Hundertwasser's personal style attract attention: the gilded onion domes, the absence of straight lines and sharp corners, the multicoloured painting of the building in earth tones and the colourful ceramic columns.

== See also ==
- Hundertwasserhaus in Vienna
- Hundertwasserhaus Plochingen
- List of buildings by Friedensreich Hundertwasser
