= Wairau Māori Art Gallery =

Art gallery in Whangārei, New Zealand

The Wairau Māori Art Gallery is a public art gallery in Whangārei, New Zealand, dedicated to contemporary Māori art and customary practice. It is described as the first dedicated public Māori art gallery in Aotearoa New Zealand, joining a small number of public indigenous art galleries internationally.

== History ==
=== Origins ===
As part of the long path to opening the eventual museum, in 1992, Whangārei mayor Stan Semenoff invited the artist and architect Friedensreich Hundertwasser to select a site in Whangārei for a proposed public art gallery designed by him. Hundertwasser visited the site and produced preliminary sketches in 1993, but the project did not proceed further before his death in 2000. In 2008 the sketches were refined by Springmann Architektur, and HB Architecture completed the work.

=== Establishment (2012–2018) ===
The Prosper Northland Trust raised $12 million NZD for the art centre. In 2015, Mayor Sheryl Mai's council allocated $2.8 million NZD towards the development of the project. The Whangarei District Council contracted Elizabeth Hauraki as campaign director for the Hundertwasser Art Centre and it took approximately nine years for the museum to open including delays due to COVID 19 pandemic.

=== Leadership and governance ===
19 April 2022 Larissa McMillan (Ngāpuhi) was announced as Wairau Māori Art Gallery Inaugural Director / Te Ringa Hautu Toi. The gallery is overseen by the Wairau Māori Art Gallery Charitable Trust, made up of independent (tangata whenua) volunteer trustees including Elizabeth Ellis, an advocate for Maori art.

== Location ==
The gallery is housed within the Hundertwasser Art Centre in Whangārei, a building designed by the Austrian-born artist and architect Friedensreich Hundertwasser, who proposed plans for it before his death in 2000. The inclusion of a Māori art gallery within the centre originated from a proposal by Joram Harel of the Hundertwasser Non-Profit Foundation in Vienna during the project's early stages, and was developed in agreement with Māori to honour Hundertwasser's original design, which incorporated a Māori pou as a symbol of Māori art, culture, and tradition. The Hundertwasser art work is installed on the upper floor of the building, and the Maori art gallery is located on the ground floor. The Hundertwasser-designed building the art gallery is housed in won the Best Public Architecture Award from the New Zealand Institute of Architects.

=== Exhibitions and programme ===
The gallery presents a changing programme of exhibitions curated by invited Māori curators. It also runs a tuakana/teina (mentorship) initiative intended to support emerging Māori arts professionals. Education programmes and workshops are hosted by the gallery.
