= Noma Shepherd =

New Zealand community leader (1935–2023)

Noma Shepherd ONZM JP
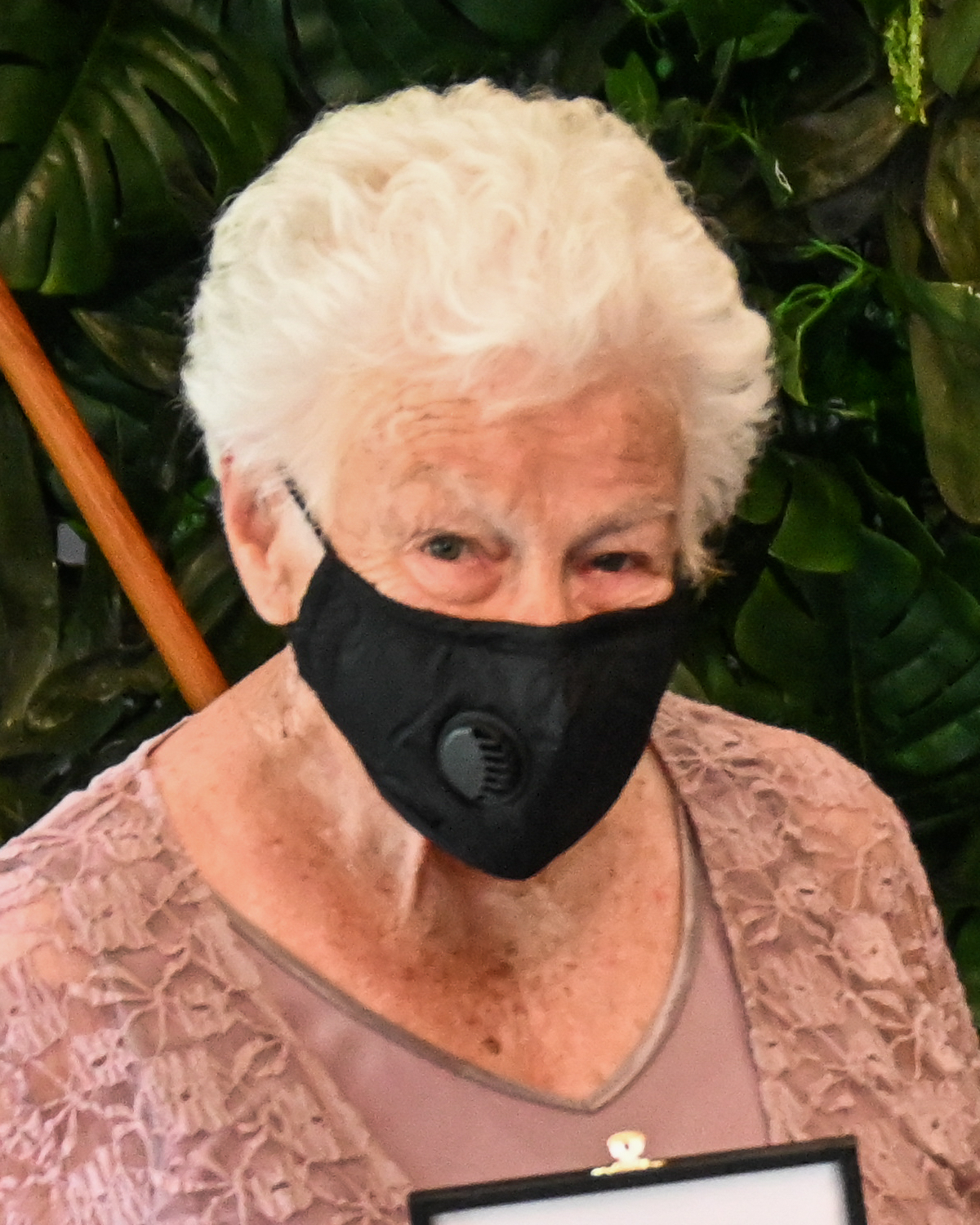
- Shepherd in 2022
- Born: Noma Jeanne Tidswell; 12 August 1935
- Died: 19 November 2023 (aged 88); Kawakawa, New Zealand
- Occupation: Community leader
- Spouse: Doug Shepherd (died 2008)

Noma Jeanne Shepherd ONZM JP (née Tidswell; 12 August 1935 – 19 November 2023) was a New Zealand community leader. Based in Kawakawa in the Bay of Islands area, Shepherd's contributions to the community over many years included supporting the creation of the Hundertwasser Toilets and being instrumental in the establishment of Te Hononga Hundertwasser Memorial Park, which opened in 2020.

== Life and career ==
Shepherd was born Noma Jeanne Tidswell on 12 August 1935, the daughter of Phyllis Jeanne and Raymond Clarence Tidswell.

Shepherd and her husband Doug were the farm managers for Friedensreich Hundertwasser at Kaurinui. In 1999 she worked with Hundertwasser and local volunteers to build the Hundertwasser Toilets, which became a tourist attraction in Kawakawa. She read a speech on Hundertwasser's behalf at the opening of the toilets, and re-read it at the 20-year anniversary celebration in 2019.

In 2007, Shepherd was the founding member of the Kawakawa Hundertwasser Park Charitable Trust, a charity set up to honour Hundertwasser's legacy in Kawakawa. She became the chair of the trust in 2011. In 2017, she successfully obtained council and government backing for the establishment of a memorial complex, which commenced building in 2018. The complex is designed to celebrate both Hundertwasser and local Māori heritage, and incorporates a library, visitor information centre, cafe and other facilities. Te Hononga Hundertwasser Memorial Park was opened by prime minister Jacinda Ardern in October 2020. Shepherd was instrumental in the development and opening of the building, and described it as one of her greatest achievements.

Shepherd was the chair of the Bay of Islands Community Board from 1997 to 2006, and served as secretary and chair of the Kawakawa Domain Board from 1997 to 2007. From 2003 to 2021 she was president of the Bay of Islands Senior Citizens' Club, from 2009 to 2021 she was the chair of the Kawakawa Memorial Museum Library Charitable Trust, and from 2005 to 2015 she was the Bay of Islands coordinator for the New Zealand Cancer Society's Daffodil Day. She was also president of the Taumarere Ōpua Women's Institute for 24 years, and served as a justice of the peace.

Shepherd died in Kawakawa on 19 November 2023, at the age of 88. She had been predeceased by her husband, Doug Shepherd, in 2008.

== Awards ==
In the 1997 New Year Honours, Shepherd was appointed a Member of the New Zealand Order of Merit, for services to the community. In the 2021 Queen's Birthday Honours, she was promoted to Officer of the New Zealand Order of Merit for services to the community, in recognition of her continued significant contributions to the Kawakawa and Bay of Islands communities. On her promotion, Shepherd said the award belonged to the whole community; "You can't do anything on your own. You've got to take the people with you or go with them."
