= Hundertwasser Art Centre =

Art and cultural centre in New Zealand

Coordinates: 35.7243°S 174.3250°E

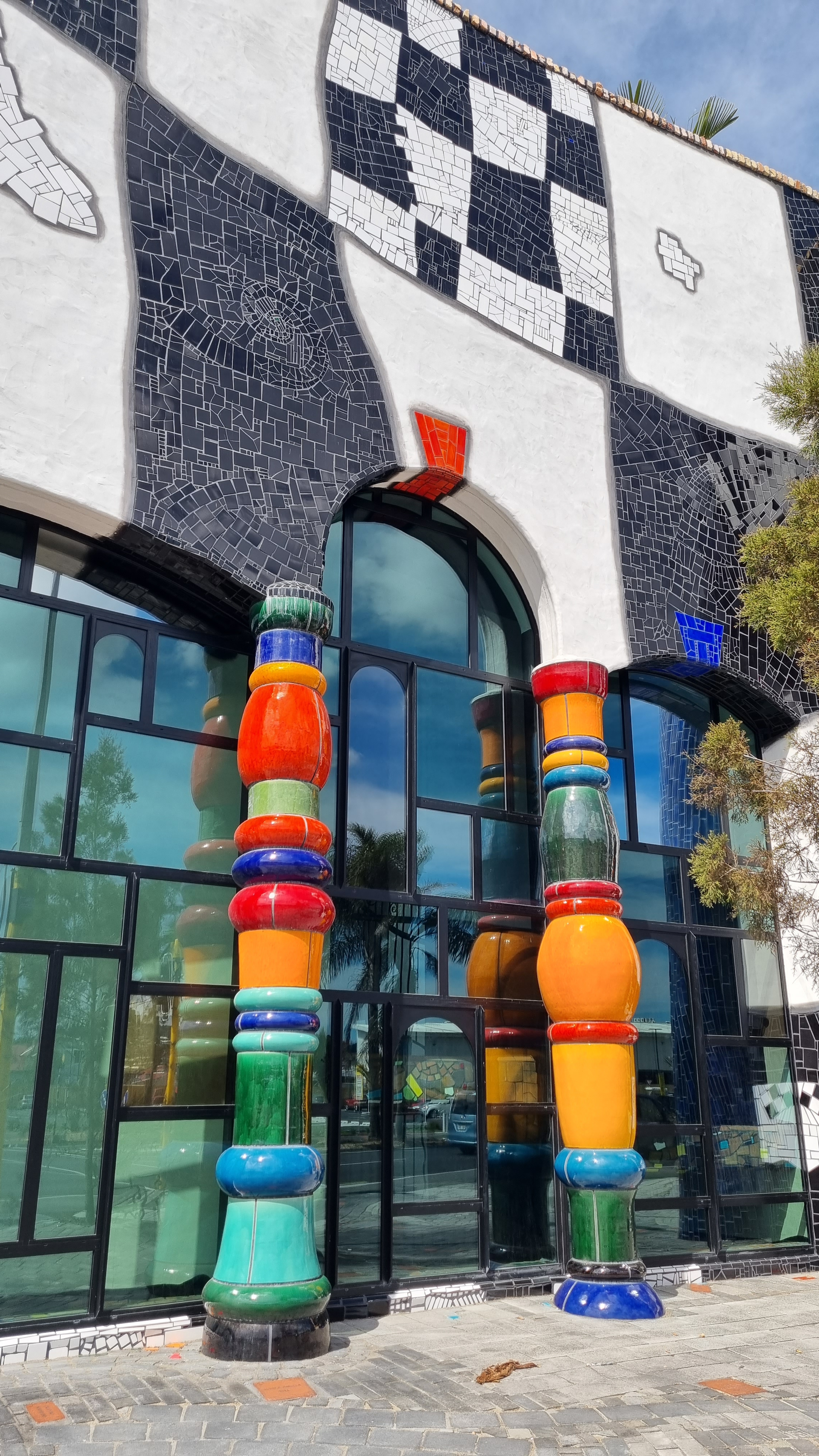
Hundertwasser Art Centre streetside

The Hundertwasser Art Centre with Wairau Māori Art Gallery is an art and cultural centre in Whangārei, New Zealand. It is the conception of artist and architect Friedensreich Hundertwasser, who lived near Kawakawa for 30 years, and was first designed in 1993. The project proved controversial and was considered and rejected a number of times until it was approved by a binding referendum in June 2015. The centre opened on 20 February 2022 with the inaugural exhibition, Puhi Ariki, curated by Nigel Borell.

== About ==
The Hundertwasser Art Centre with Wairau Māori Art Gallery is the last authentic Hundertwasser building in the world. It has a gallery on the top floor with 80 Hundertwasser original artworks and the Wairau Māori Art Gallery, a space for contemporary Māori artwork on the ground floor. The building also features a learning centre, a theatre, café, shop and an afforested roof containing rare native species.

=== Wairau Māori Art Gallery ===
The Wairau Māori Art Gallery is the world's first contemporary gallery dedicated to Māori artists with exhibitions curated by professional Māori curators for the permanent promotion of indigenous art in New Zealand. The name Wairau is the Māori translation of ‘one hundred waters’, the same meaning as the German Hundertwasser.

The gallery has a charitable trust board and operates independently and autonomous to the Hundertwasser Art Centre. In 2024 the chair of the board was Elizabeth Ellis.

== History of the building ==
The Austrian artist-architect Friedensreich Hundertwasser, who lived in the Bay of Islands for 30 years, designed an art centre for Whangārei in 1993. The council did not build it at that time because Hundertwasser selected a building owned by Northland Regional Council, who did not wish to sell it to the Whangārei District Council.

View from the river side

Hundertwasser went on to design the Hundertwasser Toilets for nearby Kawakawa, which became the major attraction for Kawakawa and are credited with providing an impetus for Kawakawa's economic recovery. After his death the Whangārei District Council revived plans to build the Hundertwasser Arts Centre and in 2012 signed a contract with Hundertwasser Non Profit Foundation to build it and to display authentic Hundertwasser work and contemporary Māori artwork there. The Hundertwasser Non Profit Foundation acknowledged this would be the last authentic Hundertwasser building, provided it was built on the building he selected.

This project was costed, consented, agreed and included in the Long Term Council Plan. The cost to the council was to be $8 million including earthquake strengthening for the building. 220,000 visitors a year were expected. A feasibility study by Deloittes assessed the economic benefit to Northland as $3.5 million per year. The Yes Whangarei campaign estimated the effective cost per household via rates to be $6.70 per year over 10 years. This per-household cost excluded the earthquake strengthening on the assumption it would be required regardless. The deputy Mayor, Phil Halse, said "Hundertwasser's legacy would put Whangārei on the map – not just in New Zealand but globally" whereas in Wellington the Wellington Regional Strategy study (2005) noted that Wellington had missed an opportunity to do just that for Wellington by not choosing the Hundertwasser and Gehry proposal for Te Papa. In 2014, however, newly elected councillors voted "That all previous motions and/or commitments on the Hundertwasser Art Centre be rescinded." The council then asked for further proposals to make that location iconic. The four proposals selected for further consideration included a revised proposal for the Hundertwasser Arts Centre (renamed Hundertwasser Wairau Māori Art Centre) by a newly formed trust called Prosper Northland. Under the new proposal Prosper Northland committed to finding all funding except for the earthquake strengthening. Whangārei District Council staff analysis stated that "Overall staff considers the HWMAC proposal to be about economic development while on balance the other three are more about enhancing Sense of Place and telling our story". A public meeting to present the HWMAC proposal was attended by over 1000 supporters.

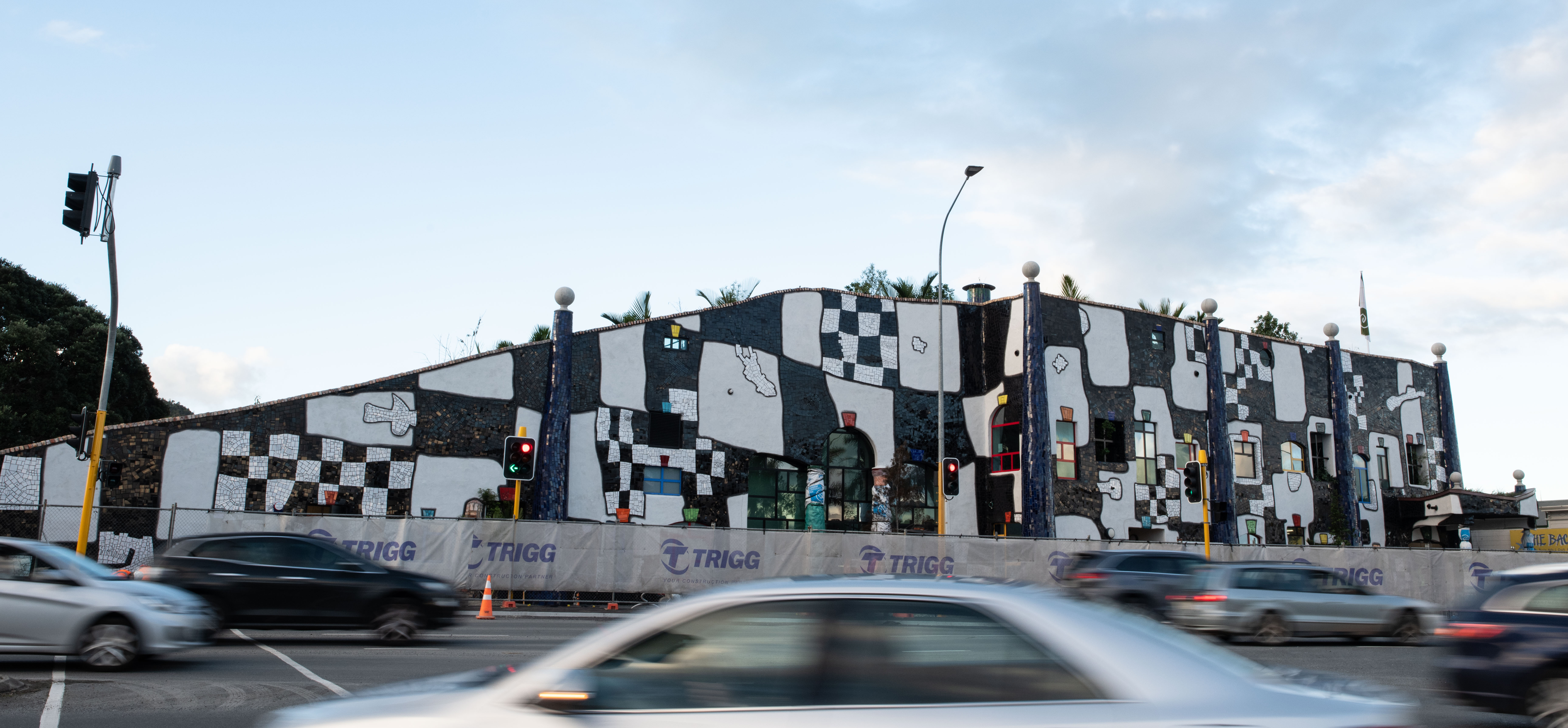
Hundertwasser Art Centre Whangarei Dent St View

Five councillors who voted against the more expensive HAC proposal moved to reject the HWMAC proposal. The motion was voted down at an extraordinary meeting of the Whangārei District Council on 12 November 2014 with only five councillors voting in favour. A counter-motion by the major to proceed with the HMWAC proposal and the Harbourside proposal, with a goal to have both, was also rejected. A final motion was passed that a binding referendum should be held in March. The New Zealand Herald said, "Last week it was decided, reluctantly, to hold a referendum on the proposal. To scrap the plan would be a loss not just for those supporting it now but for generations to come. At present there is no reason whatsoever for visitors to stop in Whangārei. With the Hundertwasser Arts Centre, there would be."

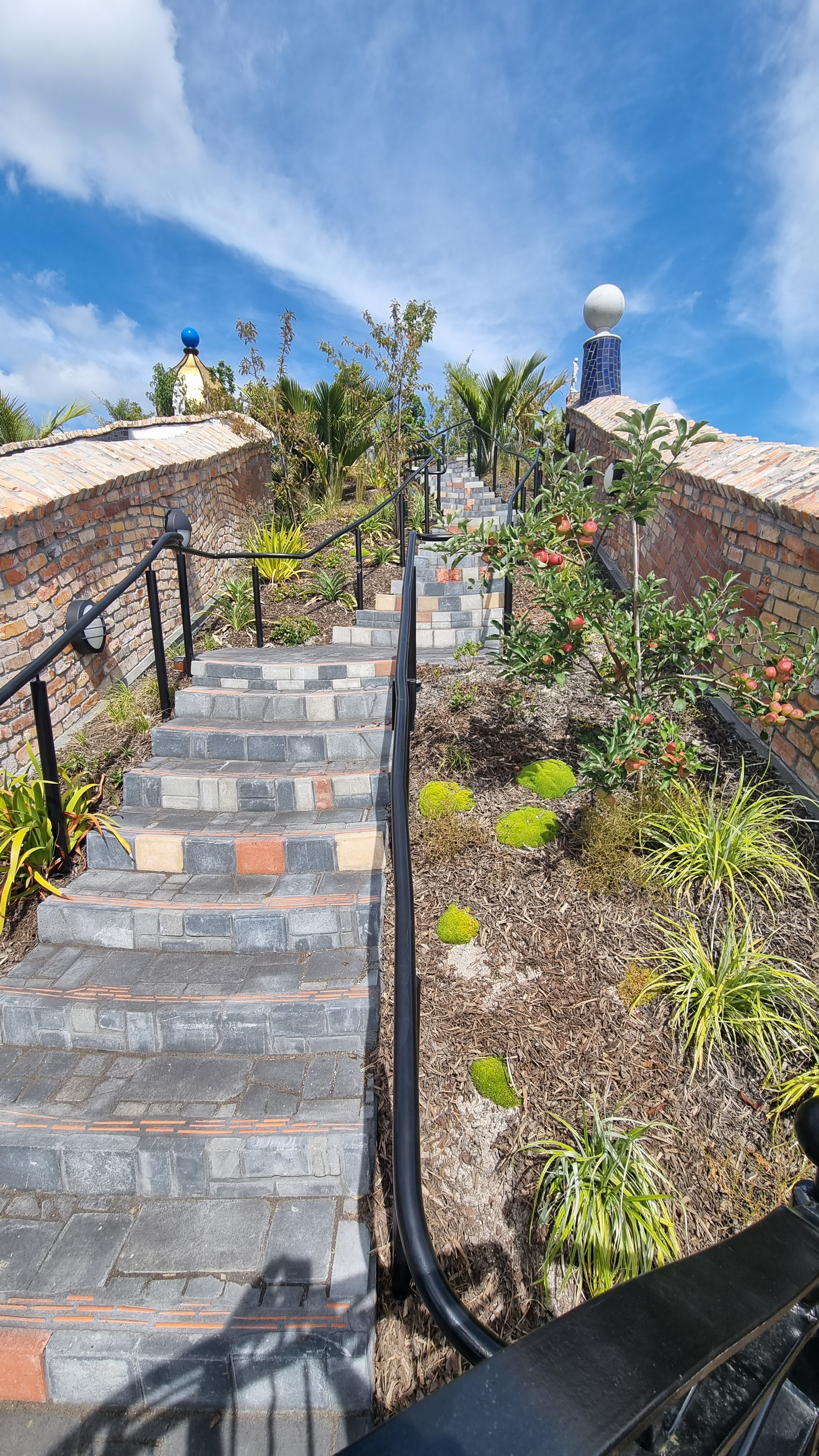
Hundertwasser Art Centre stair garden

In May–June 2015 a referendum was held to determine whether to go ahead. Options presented were to build a Hundertwasser Art Centre with Wairau Māori Gallery in the former Northland Harbour Board building, or a maritime museum, or to demolish the building. Prime Minister John Key supported the project and indicated he thought Tourism New Zealand should assist with funding. A majority voted for the Hundertwasser proposal in the referendum, according to the preliminary result announced after voting closed on 5 June. The local Northern Advocate newspaper reported there were 13,726 votes for the Hundertwasser proposal, 7,876 votes to demolish the building, and 5,478 votes for a maritime museum. The HWMAC received 51% of the vote, with the demolition option receiving 29% and 20% voting for the Harbourside option. Some local media called it a landslide victory. Voter turnout was 49%, which is comparable to voter turnout of 48% at the previous local body election in Whangarei.

== Awards ==
- Silver Qualmark – 20 February 2022 – New Zealand second place tourism award for quality and sustainability.
- Gold Qualmark – 2023 – New Zealand top place tourism award for quality and sustainability (alongside Whangārei Art Museum).
