= Kuchlbauer Brewery =

Traditional brewery in Abensberg, Bavaria, Germany

Brauerei zum Kuchlbauer
- Type: GmbH & Co KG
- Location: 93326 Abensberg, Bavaria, Germany Romerstrasse 5-9
- Opened: 1300
- Key people: Leonhard Salleck (manager)
- Annual production volume: 110,000 hectolitres (94,000 US bbl)
- Website: www.kuchlbauer.de/en

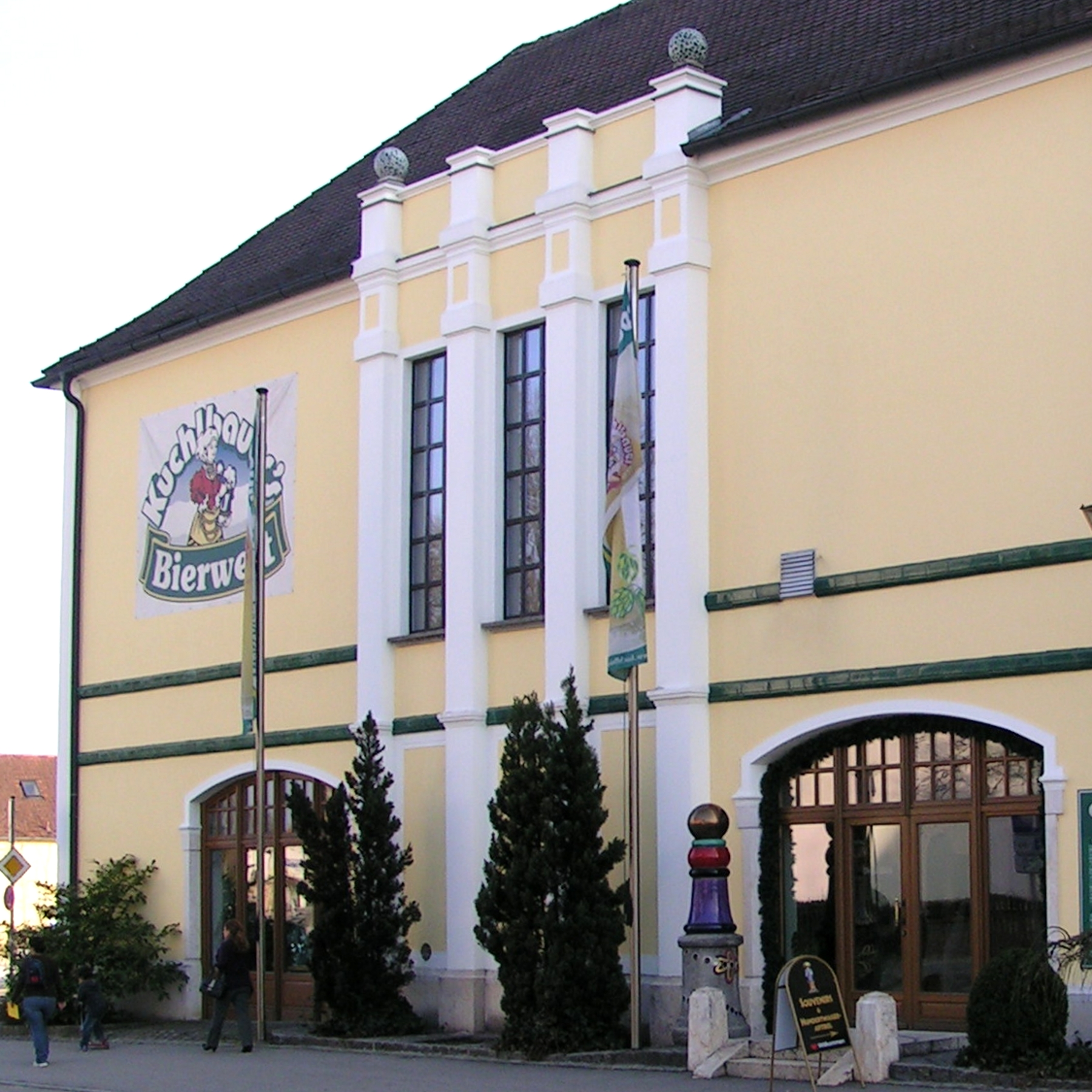
Brewery building

Kuchlbauer Brewery is a traditional brewery in Abensberg, Bavaria federal state, Germany. It was founded in 1300 and the production is focused on the wheat beers, with annual volume about 110,000 hectoliters.

== See also ==
- Kuchlbauer Tower
- List of oldest companies
