= Kuchlbauer Tower =

Observation tower in Abensberg, Lower Bavaria, Germany

Coordinates: 48°49′1.2″N 11°50′32.2″E

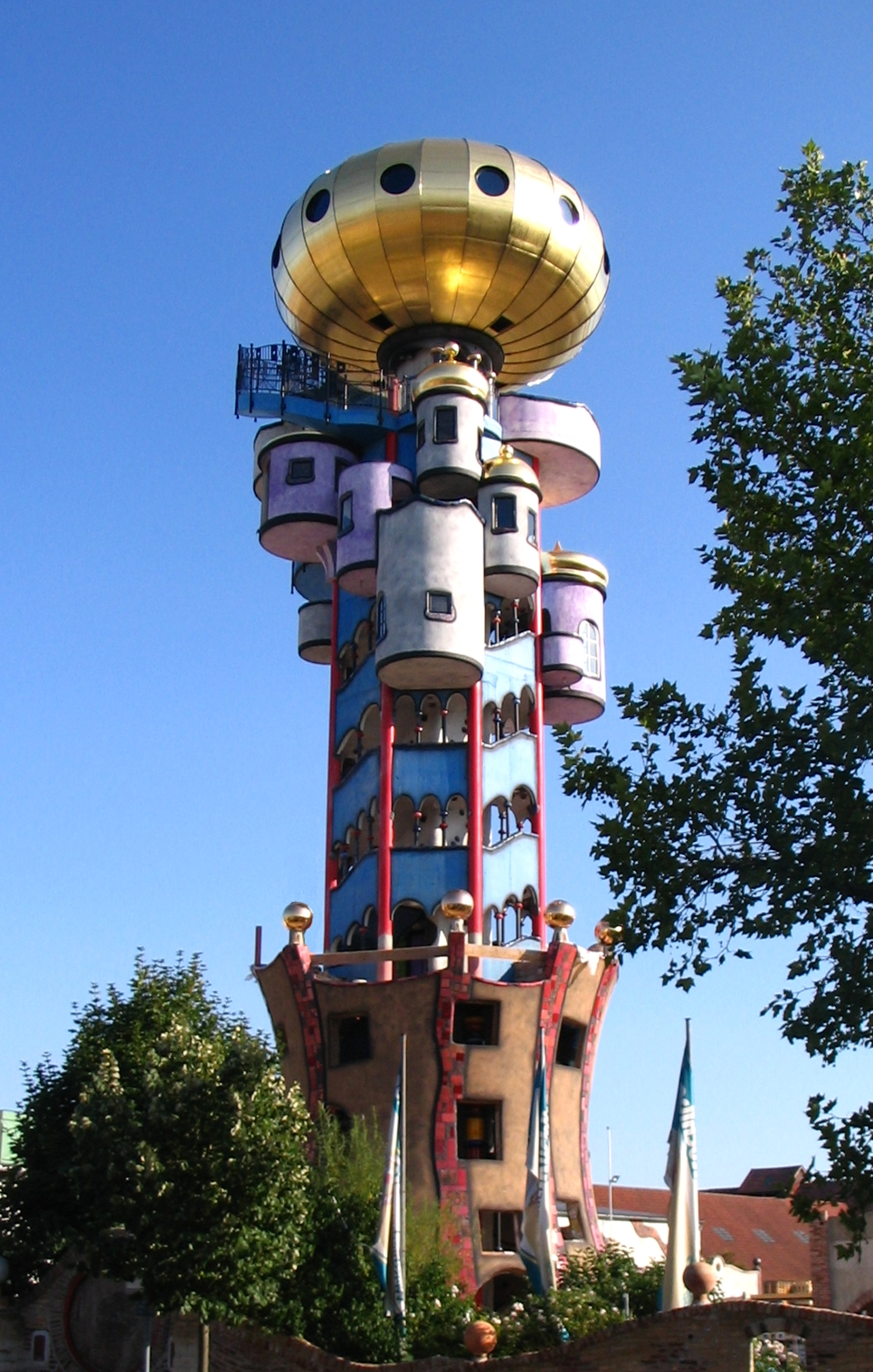
Kuchlbauer-Turm

The Kuchlbauer Tower (German: Kuchlbauer-Turm) is an observation tower designed by Austrian architect Friedensreich Hundertwasser on the grounds of the Kuchlbauer brewery in Abensberg, a town in Lower Bavaria.

== History ==
The 34.19 meter tower was conceived and designed by Friedensreich Hundertwasser, who died in the year 2000 during the tower's planning phase. The tower was completed after Hundertwasser's death under the direction of Leonhard Salleck, owner of the brewery, with architect Peter Pelikan overseeing construction.

The cornerstone was laid on 23 April 2007. On 8 August 2008 the gold-plated observation ball, with a 10-meter diameter and a weight of 12 metric tons, was installed on top of the tower. The tower was opened to visitors in January 2010.

== Museum ==
Inside the tower is a collection of 4200 Weissbier glasses, along with an exhibition on the brewing process and an explanation of the Bavarian Purity Law.
