= Hundertwasserhaus Plochingen =

House in Plochingen, Germany

Coordinates: 48.709985°N 9.415975°E

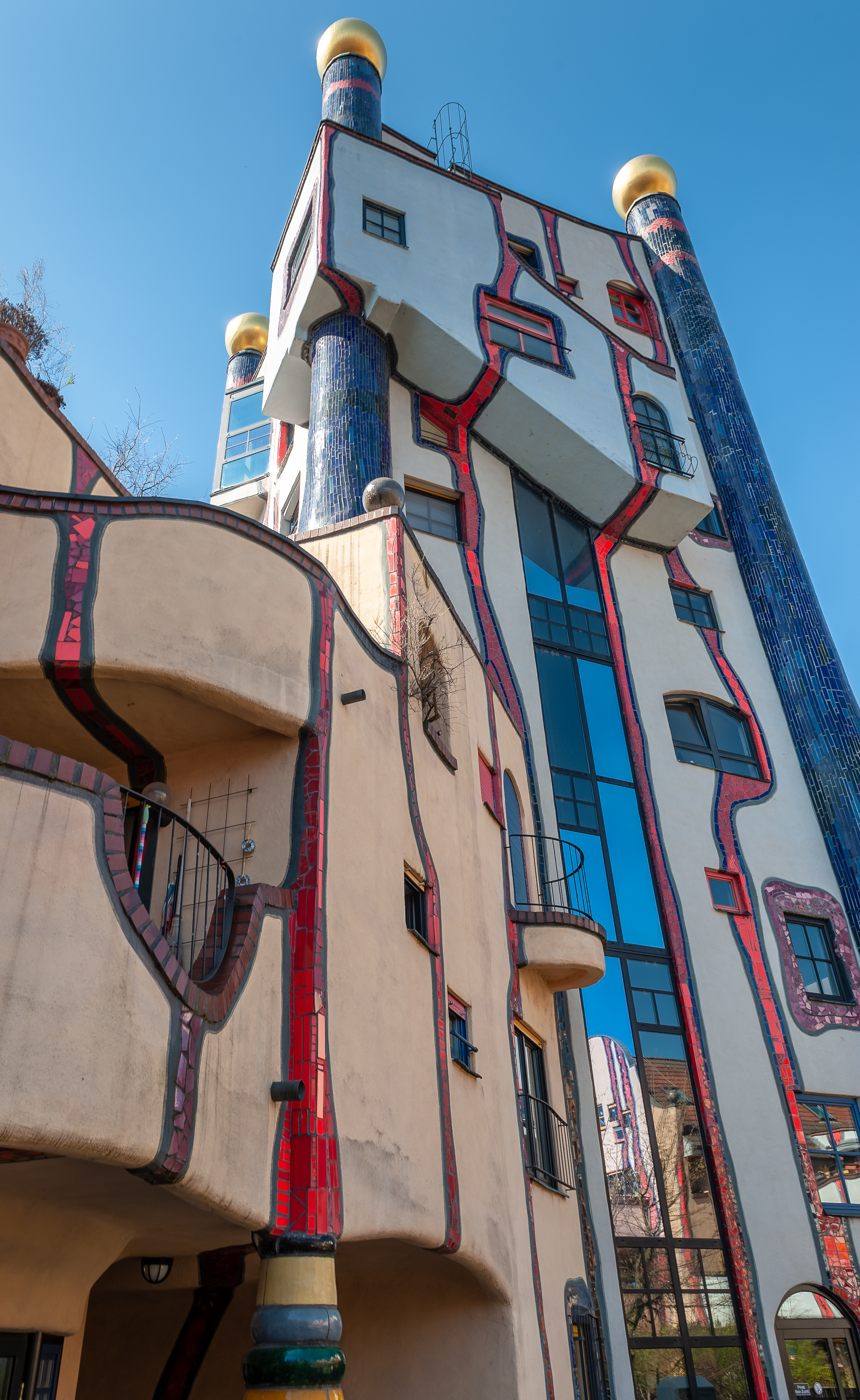

The Hundertwasser House Plochingen "Living under the Raintower" is a house designed by the Austrian artist Friedensreich Hundertwasser (1928–2000) co-designed building in the German City Plochingen. It was built from November 1991 to August 1994.

== Prehistory, planning, construction ==
In the 1980s, the centre of Plochingen was redesigned in terms of urban planning. A historical core was created on the market square. The Marktstraße became a pedestrian zone. However, there was a lack of parking spaces, apartments and space for trade and commerce. The Neckarstraße and Schorndorferstraße areas were still lying fallow. Until the early 1990s, the concept of a closed area with an inner courtyard was developed for this area; the inner courtyard was to be public.

With the help of contacts via the Austrian twin town Zwettl, Friedensreich Hundertwasser was won over for the design of the inner courtyard. He also designed the rain tower with the four gold spheres. The "Rain Tower" is 33 meters high.

A residential and commercial building with 6,800 m^{2} living space, 5,500 m^{2} commercial floor space and a two-storey underground car park was built under a private developer.

== Pictures ==
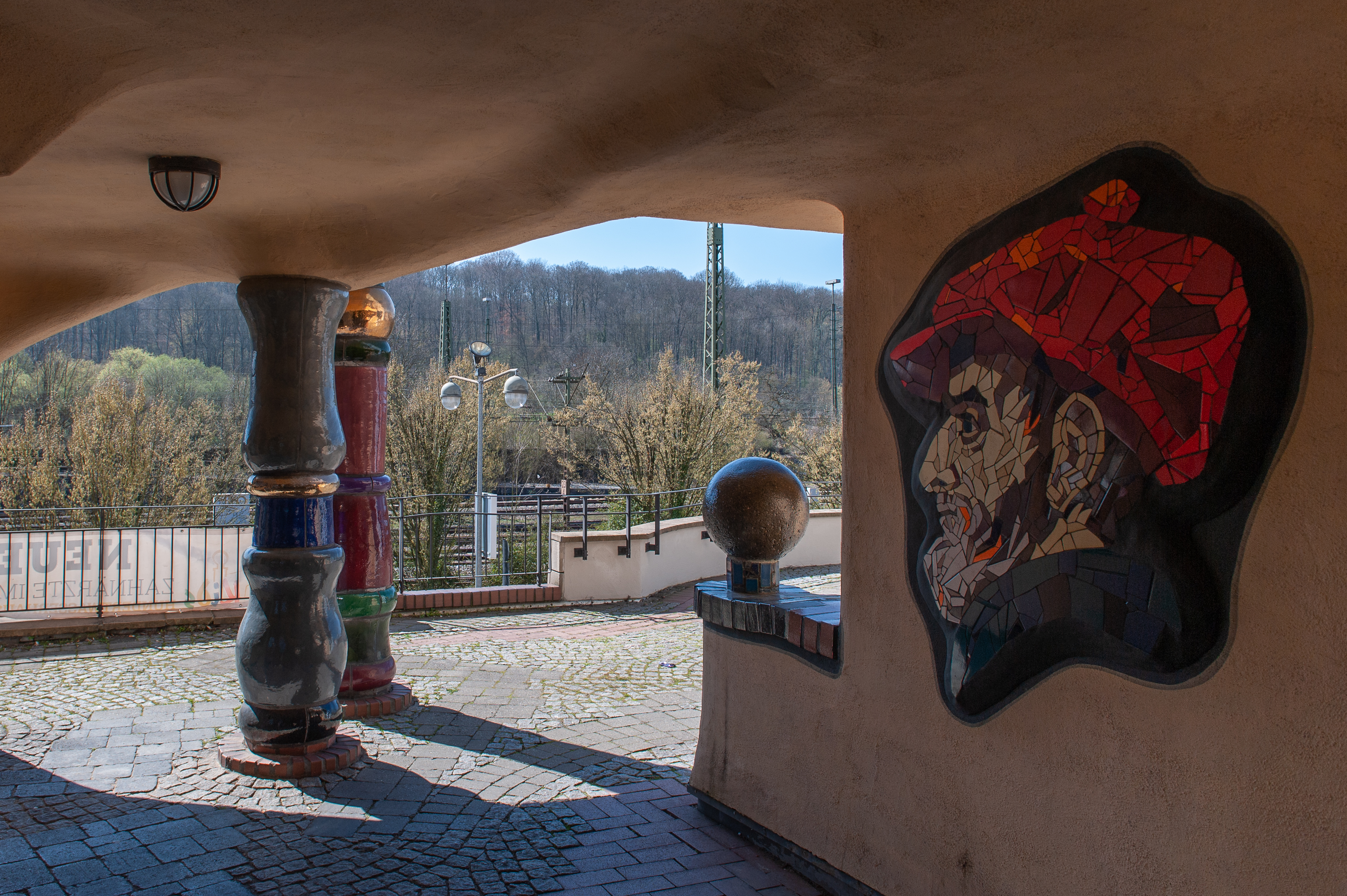
Passage to the inner courtyard with portrait of the artist

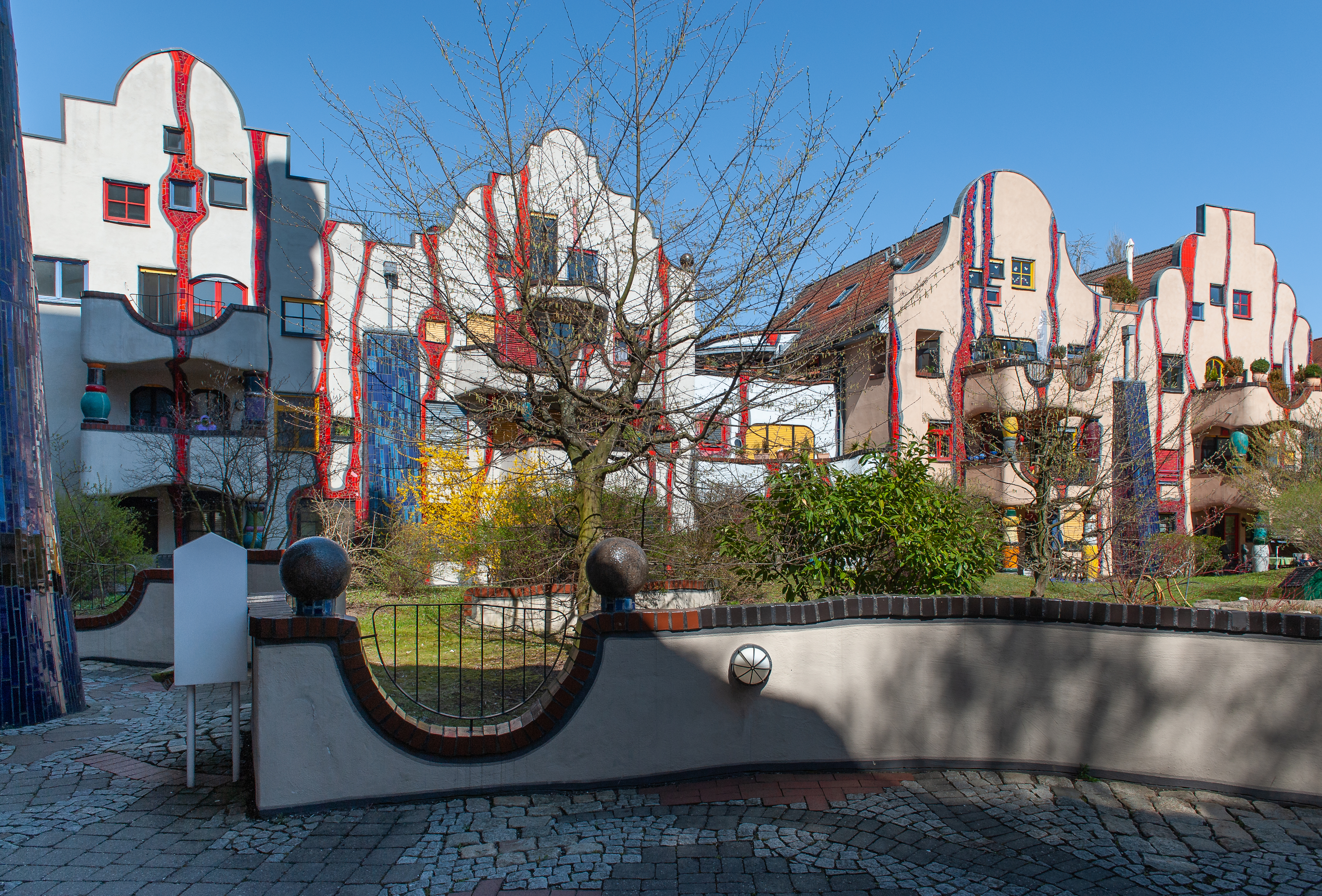
Courtyard

== Literature ==
- Rombach, Theo; Springmann, Heinz M. (1994), Der Regenturm von Friedensreich Hundertwasser. Ein Wohn- und Geschäftshaus in Plochingen, Plochingen: Herba-Verlag, ISBN 3-87330-102-4
- Hundertwasser. Hundertwasser Architecture: For a More Human Architecture in Harmony with Nature. Köln [etc.]: Taschen, 1997. ISBN 9783822885642
