= Hundertwasser Toilets =

Public toilet in Kawakawa, New Zealand

Coordinates: 35°22′47.84″S 174°4′1.12″E

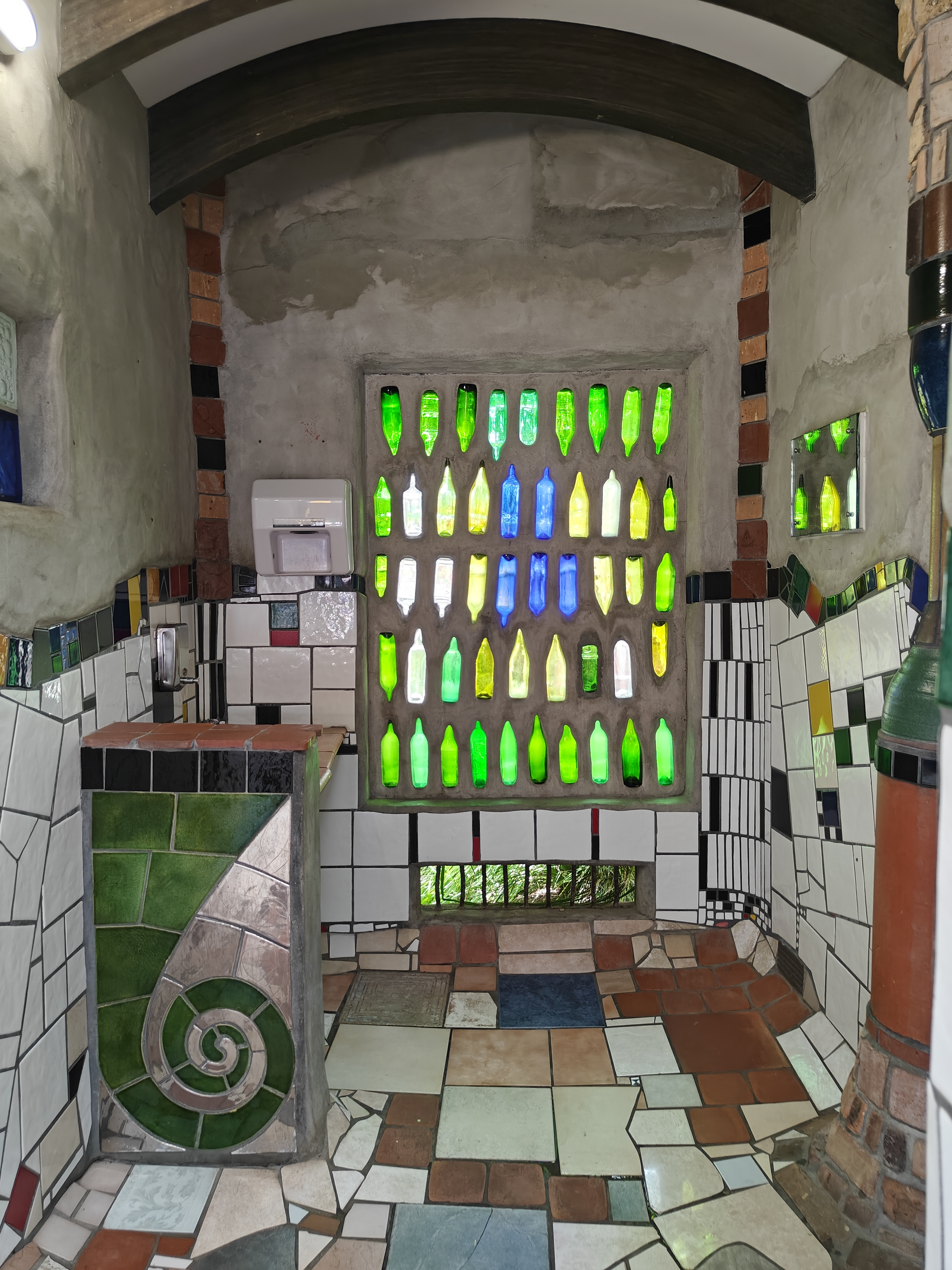
The back wall of the women's toilets

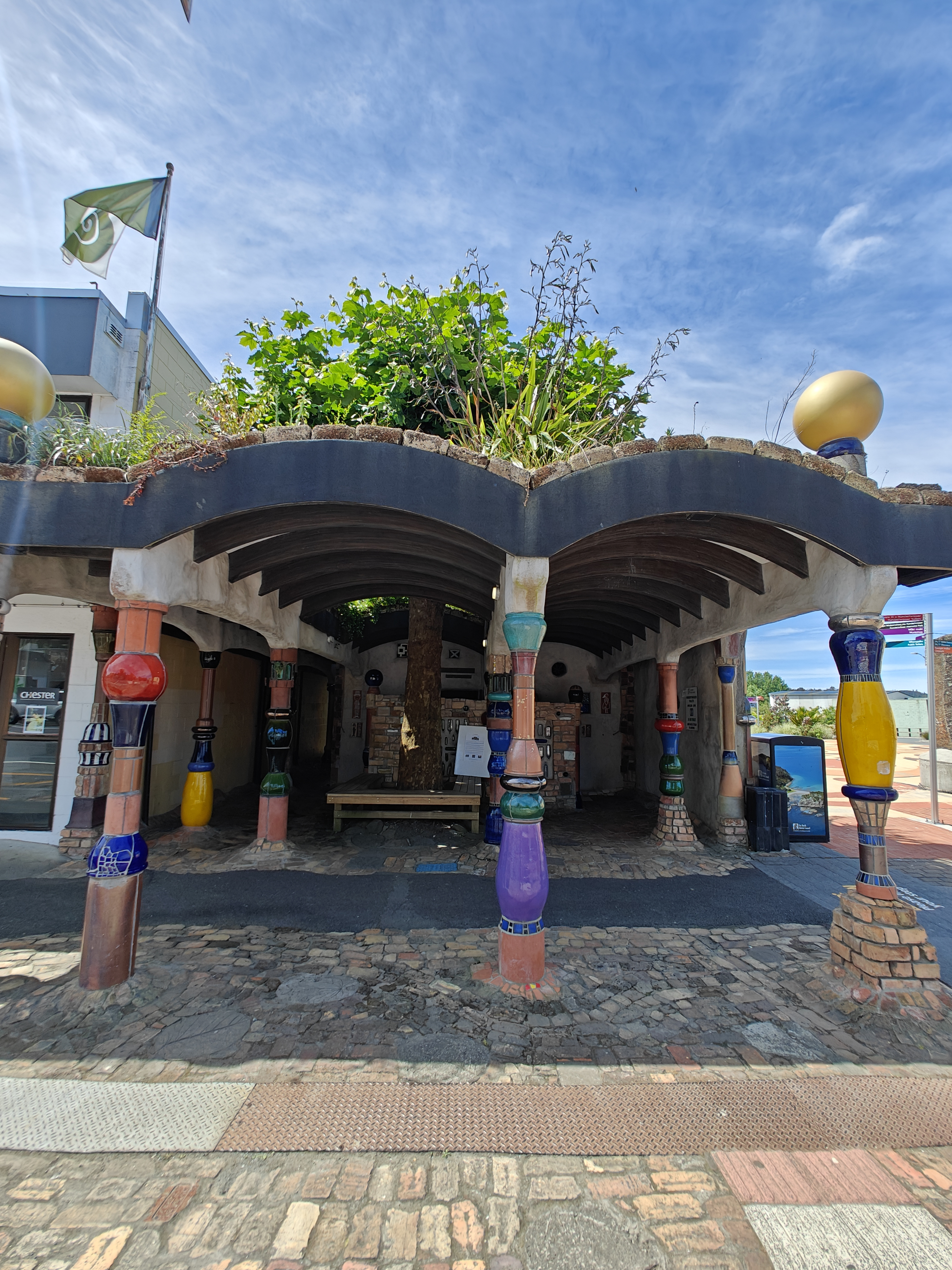
The view of the public toilets from the curb, 2023. The Hundertwasser koru flag is flying above the building.

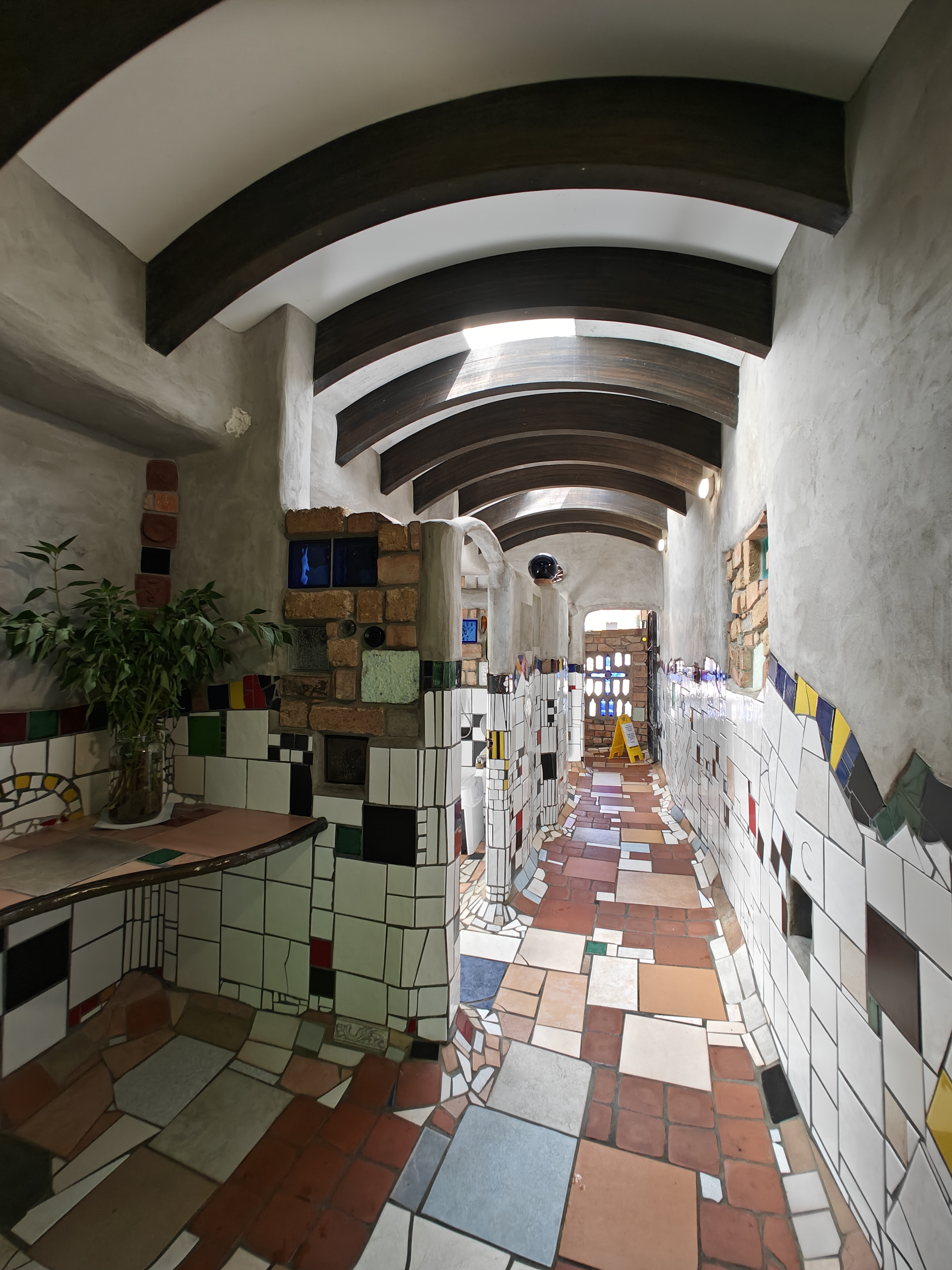
The hallway inside the women's toilets

The Hundertwasser Toilets is a public toilet located at 60 Gillies Street, the main street of the town of Kawakawa in northern New Zealand. The structure was completed in 1999 and named after the architect and visual artist Friedensreich Hundertwasser, who conceived and designed the project. It is one of the few toilet blocks worldwide seen both as an international work of art and a tourist attraction in its own right.

== Description ==
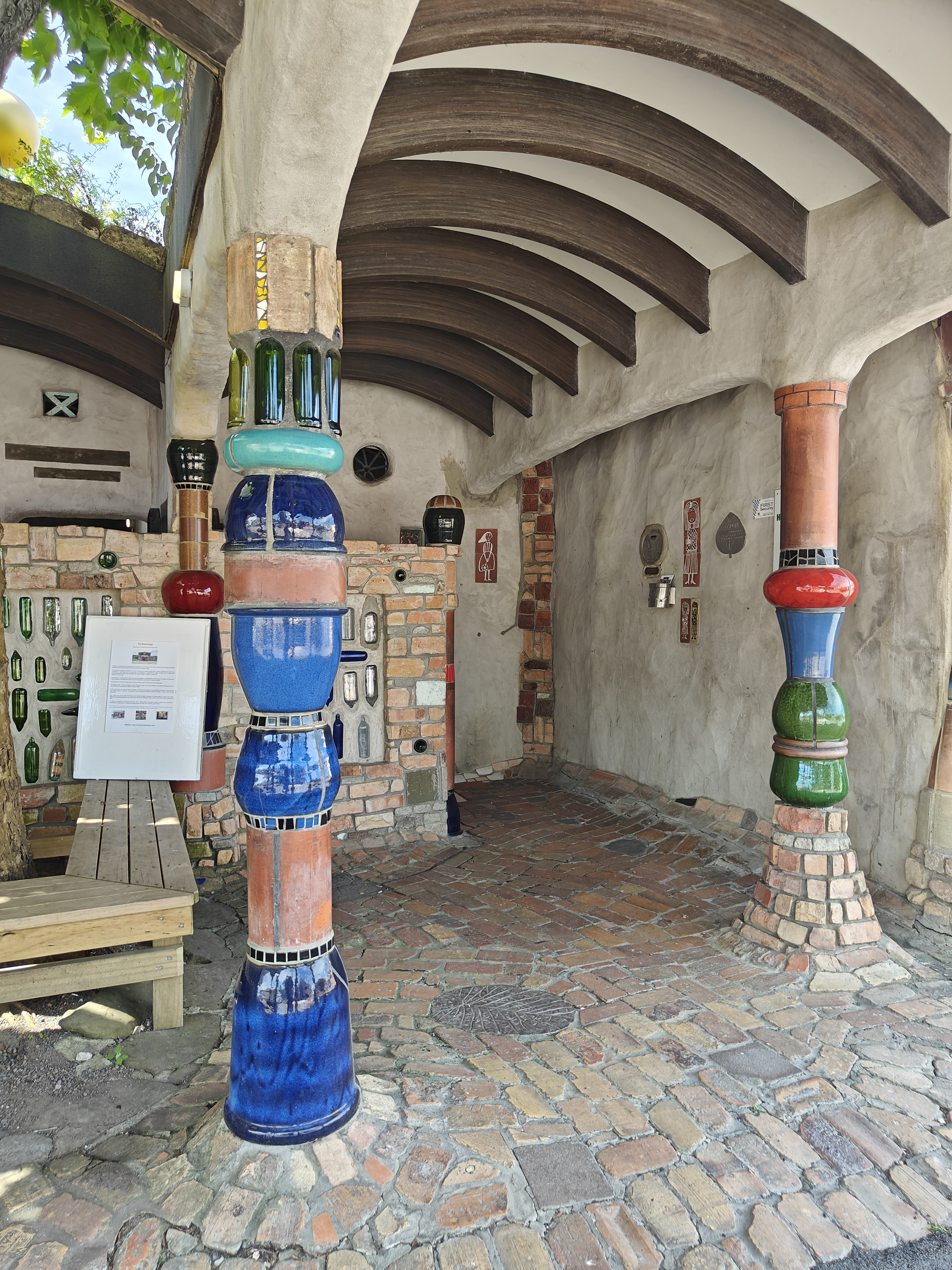
The entryway to the women's stalls

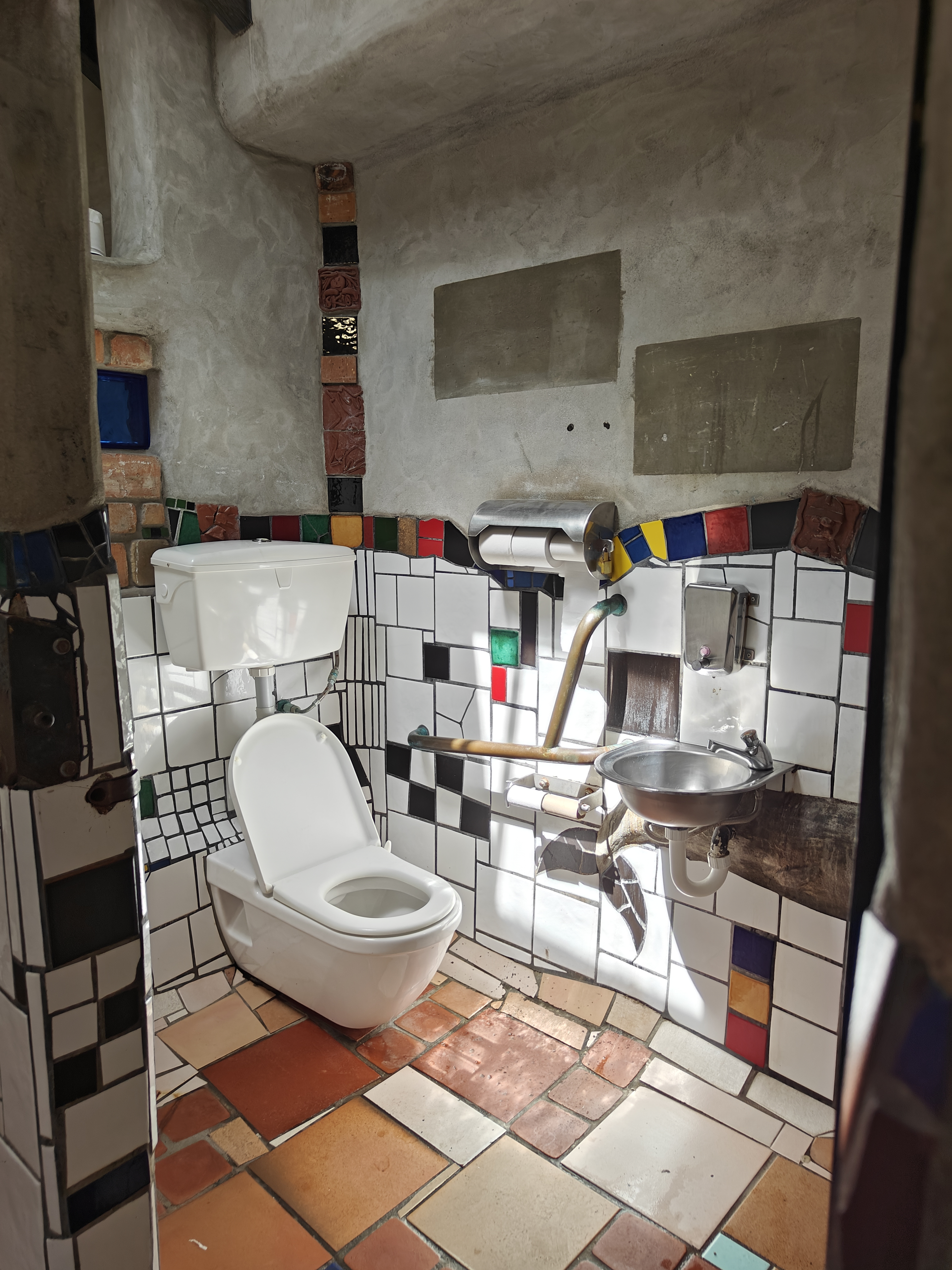
Inside a stall, with its irregular and very colourful ceramic tiles along the wall and floor

The toilet facility was designed by the reclusive Austrian and New Zealand artist Friedensreich Hundertwasser, who lived near Kawakawa from 1975 until his death in 2000, aged 71. The decorative toilet block is the only project designed by Hundertwasser in the Southern Hemisphere and the last project completed within the artist's lifetime. The style is typical Hundertwasser, with wavy lines, irregular ceramic tiles, integrated small sculptures, coloured glass and a live tree incorporated into the architecture.

Recycled materials, including the community's spent glass bottles and bricks from a former Bank of New Zealand branch, were used throughout. Hundertwasser requested that any vegetation removed for construction should be replanted on the building's green roof. The toilet was opened in 1999. Functionally, it does not differ from other ordinary public toilets. There are separate men's and women's areas, but both sides are sometimes viewed by the more curious visitor after giving suitable advance warning.

== Tourism ==
The Hundertwasser Toilets are considered the main attraction of Kawakawa and the most photographed toilet of New Zealand. The bus-loads of tourists who view the toilets far outnumber the individuals who visit simply to use the facility.

In October 2020, Te Hononga Hundertwasser Memorial Park was opened by prime minister Jacinda Ardern. The complex is designed to celebrate both Hundertwasser and local Māori heritage, and incorporates a library, visitor information centre, cafe, freedom camping facilities and other amenities. It was planned and developed by a community trust led by Noma Shepherd, a community leader who had previously worked as Hundertwasser's farm manager.

== See also ==
- List of buildings by Friedensreich Hundertwasser
