= Bad Blumau =

- Municipality
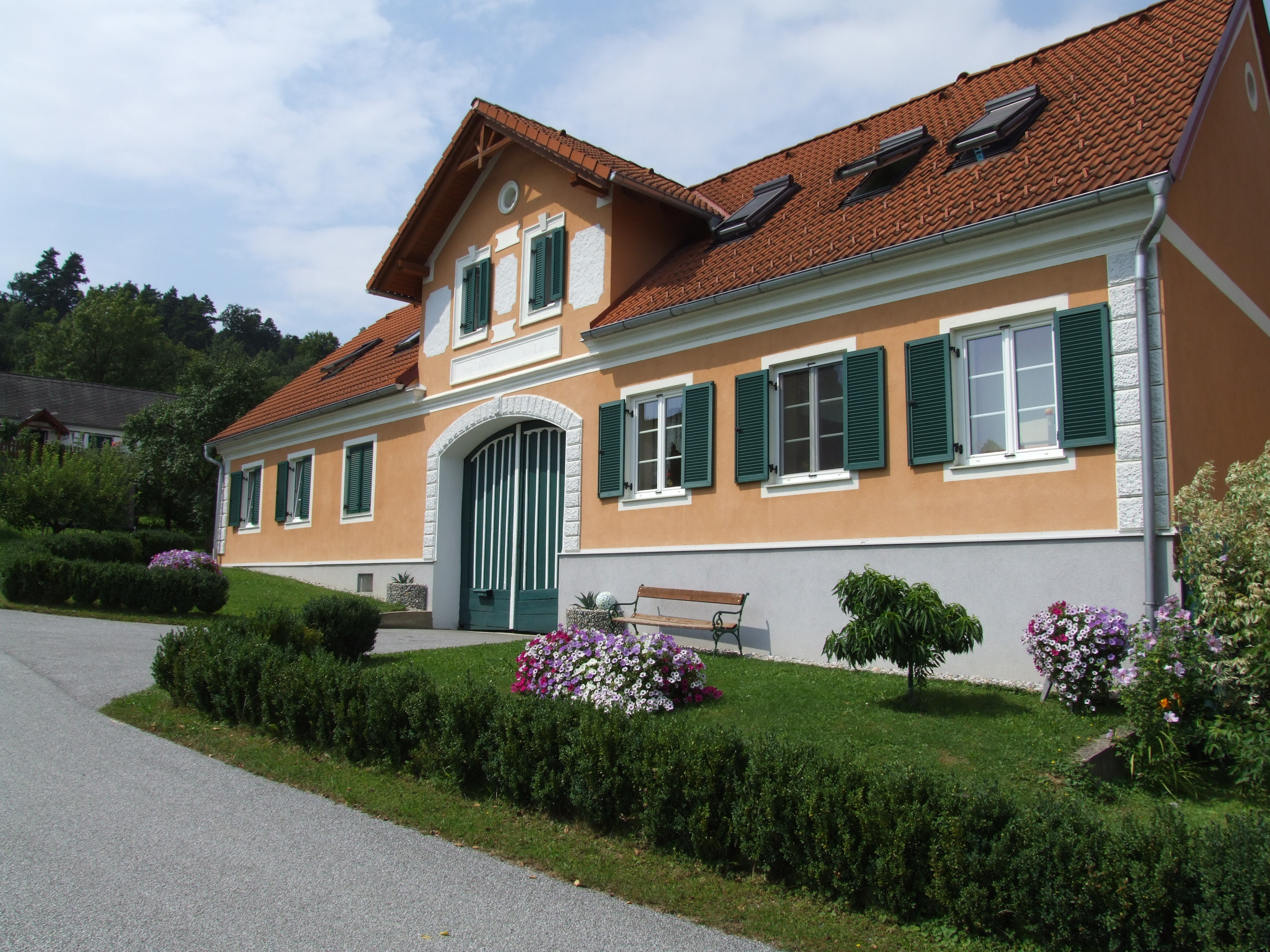
- Homestead in Bad Blumau

- Coat of arms

- Location within Austria
- Coordinates: 47°07′00″N 16°03′00″E
- Country: Austria
- State: Styria
- District: Hartberg-Fürstenfeld

Government
  - Mayor: Manfred Schaffer (ÖVP)

Area
  - Total: 37.33 km^{2} (14.41 sq mi)
- Elevation: 284 m (932 ft)

Population (2018-01-01)
  - Total: 1,641
  - Density: 43.96/km^{2} (113.9/sq mi)
- Time zone: UTC+1 (CET)
  - Summer (DST): UTC+2 (CEST)
- Postal code: 8283
- Area code: 03383
- Vehicle registration: FF
- Website: www.bad-blumau. steiermark.at

Bad Blumau is a municipality and spa town in the district of Hartberg-Fürstenfeld in Styria, Austria.

It has a large complex at the hot springs designed by architect Friedensreich Hundertwasser.
