= KunstHausWien =

Museum in Vienna, Austria

Coordinates: 48°12′39.3″N 16°23′36.2″E

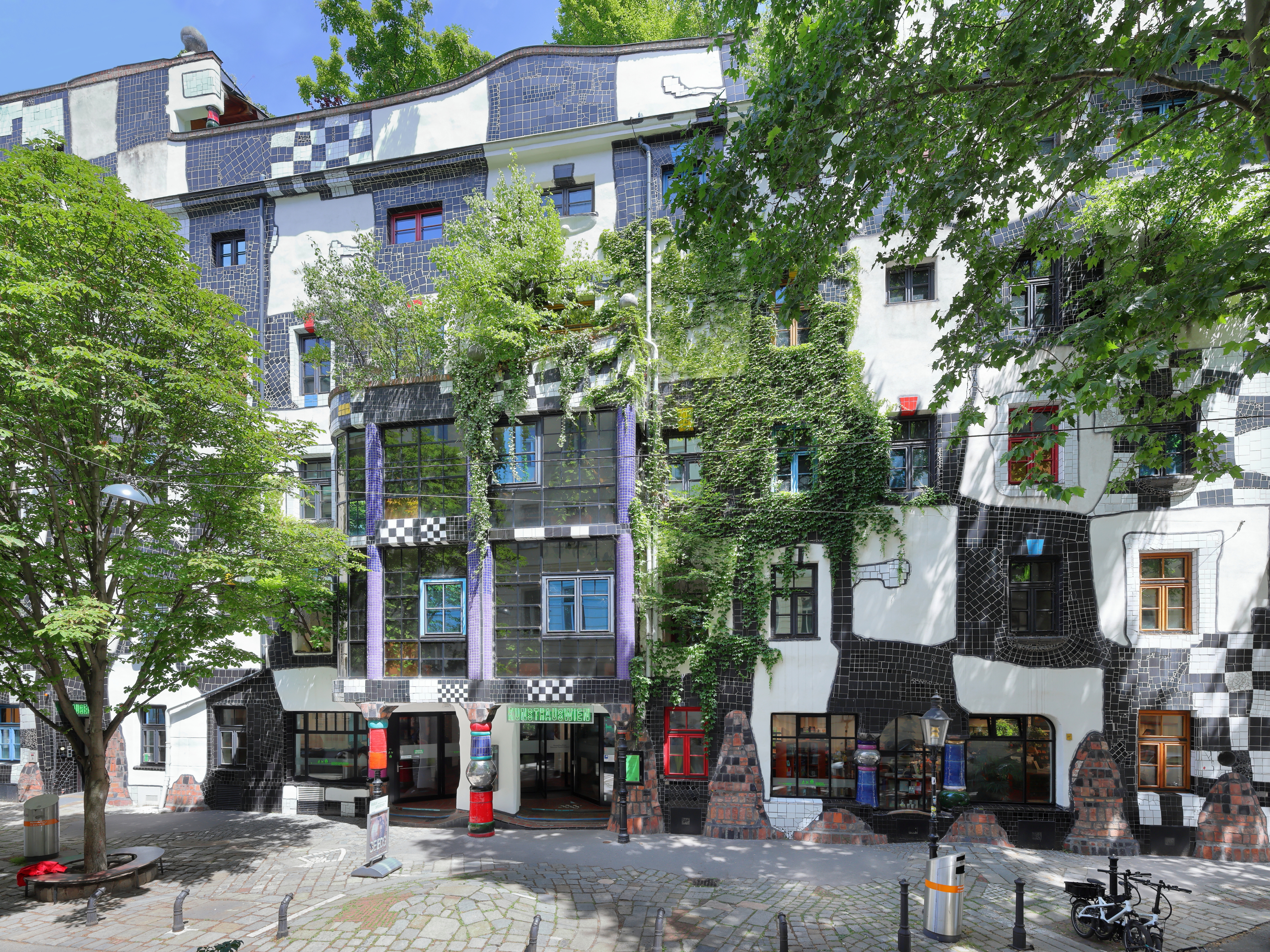
Street facade and entrance

The KunstHausWien is a museum in Vienna, designed by the artist Friedensreich Hundertwasser. This museum in the Landstraße district houses the world's only permanent exhibition of Hundertwasser's works, and also hosts regular temporary exhibitions of other artists. The KunstHausWien operates as a private business and does not receive any government aid. In 2009 the KunstHausWien received 174,000 visitors.

== The museum ==
The museum was created through the renovation of the 1892 building which housed the Thonet furniture factory (creator of the iconic bistro chair), in a style commensurate with Hundertwasser's art. It stands less than half a mile from the Hundertwasserhaus, a municipally owned apartment block also designed by Hundertwasser and completed in 1986. The renovation was planned by Hundertwasser himself and carried out from 1989 to 1991 with sponsorship from BAWAG P.S.K. The museum was opened in April 1991. The KunstHausWien has a total exhibition area of 4,000 square meters. The two lower floors house the permanent exhibits. Temporary international exhibitions are held on the third and fourth floors.

The entire building is designed in typical Hundertwasser style, with wavy, undulating floors and a notable lack of straight lines. Bright, glaring colours are used throughout, and foliage abounds. There is a fountain in the foyer, and a restaurant with abundant plant life reminiscent of a winter garden. An unevenly winding staircase leads to the main part of the exhibition on the upper floors. To keep the rooms flooded with daylight, Hundertwasser, who was said to be fond of sunlight and therefore windows too, had a glass frontage built in front of the facade.

The museum was built in a traditional manner, but decorated with enamelled, checkerboard mosaics on the facade and adjacent sections. In contrast to Antoni Gaudí, Hundertwasser used symmetrical mosaic stones, carefully arranged. The size of each stone is likewise not accidental, which is rare for building-mounted mosaics that are not industrially manufactured. The mosaics cover only certain (non-load-bearing) parts of the surface, and contribute to the trademark features of the building: the incorporation of nearly every part of the facade into an overall picture, and the very deliberate concealment of the boundaries between floors.

In 2003 Hunderwasser's colleague and co-author professor Joseph Krawina initiated a lawsuit against the museum board, claiming violation of his rights to jointly created art. The national Supreme Civil Court (OGH) issued an injunction in favor of Krawina and, according to 2003 publications, both parties were advised to resolve the dispute out of court.

== See also ==
- List of single-artist museums

== Sources ==
- Restany, Pierre (2001). Hundertwasser: The Painter-King with the Five Skins. Taschen. ISBN 3-8228-5984-2.
