= Friedensreich Hundertwasser =

Austrian-born visual artist (1928–2000)

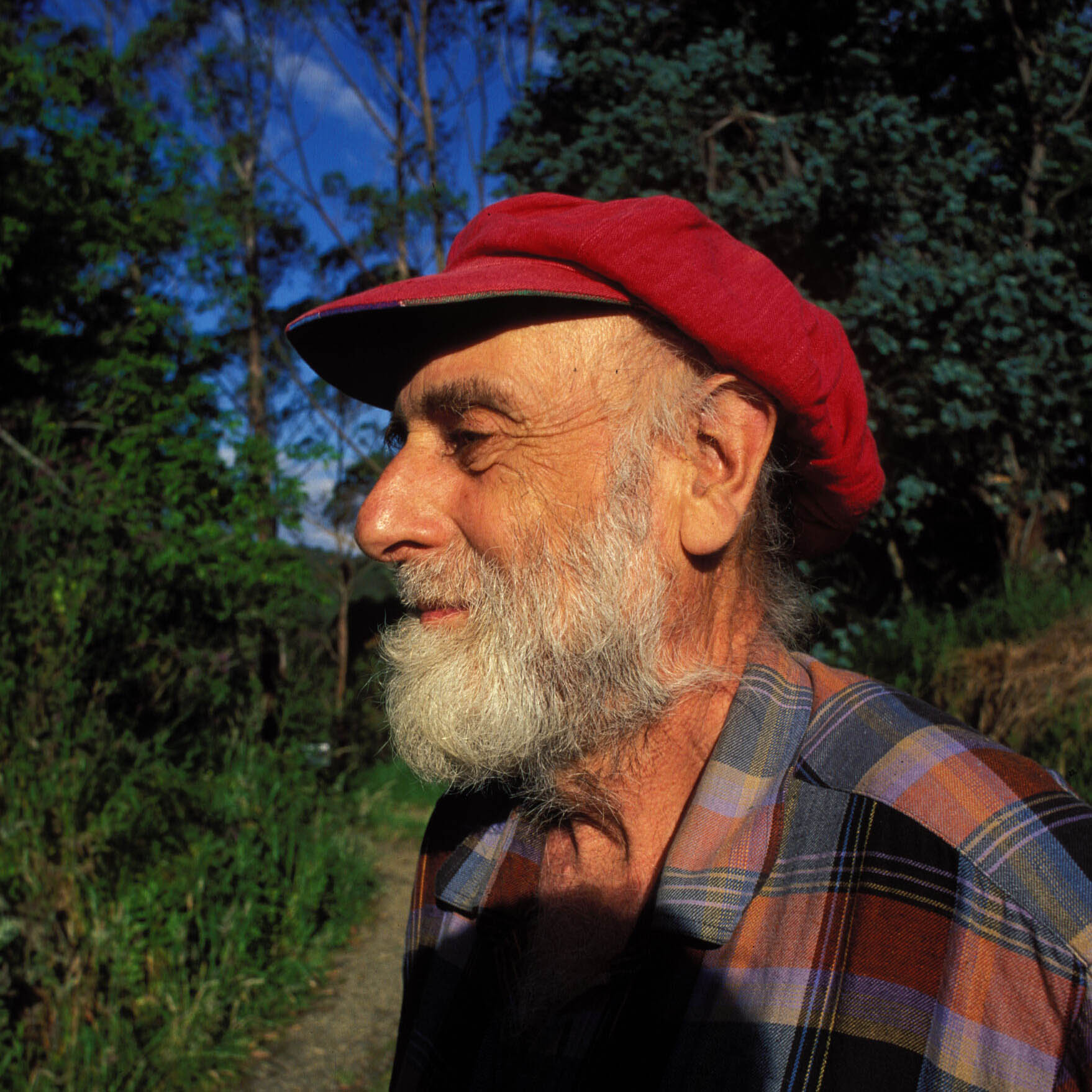
- Hundertwasser in his second homeland New Zealand in 1998
- Born: Friedrich Stowasser; 15 December 1928; Vienna, First Republic of Austria
- Died: 19 February 2000 (aged 71); Pacific Ocean, aboard the Queen Elizabeth 2
- Known for: Art; architecture; writing
- Notable work: Hundertwasserhaus; Waldspirale; KunstHausWien
- Movement: Modern art

Friedrich Stowasser (15 December 1928 – 19 February 2000), better known by his pseudonym Friedensreich Regentag Dunkelbunt Hundertwasser (Austrian German: [ˈfriːdn̩sraɪç ˈreːɡn̩taːɡ ˈdʊŋkl̩bʊnt ˈhʊndɐtˌvasɐ]), was an Austrian visual artist, architect and activist.

Hundertwasser stood out as an opponent of "a straight line" and any standardisation, expressing this concept in the field of building design. He was also a vocal environmentalist who integrated nature in his architectural designs. His best known work is the Hundertwasserhaus in Vienna, which has become a notable place of interest in the Austrian capital, characterised by imaginative vitality and uniqueness. He also designed KunstHausWien, an art gallery which houses a permanent collection of his works, and dozens of other buildings. He emigrated to the Far North of New Zealand in the 1970s, where he lived and worked for most of the rest of his life.

== Biography ==
During the Nazi era, Hundertwasser and his mother Elsa, who were Jewish, avoided persecution by posing as Christians, a credible ruse as Hundertwasser's father had been a Catholic. Hundertwasser was baptized as a Catholic in 1935. To remain inconspicuous, Hundertwasser also joined the Hitler Youth. He has identified himself as "half-Jewish".

Hundertwasser developed artistic skills early on. After the war, he spent three months at the Academy of Fine Arts in Vienna. At this time, he began to sign his art as Hundertwasser instead of Stowasser. He left to travel, using a small set of paints he carried at all times to sketch anything that caught his eye. In Florence, he met the young French painter René Brô for the first time and they became lifelong friends. Hundertwasser's first commercial painting success was in 1952–53 with an exhibition in Vienna.

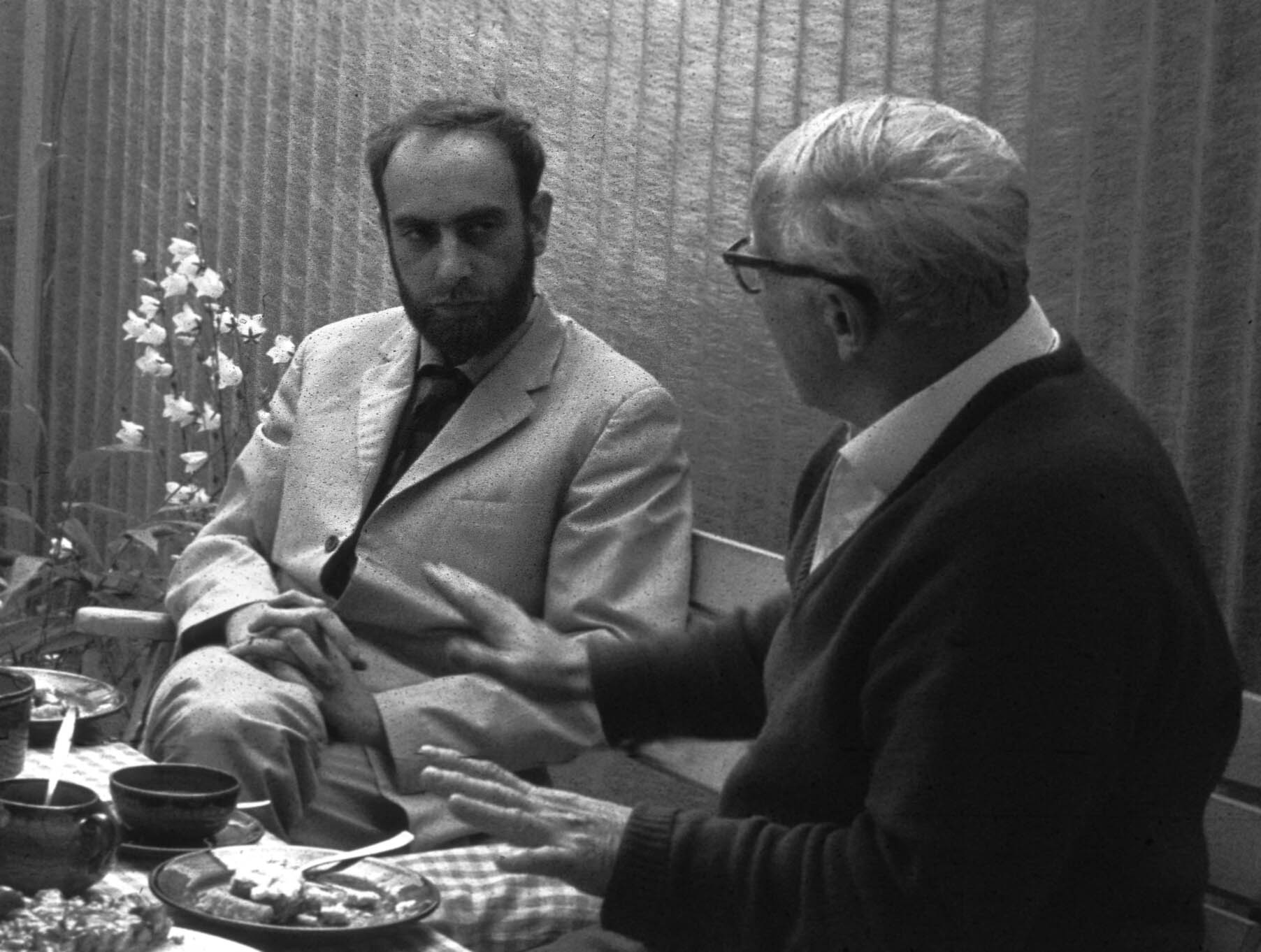
Hundertwasser (left) in 1965

His adopted surname is based on the translation of "sto" (the Slavic word for "(one) hundred") into German. The name Friedensreich has a double meaning as "Peace-realm" or "Peace-rich" (in the sense of "peaceful"). Therefore, his name Friedensreich Hundertwasser translates directly into English as "Peace-Realm Hundred-Water". The other names he chose for himself, Regentag and Dunkelbunt, translate to "Rainy day" and "Darkly multi-coloured".

In the early 1950s, he entered the field of architecture. Hundertwasser also worked in the field of applied art, creating flags, stamps, coins, and posters. His most famous flag is his koru flag (designed in 1983), as well as several postage stamps for the Austrian Post Office. He also designed stamps for Cape Verde and for the United Nations postal administration in Geneva on the occasion of the 35th anniversary of the Universal Declaration of Human Rights.

In 1957 Hundertwasser acquired a farm on the edge of Normandy. Hundertwasser married Herta Leitner in 1958 but they divorced two years later. He married again in 1962 to the Japanese artist Yuko Ikewada but she divorced him in 1966. By this time, he had gained a popular reputation for his art.

In 1964 Hundertwasser bought "Hahnsäge", a former saw mill, in the sparsely populated Lower Austria's Waldviertel. There, far from the hustle and bustle and surrounded by nature, he set up a new home.

He spent some time in the 1960s in the Tooro Kingdom in Uganda, Central Africa, where he painted a number of works and named them after the kingdom.

In 1972 Hundertwasser incorporated a stock company, the "Grüner Janura AG", in Switzerland; in 2008 it was renamed as "Namida AG". Hundertwasser managed his intellectual property rights through this company.

In the 1970s, Hundertwasser acquired several properties in the Bay of Islands in the far northern Te Tai Tokerau region of New Zealand, which include a total area of approximately 372 ha of the entire Kaurinui valley. There he realised his dream of living and working closely connected to nature. Beside other projects he designed the "Bottle House" there. He could live largely self-sufficiently using solar panels, a water wheel and a biological water purification plant. His first grass roof experiments took place there.

In 1979 Hundertwasser bought the vast historical garden Giardino Eden ('Garden of Eden') in Venice, including the Palazzo Villa delle Rose, from Alexandra of Yugoslavia via his Swiss company.

In 1980, Hundertwasser visited Washington D.C. to support activist Ralph Nader's efforts to oppose nuclear proliferation. Mayor Marion Barry declared 18 November to be Hundertwasser Day as a result. Hundertwasser planted trees in Judiciary Square and advocated on behalf of a co-op apartment owner who was taken to court for installing a bay window.

In 1982, Hundertwasser's only child, Heidi Trimmel, was born.

He died on 19 February 2000 on board Queen Elizabeth 2 in the Pacific Ocean, from a heart attack. According to his wish he was buried in harmony with nature on his land in New Zealand, in the Garden of the Happy Dead under a tulip tree.

== Artistic style and themes ==
Hundertwasser's koru flag, proposed in 1983 as a new New Zealand national flag based on a motif from Māori culture

Hundertwasser's Down Under Flag, proposal for a new Australian national flag with Uluru positioned to show "Australia holding the earth from down under"

Hundertwasser's original and unruly artistic vision expressed itself in pictorial art, environmentalism, philosophy, and design of facades, postage stamps, flags, and clothing (among other areas). The common themes in his work utilised bright colours, organic forms, a reconciliation of humans with nature, and a strong individualism, rejecting straight lines.

He remains sui generis, although his architectural work is comparable to Antoni Gaudí (1852–1926) in its use of biomorphic forms and the use of tile. He was also inspired by the art of the Vienna Secession, and by the Austrian painters Egon Schiele (1890–1918) and Gustav Klimt (1862–1918).

He was fascinated by spirals, and called straight lines "godless and immoral" and "something cowardly drawn with a rule, without thought or feeling" He called his theory of art "transautomatism", focusing on the experience of the viewer rather than the artist. This was encapsulated by his design of a new flag for New Zealand, which incorporated the image of the Koru a spiral shape based on the image of a new unfurling silver fern frond and symbolising new life, growth, strength and peace according to the Māori people.

=== Architecture ===
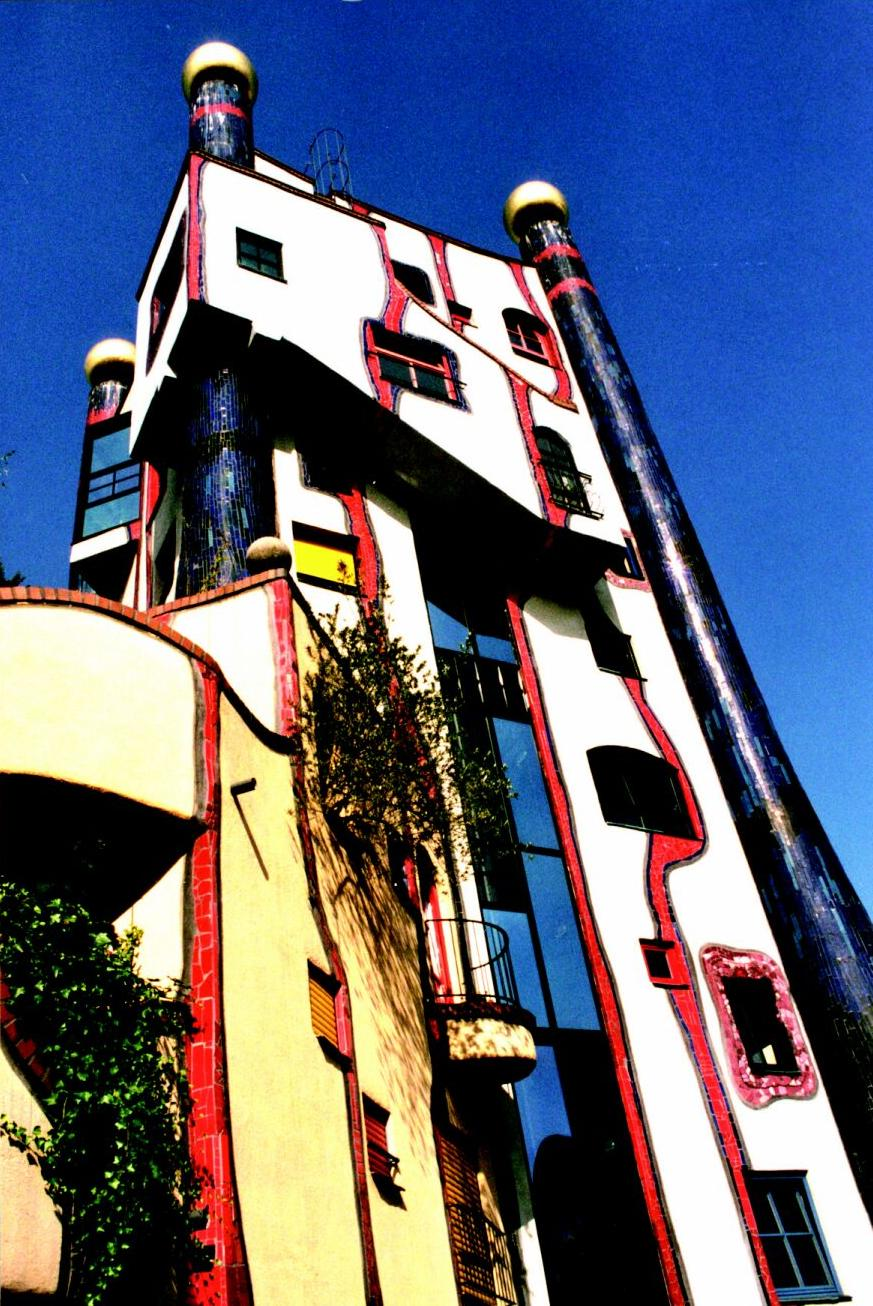
A typical Hundertwasser facade: the Hundertwasserhaus in Plochingen, Germany

Even though Hundertwasser first achieved notoriety for his boldly-coloured paintings, he is more widely known for his individual architectural designs. These designs use irregular forms, and incorporate natural features of the landscape. The Hundertwasserhaus apartment block in Vienna has undulating floors ("an uneven floor is a melody to the feet"), a roof covered with earth and grass, and large trees growing from inside the rooms, with limbs extending from windows. He took no payment for the design of Hundertwasserhaus, declaring that it was worth the investment to "prevent something ugly from going up in its place".

From the early 1950s he increasingly focused on architecture, advocating more just human and environmental friendly buildings. This began with manifestos, essays and demonstrations. For example, he read out his "Mouldiness Manifesto against Rationalism in Architecture" in 1958 on the occasion of an art and architectural event held at the Seckau Monastery. He rejected the straight line and the functional architecture. In Munich in 1967 he gave a lecture called "Speech in Nude for the Right to a Third Skin". His lecture "Loose from Loos, A Law Permitting Individual Buildings Alterations or Architecture-Boycott Manifesto", was given at the Concordia Press Club in Vienna in 1968.

In the Mouldiness Manifesto he first claimed the "Window Right": "A person in a rented apartment must be able to lean out of his window and scrape off the masonry within arm's reach. And he must be allowed to take a long brush and paint everything outside within arm's reach. So that it will be visible from afar to everyone in the street that someone lives there who is different from the imprisoned, enslaved, standardised man who lives next door." In his nude speeches of 1967 and 1968 Hundertwasser condemned the enslavement of humans by the sterile grid system of conventional architecture and by the output of mechanised industrial production. He rejected rationalism, the straight line and functional architecture.

For Hundertwasser, human misery was a result of the rational, sterile, monotonous architecture, built following the tradition of the Austrian architect Adolf Loos, author of the modernist manifesto Ornament and crime (1908). He called for a boycott of this type of architecture, and demanded instead creative freedom of building, and the right to create individual structures. In 1972 he published the manifesto Your window right — your tree duty. Planting trees in an urban environment was to become obligatory: "If man walks in nature's midst, then he is nature's guest and must learn to behave as a well-brought-up guest." Hundertwasser propagated a type of architecture in harmony with nature in his ecological commitment. He campaigned for the preservation of the natural habitat and demanded a life in accordance with the laws of nature. He wrote numerous manifestos, lectured and designed posters in favour of nature protection, including against nuclear power, to save the oceans and the whales and to protect the rainforest. He was also an advocate of composting toilets and the principle of constructed wetland. He perceived feces not as nauseous but as part of the cycle of nature. His beliefs are testified by his manifesto The Holy Shit and his DIY guide for building a composting toilet.

In the 1970s, Hundertwasser had his first architectural models built. The models for the Eurovision TV-show "Wünsch Dir was" (Make a Wish) in 1972 exemplified his ideas on forested roofs, tree tenants and the window right. In these and similar models he developed new architectural shapes, such as the spiral house, the eye-slit house, the terrace house and the high-rise meadow house. In 1974, Peter Manhardt made models for him of the pit-house, the grass roof house and the green service station – along with his idea of the invisible, inaudible Green Motorway.

In the early 1980s Hundertwasser remodelled the Rosenthal Factory in Selb, and the Mierka Grain Silo in Krems. These projects gave him the opportunity to act as what he called an "architecture doctor".

In architectural projects that followed he implemented window right and tree tenants, uneven floors, woods on the roof, and spontaneous vegetation. Works of this period include: housing complexes in Germany; a church in Bärnbach, Austria; a district heating plant in Vienna; an incineration plant and sludge centre in Osaka, Japan; a railway station in Uelzen; a winery in Napa Valley; and the Hundertwasser toilet in Kawakawa, New Zealand.

In 1993 Hundertwasser was invited to design an arts centre. He completed the design but the project was not completed at that time. The project was finally approved in 2015 and became the Hundertwasser Art Centre, opening to the public in 2022. This became the last authentic Hundertwasser building to be completed.

In 1999 Hundertwasser started his last project named Die Grüne Zitadelle von Magdeburg (in German). Although he never completed this work, the building was built a few years later in Magdeburg, a town in eastern Germany, and opened on 3 October 2005.

Buildings

- Hundertwasserhaus, Vienna, Austria
- District Heating Plant, Spittelau, Vienna, Austria
- Hundertwasserhaus Waldspirale, Darmstadt, Germany
- KunstHausWien, Vienna, Austria
- Kindergarten Heddernheim, Frankfurt
- Motorway Restaurant, Bad Fischau-Brunn, Austria
- Hot Springs Village, Bad Blumau, Austria
- Hundertwasserkirche, Bärnbach, Austria
- Markthalle, Altenrhein, Switzerland
- Wohnen unterm Regenturm, Plochingen, Germany
- Quixote Winery, Napa Valley, United States, 1988–1998 (his only building in the US)
- Maishima Incineration Plant, Osaka, Japan, 1997–2000
- Hundertwasser toilet, Kawakawa, New Zealand, 1999
- Hundertwasser "environmental railway station", Uelzen, Germany, 1999–2001
- Die Grüne Zitadelle von Magdeburg, Magdeburg, Germany, 2003–2005
- Ronald McDonald Kinder Vallei, Valkenburg aan de Geul, Netherlands
- Kuchlbauer-Turm, Abensberg, Germany, 2008–2010
- Hundertwasser Art Centre, Whangārei, New Zealand, 2022

An art gallery featuring Hundertwasser's work was established in the Hundertwasser Art Centre in Whangārei, New Zealand, and will brought to fruition his 1993 plans for the building.

=== Paintings ===
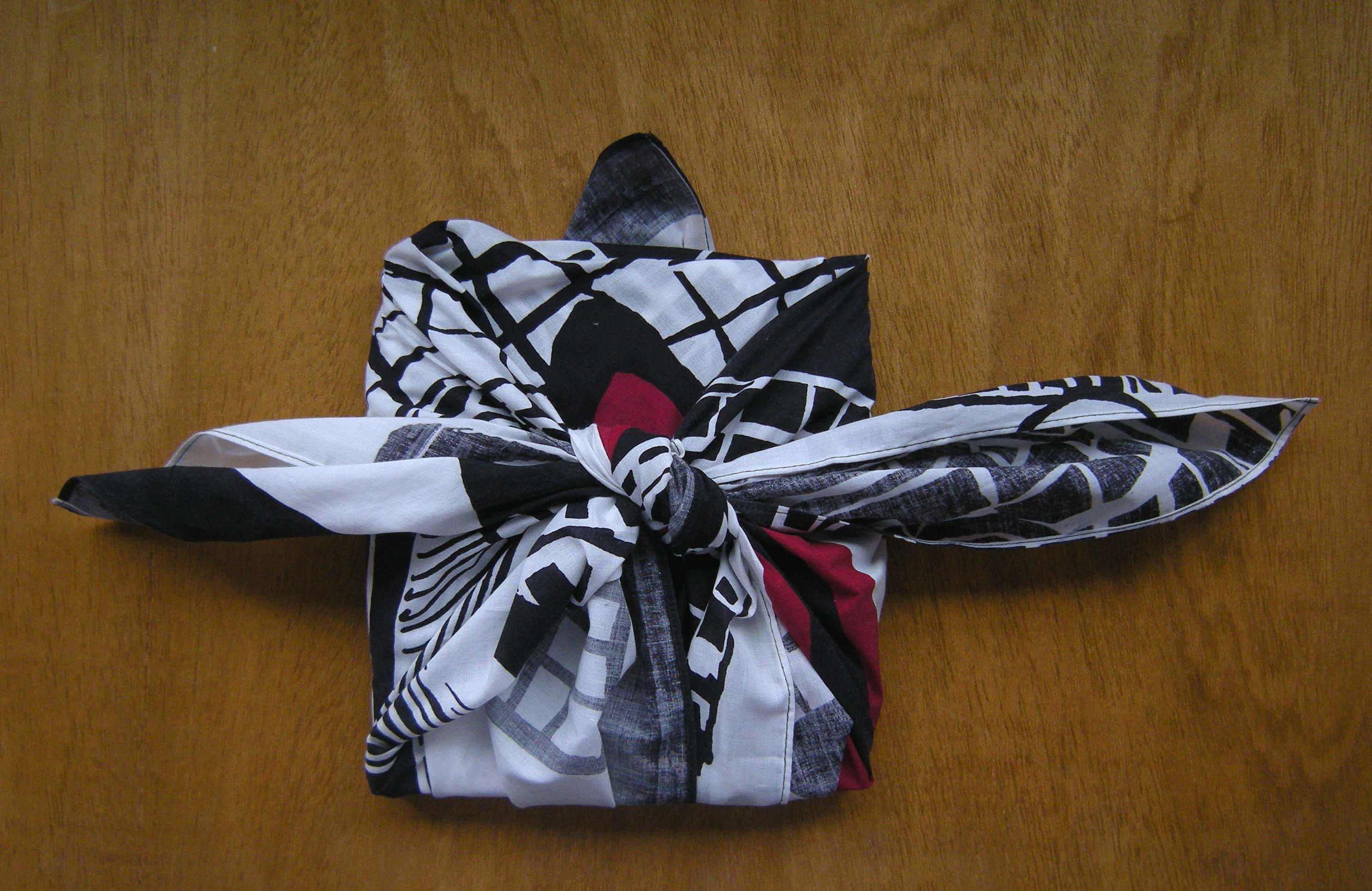
Furoshiki by Hundertwasser

- 1959 – Kaaba-Penis, die halbe Insel, Hamburg Collection Poppe
- 1954 – Hundertwasser develops the Transautomatism art theory.
- 1967 – "Kingdom of the Toro" series
- various Furoshiki designs

=== Stamps and medals ===
The extensive work of Hundertwasser includes 26 stamps for various postal administrations. Seventeen of these designs were – in part after his death – implemented as postage stamps.

- Austria
  - Modern Art in Austria, 1975
  - Council of Europe Summit, Vienna, 1993
  - 80th Birthday Friedensreich Hundertwasser (4 stamps in the form of a block), 2008
- Senegal – art on stamps (3 stamps), 1979
- Cape Verde Islands – Shipping, 1982 (printed but not issued), 1985 (issued with overprint)
- United Nations Postal Administration (Vienna, Geneva and New York) – 35th Anniversary of the Universal Declaration of Human Rights (6 stamps), 1983
- Liechtenstein – Homage to Liechtenstein, 1993

Two of the unrealised designs are alternative designs for a stamp issue (United Nations, Senegal) and were therefore not performed. Seven other designs created for the postal administrations of Morocco and French Polynesia were not realised as a postage stamp.

In addition, Friedensreich Hundertwasser, has adapted some of his works for stamp issues. On the basis of these adaptations have been stamps issued by:

- France – 2 badges for € Europe, 1994
- United Nations Postal Administration (Vienna, Geneva and New York) – Social Summit (3 stamps), 1995
- Luxembourg – European Capital of Culture (3 stamps), 1995
- Liechtenstein – EXPO 2000 in Hanover (3 stamps), 2000

The Austrian post office used more Hundertwasser motives for the European edition 1987 (Modern architecture, Hundertwasser House), on the occasion of his death in 2000 (painting Blue Blues, under the WIPA 2000) and 2004 National Donauauen (poster: The outdoors is our freedom at civil protests in Hainburg).

For the first time a Hundertwasser motive was also used on a Cuban stamp, as part of the art exhibition Salon de Mayo (Havana, 1967).

With the exception of service marks for the Council of Europe and the Cuban stamp, all stamps were engraved by Wolfgang Seidel and by the Austrian State Printing Office in a complex combination printing process produces (intaglio printing, rotogravure printing, as well as metal stamping).

Hundertwasser also worked as a medallist.

=== Books ===
- In 1989 Brockhaus released a 24-volume limited special edition of its encyclopaedia with 1800 pieces, entirely designed by Hundertwasser. Each individual cover of this edition varies in colour of the linen as well as in the colours of foil stamping, making each copy a unique piece. "No band, no cover I designed the encyclopedia is equal to the other. Nevertheless, they attack each other with all their differences and come together to form an overall picture. This is networking among themselves a symbol of knowledge, the Brockhaus gives." (F. Hundertwasser)
- Stowasser: Latin-German school dictionary of Joseph Maria Stowasser. For the newly published 1994 edition of the dictionary "Little Stowasser" Hundertwasser-designed textile bindings in 100 different colour variations.
- Bible. 1995, Size: 20x28, 5 cm, 1688 pages, 80 full-page images, including 30 collages, the hundreds of water specifically for this Bible – Edition has created. Each Bible is characterised by a different colour combination of linen textiles. Also the specimens differ in the bright shining metal colour imprints. Each cover is made mainly by hand.

== Political views ==
Beginning in the 1950s Hundertwasser travelled globally promoting ecological causes. In 1959 Hundertwasser got involved with helping the Dalai Lama escape from Tibet by campaigning for the Tibetan religious leader in Carl Laszlo's magazine Panderma. In later years, when he was already a known artist, Friedensreich Hundertwasser became an environmental activist and most recently operated as a more prominent opponent of the European Union, advocating the preservation of regional peculiarities.

Among the lesser-known facets of Hundertwasser's personality is his commitment to constitutional monarchy:

Austria needs something to look up to, consisting of perennial higher values—of which one now hardly dares to speak—such as beauty, culture, internal and external peace, faith, richness of heart [...] Austria needs an emperor, who is subservient to the people. A superior and radiant figure in whom everyone has confidence, because this great figure is a possession of all. The rationalist way of thinking has brought us, in this century, an ephemeral higher, American standard of living at the expense of nature and creation, which is now coming to an end, for it is destroying our heart, our quality of life, our longing, without which an Austrian does not want to live. It is outrageous that Austria has an emperor who did no evil to anyone but is still treated like a leper. Austria needs a crown! Long live Austria! Long live the constitutional monarchy! Long live Otto von Habsburg!
- Friedensreich Hundertwasser, Für die Wiederkehr der konstitutionellen Monarchie (For the Return of the Constitutional Monarchy). (Note: Hundertwasser's German term konstitutionelle Monarchie (constitutional monarchy) refers to a form of monarchy in which the monarch still has considerable influence in day-to-day politics, while the form in which the monarch is only a figurehead is called parlamentarische Monarchie (parliamentary monarchy).)
Kaurinui, New Zealand, 28 March 1983; dedicated, on 14 May 1987, to Otto von Habsburg for his 75th birthday.

== Influence ==
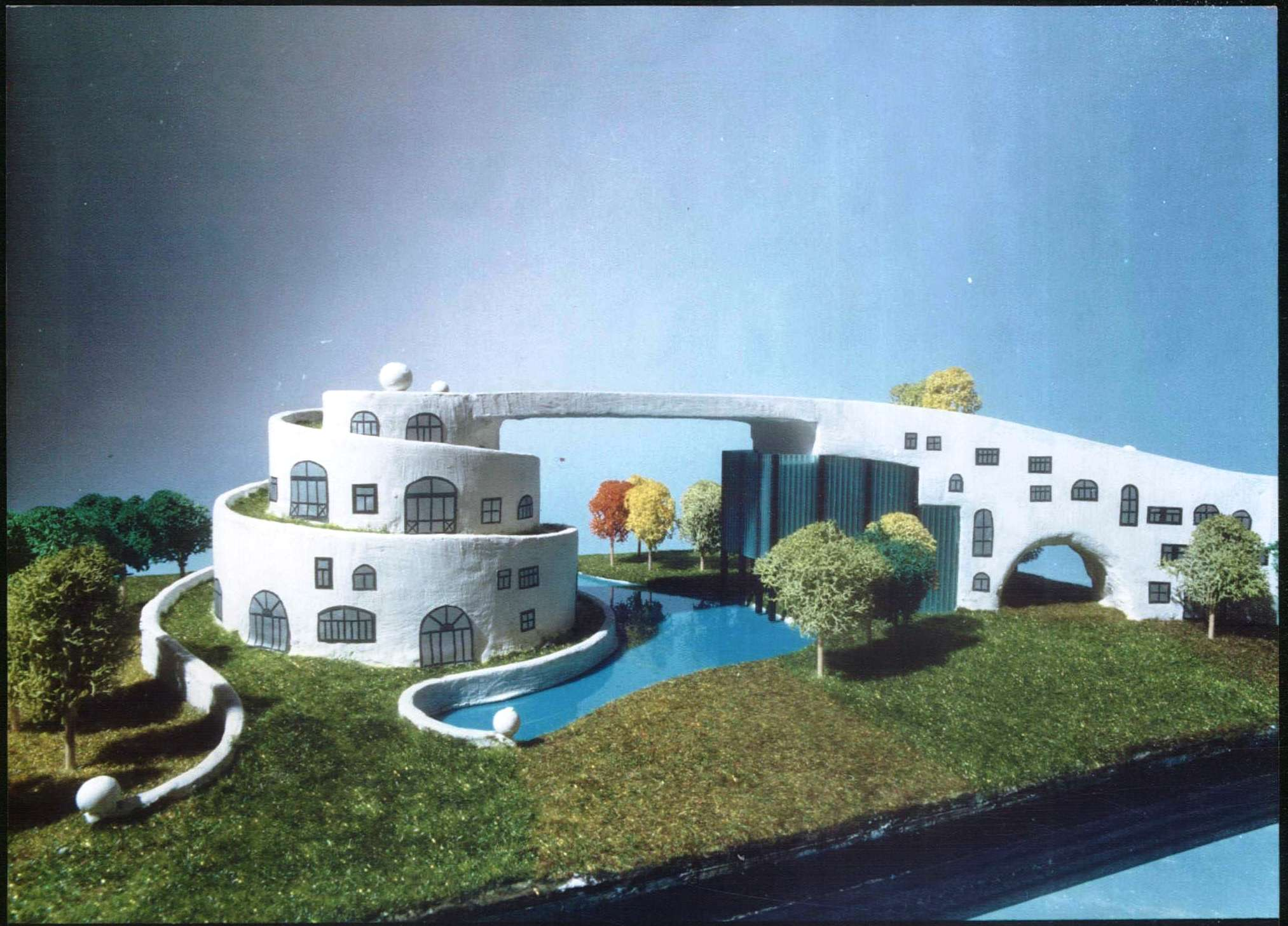
Hundertwasser's model of a proposed building to be constructed in Wellington

- In New Zealand his design beliefs have been adopted by a New Zealand terracotta tile manufacturer, who promotes his style as "Organic Tiling". The tiling is designed by Chris Southern, who worked with Hundertwasser on the Kawakawa toilets. In 2022 an art gallery opened in Whangārei, New Zealand, styled on his methods and including his artwork.
- In 1987, at the request of John Lydon, British designer and illustrator Richard Evans produced a homage to Hundertwasser for the cover of Public Image Limited's album Happy?.

== Awards ==
- 1959: Sanbra prize at the São Paulo Biennale, V.
- 1961: Mainichi Prize in Tokyo
- 1980: Grand Austrian State Prize for Visual Arts
- 1981: Austrian Nature Protection Award
- 1982: Award-winning Author of the year
- 1985: Officier de l'Ordre des Arts et des Lettres
- 1988: Gold Medal of the City of Vienna
- 1988: Gold Medal of Styria
- 1997: Grand Decoration of Honour for Services to the Republic of Austria

== Documentary films ==
- Ferry Radax: Hundertwasser – Leben in Spiralen (Hundertwasser – life in spirals, 1966). Ferry Radax first documentary on his fellow-countryman.
- Ferry Radax: Hundertwasser in Neuseeland (Hundertwasser in New Zealand, 1998). After 30 years Ferry Radax made a second portrait of the artist.
- Peter Schamoni: Hundertwassers Regentag (Hundertwasser's Rainy Day, 1972). An award-winning German documentary about the artist rebuilding an old wooden ship called Regentag (Rainy Day).

== Podcast ==
- Hundertwasser: Architecture as Spontaneous Vegetation by 99% Invisible.

== Literature ==
=== Catalogue raisonné ===
- Hundertwasser, Vollständiger Oeuvre-Katalog publiziert aus Anlass der 100. Ausstellung der Kestner-Gesellschaft, Text by Wieland Schmied (ed.), with 100 coloured reproductions. Kestner-Gesellschaft Hannover, Hanover, 1964
- David Kung (ed.), The Woodcut Works of Hundertwasser 1960–1975, Glarus: Gruener Janura AG, 1977
- Walter Koschatzky, Friedensreich Hundertwasser. The complete graphic work 1951–1986. New York: Rizzoli International Publications, 1986.
- Hundertwasser 1928–2000. Catalogue raisonné. Vol. I: Wieland Schmied: Personality, Life, Work. Vol. II: Andrea Fürst: Catalogue raisonné. Cologne: Taschen, 2000/2002
- Hundertwasser Graphic Works 1994–2000, Vienna: Museums Betriebs Gesellschaft, 2001

=== Monographs ===
- Werner Hofmann, Hundertwasser, Salzburg: Verlag Galerie Welz, 1965 (German and English editions)
- Francois Mathey, Hundertwasser, Naefels: Bonfini Press Corporation, 1985
- Harry Rand, Hundertwasser, Cologne: Taschen, 1991 (reprint 2018)
- Pierre Restany, Hundertwasser. The Power of Art – The Painter-King with the Five Skins, Cologne: Taschen, 1998
- Hundertwasser 1928–2000, Catalogue Raisonné, Vol. 1 by Wieland Schmied: Personality, Life, Work, Vol. 2 by Andrea Christa Fürst: Catalogue Raisonné, Cologne: Taschen, 2000/2002
- Pierre Restany, Hundertwasser, New York: Parkstone, 2008

=== Architectural monographs ===
- Robert Schediwy, Hundertwassers Häuser. Dokumente einer Kontroverse über zeitgemäße Architektur. Vienna: Edition Tusch, 1999, ISBN 3-85063-215-6.
- Hundertwasser Architecture, For a more human architecture in harmony with nature, Cologne: Taschen, 1997 (reprint 2018)

== Exhibitions ==
- Hundertwasser Malerei, Art Club, Vienna, 1952
- Studio Paul Facchetti, Paris, 1954
- Galerie H. Kamer, Paris, 1957
- Rétrospective Hundertwasser 1950–1960, Galerie Raymond Cordier, Paris, 1960
- Tokyo Gallery, Tokyo, 1961
- Hundertwasser ist ein Geschenk für Deutschland, Galerie Änne Abels, Cologne, 1963
- Travelling Exhibition 1964/65, Hundertwasser: Kestner-Gesellschaft, Hanover; Kunsthalle Bern; Karl-Ernst-Osthaus-Museum, Hagen; Stedelijk Museum, Amsterdam; Moderna Museet, Stockholm; Museum des 20. Jahrhunderts, Vienna
- Travelling Exhibition 1968/69: USA, Hundertwasser; University Art Museum, Berkeley; Santa Barbara Museum of Art, Santa Barbara; The Museum of Fine Arts, Houston; The Arts Club of Chicago; The Galerie St. Etienne, New York; The Phillips Collection, Washington DC
- Galerie Brockstedt, Hamburg, 1968/1969
- Aberbach Fine Art, New York, 1973
- Travelling Exhibition 1973/74, Hundertwasser 1973 New Zealand, City of Auckland Art Gallery, Auckland; Govett-Brewster Art Gallery, New Plymouth; The New Zealand Academy of Fine Arts, Wellington; City Art Gallery, Christchurch; City Art Gallery, Dunedin
- Travelling Exhibition, Hundertwasser 1974 Australia, National Gallery of Victoria, Melbourne; Albert Hall, Canberra; Opera, Sydney
- Stowasser 1943 bis Hundertwasser 1974, Albertina, Vienna, 1974
- Haus der Kunst, Munich, 1975
- Austria Presents Hundertwasser to the Continents. The World Travelling Museum Exhibition took place in 43 museums in 27 countries from 1975 to 1983.
- Hundertwasser. Das gesamte graphische Werk, Tapisserien, Mönchehaus-Museum für Moderne Kunst, Goslar, Germany, 1978
- Hundertwasser Tapisserien, Österreichisches Museum für angewandte Kunst, Vienna, 1979
- Travelling Exhibition 1979–1981, Hundertwasser Is Painting, Aberbach Fine Art, New York; Tokyo Gallery, Tokyo; Galerie Brockstedt, Hamburg; Hammerlunds Kunsthandel; Galerie Würthle, Vienna
- Hundertwasser – Sérigraphies, eaux fortes, gravures sur bois japonaises, lithographies, Artcurial, Paris, 1980
- Hundertwasser – Peintures Récentes, Artcurial, Paris, 1982
- Paintings by Hundertwasser, Aberbach Fine Art, New York, 1983
- Hundertwasser – Kunst und Umwelt, Mönchehaus-Museum für Moderne Kunst, Goslar, Germany, 1984
- Hundertwasser à Tahiti – Gravure, Musée Gauguin, Tahiti, 1985/1986
- Hundertwasser – Aus dem graphischen Werk, BAWAG Foundation, Vienna, 1986
- Travelling exhibition 1989: Japan, Hundertwasser; Tokyo Metropolitan Teien Art Museum, Tokyo; Iwaki City Art Museum, Fukushima; Ohara Museum of Art, Okayama
- Friedensreich Hundertwasser – Originale, Objekte, Gobelins, Graphiken, Galerie am Lindenplatz, Schaan, Liechtenstein, 1993
- Hundertwasser – Important works, Landau Fine Art, Montreal, 1994/1995
- Friedensreich Hundertwasser – Die Waagerechte gehört der Natur, Mönchehaus-Museum für Moderne Kunst, Goslar, Germany, 1997
- Hundertwasser Retrospektive, Institut Mathildenhöhe, Darmstadt, Germany, 1998
- Travelling Exhibition 1998/99: Japan, Hundertwasser; Isetan Museum of Art, Tokyo; Museum "EKi", Kyoto; Sakura City Museum of Art, Chiba
- Travelling Exhibition 1999: Japan, Hundertwasser Architecture – For a More Human Architecture in Harmony With Nature, Takamatsu City Museum of Art, Takamatsu; Nagoya City Art Museum, Nagoya; Hyogo Prefectural Museum of Modern Art, Kobe; The Museum of Modern Art, Saitama
- Hundertwasser – Peintures Parcours Rétrospectif, Galerie Patrice Trigano, Paris, 1999/2000
- Hundertwasser Gedächtnisausstellung, Neue Galerie der Stadt Linz, Austria, 2000
- Hundertwasser 1928–2000, Russeck Gallery, Palm Beach, 2000
- Hundertwasser-Architektur – Von der Utopie zur Realität, KunstHausWien, Vienna, 2000/2001
- Hommage à Hundertwasser 1928–2000, Musée des Beaux-Arts et de la Dentelle, Alençon, France, 2001
- Hundertwasser. Kunst – Mensch – Natur, Minoritenkloster, Tulln and Egon Schiele-Museum, Tulln, Lower Austria, 2004
- Hundertwasser. Fantastische Architectuur, Kunsthal Rotterdam, 2004
- Travelling Exhibition 2005/06: Germany, Friedensreich Hundertwasser – Ein Sonntagsarchitekt. Gebaute Träume und Sehnsüchte; Deutsches Architekturmuseum (DAM), Frankfurt; Stiftung Schleswig-Holsteinische Landesmuseen, Schloss Gottorf; Kunstforum der Bausparkasse Schwäbisch Hall AG, Schwäbisch Hall; Städtische Museen Zwickau, Kunstsammlungen, Zwickau
- Travelling Exhibition 2006/07: Japan, Remainders of an Ideal. The Visions and Practices of HUNDERTWASSER, The National Museum of Modern Art, Kyoto; Musee d`art Mercian Karuizawa; Mitsukoshi Museum, Tokyo; Shimonoseki Museum, Yamaguchi
- The Art of Friedensreich Hundertwasser. A Magical Eccentric, Szépmüvészeti Museum, Budapest, 2007/2008
- Hundertwasser. La raccolta dei sogni, Art Forum Würth, Capena near Rome, 2008
- Hundertwasser – Jüdische Aspekte, Jüdisches Museum Rendsburg, Julius-Magnus Haus, Rendsburg, Germany, 2008
- Hundertwasser. In Harmonie mit der Natur, Minoritenkloster, Tulln, Austria, 2008
- "den Cherub betören". Friedensreich Hundertwasser und die Sehnsucht des Menschen nach dem Paradies, Christuskirche in Mainz and Landesmuseum Mainz, Germany, 2008
- Musee d'Unterlinden, Colmar, France, 2008
- The Yet Unknown Hundertwasser, KunstHausWien, Vienna, 2008/2009
- H U N D E R T W A S S E R. Symbiose von Technik, Ökologie und Kunst. Die Wiedergutmachung an Industriegebäuden, Fernwärme Wien, Vienna, 2009
- Hundertwasser-Pfad durch die Fernwärme Wien, Vienna, 2009
- HUNDERTWASSER 2010 IN SEOUL, Seoul Arts Center – Design Museum, Seoul, Korea, 2010/2011
- Hundertwasser – The Art of the Green Path, 20 years KunstHausWien anniversary exhibition, KunstHausWien, Austria, 2011
- Hundertwasser – Le Rêve de la couleur, Centre de la Vieille Charité, Marseille, France, 2012
- Friedensreich Hundertwasser: Against the Grain. Works 1949–1970. Kunsthalle Bremen, Germany, 2012/2013
- Hundertwasser – Japan and the Avant-garde. Österreichische Galerie Belvedere, Unteres Belvedere/Orangerie, Vienna, 2013
- Dans la peau de Hundertwasser, Museé en Herbe, Paris, 2014
- HUNDERTWASSER: DE RECHTE LIJN IS GODDELOOS, Cobra Museum voor Moderne Kunst, Amstelveen, Netherlands, 2013/2014
- Hundertwasser, Arken Museum, Ishøj, Denmark, 2014
- Friedensreich Hundertwasser – Die Ernte der Träume, Sammlung Würth, Forum Würth Arlesheim, Switzerland, 2017
- Hundertwasser – Lebenslinien, Osthaus Museum Hagen, Hagen, Germany, 2015
- Hundertwasser. Schön & Gut, Buchheim Museum, Bernried, Germany, 2016/2017
- Hundertwasser – The green city, Sejong Museum of Art, Seoul, Korea, 2016/2017
- Hundertwasser – En route pour le bonheur!, Musée de Millau et de Grands Causses, Millau, Frankreich, 2018

== Collections ==
- Akademie der bildenden Künste, Gemäldegalerie, Vienna, Austria
- Akademie der bildenden Künste, Kupferstichkabinett, Vienna, Austria
- Albertina, Vienna, Austria
- Albertina, Vienna – Sammlung Essl
- Albertina, Vienna – Sammlung Batliner
- Artothek des Bundes, Vienna, Austria
- Belvedere Museum, Austria.
- Brooklyn Museum, New York, USA
- Centre National d'Art et de Culture Georges Pompidou, Paris, France
- Cincinnati Art Museum, USA
- Erzbischöfliches Dom- und Diözesanmuseum, Vienna, Austria
- Hamburger Kunsthalle, Germany
- Henie-Onstad Kunstsenter, Høvikodden, Norway
- Herbert Liaunig Privatstiftung, Austria
- Hilti Foundation, Liechtenstein
- Iwaki City Art Museum, Japan
- KUNSTEN Museum of Modern Art Aalborg, Denmark
- Kunsthalle Bremen, Germany
- KunstHausWien, Museum Hundertwasser, Vienna, Austria
- KunstHausVienna, Museum Hundertwasser, Vienna, Austria
- Kupferstichkabinett, Staatliche Museen zu Berlin – Preußischer Kulturbesitz, Germany
- Louisiana Museum of Modern Art, Humlebaek, Denmark
- MAK – Museum für angewandte Kunst, Vienna, Austria
- McMaster Museum of Art, McMaster University, Hamilton, Canada
- Mishkan Le'Omanut, Museum of Art, Ein-Harod, Israel
- MUMOK – Museum Moderner Kunst Stiftung Ludwig Wien, Vienna, Austria
- Muscarelle Museum of Art, Williamsburg, Virginia, USA
- Musée d'Art moderne, Troyes, France
- Museo de Arte Contemporáneo, Santiago de Chile
- Museo del Novecento, Collezione Boschi di Stefano, Milan, Italy
- Museo Thyssen-Bornemisza, Madrid, Spain
- Museu de Arte Contemporanea da USP, São Paulo, Brasil
- Museum der Moderne – Rupertinum, Salzburg, Austria
- Museum für Kunst und Gewerbe, Hamburg, Germany
- Museum of Modern Art, New York
- Museumslandschaft Hessen Kassel, Museum Schloss Wilhelmshöhe, Graphische Sammlung, Germany
- muzej moderne i suvremene umjetnosti – museum of modern and contemporary art, Rijeka, Croatia
- Nagoya City Art Museum, Japan
- National Gallery of Art, Washington
- Nationalgalerie Prag / Narodni galerie v Praze, Czech Republic
- Ny Carlsberg Glyptotek, Kopenhagen, Denmark
- Ohara Museum of Art, Okayama, Japan
- Osthaus Museum Hagen, Germany
- Peggy Guggenheim Collection, Venice, Italy
- Pinakothek der Moderne, Munich, Germany
- Saint Louis University, USA
- Sammlung Würth, Künzelsau, Germany
- San Diego Museum of Art, USA
- San Francisco Museum of Modern Art, USA
- Solomon R. Guggenheim Museum, New York, USA
- Spencer Museum of Art, Lawrence, USA
- Sprengel Museum Hannover, Hanover, Germany
- Statens Museum for Kunst, Copenhagen, Denmark
- Stedelijk Museum Amsterdam, Netherlands
- Städtische Kunsthalle Mannheim, Germany
- Takamatsu City Museum of Art, Japan
- The Gerard L. Cafesjian Collection, Yerevan, Armenia
- The Heckscher Museum of Art, Huntington, USA
- The Museum of Modern Art, New York, USA
- The Nelson-Atkins Museum of Art, Kansas City, USA
- The Niigata Prefectural Museum of Modern Art, Japan
- Wien Museum, Vienna, Austria

== See also ==
- Roof garden
- Green roof
- Urban agriculture
- Skyrise greenery
- Cool roof
- Green wall
