= 1985 in architecture =

The year 1985 in architecture involved some significant architectural events and new buildings.

== Events ==
- The Inman Report is released, with major implications for the architecture of United States embassies.
- International architectural firm Aedas is established by Keith Griffiths in Hong Kong as Hackett and Griffiths.

== Buildings and structures ==
=== Buildings opened ===
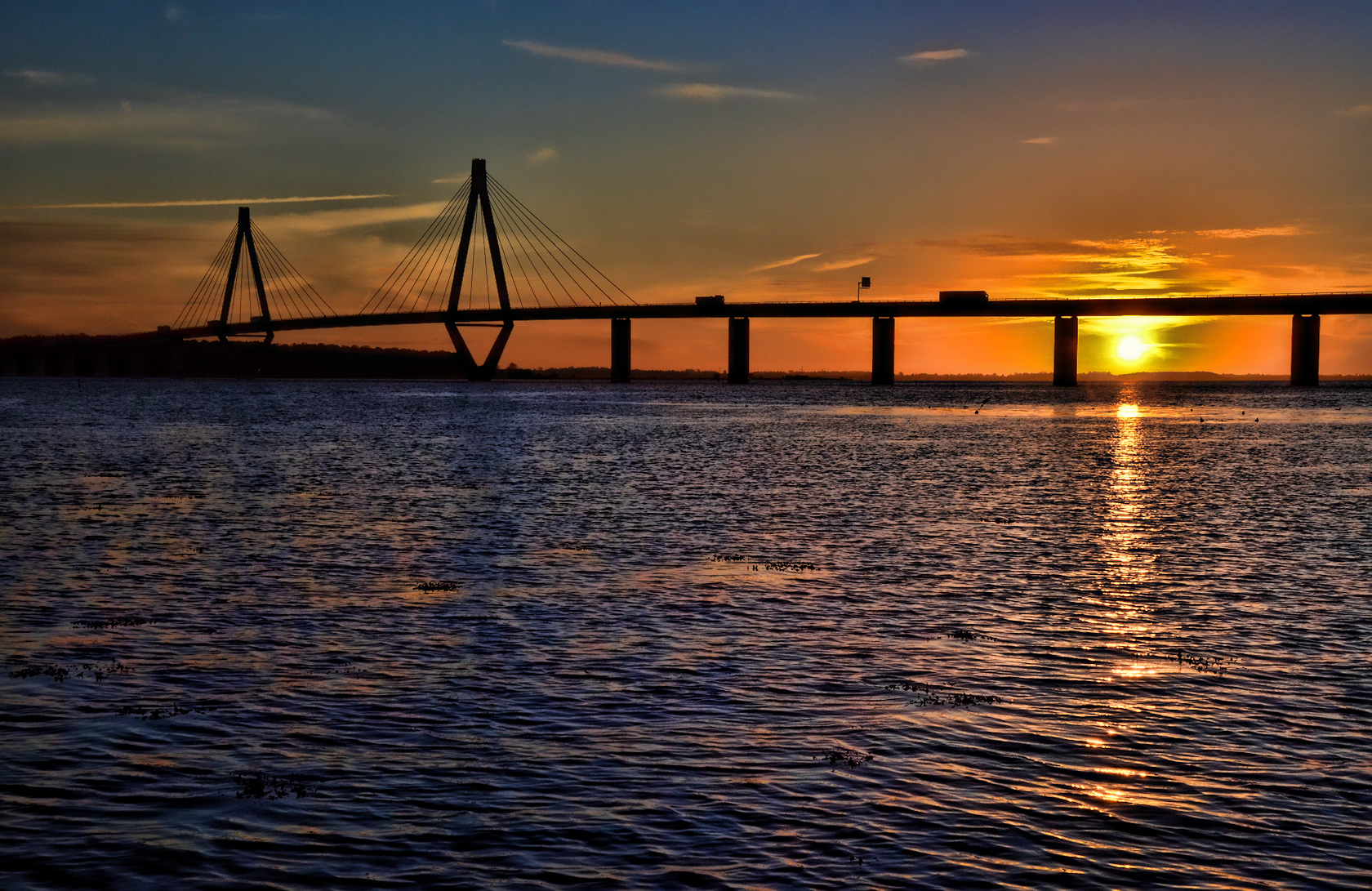
Farø Bridges (south), Denmark

St. Paul's Cathedral, Abidjan

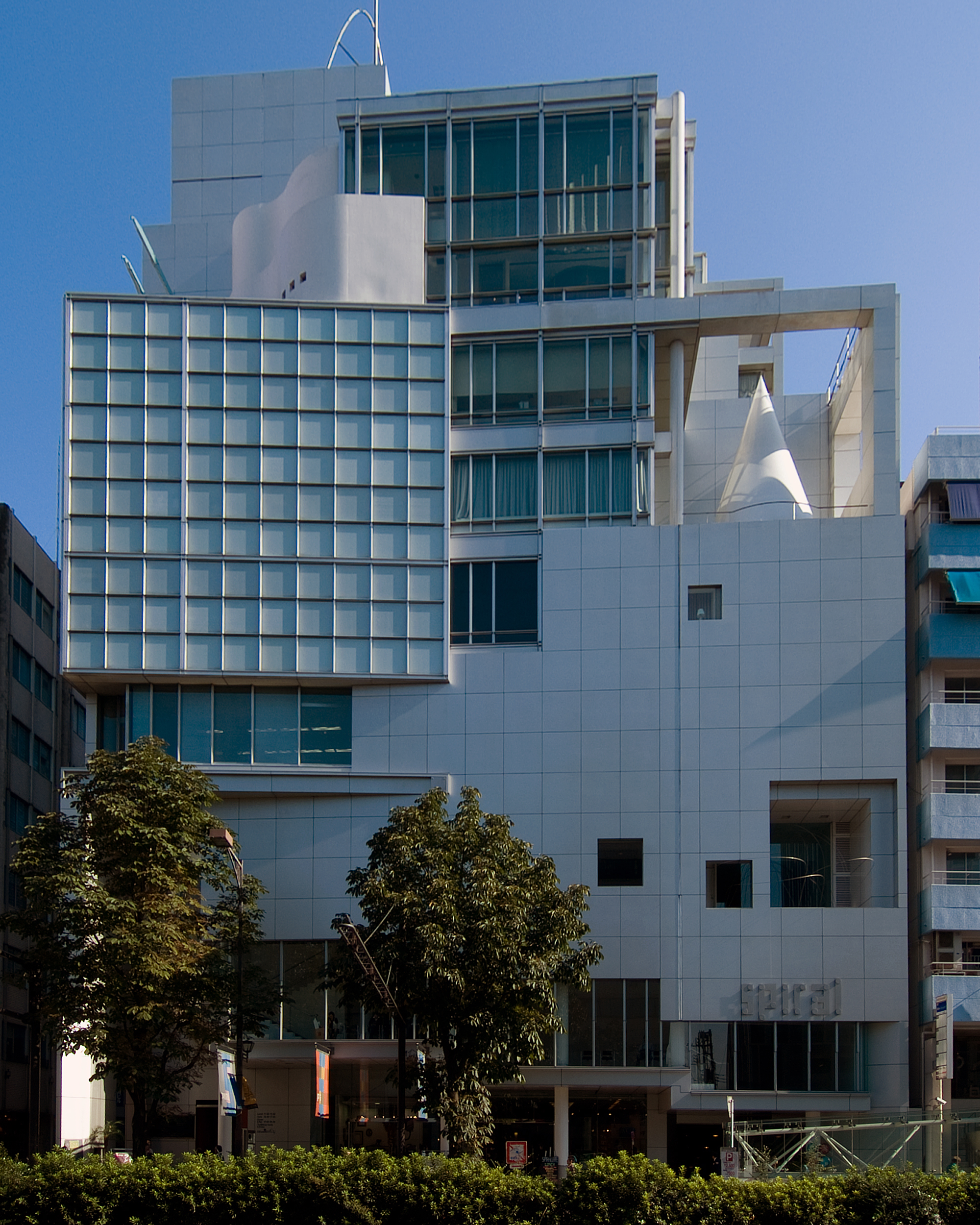
The Spiral in Tokyo, Japan

- January 15 – The Tashkent Tower in Tashkent, Uzbekistan begins operation after six years construction.
- March 2 – Columbia Center (formerly the Bank of America Tower) in Seattle, Washington, United States.
- June 4 – Farø Bridges, Denmark.
- July 27 – The 63 Building officially opens as the tallest skyscraper outside North America in Yeouido, Seoul, South Korea.
- August 10 – St. Paul's Cathedral, Abidjan, Ivory Coast, designed by Aldo Spirito, is consecrated by the Pope.
- September 7 – The first concert is held at the Scottish Exhibition and Conference Centre in Glasgow, Scotland.

=== Buildings completed ===
- November 18 – HSBC Headquarters Building in Hong Kong.
- Central State Museum of Kazakhstan.
- The Bank of America Plaza in Dallas, Texas, United States.
- Several notable buildings in Manhattan, New York City, United States:
  - The first tower in the World Financial Center.
  - New York Marriott Marquis.
  - Tower 49.
- Amarin Plaza in Bangkok, designed by Rangsan Torsuwan.
- Pak Sha O Youth Hostel in Hong Kong, designed by Rocco Design Architects.
- Hundertwasserhaus in Vienna.
- The Sender Eifel-Bärbelkreuz in Hellenthal, Germany.
- Tyholttårnet in Trondheim, Norway.
- Calgary Municipal Building in Calgary
- Spiral in Tokyo, Japan.
- Mjøsa Bridge, Norway.
- Nanjing Massacre Memorial Hall, Nanjing, China.
- Reconstruction of Basilica of St. Cunibert, Cologne, after bombing of Cologne in World War II.
- Thematic House (remodeled structure) by Charles Jencks, Terry Farrell, Michael Graves and others in Holland Park, Kensington, London, United Kingdom.
- Burnham Copse Infant School, England by Hampshire County Architects.

== Awards ==
- AIA Gold Medal – William Wayne Caudill (posthumous)
- Alvar Aalto Medal – Tadao Ando
- Architecture Firm Award – Venturi, Rauch and Scott Brown
- Grand prix national de l'architecture – Michel Andrault and Pierre Parat
- Pritzker Prize – Hans Hollein
- RAIA Gold Medal – Richard Johnson
- RIBA Royal Gold Medal – Richard Rogers
- Twenty-five Year Award – General Motors Technical Center

== Deaths ==
- September 30 – Herbert Bayer, Austrian and American graphic designer, painter, photographer, sculptor, art director, environmental and interior designer and architect (born 1900)
- November 13 – William Pereira, American architect of Portuguese ancestry (born 1909)
- November 22 – Gudolf Blakstad, Norwegian architect (born 1893)
- Dewi-Prys Thomas, Welsh architect (born 1916)
- Naoum Shebib, Egyptian architect (born 1915)
