= Burnham Copse Infant School =

Former school in Hampshire, England

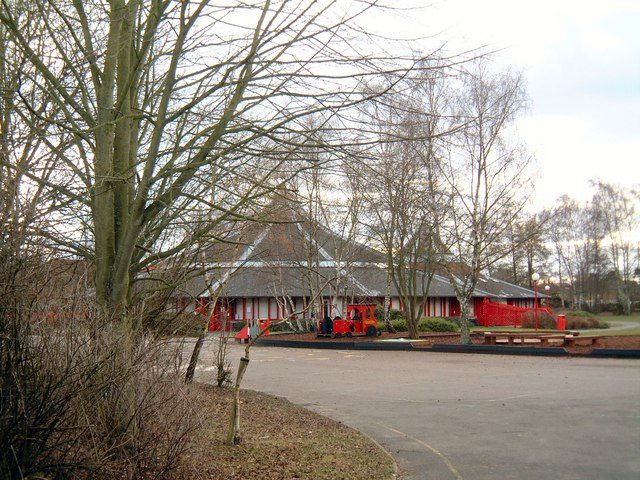
- The school buildings (pictured in 2006)
- Interactive map of the Burnham Copse Infant School area

General information
- Status: Demolished
- Type: School
- Location: Newchurch Road, Tadley, Hampshire, United Kingdom
- Coordinates: 51.3558°N 1.1504°W
- Completed: 1985
- Demolished: 2010

Design and construction
- Architects: Colin Stansfield Smith; Ian Templeton; Ian Lower
- Architecture firm: Hampshire County Architects Department
- Main contractor: W. M. Annette

Burnham Copse Infant School was a school in Tadley, Hampshire, UK. It was known for its unique architecture for a school, which was designed by a team led by Colin Stansfield Smith. It was commended by Architectural Design, and described by the Twentieth Century Society as "eclectic, witty, and imaginative" and by Marcus Binney as having "adventurous form and silhouette".

The school opened in 1985. It merged with the adjacent junior school in 2006, and the site was demolished in 2010.

== History ==
The first school, Burnham Copse County Infant School, existed from 1954 to 1959 and served employees of the Atomic Weapons Research Establishment (AWRE), north of Tadley, Hampshire. The school was on the AWRE site at the former Burnham's Copse, across the Hampshire border in Berkshire. This was described as a "temporary postwar location", and was replaced by school buildings in Tadley. Land was acquired near the existing junior school on Newchurch Road – described as a "badly run-down area" – to build a permanent infant school, replacing what was described by the council in 1973 as "temporary buildings" located south of Newchurch Road.

== Design ==
The design brief was for a 245-capacity school with seven classes, with the ability to expand to 315 pupils with a further two classrooms.

The school buildings were designed by Ian Templeton and Ian Lower of Hampshire County Architects Department, under the supervision of Colin Stansfield Smith. The conical roof designs were inspired by circus tents and tipis. They had timber frames; other materials included Eternit asbestos slate, glass, and herringbone tiles, with globe finials. The rationale for having a centralised main shared area, off which are the classrooms with their own outdoors access, may have been inspired by post-war schools such as Templewood Primary School.

The project was tendered in March 1983. The contractor for the construction was W. M. Annette of Basingstoke, and the quantity surveyor was Langdon & Every. Building costs were £415.62 per square metre (£38.61 per sq ft).

=== Architecture ===
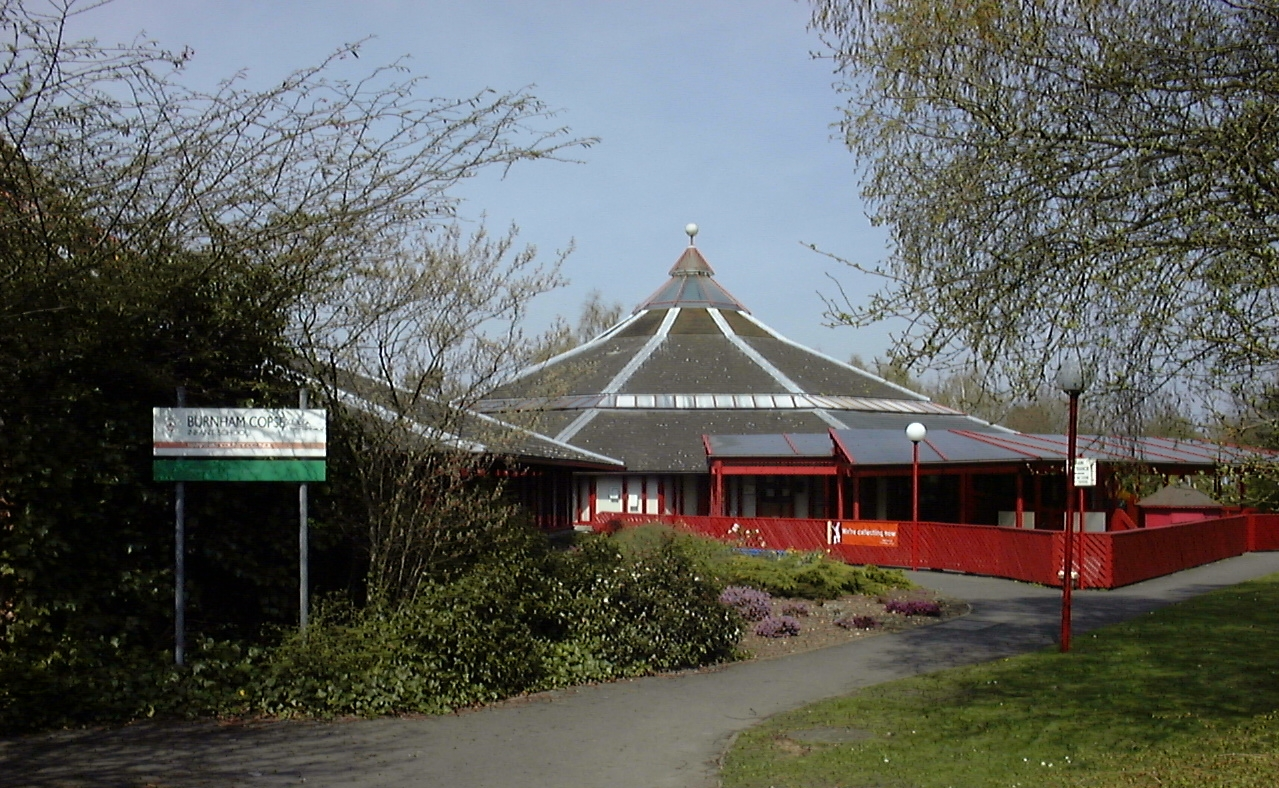
The classroom building (pictured in 2006)

The school consisted of two main buildings. The larger building, (Note: The classroom building was approximately 12 metres (39 ft) tall) approximately 28 metres (92 ft) in diameter, had a decagonal roof and had classrooms surrounding a central shared area. The classrooms were separated from adjacent classrooms by walls, though they were open plan in their connection to the central area. This has been described as "informal and uninhibiting to small children". Each classroom had its own partly enclosed outside teaching area. The central shared area of the larger building was open up to its apex.

The smaller building (Note: The hall/administration building was approximately 14 metres (46 ft) tall) – 22 metres (72 ft) in diameter and with an octagonal roof – housed the school hall and administration offices. Unlike the teaching building, the hall had internally exposed purlins and rafters and was top-lit. The internal structure was painted in rich colours to provide a "stimulating environment" for the pupils.

The main hall was situated half a storey below the classrooms. Weston described these different levels as "deterministic" of the buildings' use but felt that "the richness of the architecture [was] expected to compensate" for the restrictions. He said that the difference in levels would not be compatible with modern accessibility regulations. (Note: Disabled lavatories were installed in the administration building)

== Reception ==
The buildings were opened in 1985 in a ceremony performed by former pupil Kathy Smallwood. Colloquially, the school became known as the "tipi", "circus tent", "magic roundabout", "roundhouse", "oast house", "chapter house", and "wigwam".

Richard Weston celebrated Stansfield Smith's architecture for Hampshire County Council schools, describing Burnham Copse Infants as a "climax" of Stansfield Smith's "big roof" style. He suggested that Henry Morris would have approved of the design as the buildings would be "fit to stand 'side by side with the parish church' as a symbolic centre for the community it serves". The Twentieth Century Society described the school as being part of a series of "eclectic, witty, and imaginative" public buildings, and described its design as having "evocative and place-making form". Architectural Design gave the school its 1984 commendation. In The Buildings Around Us (1995), architect Thom Gorst described the conical roofs as "not unassuming" and their design was deliberate to "give some character to the low-key surroundings". He characterised the buildings as "completely unlike old Victorian Board school[s]".

A 1989 ERIC seminar said that the new buildings at Burnham Copse "provide a rich and exciting environment" but "the design [...] appears to be considered as if it were a decorative and trivial luxury."

The school influenced Hampshire County Architects' design of Stoke Park Infant School in Bishopstoke, which was completed in July 1989.

== Closure ==
Falling pupil numbers led to the school's merger with the adjacent junior school in December 2006 to form Burnham Copse Primary School. The infant school site remained in use until the end of the 2007–08 academic year, when refurbishment, remodelling, and extension of the junior school buildings had been completed. This replacement school building won an RIBA Award in 2009, which Marcus Binney described as "ironic", comparing the new building's "plain functional lines and detailing" with the "adventurous form and silhouette" of what they replaced.

The closed site was vandalised and targeted by thieves, and was demolished in August 2010 to save on security or maintenance costs. Plans for redeveloping the site were delayed until the resolution of a nearby planning appeal; both were affected by the Atomic Weapons Establishment's three-kilometre (1.9 mi) emergency planning zone. (Note: The Atomic Weapons Establishment, or AWE, is the successor to the AWRE) A 36-dwelling development was approved in 2016.

The Twentieth Century Society described the school's demolition as a "waste" and believed the buildings should have been listed; the school was added to the society's "Lost Modern Heritage" list in 2017.
