= George Conrad Roller =

English portrait painter (1856–1941)

- Born: 10 June 1856; Clapham, Surrey, England
- Died: 1 January 1941 (aged 84); England
- Other names: Major Roller
- Education: Westminster School; Lambeth School of Art; Académie Julian (Paris)
- Occupations: Portrait painter; Illustrator; Picture restorer; Soldier
- Known for: Advertising illustrations for Burberry; restoration work for the Royal Academy; friendship with John Singer Sargent

George Conrad Roller (1856–1941), sometimes referred to as Major Roller, was a British portrait painter, illustrator and picture restorer. He is best known for his long association with Burberry as an early advertising illustrator, his work as a restorer for the Royal Academy at Burlington House, and his friendship with John Singer Sargent. Roller also served with distinction in the Second Boer War and the First World War.

== Early life and education ==
Roller was born in Clapham, Surrey, in 1856. He was educated at Westminster School before training at Lambeth School of Art in London and later at Académie Julian in Paris.

== Artistic career ==
He exhibited at the Royal Academy between 1884 and 1906. For nearly four decades he produced advertising illustrations for Burberry, specialising in sporting and outdoor subjects. Roller worked for over 20 years as restorer for the Royal Academy, including the restoration of paintings damaged in suffragette attacks in 1914. He was a friend of John Singer Sargent, who painted his portrait and accompanied him on painting trips.

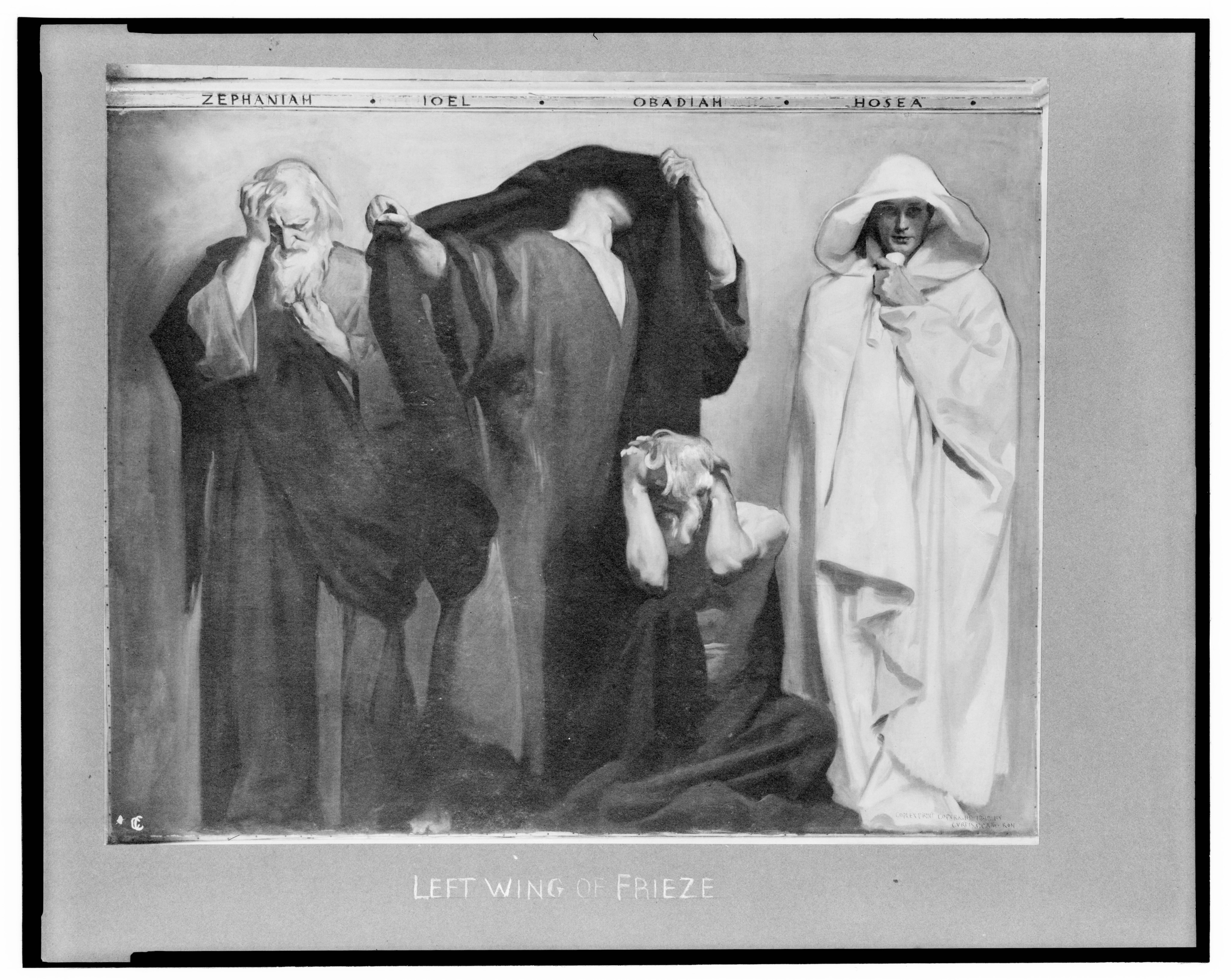
Prophets: Zephaniah, Joel, Obadiah, Hosea by John Singer Sargent, Boston Public Library. The figure of Hosea (right) is believed to depict George Conrad Roller.

== Burberry illustration ==
For almost four decades Roller worked as the principal illustrator for the clothing manufacturer Burberry. His advertising images, particularly of sporting and outdoor subjects, defined the company’s public image in the late nineteenth and early twentieth centuries before the widespread use of photography. Roller’s illustrations appeared in catalogues, posters and other promotional material.

== Military service ==
Roller served in the Second Boer War and the First World War, attaining the rank of Honorary Major. He was commended for bravery, including a documented rescue of a comrade on horseback.

== Personal life ==
Roller was raised at The Grange in Clapham Common, London. In later life he split his time between addresses in London and in Tadley, Berkshire.

In 1887, he married Mary Margaret Halliday; the couple had two children, George Trevor (died 1947) and Miriam (died 1928). After Mary's death in 1908, Roller remarried in 1910 to Emily Kirk Craig; this marriage produced no children.

Roller died on 4 January 1941 while visiting Salisbury, Wiltshire. He was buried at St Peter’s Churchyard in Tadley.

== Other activities ==
A keen horseman, Roller was noted as a steeplechase rider in his younger years. In later life he served as a governor of several London hospitals, including as an Honorary Life Governor of the Royal Berkshire Hospital.

== Selected works ==
- Imperial Volunteers Taking Cover in a Farmyard (Reading Museum)
