= Colin Stansfield Smith =

English cricketer, architect, and academic (1932–2013)

Professor Sir Colin Stansfield Smith CBE
- Portland Building, University of Portsmouth
- Born: 1 October 1932; Didsbury, Manchester, England
- Died: 18 June 2013 (aged 80)
- Education: William Hulme's Grammar School, Manchester
- Alma mater: Christ's College, Cambridge
- Occupation: Architect
- Relatives: Donald Smith (brother)

Sir Colin Stansfield Smith, CBE (1 October 1932 – 18 June 2013) was a British architect and academic. He played over 100 games of first-class cricket in the 1950s.

== Background ==
Colin Smith was born in Didsbury, Manchester. His father, Stansfield Smith, played Lancashire League cricket regularly for Accrington Cricket Club in the 1920s and once in Minor Counties cricket for Cheshire in 1949. Colin Smith's older brother, Donald, played in three first-class cricket matches for Lancashire in 1951 and 1952.

Stansfield Smith was educated at William Hulme's Grammar School, Manchester, and Christ's College, Cambridge, where he studied at the School of Architecture from 1953 to 1958.

In 1961, he married Angela Jean Earnshaw Maw who, after his bank confused him with another Colin Smith, suggested that he include his middle name Stansfield into his surname, which he did, thus becoming a Stansfield Smith. This is a compound surname.

== Architecture ==
Stansfield Smith worked in various architect's offices, including the LCC and the GLC in London. From 1971 to 1973, he was deputy county architect at Cheshire County Council, under the directorship of Jack Whittle.

Stansfield Smith was head of Hampshire County Architects Department from 1973 to 1992. During that period, the work of his office became well known worldwide, especially for its new schools within the county.

Stansfield Smith became a Professor of Architecture at the school of architecture at the University of Portsmouth in 1992, and later emeritus professor. He designed the university's Portland building (opened in 1997) to house the School of Architecture and other environmental faculties when it opened. The building is now used by Civil Engineering, Surveying, Information Services and the Business School.

National Life Stories conducted an oral history interview (C467/85) with Colin Stansfield Smith in 2007–09 for its Architects Lives' collection held by the British Library.

== Cricket ==
As a cricketer, Smith was known as "Colin Smith" and was a right-handed batsman and right-arm fast-medium bowler who played all his first-class cricket between 1951 and 1958. His county cricket was played for Lancashire, who capped him in 1957, but he also appeared for Cambridge University (for whom he gained his blue) among a number of other teams. He was selected for the Gentlemen against the Players at Lord's in 1957.

He scored one first-class century, hitting 103 not out for Cambridge against Warwickshire at Edgbaston in June 1957. As a bowler he enjoyed some success, taking five or more wickets in an innings on nine occasions. His career-best return was 6-35 for Cambridge versus Free Foresters at Fenner's in June 1955.

== Honours ==
Stansfield Smith was appointed a Commander of the Order of the British Empire (CBE) in 1988, was awarded the RIBA Royal Gold Medal in 1991, and was knighted "for services to Architecture" in 1993.

== Publications ==
- Hampshire Architecture, John Wiley and Sons, 1988 (ISBN 978-0-85670-857-2).
- A Caring Tradition (audio recording), Pidgeon Digital, 1992.
