= Donald Smith (Lancashire cricketer) =

English cricketer

Donald John Smith (1 May 1929 – 3 December 2004) played first-class cricket for Lancashire County Cricket Club in the early 1950s. He was born at Accrington in Lancashire in 1929.

Smith played as a left-arm swing bowler. He played for Cheshire County Cricket Club in the Minor Counties Championship in 1949 and 1950, before giving up his job as a bank clerk in order to play for Lancashire, making his debut in June 1951 against the touring South Africans. He played in a total of three first-class matches, with a County Championship appearance against Hampshire later in June 1951 being followed by a match against the 1952 Indians. He took four wickets and scored 26 runs with a highest score of 14.

Although he continued to play Second XI cricket for Lancashire until the 1953 season, he played all of his other cricket in league matches. Smith later became a successful businessman. He died at Birch Vale in Stockport in 2004 He was aged 75.

== Family ==
Smith's father, Stansfield Smith, played Lancashire League cricket regularly for Accrington Cricket Club in the 1920s and once in Minor Counties cricket for Cheshire in 1949. Donald Smith's younger brother, Colin Stansfield Smith, played in 106 first-class cricket matches, mainly for Lancashire and for Cambridge University, and later became a well-known architect.
