= Ron Ward's Meadow With Tadley Pastures =

Protected area in Hampshire, England

Coordinates: 51°20′33″N 1°08′14″W

Ron Ward's Meadow With Tadley Pastures is a site of Site of Special Scientific Interest (SSSI). It is based on the edge of Tadley in Hampshire, England. It is managed by the Hampshire and Isle of Wight Wildlife Trust.

== Geography ==
Ron Ward's Meadow With Tadley Pastures covers an area of 11.3 hectares. The SSSI is an area of unimproved meadows which is managed for hay production. The main part of the site is meadows which are on a south-facing hillside sloping down towards Honeywell Brook. The meadows sit on a mixture of Bracklesham Beds, Lower Bagshot sands and alluvium. Opposite the meadows are two fields, which form the final part of the SSSI.

== History ==
The site was given to the trust as a legacy by Ron Ward. The area was classed in 1991 as a Site of Special Scientific Interest.

== Fauna ==
The site has the following fauna:

=== Mammals ===
- Roe deer
- European water vole
- Bank vole
- Yellow-necked mouse
- European hare

=== Birds ===
- Snipe
- Eurasian skylark
- Northern lapwing

=== Amphibians ===
- Common frog

=== Invertebrates ===
- Mother Shipton moth
- Burnet companion
- Small copper
- Common blue
- Straw dot moth

== Flora ==
The site has the following flora:

=== Trees ===
- Aspen
- Creeping willow

=== Plants ===
- Yarrow
- Sneezewort
- Common bent
- Bugle
- Bog pimpernel
- Sweet vernal grass
- False oat-grass
- Mugwort
- Quaking-grass
- Meadow brome
- Harebell
- Cuckooflower
- Distant sedge
- Brown sedge
- Common yellow-sedge
- Star sedge
- Glaucous sedge
- Hairy sedge
- smooth-stalked sedge
- Common sedge
- Oval sedge
- Pale sedge
- Carnation sedge
- Pill sage
- Common knapweed
- Meadow thistle
- Marsh thistle
- Crested dog's-tail
- Common spotted orchid
- Heath spotted-orchid
- Southern marsh-orchid
- Field horsetail
- Red fescue
- Meadowsweet
- Snakeshead fritillary
- Cut-leaved crane's-bill
- Dyer's greenweed
- Yorkshire fog
- Marsh pennywort
- Cats ear
- Yellow iris
- Field scabious
- Bitter vetch
- Meadow vetchling
- Oxeye daisy
- Common bird's-foot trefoil
- Greater bird's-foot trefoil
- Field wood-rush
- Ragged robin
- Purple moor-grass
- Wood melick
- Hemlock water-dropwort
- Adder's-tongue
- Green-winged orchid
- Common lousewort
- Ribwort plantain
- Tormentil
- Cowslip
- Common fleabane
- Meadow buttercup
- Great yellow-cress
- Common sorrel
- Greater burnet
- Saw-wort
- Betony
- Lesser stitchwort
- Devil's-bit scabious
- Goat's-beard
- Red clover
- Marsh arrowgrass
- Marsh valerian
- Germander speedwell
- Hairy tare
- Narrow-leaved vetch
- Common vetch
