= Landstraße =

Coordinates: 48°11′47″N 16°23′45″E

Landstraße Laundstrossn (Bavarian)
- 3rd District of Vienna
- Coat of arms

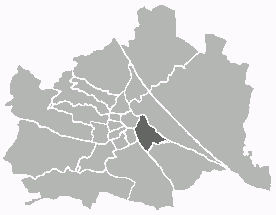
- Location of the district within Vienna
- Country: Austria
- City: Vienna

Government
  - District Director: Erich Hohenberger (SPÖ)
  - First Deputy: Rudolf Zabrana (SPÖ)
  - Second Deputy: Werner Grebner (FPÖ)
  - Representation (56 Members): SPÖ 22, Greens 15, FPÖ 7, NEOS 7, ÖVP 6, KPÖ 3

Area
  - Total: 7.42 km^{2} (2.86 sq mi)

Population (2016-01-01)
  - Total: 89,834
  - Density: 12,100/km^{2} (31,400/sq mi)
- Postal code: A-1030
- Address of District Office: Karl-Borromäus-Platz 3 A-1030 Wien
- Website: www.wien.gv.at/bezirke/landstrasse/

Landstraße (Austrian German pronunciation: [ˈlandˌʃtraːsɛ]; Viennese: Laundstrossn; "Country Road") is the 3rd municipal district of Vienna, Austria (German: 3. Bezirk). It is near the center of Vienna and was established in the 19th century. Landstraße is a heavily populated urban area with many workers and residential homes. It has 89,834 inhabitants in an area of 7.42 km^{2} (2.86 sq mi). It has existed since about 1200 AD. In 1192, the English king Richard the Lionheart was captured in the Erdberg neighbourhood, after the unsuccessful Third Crusade.

To tourists, Landstraße is mostly known for the 18th-century castle and gardens of Belvedere, the residence of Eugene of Savoy, which today houses the Austrian Gallery. Another residence was built by the Russian envoy to Vienna, Count Razumovsky. A more recent point of interest is the Hundertwasserhaus block of flats (apartment block) designed in a dream-like style by the architect and painter Friedensreich Hundertwasser. Museums in Landstraße include the KunstHausWien ("Vienna art house", also designed by Hundertwasser) and the Museum of Art Fakes. The St. Marx Cemetery in Landstraße contains the grave of Wolfgang Amadeus Mozart.

Austrian Chancellor Metternich (1773–1859) once remarked, "The Balkans begin at the Rennweg", which was then a mere road in Landstraße, out of Vienna towards the east.

In 1787, Leopold Mozart, the father of Wolfgang Amadeus Mozart, remarked to Wolfgang's sister, Nannerl Mozart, that her brother had moved to Landstraße, which was at the time outside Vienna's city walls. Leopold included a comment ("Unfortunately, I can guess [why]."), suggesting that Wolfgang's move was perhaps due to a less-than-ideal financial situation.

== Geography ==
Landstraße District is located in the southeastern city center of Vienna. It has an area of 7.42 km^{2}, or 1.8% of the city of Vienna. This district is in the middle of Vienna's municipal districts. For one of the "interior districts" the district has a comparatively high proportion of greenery. The district lies along several terraces of the Danube, where the Danube Canal forms the eastern and the Vienna River the northwestern border. In the south of the district, Laaer Berg borders Landstraße.

== Sights ==
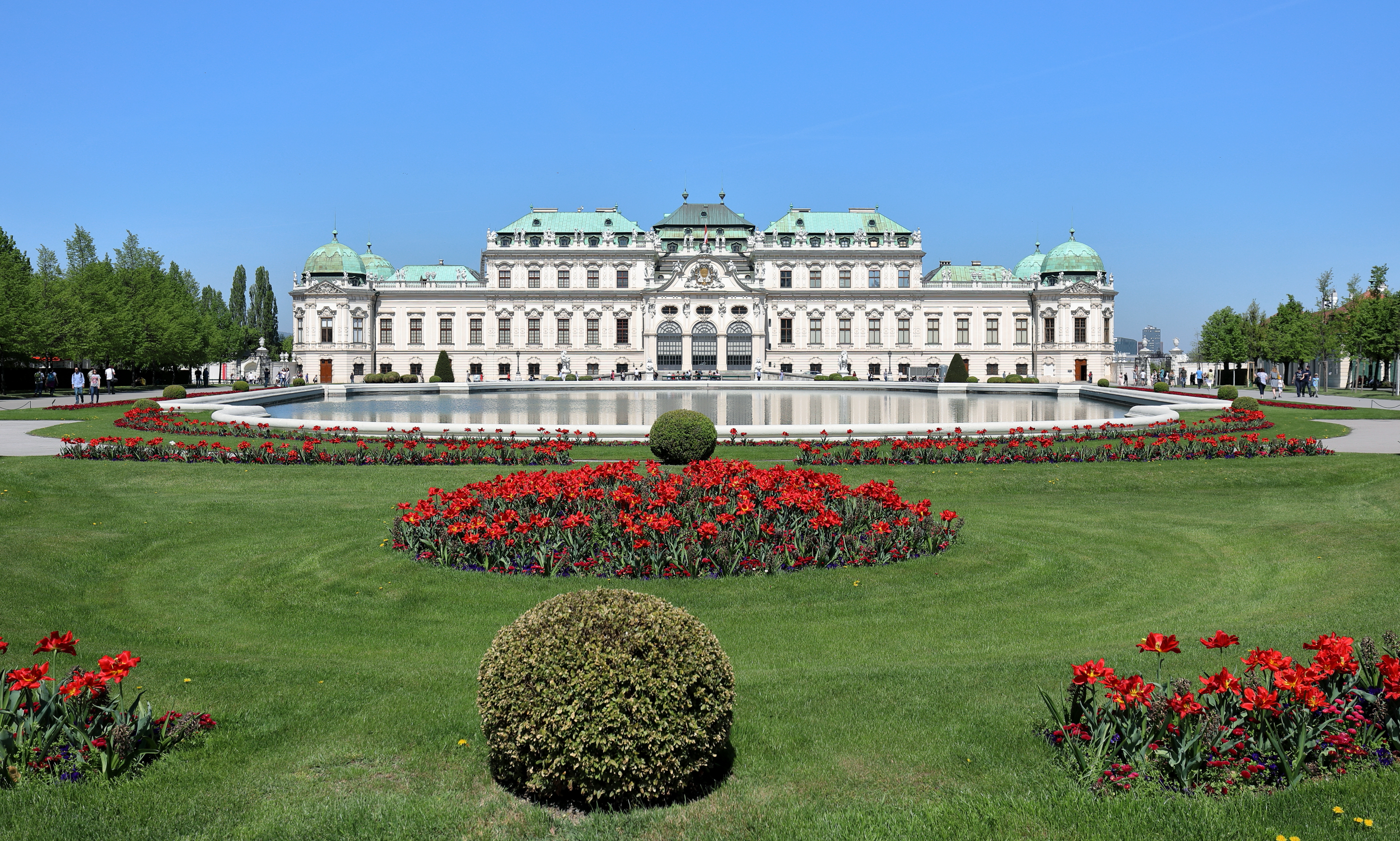
Belvedere Palace

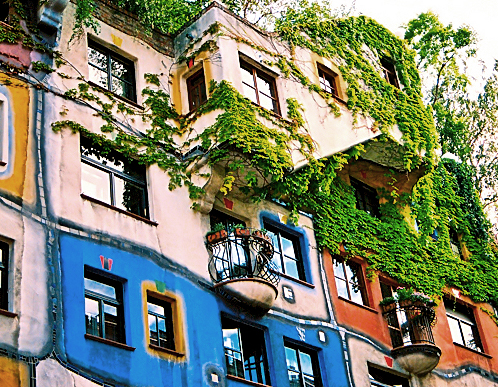
The Hundertwasserhaus

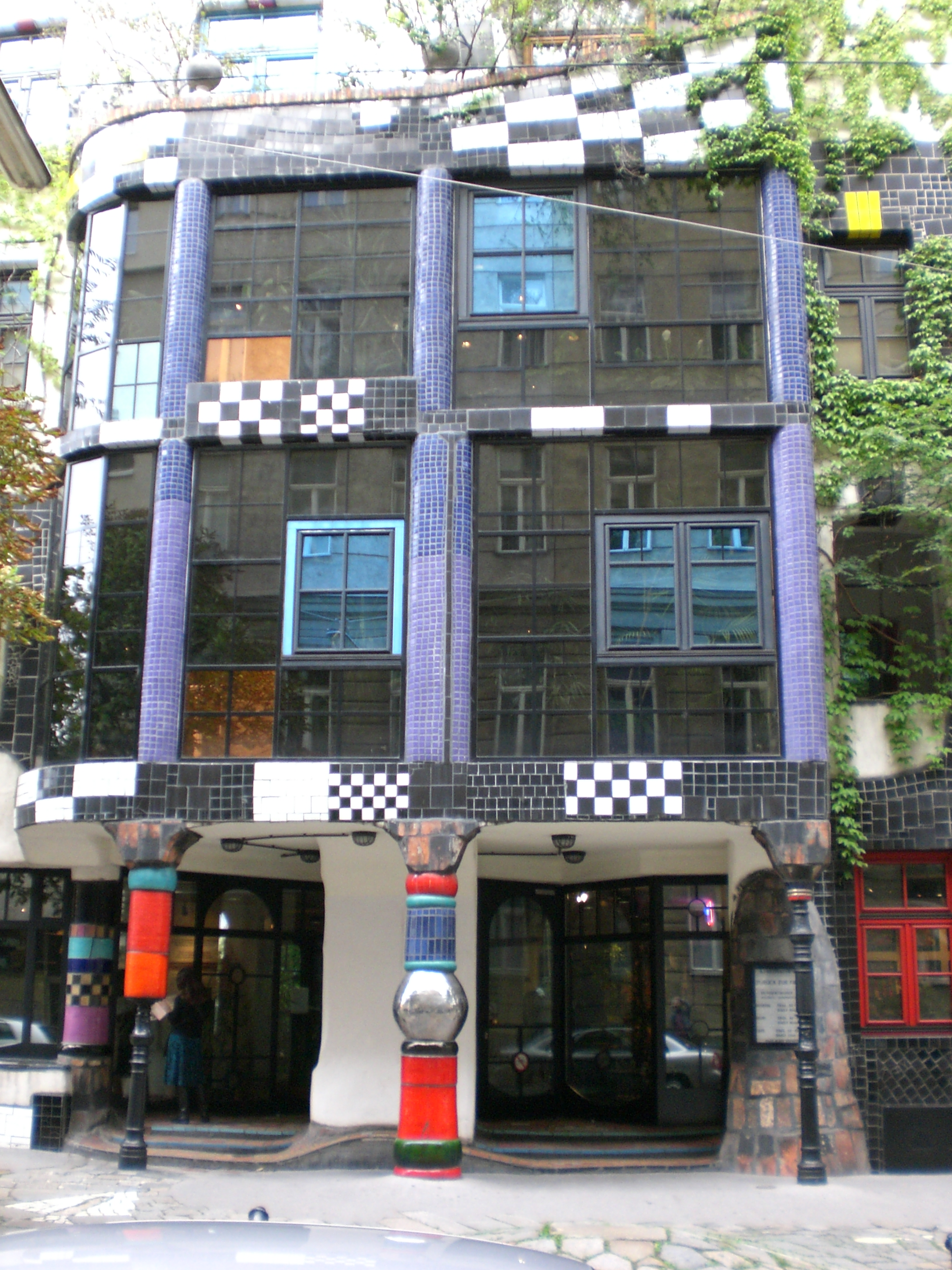
KunstHausWien

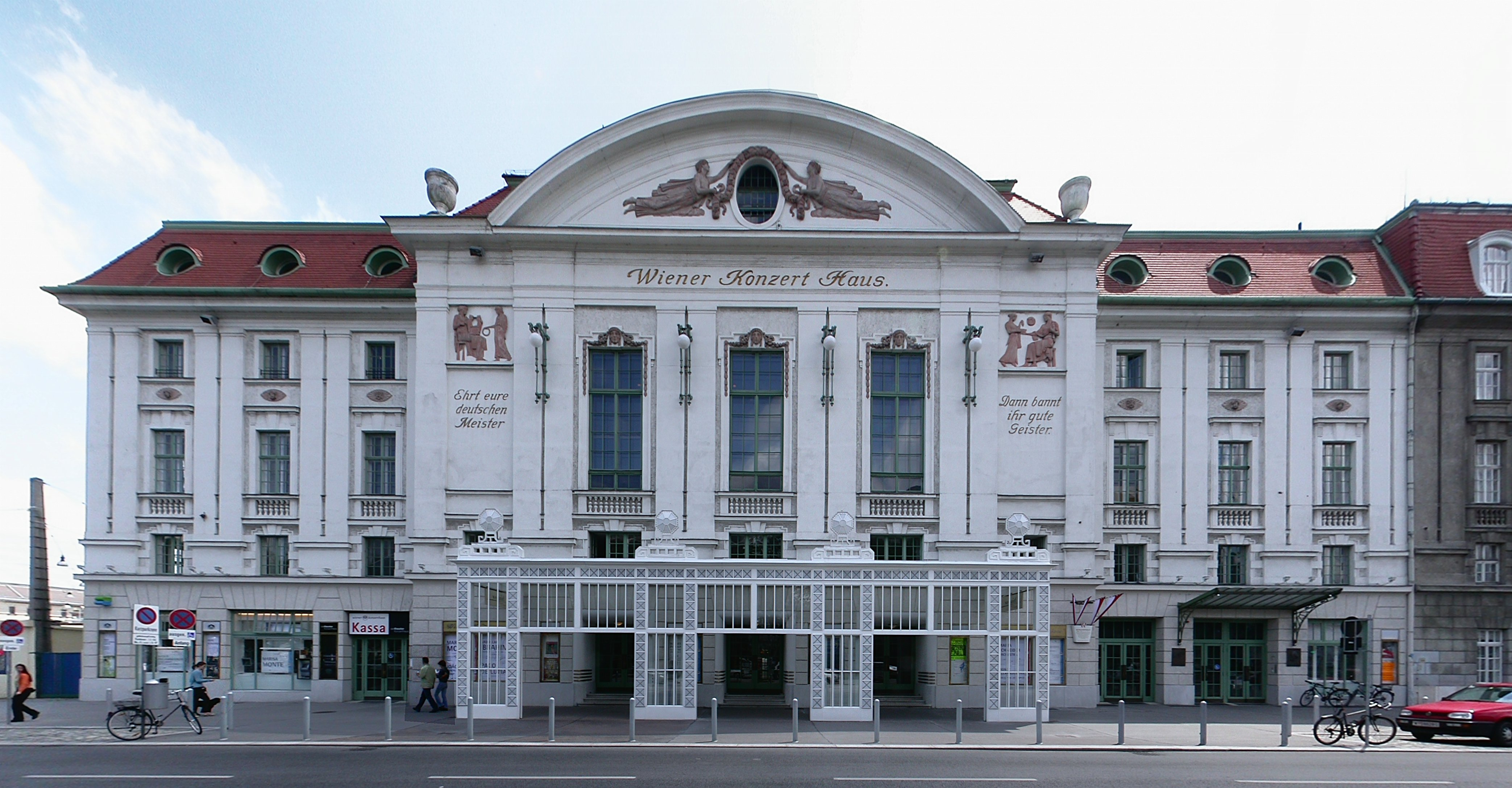
Vienna Concert Hall

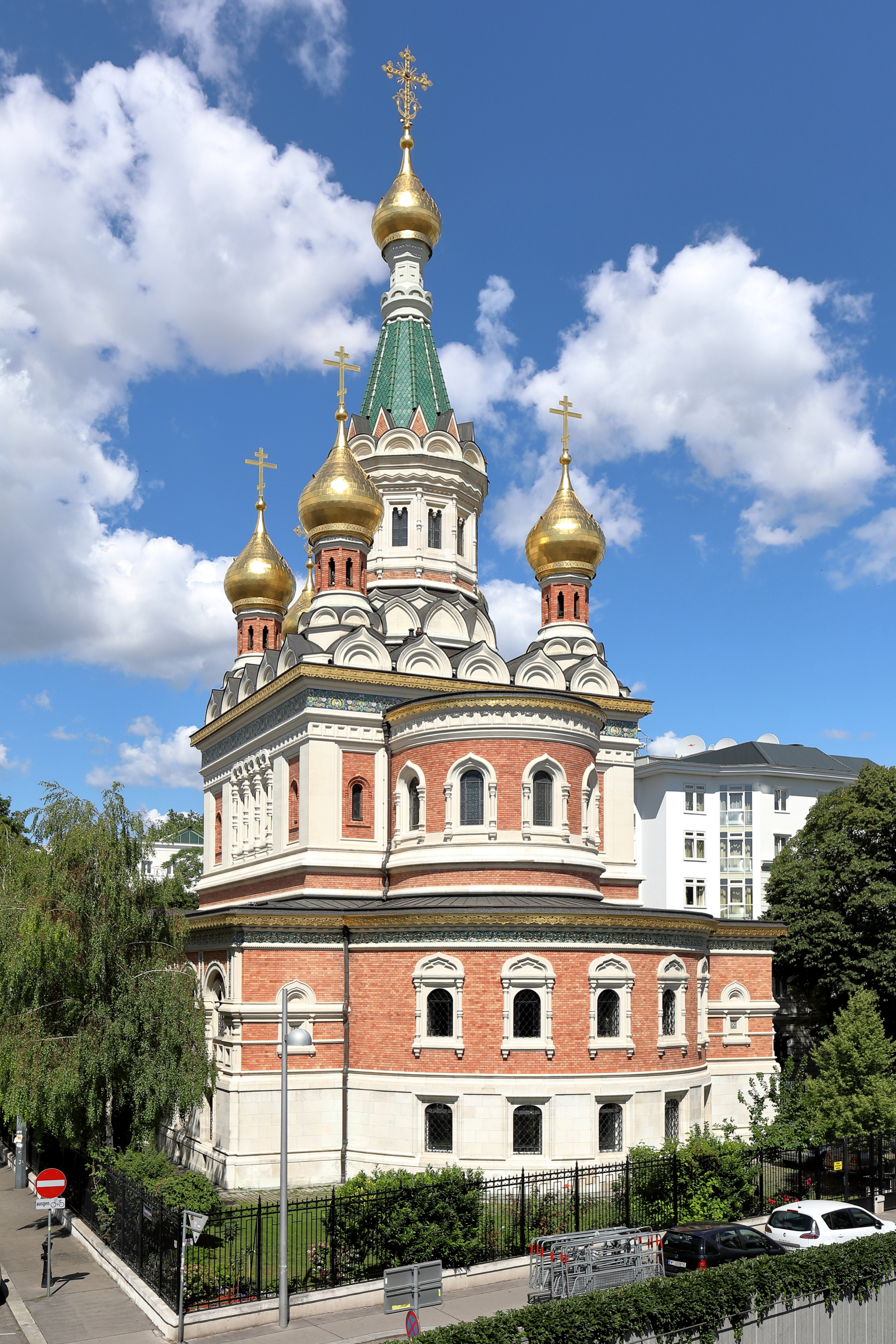
Russian Orthodox Cathedral (Russisch-orthodoxe Kathedrale (Wien))

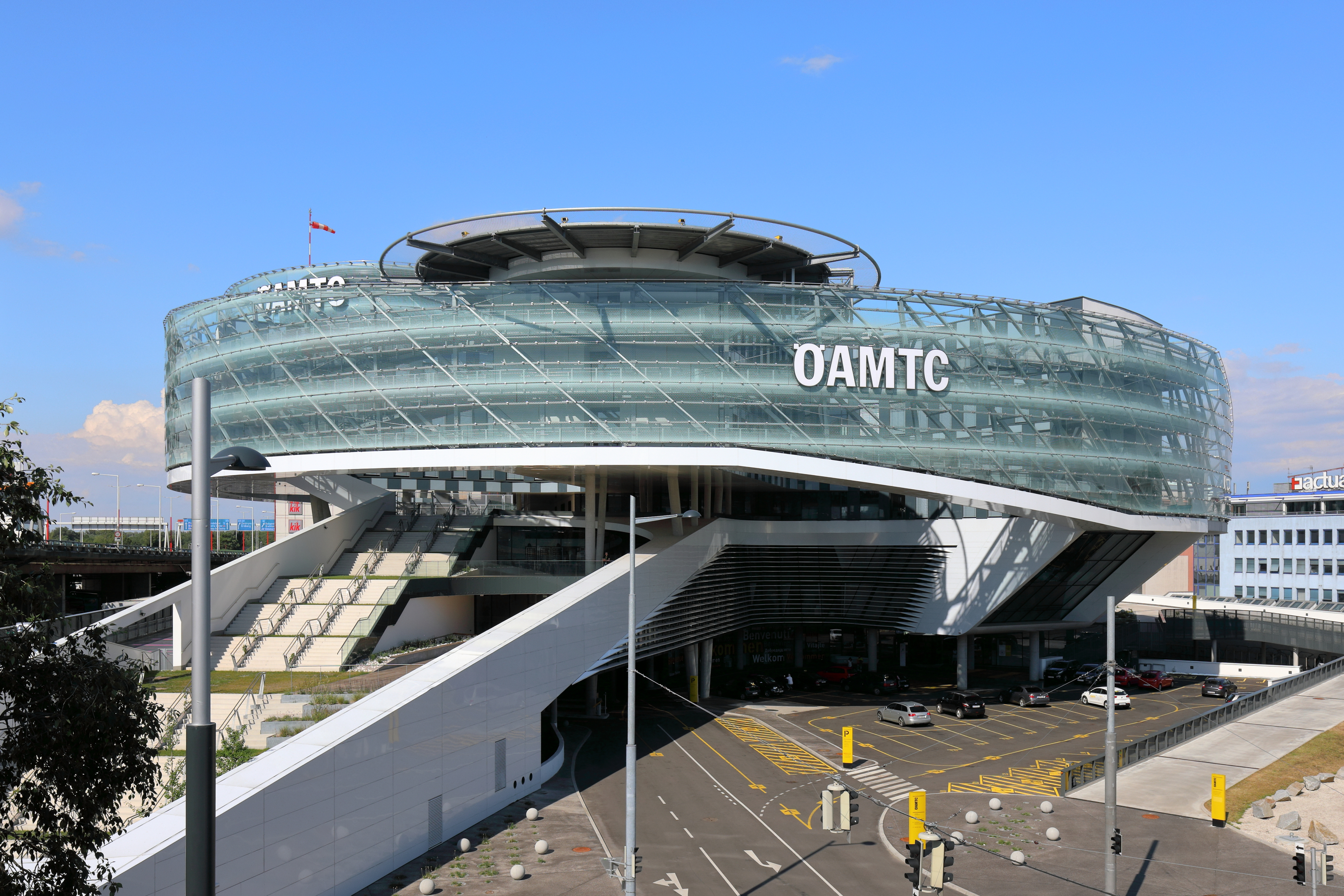
Headquarters of Austrian automobile club OeAMTC

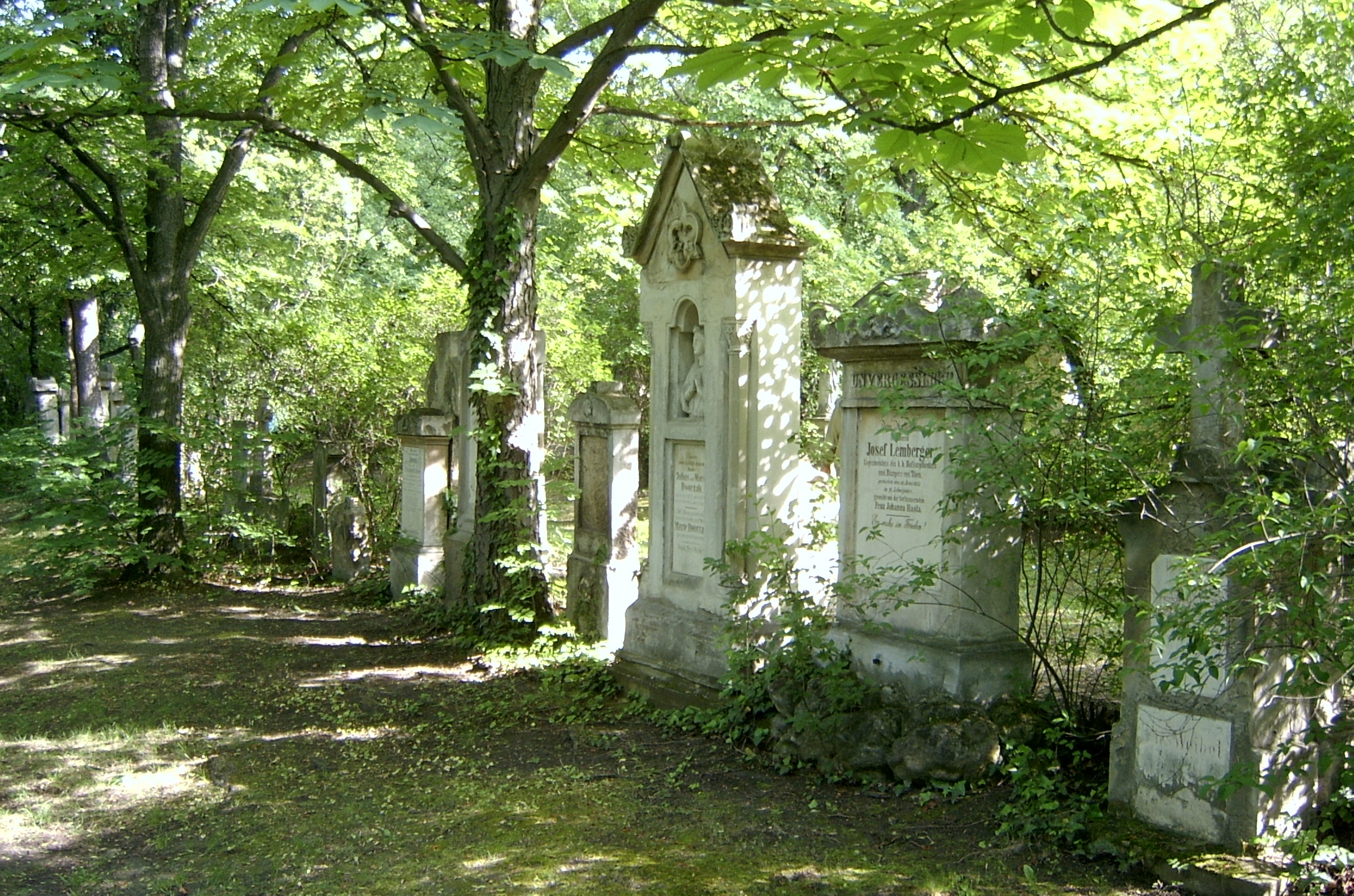
St. Marx Cemetery

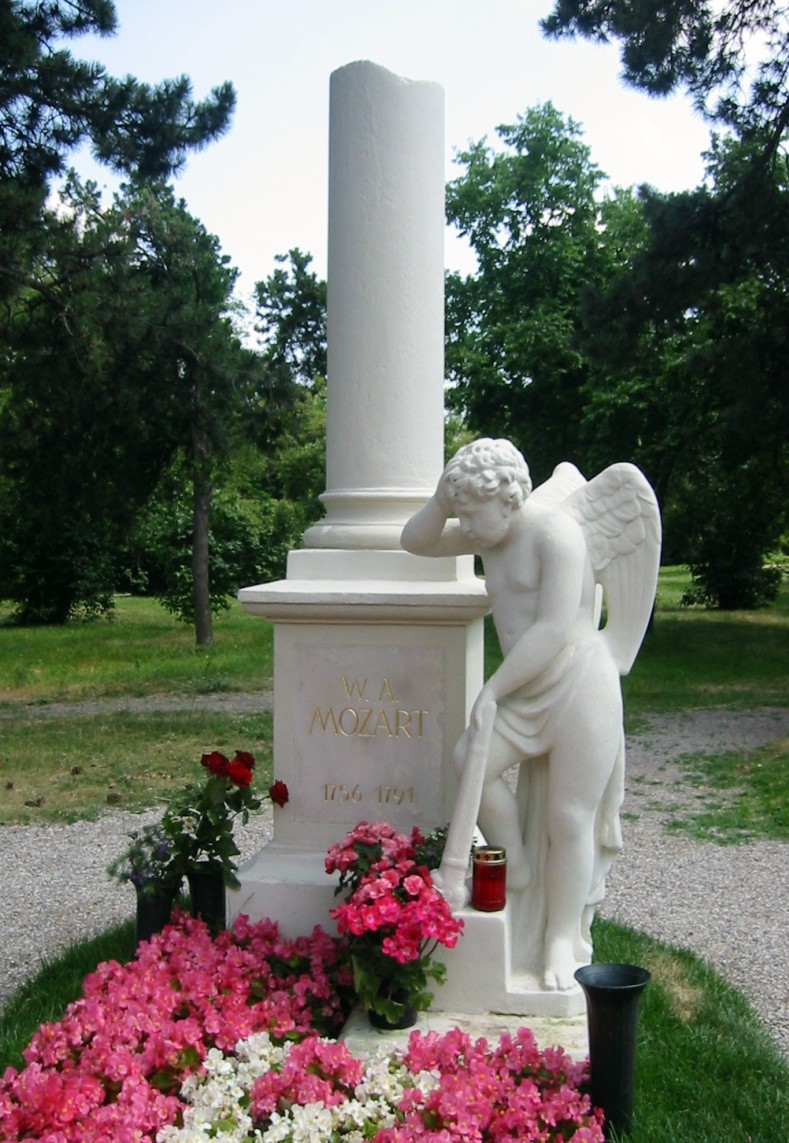
Mozart memorial in St. Marx Cemetery
