= Hundertwasserhaus =

Expressionist apartment house in Vienna, Austria

Coordinates: 48°12′26″N 16°23′39″E

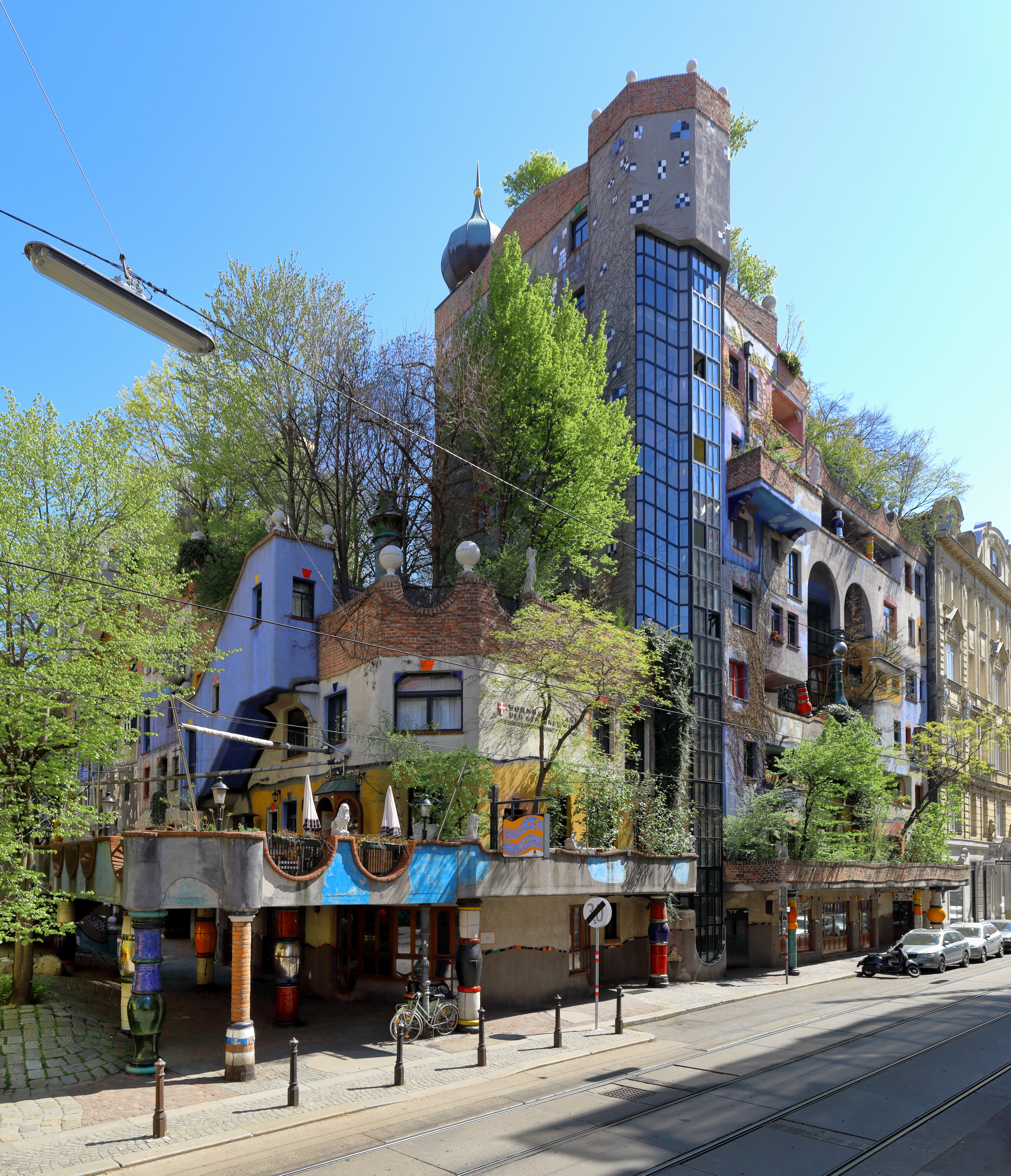
The Hundertwasserhaus

The Hundertwasserhaus ("Hundertwasser house") is an apartment house in Vienna, Austria, completed in 1985, after the idea and concept of Austrian artist Friedensreich Hundertwasser.

== Outline ==
This expressionist landmark of Vienna is located in the Landstraße district on the corner of Kegelgasse and Löwengasse (Kegel/Löwen street). The Hundertwasserhaus is one of Vienna's most visited buildings and has become part of Austria's cultural heritage.

== Hundertwasser and architecture ==
Friedensreich Hundertwasser started out as a painter. Starting in the early 1950s, however, he increasingly became focused on architecture, writing and reading in public, advocating natural forms of decay. In 1972, he had his first architectural models made for the TV show Wünsch dir was ("Make a wish"), in order to demonstrate his ideas on forested roofs, "tree tenants" and the "window right" of every tenant to embellish the facade around his windows. In these models Hundertwasser also developed new architectural shapes, such as the "eye-slit" house and the "high-rise meadow house".

In lectures at academies and before architectural associations, Hundertwasser elucidated his concerns regarding an architecture in harmony with nature and man. Bruno Kreisky, the federal chancellor at the time, suggested in a letter dated 30 November 1977 to Leopold Gratz, the mayor of Vienna, that Hundertwasser be given the opportunity to realize his ideas in the field of architecture by allowing him to build a housing project, whereupon Leopold Gratz, in a letter of 15 December 1977, invited Hundertwasser to create an apartment building according to his own ideas.

To this end, architect Josef Zhongli Krawina was invited to join the artist and to help him to put his ideas into practice.

== Conflict and cooperation ==
In August and September 1979, architect Krawina presented to Hundertwasser his preliminary drawings and a Styrofoam model. Hundertwasser was shocked and rejected them as representing exactly the leveling, straight-lined modular grid against which he had consistently fought. (Note: Images in .) As his model of the "Terrace House" for Eurovision showed, he had already conceptualized a quite different type of house.

In the end the house was built between 1983 and 1985 according to the ideas and concepts of Hundertwasser with architect Univ.-Prof. Joseph Krawina as a co-author and architect Peter Pelikan as a planner. It features undulating floors, (Note: "An uneven floor is a divine melody to the feet") a roof covered with earth and grass, and large trees growing from inside the rooms, with limbs extending from windows. Hundertwasser took no payment for the design of the house, declaring that it was worth it, to prevent something ugly from going up in its place.

Within the house there are 53 apartments, four offices, 16 private terraces and three communal terraces, and a total of 250 trees and bushes.

== Court decision ==
In 2001, 20 years after architect Krawina's exit from the project, the company H.B. Medienvertriebsgesellschaft mbH under its business manager Harald Böhm encouraged architect Krawina to legally substantiate his claim as co-creator of the Hundertwasserhaus. On 11 March 2010, after eight years of litigation, Austria's Supreme Court of Justice ruled Josef Krawina, along with Friedensreich Hundertwasser, to be co-creators of the house with the effect that it is now forbidden for the Hundertwasser Non-Profit Foundation to disseminate any illustration or replica of the house without acknowledging Krawina as co-creator.

According to the ruling, Hundertwasser was the sole spiritual creator (German: Geistiger Schöpfer) of the building, however, Krawina must be recognized as a co-creator of equal standing and be paid an equal share in royalty receipts.

== Pictures ==
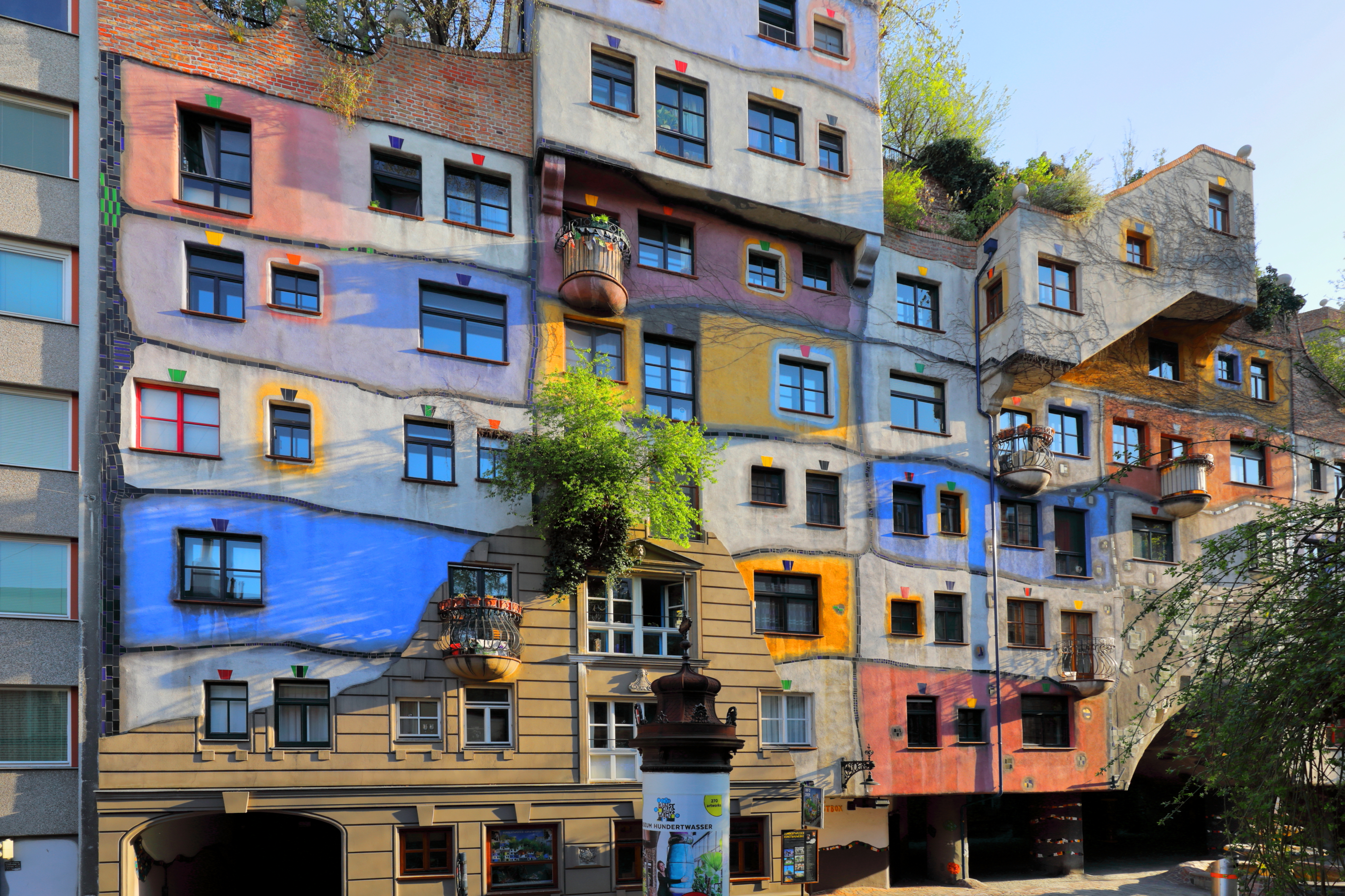
Facade Kegelgasse

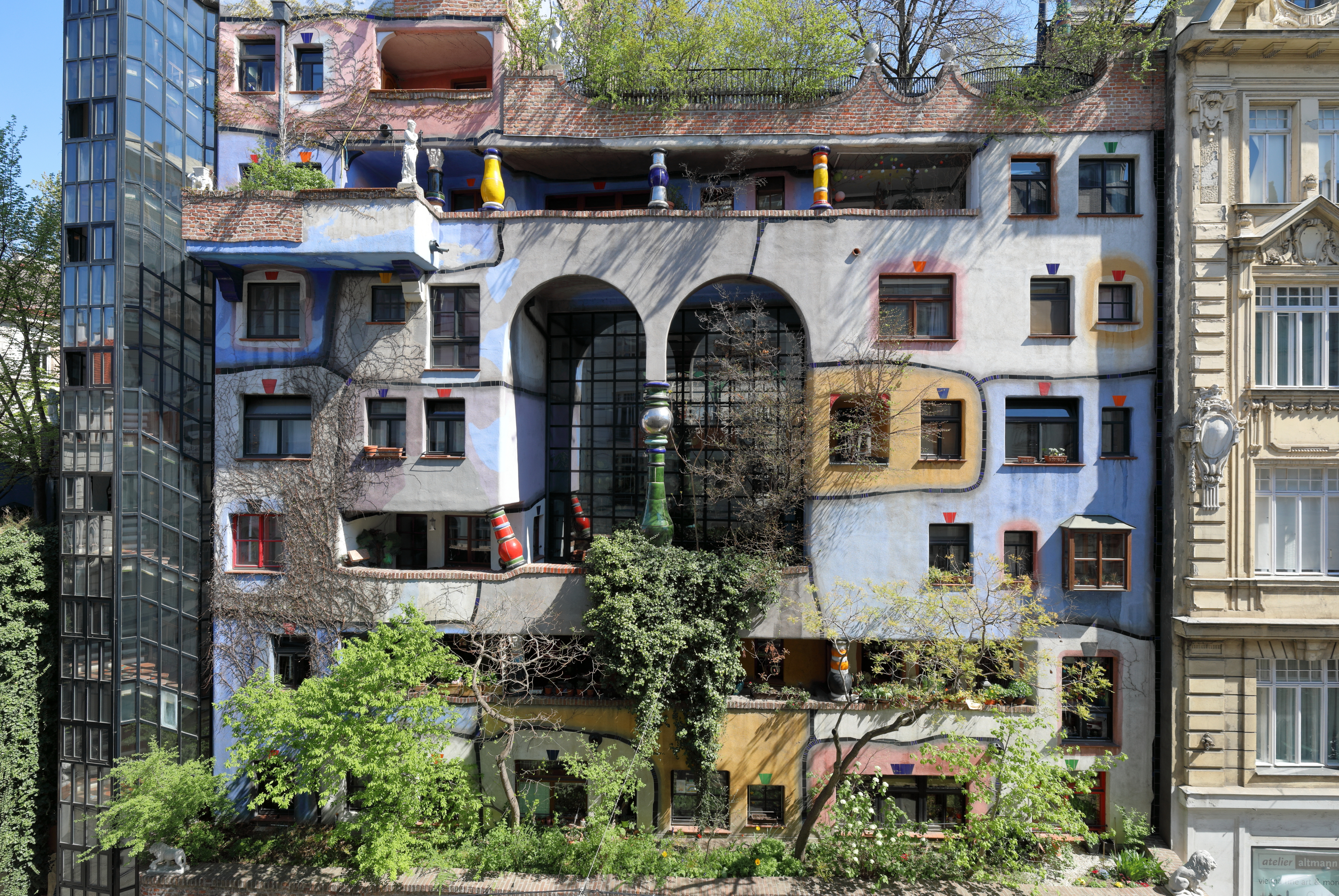
Facade Löwengasse

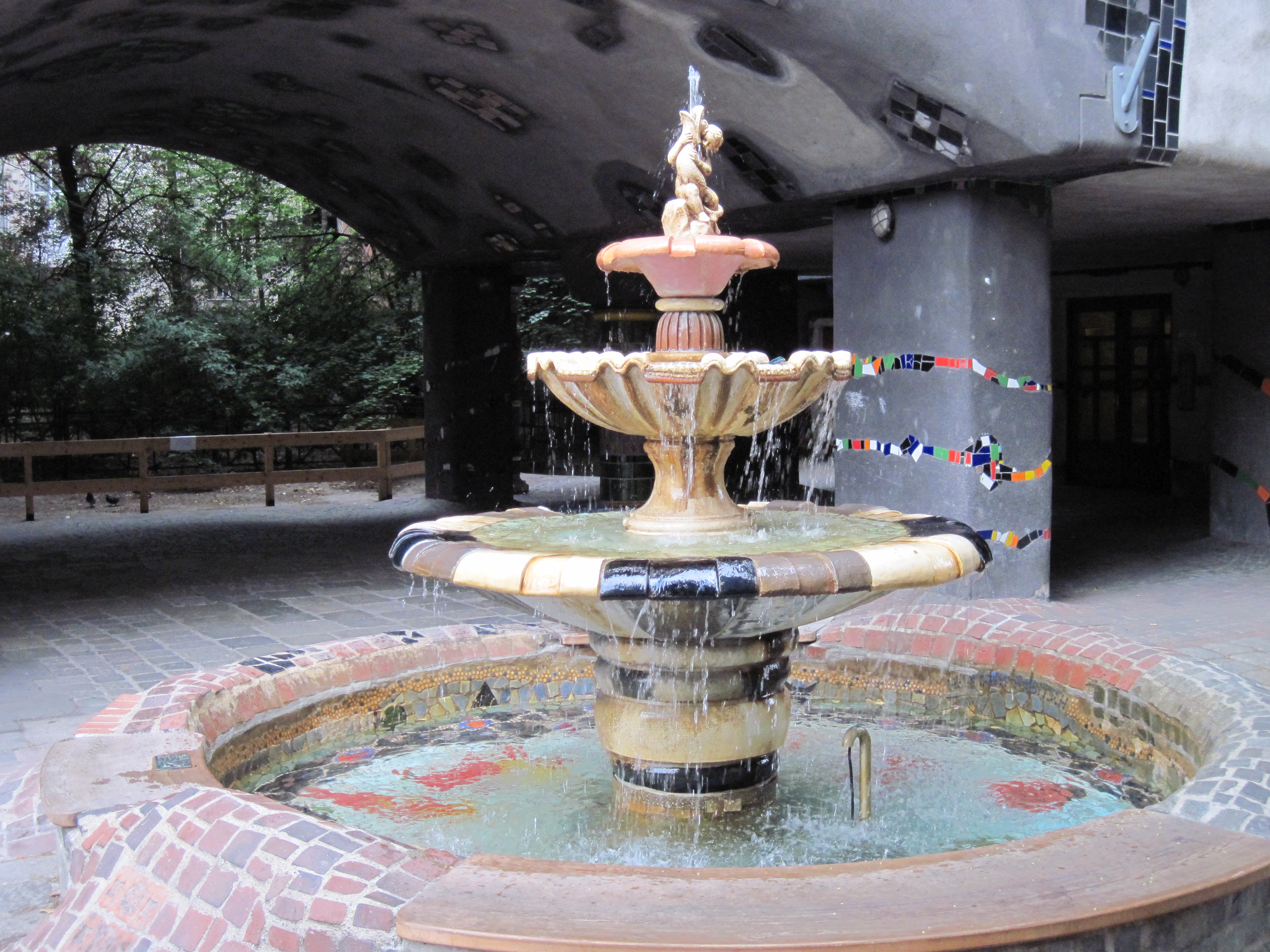
Fountain

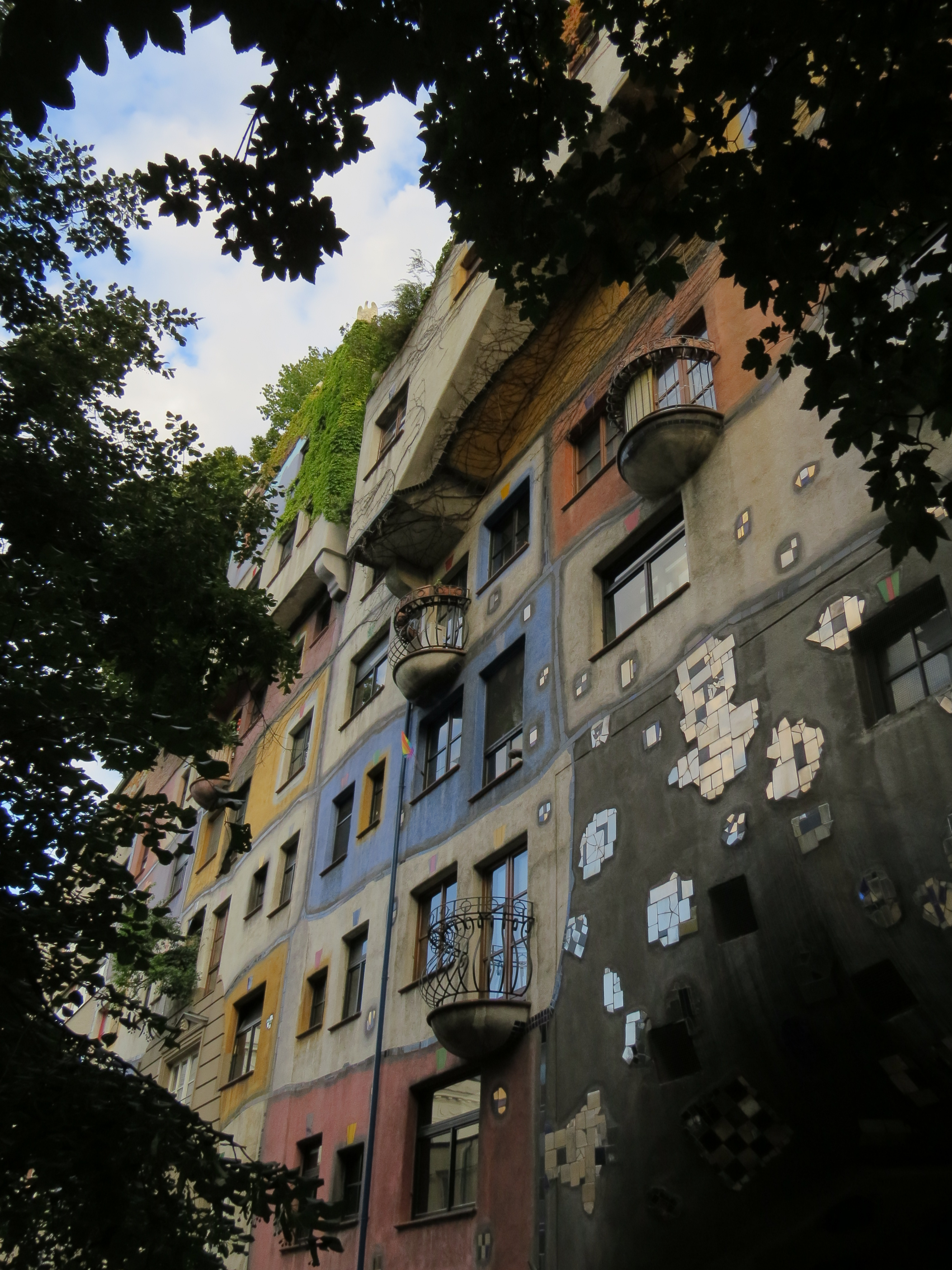

== Bibliography ==
- Habarta, Gerhard; Schmied, Wieland (1985). Das Hundertwasser Haus. Wien: Österreichischer Bundesverlag.
- Stallein, Rudi (17 January 2002). "Hundertwasser-Bauwerke: Sehenswürdigkeiten in einem Rausch aus Farben und Formen". FAZ.NET (in German).
- Brikcius, Eugen (18 January 2005). "Österreichische Spaziergänge" (PDF). Die Entzauberte Idylle (in German): 636–646. ISBN 978-3-7001-3261-5.
- Hundertwasser, Friedensreich; Fürst, Andrea Christa (2007). Taschen, Angelika (ed.). Hundertwasser Architecture: for a More Humane Architecture in Harmony with Nature. Translated by Philip Mattson; Maureen Roycroft Sommer (rev ed.). Hongkong; Los Angeles: Taschen. ISBN 9783822885642. OCLC 191258841.
- Kommenda, Benedikt (16 May 2010). "OGH: Hundertwasser-Haus ist auch von Josef Krawina". Die Presse (in German). Archived from the original on 11 January 2011.
