= Council architect =

Architect working for a local authority

A council architect or municipal architect (properly titled county architect, borough architect, city architect or district architect) is an architect employed by a local authority. The name of the position varies depending on the type of local authority and is similar to that of county surveyor or chief engineer used by some authorities. Council architects are employed in the United Kingdom but also used in Malta and Ireland.

== History ==
The role was once widespread with many counties, cities and other local authorities employing their own architect to design public works. Council architects acted as designer, client and regulator for their authority, and having significant buying power, they were able to influence suppliers to accommodate their requirements. They worked closely with the council planning department, with whom they were often co-located. In 1953, the London County Council (LCC) employed more than 1,500 people within its architects department.

The LCC architects were key innovators, with the guaranteed salary and relative anonymity allowing them to develop experimental designs without risk to income or the stigma of failure. The LCC architects department also provided research funding, including for the Survey of London, and had in-house testing and development teams. The smaller scale firms in private practice at the time could not provide such luxuries.

== Current role ==
The trend in recent decades has been for councils to close their architects departments. As of 2015, there were 237 council architects in England, 159 in Scotland and 24 in Wales. The biggest employers are Hampshire (44), Glasgow (18), the Highland Council (13) and Lancashire (11). Despite their predecessors having one of the largest and most active architects departments in the country, no London borough now employs more than five council architects.

Once closed, a local authority is highly unlikely to revive an architects department and will instead rely on outsourcing to private firms. One exception is the London Borough of Croydon, which re-established a council architect position in 2015. Hampshire County Architects remains the largest council architects department, and is recognized as a leader in its field, winning several awards for its school designs since the 1980s.
