= Tadley =

Town in Hampshire, England

Coordinates: 51.3506°N 1.1376°W

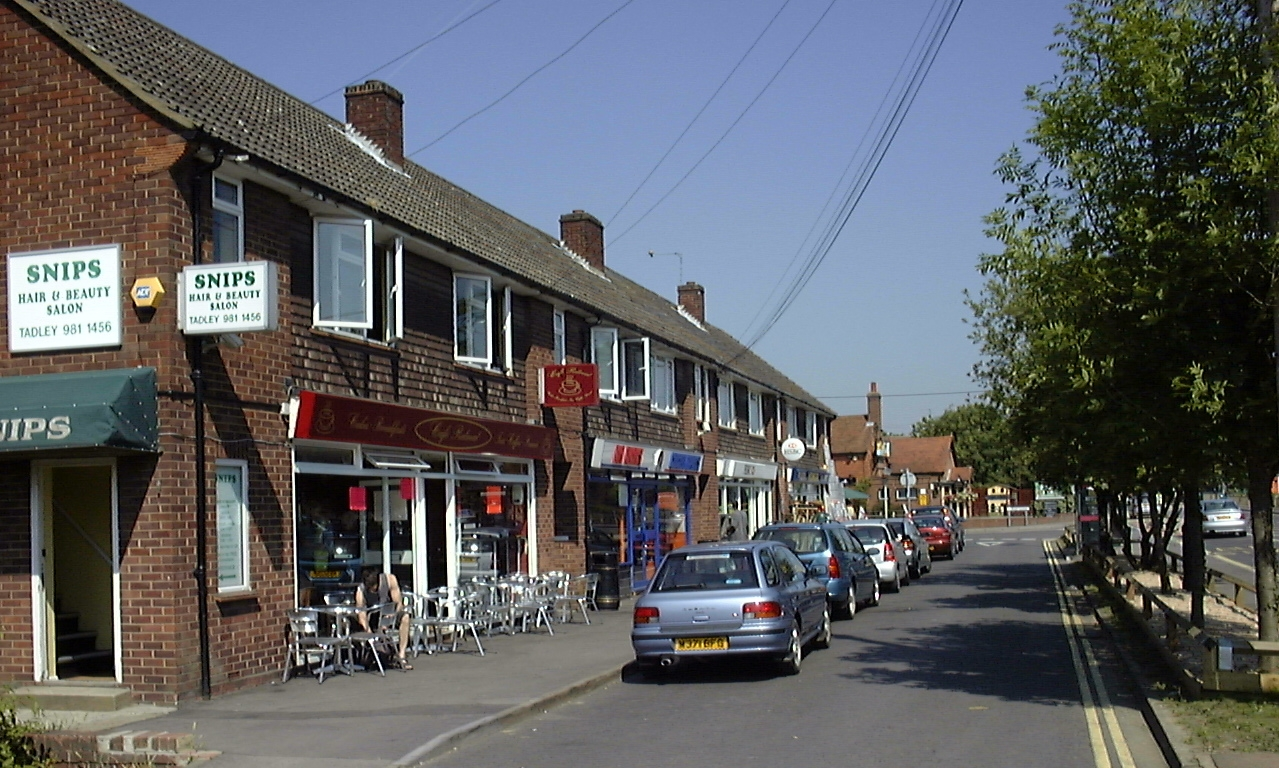
- Shops on Mulfords Hill

- Location within Hampshire
- Population: 11,473
- OS grid reference: SU601616
- Civil parish: Tadley
- District: Basingstoke and Deane
- Shire county: Hampshire
- Region: South East
- Country: England
- Sovereign state: United Kingdom
- Post town: TADLEY
- Postcode district: RG26
- Dialling code: 0118
- Police: Hampshire and Isle of Wight
- Fire: Hampshire and Isle of Wight
- Ambulance: South Central
- UK Parliament: North West Hampshire
- Website: Tadley Town Council

Tadley is a town and civil parish in the Basingstoke and Deane district of Hampshire, England, 5.5 miles (8.9 km) north of Basingstoke and 11 miles (17 km) south west of Reading. The population of Tadley stands around 11,000.

During the 1950s and 1960s, the Atomic Weapons Research Establishment (AWRE), now known as AWE, became the area's largest employer, and many houses were built during this period to accommodate AWRE workers. Though the establishment was located in the parish of Aldermaston, most of these houses were built in Tadley.

== History ==
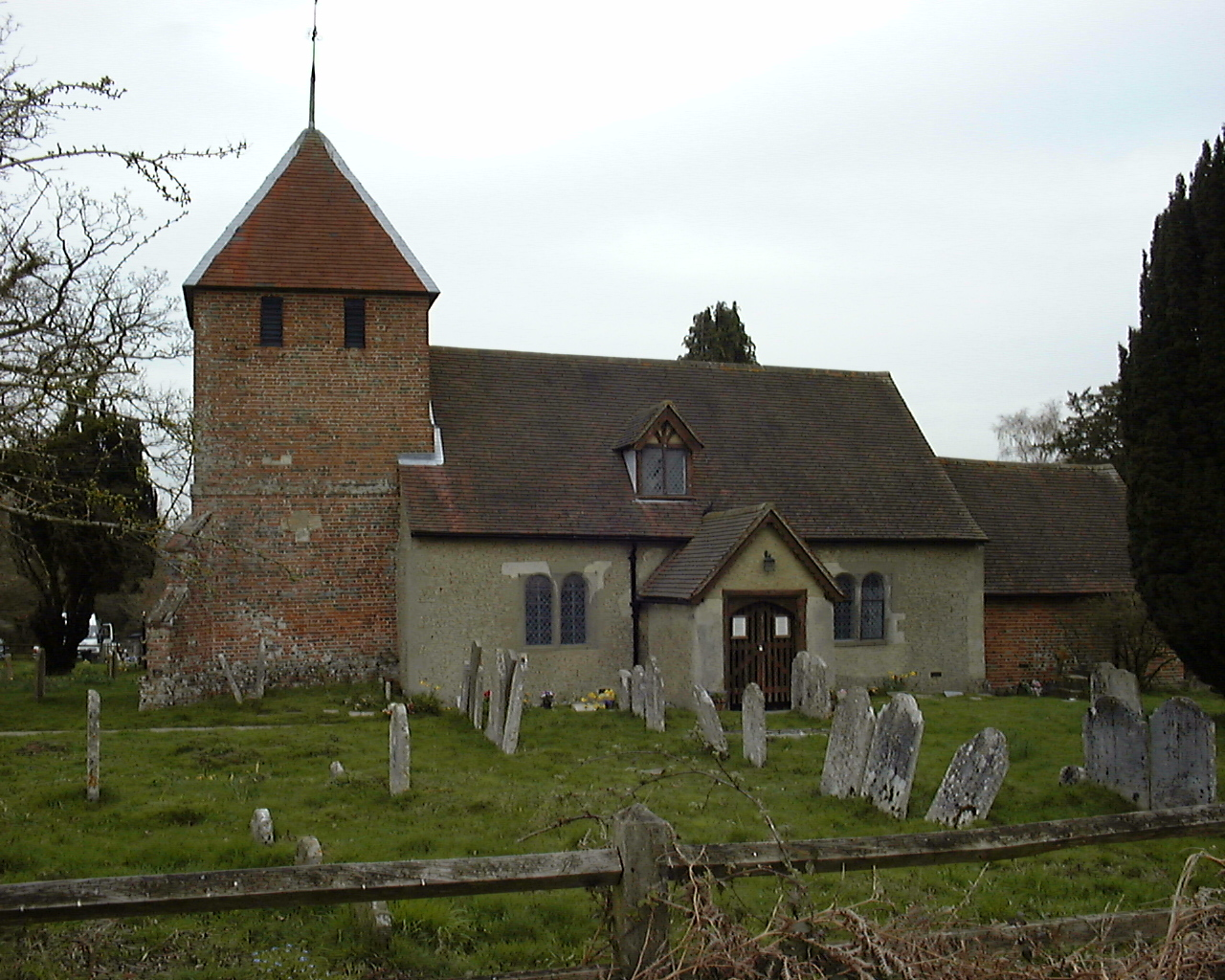
St. Peter's church

The origin of the name is uncertain. In old maps and books Tadley can be found spelled as Taddanleage, Tederlei, Titherley, Tudurley, Tadel and Taddeley. As with many other rural British communities, it is assumed that the village began as a clearing in the dense forest which at one time covered the greater part of England. In Old English, Tadde means 'Toad' or 'Frog' and ley being 'a clearing in the woods', so it possibly means "a clearing in the woods with frogs". Most sources, however, say that the name means "woodland clearing of a man called Tada".

In 909, Edward the Elder granted the 'Manor of Overton' to Frithestan, Bishop of Winchester. In the confirmation of this a wood at Tadley is mentioned. The village is mentioned frequently in documents relating to the grant. There was an independent estate in the parish called the 'Manor of Tadley' but later was known as the 'Manor of Withford or Wyford'. In 1166 this property was held by William Hotot. He was succeeded by his son, Robert Hotot in 1205. The first reference to a church at Tadley is in 1286 when Andrew Hotot is recorded as owning the manor and church.

Tadley Place on Church Lane is a Grade II listed building which includes part of the former Tudor manor house. It was the home of the 17th century MP Sir Henry Ludlow.

== Governance ==
Tadley is a civil parish with an elected town council Tadley Town Council which consists of 4 parish wards, Central Tadley, South Tadley, North Tadley and East Tadley. These occupy some or all of three wards of Basingstoke and Deane District Council, being Baughurst and Tadley North, Tadley Central and Tadley South. Tadley falls within the area of Basingstoke and Deane Borough Council and of Hampshire County Council and all three councils are responsible for different aspects of local government.

== Geography ==
Tadley lies next to the northern border of Hampshire, where it meets Berkshire.

It is 6 miles (9.7 km) north of Basingstoke, 10 miles (16 km) south west of the town of Reading and 10 miles (16 km) south east of Newbury.

Nearby villages are Aldermaston, Baughurst, Pamber Heath, Heath End, Bramley, Mortimer Common and Silchester.

On the edge of Tadley is a Site of Special Scientific Interest (SSSI) called Ron Ward's Meadow With Tadley Pastures.

== Economy ==
The growth in shopping facilities has been slower than the growth in the population. Though there are shops in small groups throughout the town, there are only two significantly-sized shops, both supermarkets.

The main shopping areas in Tadley are on Mulfords Hill and Bishopswood Road, though there are isolated shops in other parts of the town and parish. A notable business in Mulfords Hill is that of the Royal Warrant Holder for Besom Brooms and Pea Sticks, also supplying besom brooms for the Harry Potter series of films.

== Culture and community ==
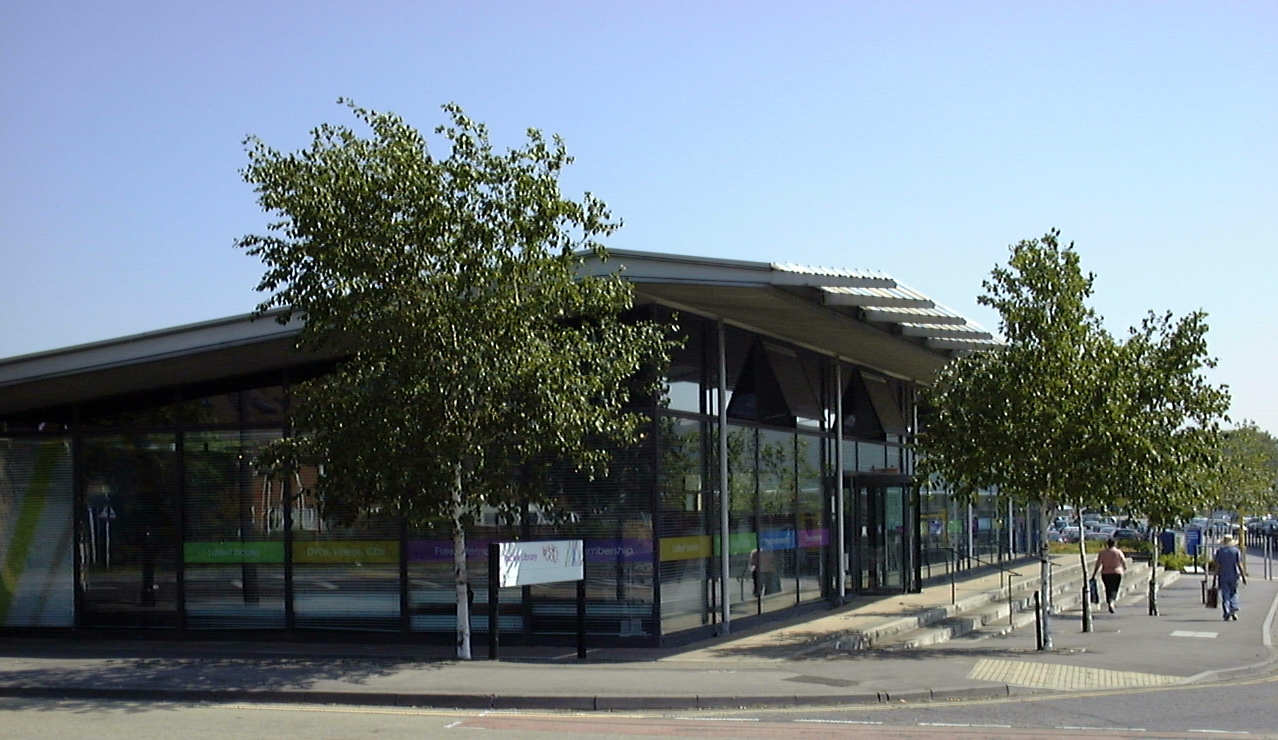
Tadley Library

Hampshire County Council built a new library for Tadley in 1994. It was opened on 12 October 1994 by Dame Mary Fagan, the Lord Lieutenant of Hampshire.

A local legend dating from the late 19th century claims that there were treacle mines located in the village, and until well into the 20th century the locals were referred to as "Tadley Treacle Miners". Tadley holds an annual "Treacle Fair" in honour of this legend in early June. It is organised by the Loddon Valley Lions Club, a member of Lions Club International.

== Sport and leisure ==
Tadley has a Non-League football club Tadley Calleva F.C., which plays at Barlow's Park. Tadley RFC is an amateur rugby club based at Frank Jose Park, Red Lane.

== Media ==
Local news and television programmes are provided by BBC South and ITV Meridian. Television signals are received from the Hannington TV transmitter.

Local radio stations are BBC Radio Berkshire on 104.1 FM, Heart South on 102.9 FM and Greatest Hits Radio Berkshire & North Hampshire on 107.6 FM.

The town is served by the local newspapers Basingstoke Gazette, Basingstoke Observer and Hampshire Chronicle.

The 2016 film David Brent: Life on the Road references the radio station Tadley FM. This is a now defunct community radio station.

== Transport ==
=== Road ===
The main road through the town is the A340, which begins in Basingstoke 6 miles (10 km) to the south and ends in Pangbourne in Berkshire, 10 miles (16 km) north of Tadley.

=== Bus ===
Tadley is served by Stagecoach South with a regular service to Basingstoke.

=== Rail ===
Tadley does not have a railway station, but is served by Aldermaston (5 miles (8.0 km) north), Bramley (5 miles (8.0 km) south east) and Basingstoke (7 miles (11 km) south).

== Education ==
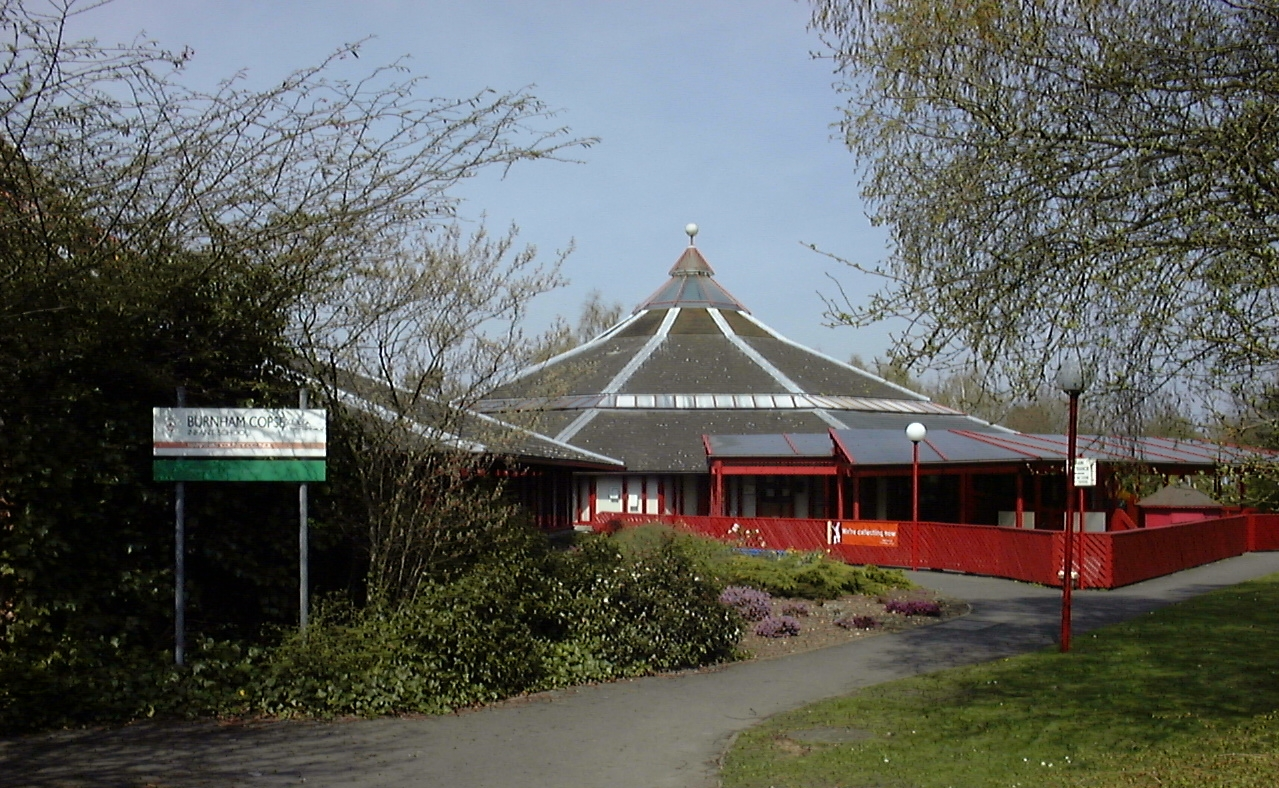
Burnham Copse Infant School

Children aged 11 to 16 that receive state-funded education are likely to attend The Hurst School, though this school is actually located in the adjacent village of Baughurst.

Primary schools in the area include Bishopswood Infant and Junior Schools, Burnham Copse Primary School, Silchester Church of England Primary School, Tadley Community Primary School, and The Priory Primary School.

== Notable residents ==
Dean Horrix, was part of the Reading football team that won promotion to the Football League Third Division in 1984 and the Football League Second Division in 1986, lived in Tadley. He remained in the area after leaving Reading for Millwall in 1988 and being transferred to Bristol City in early 1990.

== See also ==
- List of places in Hampshire
- List of civil parishes in Hampshire
