= Hampshire County Architects =

Architecture and design department

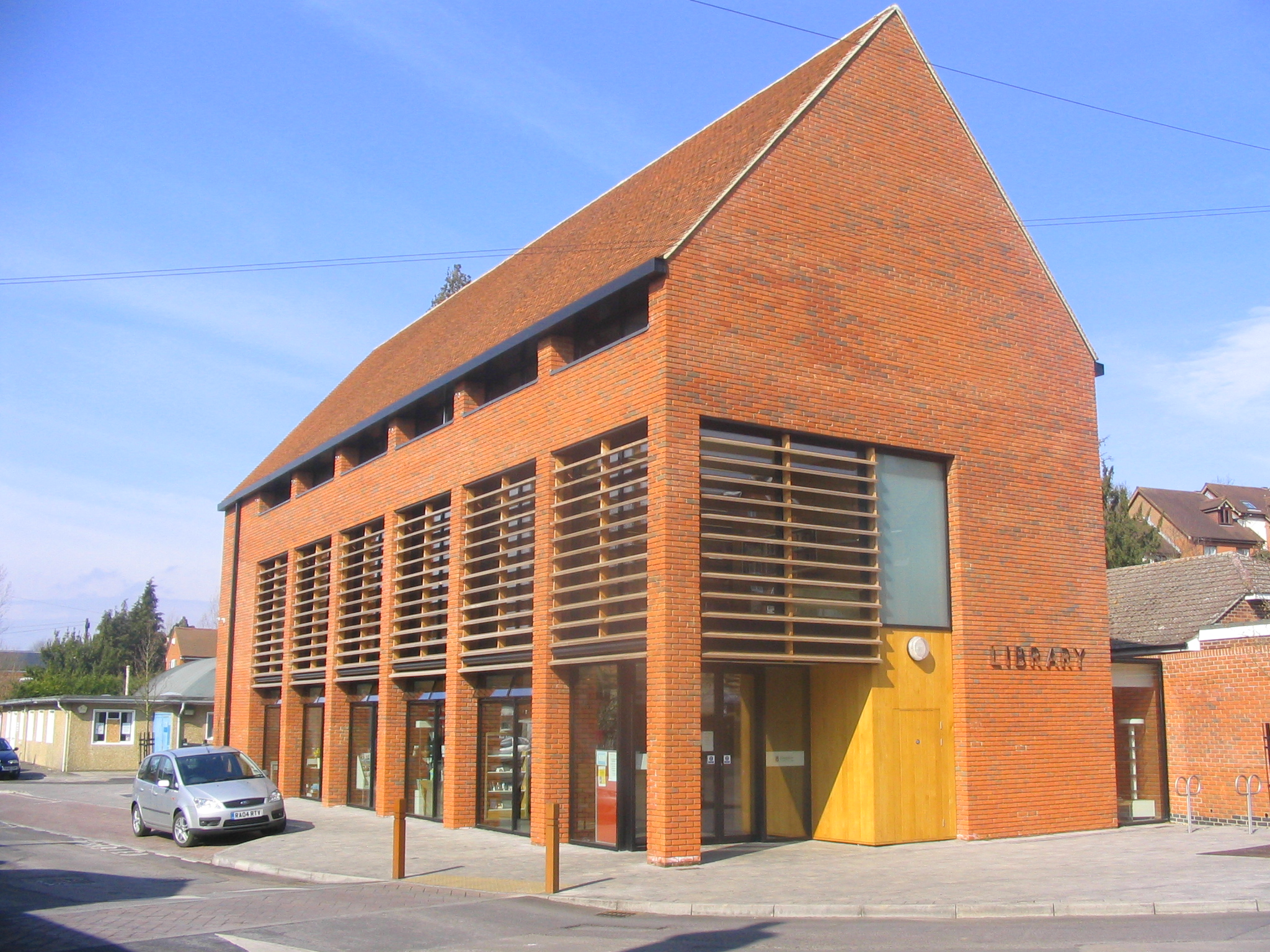
Alton Library, Alton, Hampshire by Hampshire County Architects (2005)

Hampshire County Architects is the old name for Hampshire County Council Architecture, the in-house architecture and design department of HCC Property Services in Hampshire, UK. Over the years the multi-disciplinary team has developed a particular reputation for good school design and is also notable as the only sizeable public-sector county architecture studio remaining, following many years in the UK of outsourcing to the private sector. In 1991 County Architect Colin Stansfield Smith won a RIBA Gold Medal award.

== Staff ==
The team built its reputation in the 1980s under the leadership of Colin Stansfield Smith who arrived in 1974 and was county architect until 1992. As a result of his work at Hampshire County Council, was awarded the Royal Institute of British Architects (RIBA) Gold Medal in 1991. and was knighted in 1993.

In 2005 the department employed 57 architects. In 2013 the department employs over 270 architects, landscape architects, building surveyors, engineers (structural, electrical and mechanical), estates surveyors and interior designers.

Types of project work includes; education and schools; early years and children's centres; older person's homes and extra care; heritage and community buildings;office rationalisation and flexible working and co-location of public services

== Key building projects ==
- Queens Inclosure Middle School, Waterlooville, Hampshire. RIBA Award National overall winner, 1990.
- Woodlea Primary School, Bordon, Hampshire. RIBA Award National overall winner, 1993.
- Pilgrims Pre-Preparatory School, Bedford. RIBA Award winner, 2001.
- Alton Library, Hampshire. Completed 2005. RIBA Award (South), 2005. Described by Jonathan Glancey as "a fine, enexpected design" and "like a handsome modern barn".
- Winchester Discovery Centre, Winchester, Hampshire. Completed 2007. Multiple accolades including RIBA Award 2008.
- Wellstead Primary School, Southampton, Hampshire. Completed 2008. Multiple accolades including CIAT Technical Excellence Award 2009 and RIBA Award 2010.
- Forest Park Special School, Southampton, Hampshire. Completed 2012. Multiple accolades including RIBA Downland Regional Award 2012, SCALA Civic Building of the Year 2012 - Runner up. Solent Design Award - Overall winner
- Endeavour Primary School, Andover, Hampshire. Completed 2012. RIBA Downland Award 2012.
- Havant Public Sector Plaza, Havant, Hampshire. Completed 2012. SCALA Civic Building of the Year 2012, Highly commended.
- Runways End, Aldershot, Hampshire. ICE South East England Engineering Excellence Awards 2012 - Community Award.
