= Bottle wall =

Wall made from bottles

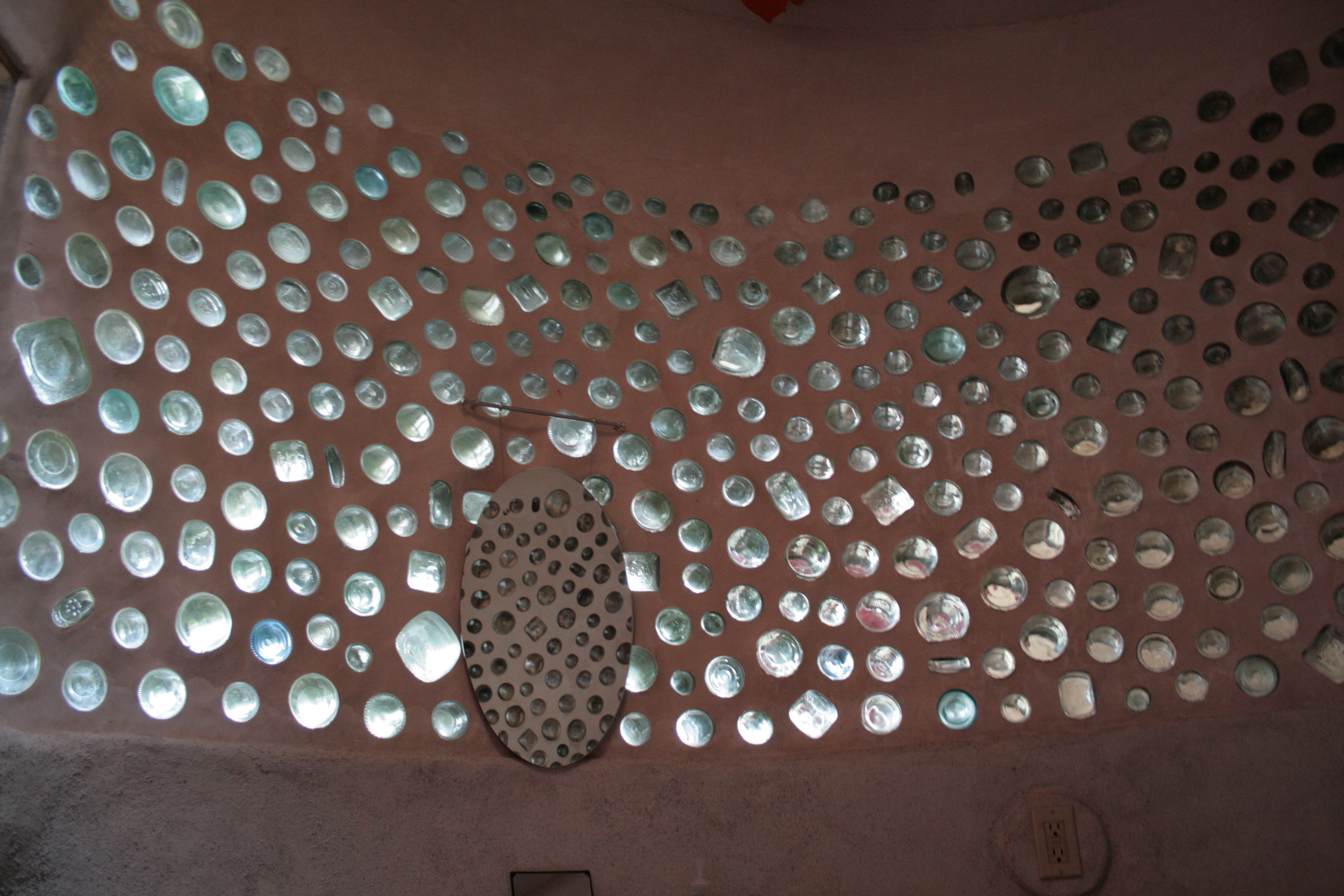
A bottle wall of an Earthship bathroom

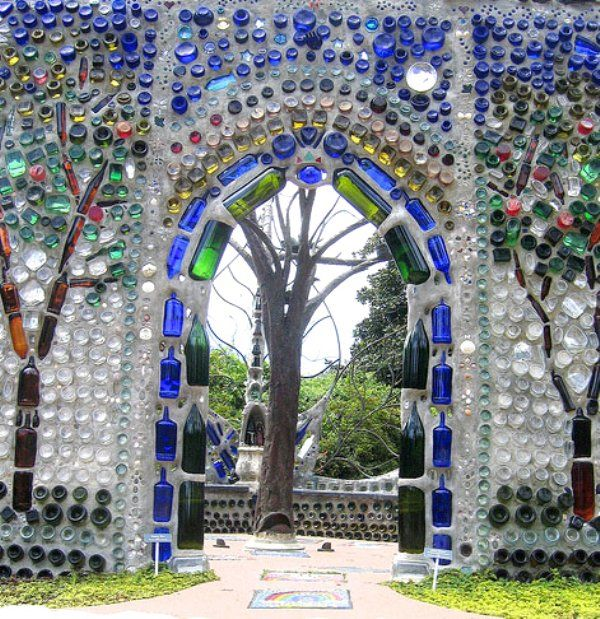
A colorful bottle wall

A bottle wall is a wall made out of glass or plastic bottles and binding material. It is a style of vernacular architecture which has been used in areas with limited building supplies, to divert glass from landfills, or for artistic reasons.

== Bottle wall construction ==
This is a building construction style which usually uses glass bottles (although mason jars, glass jugs, and other glass containers may be used also) as masonry units and binds them using adobe, sand, cement, stucco, clay, plaster, mortar or any other joint compound. This results in an intriguing stained-glass like wall. An alternative is to make the bottle wall from glass jugs filled with ink and set them up by supporting them between 2 windows.

== Construction ==
=== Construction materials ===
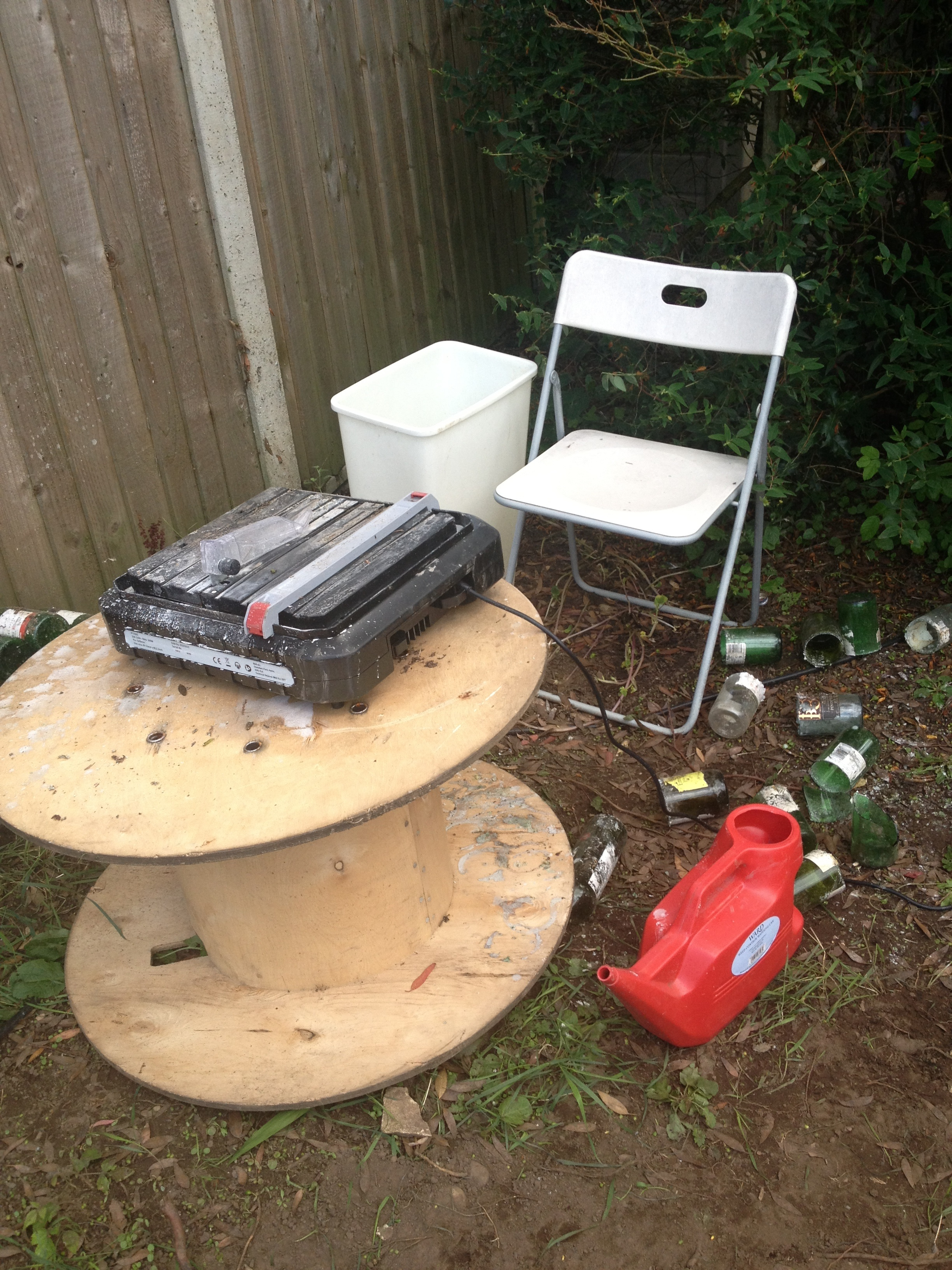
A ceramic tile cutter that has been used to cut bottles (seen on the ground behind the chair) to be taped together into a bottle wall

Although bottle walls can be constructed in many different ways, they are typically made on a foundation that is set into a trench in the earth to add stability to the wall. The trench is filled with a rubble of pea gravel and then filled in with cement. Rebar can be set into the foundation to add structural integrity. Bottle walls range one bottle to two bottles thick. Primitive mixture, such as cob or adobe can be used as mortar to bind the bottles. It is thickly spread on the previous layer of bottles followed by the next layer which is pressed into the mixture. Typically, two fingers of separation are used as a means of spacing although any kind of spacing can be achieved.

Bottles can also be duct taped together to create a window-type effect. Two similar size bottles can be taped together with the openings allowing a light passageway. This also traps air and creates a small amount of insulation. Filling glass with liquid that will be subjected to freezing and thawing is not a good idea, but is useful if the glass is protected from temperature extremes.

=== Heat sink ===
When the bottles are filled with a (dark) liquid, or other dark material, the wall can function as a thermal mass, absorbing solar radiation during the day and radiating it back into the space at night, thus dampening diurnal temperature swings. This may be a pleasant feature for colder climates - but can turn a room into an oven in hotter climates.

== Binding mixtures ==
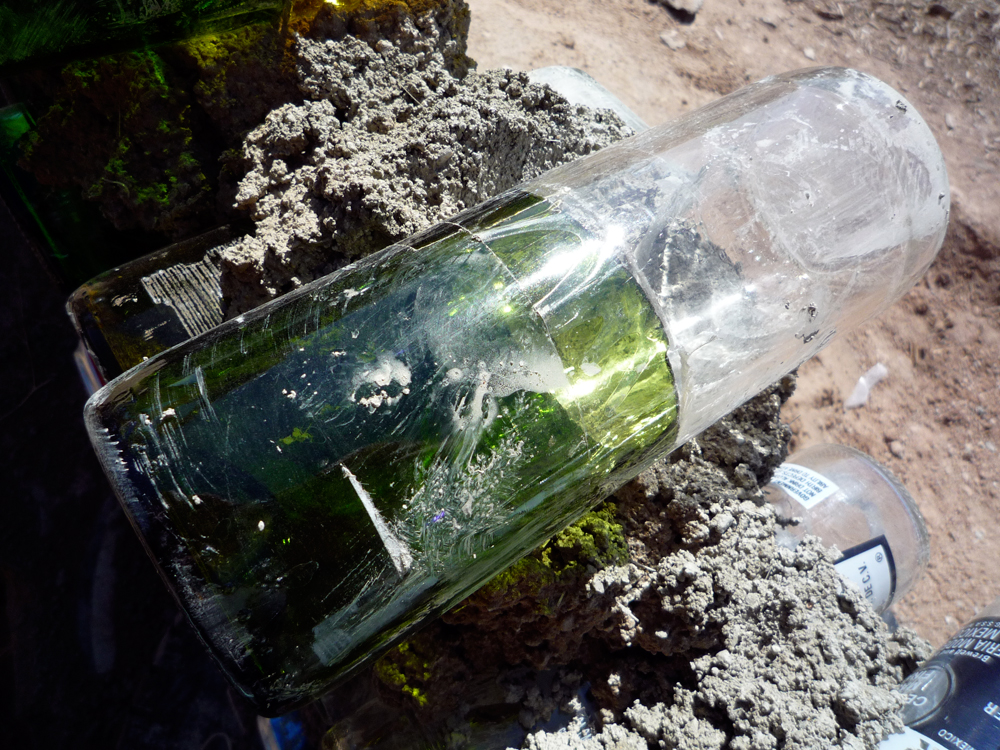
Two bottles cut and taped together, sitting in wet mortar

A typical mortar mix is 3:1 mason sand to a pozzolan (fly ash) cement mix. Other mixtures could be made from mortar and clay, adobe, cob, sand or cement. Bottle walls are extremely versatile and could be bonded with pretty much anything that can endure its given climate.

== Bottle houses throughout history ==
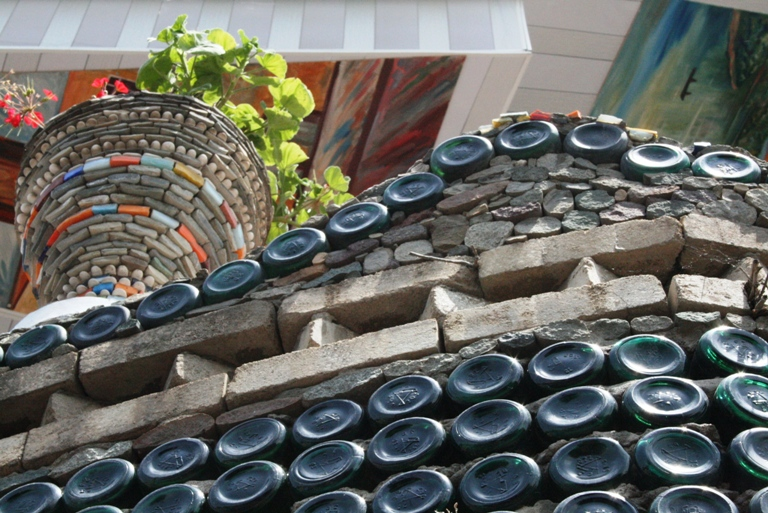
Detail of the Bottle house of Ganja in Azerbaijan

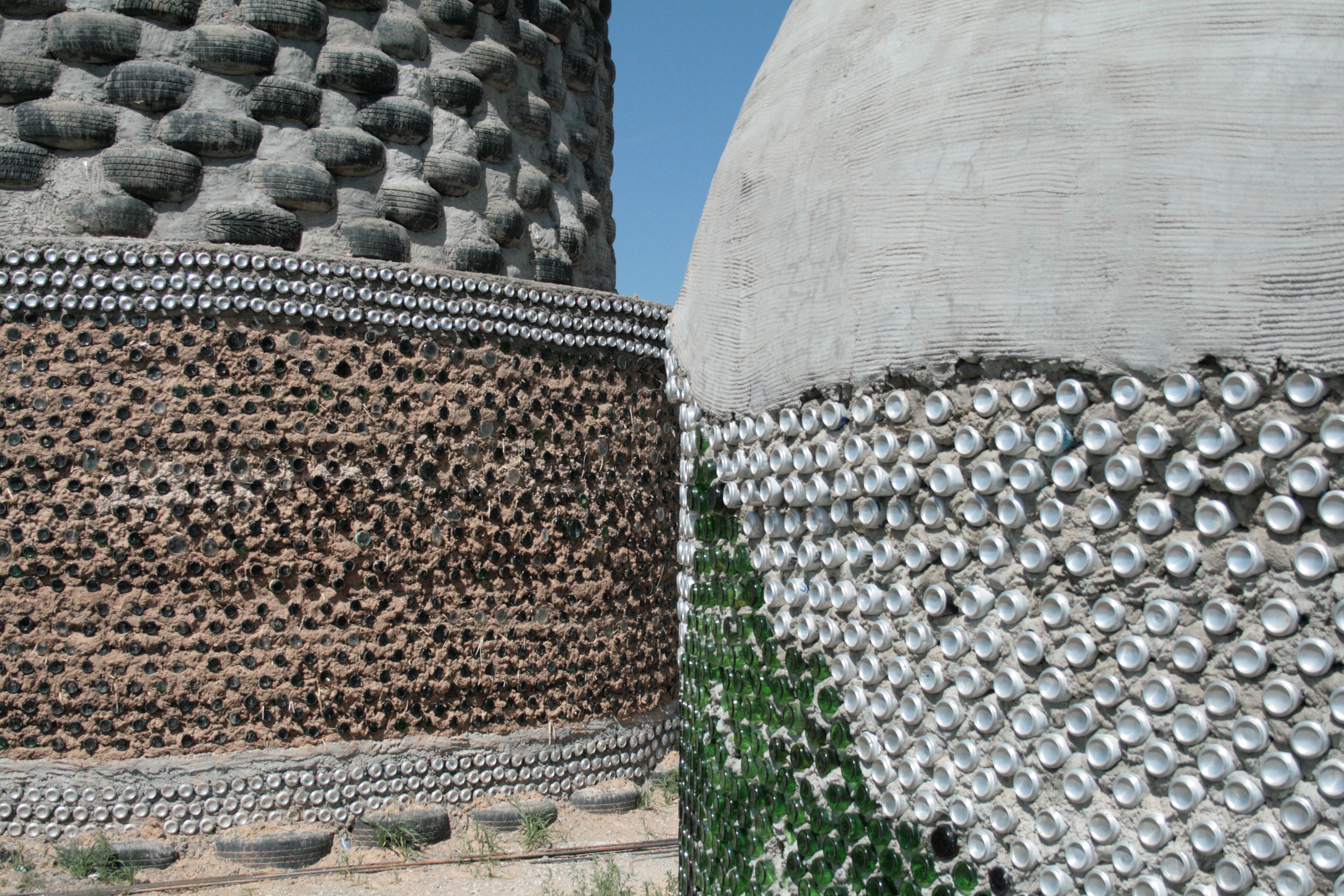
The exterior bottle walls of two earthships

The use of empty vessels in construction dates back at least to ancient Rome, where many structures used empty amphorae embedded in concrete. This was not done for aesthetic reasons, but to lighten the load of upper levels of structures, and also to reduce concrete usage. This technique was used for example in the Circus of Maxentius.

It is believed that the first modern bottle house was constructed in 1902 by William F. Peck in Tonopah, Nevada. The house was built using 10,000 bottles of J. Hostetter's Stomach Bitters which consisted of various herbs in a solution of 90% alcohol and 10% opium. The Peck house was demolished in the early 1980s.

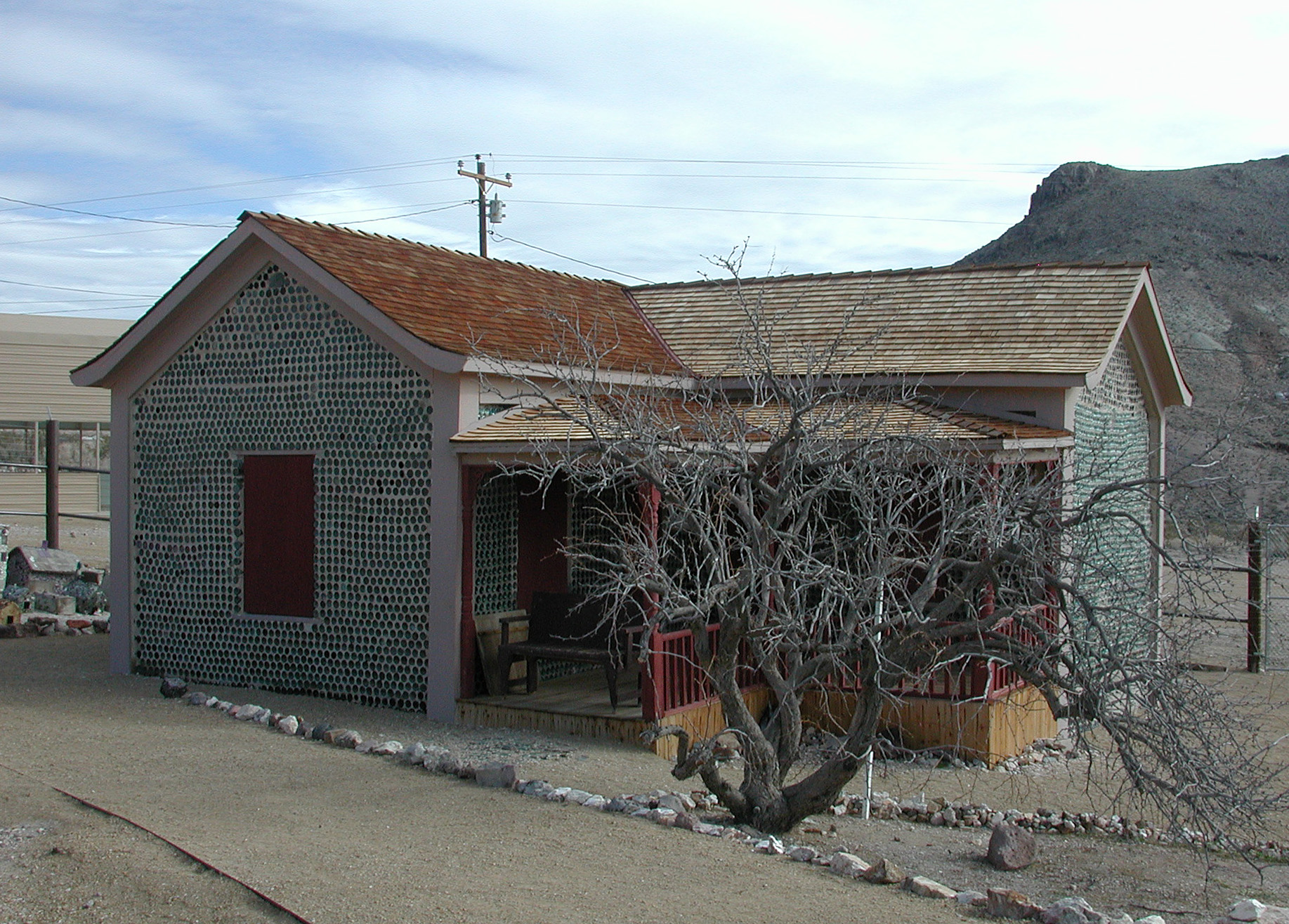
Rhyolite, Nevada bottle house

Around 1905, Tom Kelly built his house in Rhyolite, Nevada, using 51,000 beer bottles bonded with adobe. Kelly chose bottles because trees were scarce in the desert. Most of the bottles were Busch beer bottles collected from the 50 bars in this Gold Rush town. Rhyolite became a ghost town by 1920. In 1925, Paramount Pictures discovered the Bottle House and had it restored for use in a movie. It then became a museum, but tourism was slow, causing it to close. From 1936 to 1954, Lewis Murphy took care of the house and hosted tourists. From 1954 to 1969, Tommy Thompson occupied the house. He tried to make repairs to the house with concrete which, when mixed with the desert heat, caused many bottles to crack (Kelly had used adobe mud).

Knott's Berry Farm in Buena Park, California, has a bottle house, made from over 3,000 whiskey bottles, that it uses as an "Indian Trader" store today. The house is a remake of the Rhyolite Bottle House replicated from photos taken by Walter Knott in the early 1950s.

Another famous bottle house site was built by the self-taught senior citizen Tressa "Grandma" Prisbrey. Located in Simi Valley, California, Bottle Village is lauded by art scholars, The State of California, The National Register of Historic Places and in exhibitions, as a major artistic achievement. Beginning construction in 1956 at age 60, and working until 1981, Tressa "Grandma" Prisbrey transformed her 1/3 acre lot into Bottle Village, an otherworld of shrines, wishing wells, walkways, random constructions, plus 15 life size structures all made from found objects placed in mortar. The name "Bottle Village" comes from the structures themselves - made of tens of thousands of bottles unearthed via daily visits to the dump.

The Washington Court Bottle House in Ohio was made with 9,963 bottles of all sizes and colors. The builder was a bottle collector and, to display his collection, he had them built into this house which was on display at Meyer's Modern Tourist Court. In Alexandria, Louisiana, there is a bottle-house gift shop that still stands today. The bottle house was constructed by Drew Bridges who used bottles from his drugstore. There are about 3,000 bottles used as masonry units with railroad ties used as the framing structure.

The Kaleva Bottle House in Kaleva, Michigan, was built by John J. Makinen Sr. (1871–1942) using over 60,000 bottles laid on their sides with the bottoms toward the exterior. The bottles were mostly from his company, The Northwestern Bottling Works. The house was completed in 1941, but he died before he could move in. The building was purchased by the Kaleva Historical Museum in 1981 and is listed on the National Register of Historical Places. Boston Hills Pet Memorial Park in Boston, Massachusetts, has a bottle wall from 1942. It is part of a small building used for storage. The Wimberley Bottle House in Wimberley, Texas, was constructed using over 9,000 soda bottles. It was built in the early 1960s as part of a pioneer town, a simulated Old West town set to be a tourist attraction/theme park. The house was modeled after Knott's Berry Farm bottlehouse in California.

=== The Heineken WOBO (World Bottle) ===
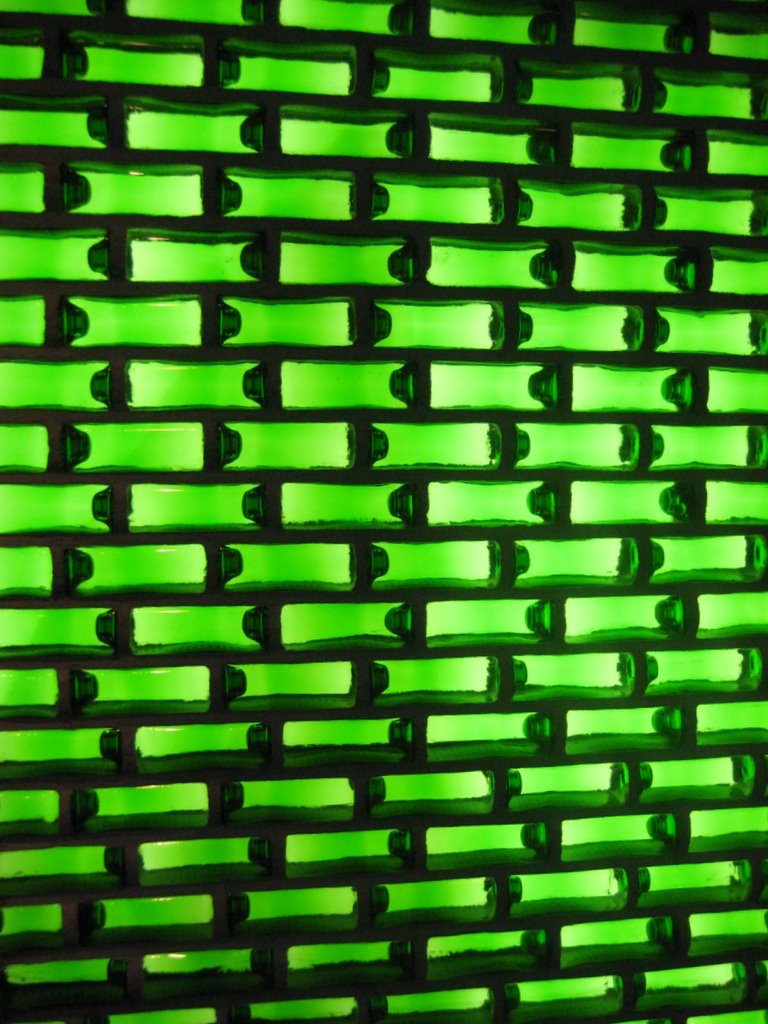
WOBO bottle wall, Amsterdam

While on a world tour of Heineken factories in 1960, Alfred Heineken had an epiphany on the Caribbean island of Curaçao, where he saw many bottles littering the beach because the island had no economic means of returning the bottles to the bottling plants from which they had come. He was also concerned with the lack of affordable building materials and the inadequate living conditions plaguing Curaçao's lower-class. Envisioning a solution for these problems, he asked Dutch architect N. John Habraken to design what he called "a brick that holds beer." A similar project was the Block-o-beer-bottle developed in 1959 by the east German Radeberger Brewery.

Over the next three years, the Heineken WOBO went through a design process. Some of the early designs were of interlocking and self-aligning bottles. The idea derived from a belief that the need for mortar would add complexity and expense to the bottle wall's intended simplicity and affordability. Some designs proved to be effective building materials, but too heavy and slow-forming to be economically produced. Other designs were rejected by Heineken based on aesthetic preferences. In the end, the bottle that was selected was a compromise between the previous designs.

The bottle was designed to be interlocking, laid horizontally and bonded with cement mortar with a silicon additive. The necks were short and fitted into a large recess in the base, the bottles were square section with dimpled sides to bond with the mortar. A 10 ft (3.0 m) x 10 ft (3.0 m) shack would take approximately 1,000 bottles to build. In 1963, 100,000 WOBOs were produced in two sizes, 350 and 500 mm. This size difference was necessary in order to bond the bottles when building a wall, in the same way as a half brick is necessary when building with bricks. Unfortunately, most of them are destroyed and as such, they are now very rare and have become a collector's item.

Only two WOBO structures exist and they are both on the Heineken estate in Noordwijk, near Amsterdam. The first was a small shed which had a corrugated iron roof and timber supports where the builder could not work out how to resolve the junction between necks and bases running in the same direction. Later, a timber double garage was renovated with WOBO siding. Alfred Heineken did not develop the WOBO concept further and the idea never got a chance to materialize. Rinus van den Berg, a Dutch industrial & architectural designer, designed several buildings while working with John Habraken in the 1970s. One design was published in Domus, 1976. A third WOBO structure was made by Dutch architect Gerard Baar in the late 1980s. He used a small batch of WOBO's for the side walls of his garden shed.

== Other notable bottle wall structures ==
- The Bottle house of Ganja in Azerbaijan was built between 1966 and 1967.

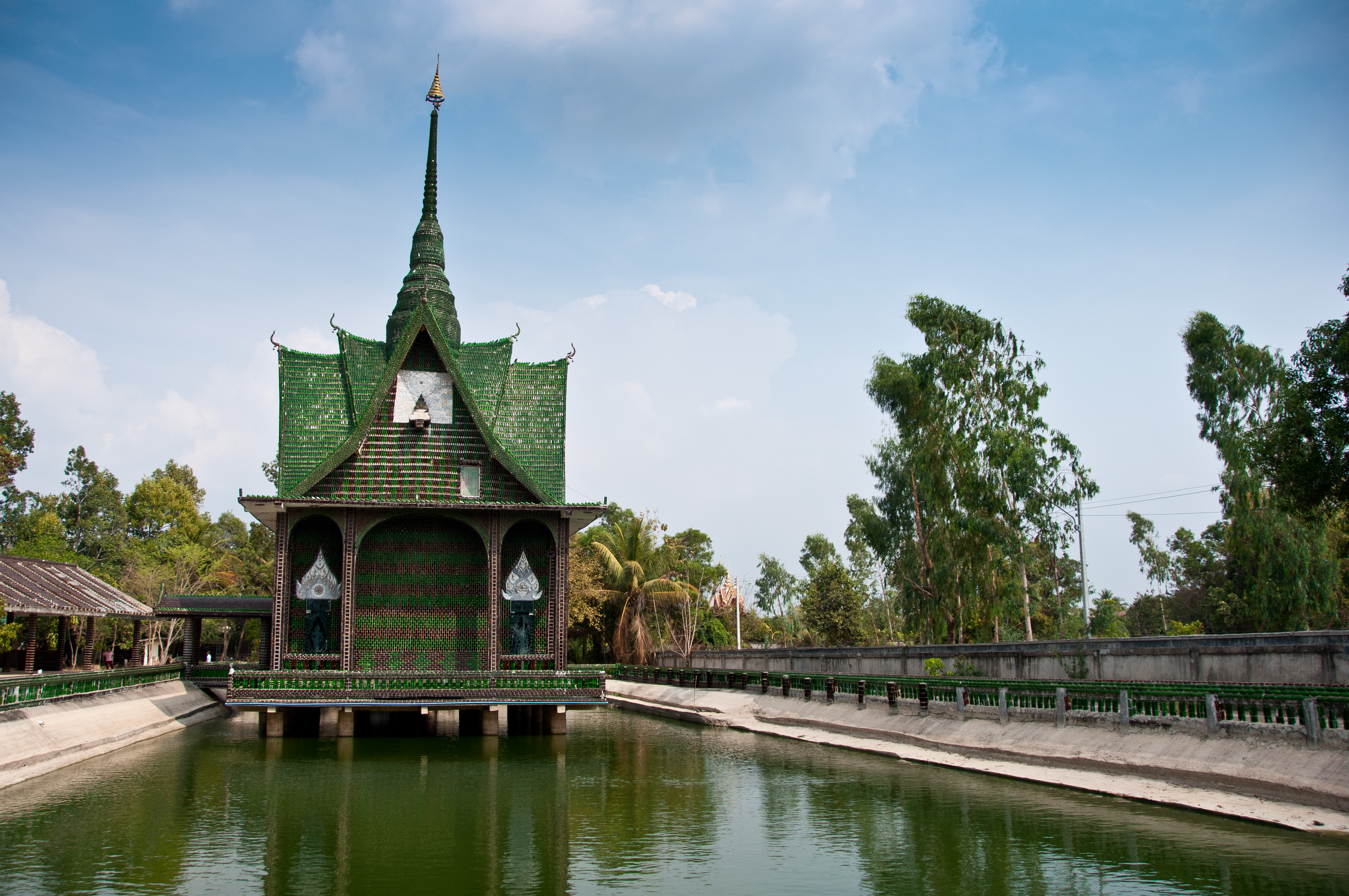
Wat Pa Maha Chedi Kaew, built by monks

- Wat Pa Maha Chedi Kaew is a temple in Thailand that was built by monks out of bottles.
- The Bottle Houses on Prince Edward Island in Canada consist of three bottle constructed structures, including a church.

== See also ==
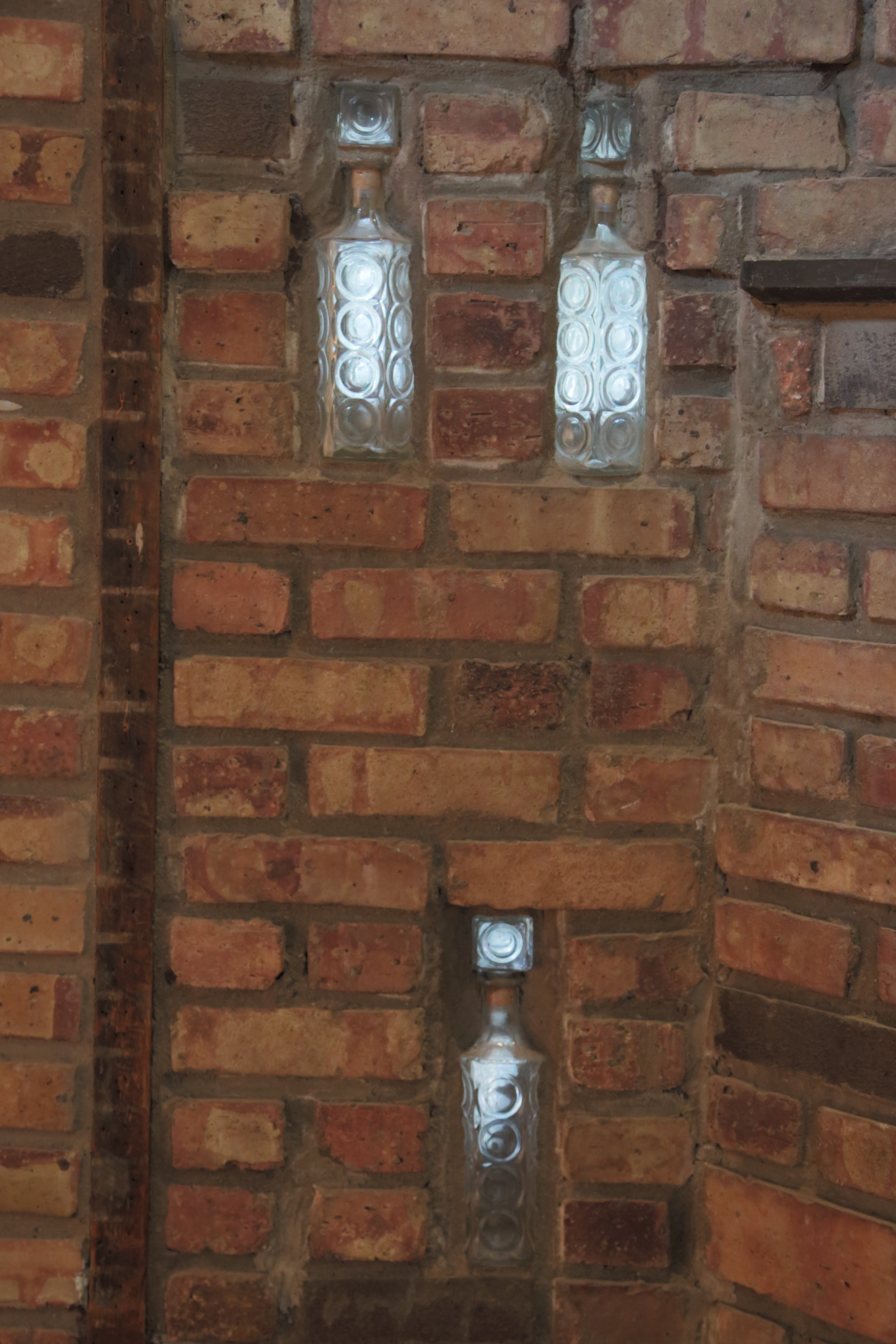
Bottles in a wall in Chicago

Media related to Bottles as building material at Wikimedia Commons

- Adobe
- Cob
- Glass brick
- Earthship
- Hundertwasser Toilets
- Tin can wall

== Books and publications ==
- Pawley, Martin. Building for Tomorrow: Putting Waste to Work. San Francisco: Sierra Club Books, 1982.
- Earthship Biotecture Earthship Biotecture. Mar 2007
- Warmke, Annie & Jay. "Building a Vaulted Strawbale Building." Blue Rock Station Publishing, 2006
- Warmke, Annie & Jay. "Building a Plastic Bottle Greenhouse." Blue Rock Station Publishing, 2008
