= The Bottle Houses =

Canadian roadside attraction

Les maisons de bouteilles - The Bottle Houses
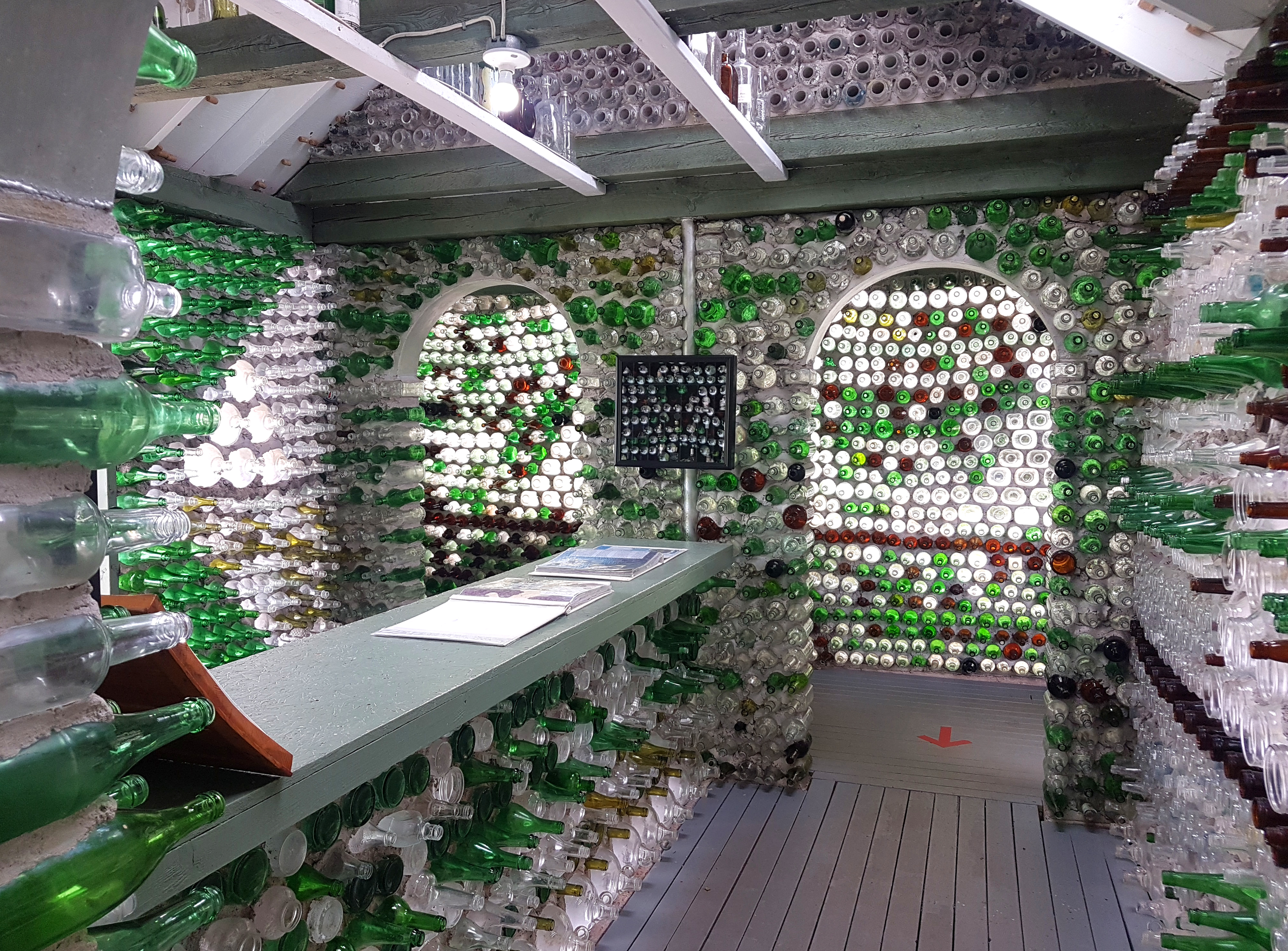
- Inside view of The Six Gabled House, the first of the three structures
- Artist: Édouard T. Arsenault
- Year: 1980-1983
- Type: Architectural glass
- Location: Cap-Egmont, Prince Edward Island, Canada; 46°24′08″N 64°06′06″W
- Owner: Angie Cormier
- Website: bottlehouses.com

The Bottle Houses are a series of three artistic structures made from recycled glass bottles, built on Prince Edward Island (PEI) from 1980 to 1983 by Edouard Arsenault. It is a popular tourist site in PEI. The work consists of The Six Gabled House (finished 1980), The Tavern (finished 1982), and The Chapel (finished 1983). Each structure is composed of bottle walls, with more traditional wood and shingle roofs.

== Edouard Arsenault ==
Edouard Arsenault, the architect of the bottle village, was born in 1914 to Emmanuel and Roseline Arsenault. He spent most of his time in Cap-Egmont before he moved to the United Kingdom to serve in World War II. He started off as a fisherman, a protégé under his father, then he began to fix up and construct boats. In 1948 he married Rosina Leclerc who later bore his first two children; they all lived in the Cap-Egmont lighthouse where he served as the resident lighthouse keeper till the lighthouse became automated, and they moved onto the grounds of the current bottle houses in PEI, where Edouard retired. In 1979, Arsenault's daughter sent him a postcard of a glass castle in British Columbia which she had visited, which inspired him to begin working on The Bottle Houses.

== Construction process ==
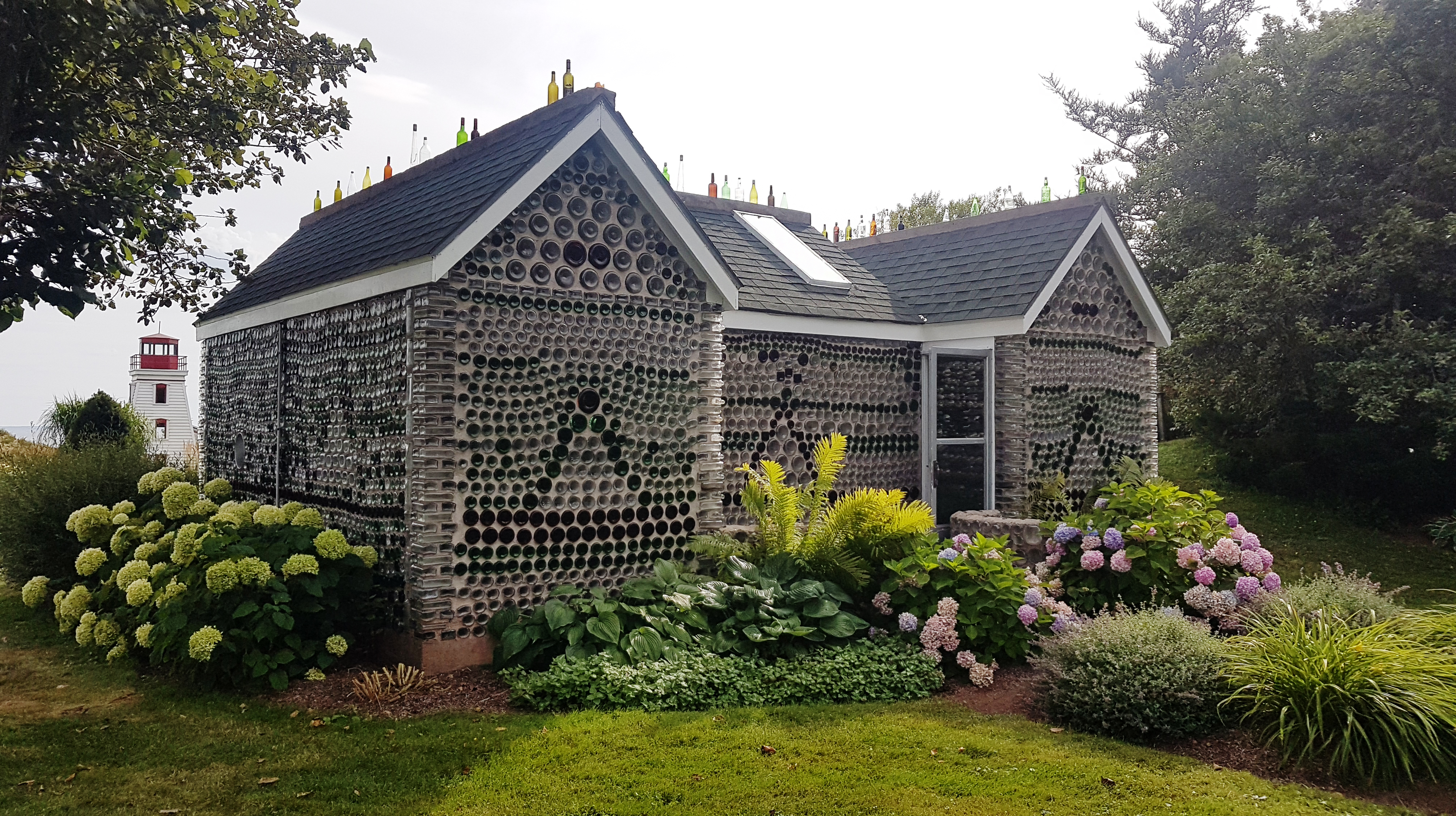
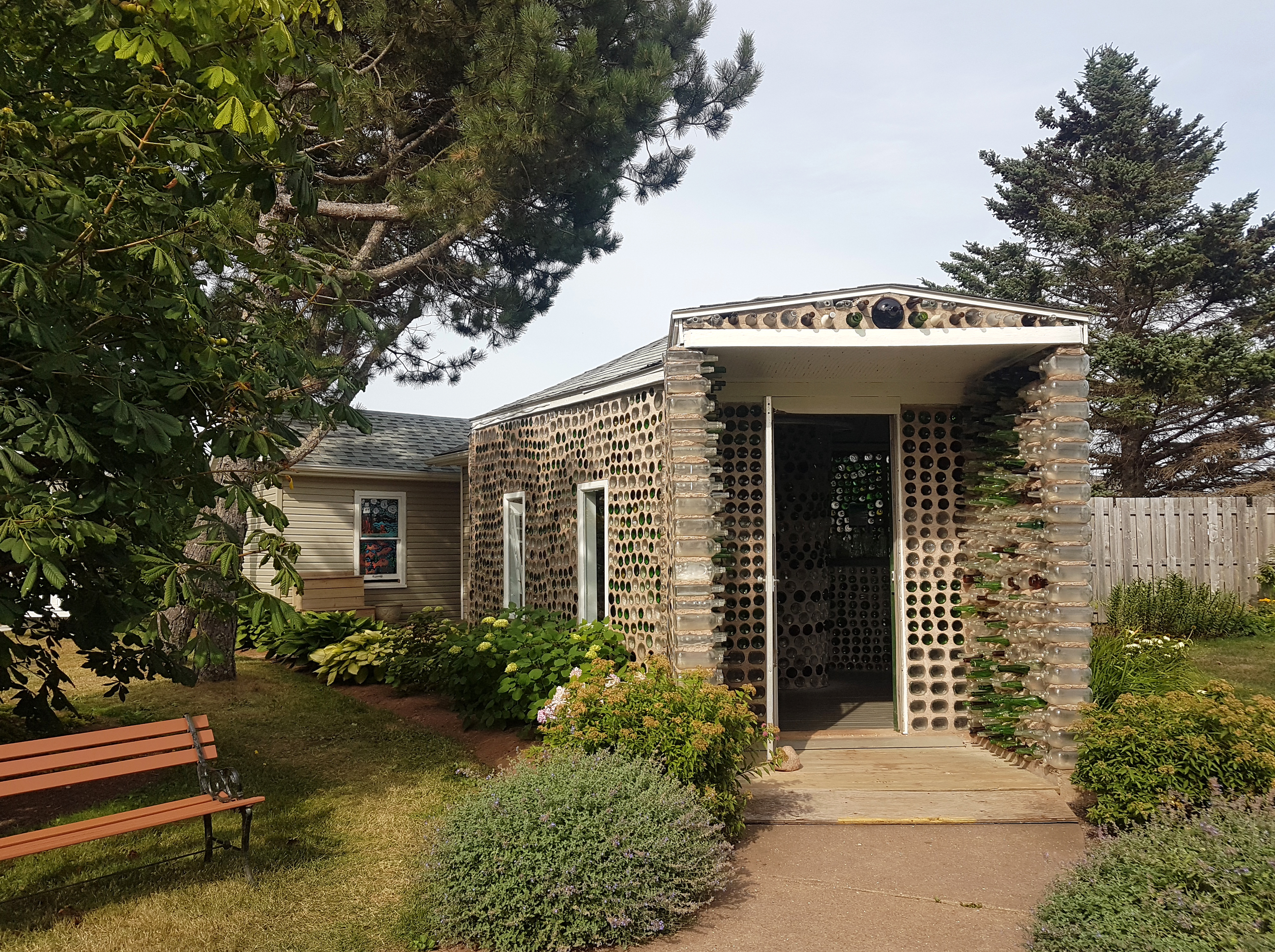
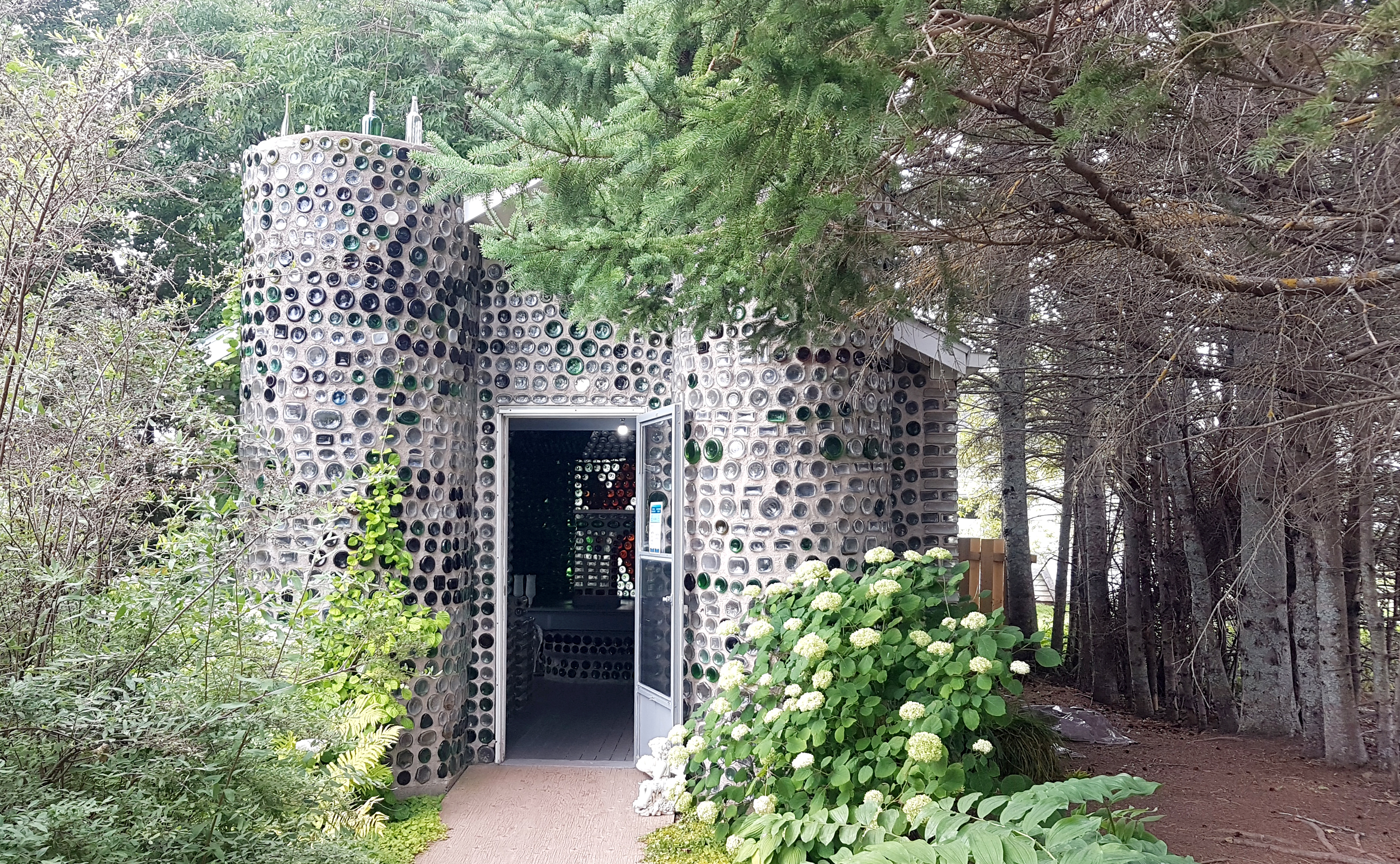
From top: The six gabled house (built in 1980), The Tavern (1982) and The Chapel (1983)

Arsenault began to collect over 25,000 recycled bottles. The bottles were sourced from various trash sites around the town and from bottles donated by the community. After he retrieved them, he spent the winter in the basement cleaning the bottles, removing the labels, and planning the project, which he began to build in 1980 at the age of 66. The Six Gabled House was built at 20 by 14 feet (6.1 m × 4.3 m) using about 12,000 bottles that formed the three main sections. Arsenault carefully picked the size and colors of the bottles to create unique patterns on the building's façade as well as in the rooms when light shines through them. He built it by cementing 300 to 400 bottles per row, using about 85 bags of cement to bind the bottles, over a six-month period before it was finally open to the public in 1981. He designed the hexagon shaped tavern in 1982, later rebuilt in 1993, which only used 8,000 bottles. The harsh winter conditions of PEI called for the rebuilding of the Tavern, though the initial roof and the central cylinder were able to be salvaged. Arsenault began work on The Chapel, but it was finished posthumously in 1983, made with 10,000 bottles. As light shines through the bottles, they create kaleidoscopic patterns and stained glass colors on the cement floor.

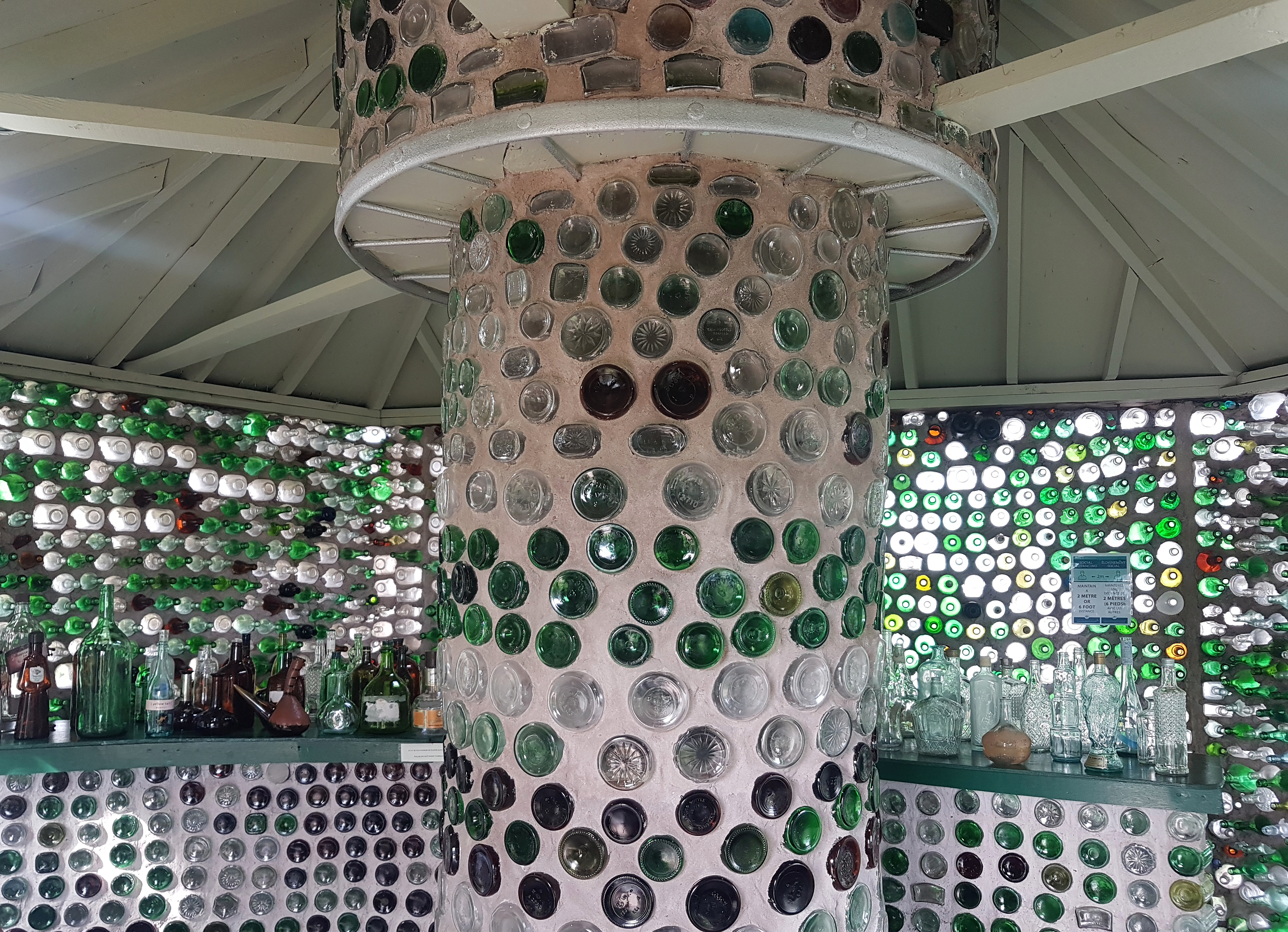
Inside The Tavern

== The garden and site ==
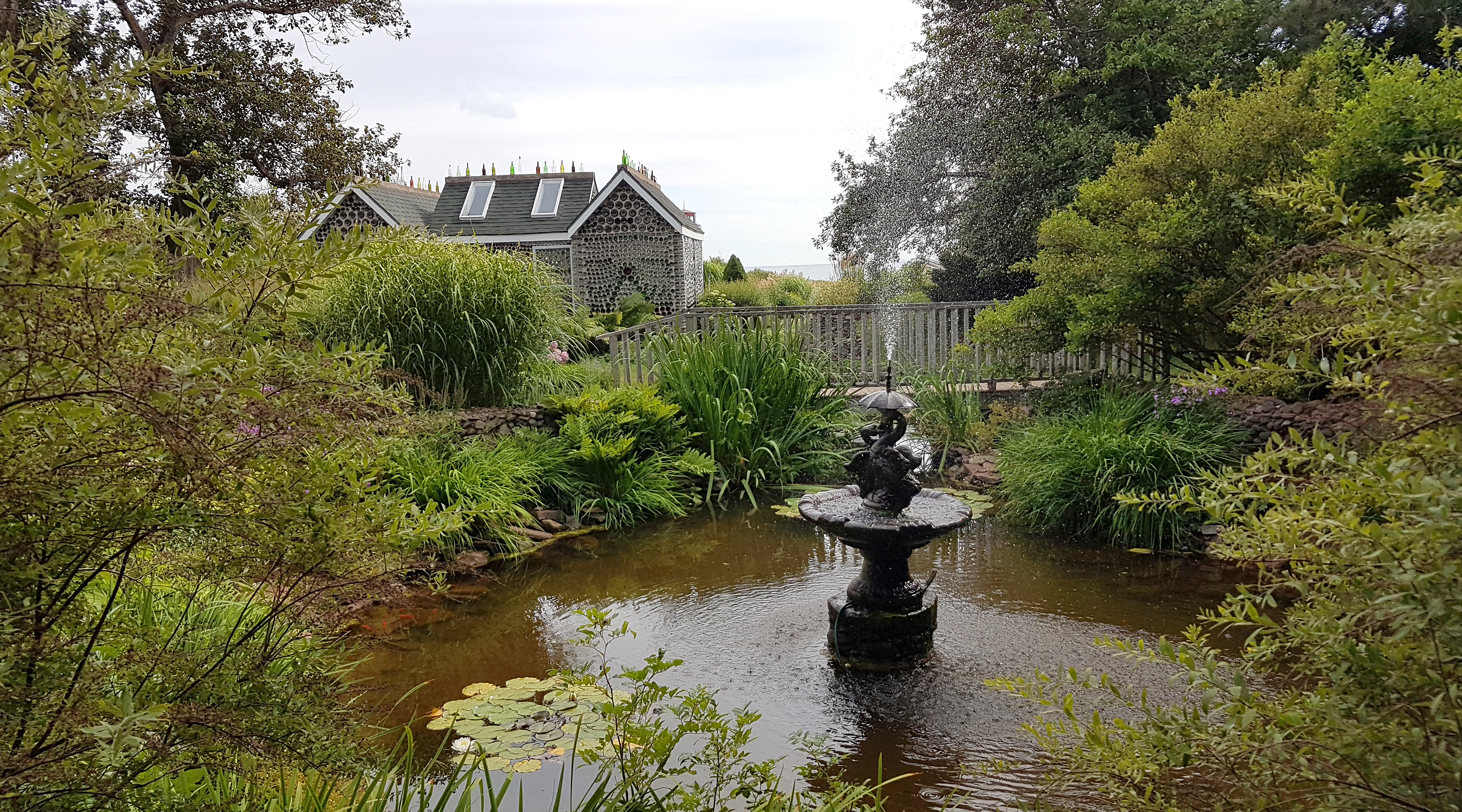
The site in the summer of 2020

The buildings sit around several Acadian gardens, trees, a pond, and bottle tree structures. Other features of site include wood carved structure of a woman's face, a gift shop, and a miniature replica of the lighthouse Arsenault tended to before his retirement. Apart from constructing the buildings Arsenault carried out the gardening and landscaping on the site. He spent his time after retiring planting trees on the site, laying out the stonework and designing the flower beds. His Acadian roots prompted his commitment to developing the Cap-Egmont, Evangeline area; he dedicated his retirement to designing artefacts that made his home community unique.

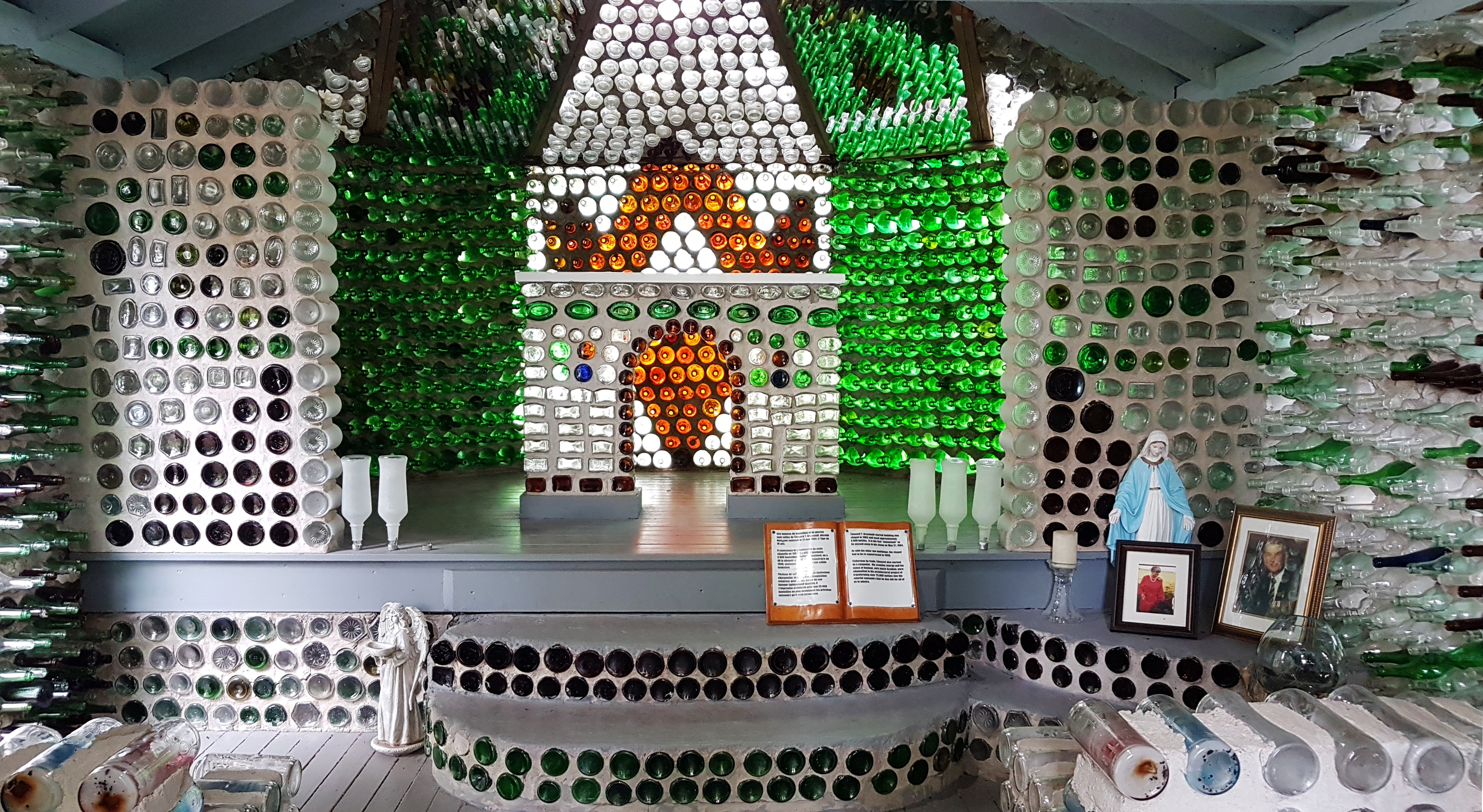
The altar inside The Chapel
