= Bottle house of Ganja =

Coordinates: 40.68176°N 46.35564°E

Bottle House of Ganja
- Butulka ev / Butulkalı ev

General information
- Status: Private property
- Location: Intersection of Huseyn Javid and Gambar Huseynli Streets, Ganja, Azerbaijan
- Construction started: 1966
- Completed: 1967

Technical details
- Floor count: 2

Design and construction
- Architect: Ibrahim Jafarov

Bottle House (Azerbaijani: Butulka ev/Butulkali ev) is an unusual private residence in Ganja built from glass bottles.

== Overview ==
Two-storey bottle house was built by Ibrahim Jafarov, a resident of Ganja in 1966-67 from glass bottles of different shapes and sizes, and colorful stones brought from Sochi. 48000 bottles were used in construction.

The construction of this house was dedicated to the memory of Ibrahim Jafarov's brother who went missing during World War II.

== Decoration ==
The construction year of the house was written on the wall of the front porch. A big portrait of missing brother Yusif Jafarov was drawn underneath the protrusion of the roof at the front. Additionally, the walls of the house were decorated with notes about Olympic Games held in USSR in the 1980s, and the name and portrait of the owner.

The words “Ganja” (the historic name of the city) were written on the different parts of the building with the bottoms of bottles, however during that time the city was officially called Kirovabad (1935–1989).

The house was reconstructed recently and is a popular destination for citizens and tourists.

== See also ==
- Ganja
- Architecture of Azerbaijan
