= Torlonia Collection =

Private art collection

The Torlonia Collection (Italian: Collezione Torlonia) is a private art collection of 620 Ancient Greek and Roman art works assembled by the noble Torlonia family of Rome, Italy. It has been called "the greatest private collection of ancient Roman antiquity" by archaeologist Darius Arya. Around 180 pieces are busts, one of the largest collections of Roman portraiture in the world.

== History ==
Referred to as a "collection of collections" by the archaeologist Salvatore Settis, much of the Torlonia Collection consists of older collections acquired either whole or in part by Prince Giovanni (1754–1829) and his son Prince Alessandro (1800–1886). Acquisitions of individual works and groups of classical art were also made on the art market, and the family conducted extensive excavations on its own properties in and around Rome to unearth further antiquities for the collection.

=== Acquisitions ===
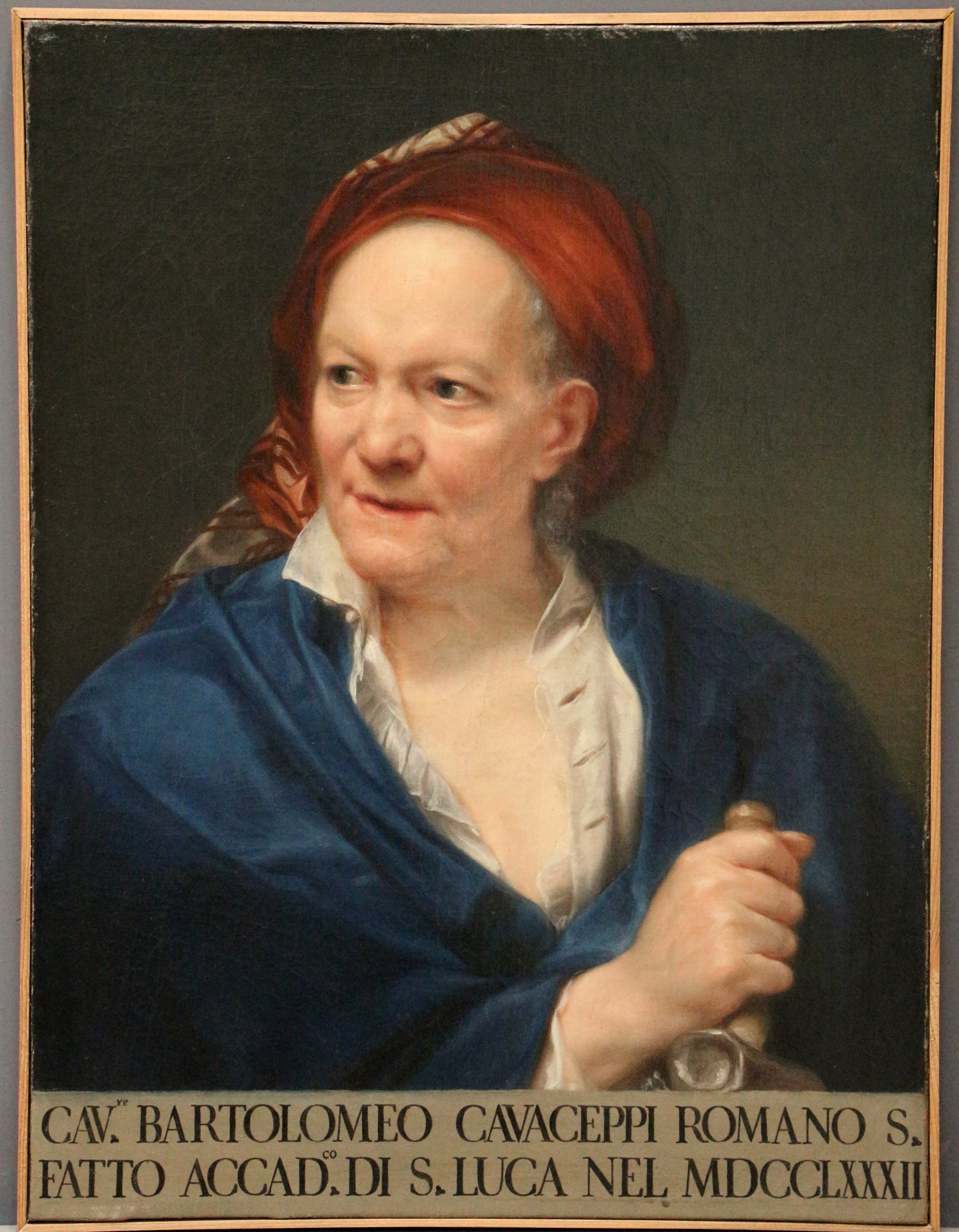
Bartolomeo Cavaceppi's collection of antique marbles was acquired by Giovanni Torlonia in 1800

In 1800, Prince Giovanni acquired the contents of the studio of the 18th-century sculptor-restorer Bartolomeo Cavaceppi, who had died the previous year. The ancient part of the collection consisted of a thousand pieces of sculpture, busts, reliefs, decorative and architectural fragments. There was also an array of modern sculptures executed by Cavaceppi, modern copies of antique sculpture, paintings, plaster casts, clay models and maquettes.

In 1816, 269 statues from the collection assembled by the 17th-century art collector and aristocrat Vincenzo Giustiniani (1564–1637), were transferred to Giovanni Torlonia as collateral on a loanof 33,600 scudi. After 1825, following Prince Vincenzo Giustiniani's failure to uphold the terms of his agreement, the Torlonias entered into a long legal dispute which concluded with the sculptures coming into Torlonia possession between 1856 and 1859. Some of the highlights which came from the Giustiniani Collection were a series of imperial busts and portraits, the Giustiniani Hestia, and the "Euthydemus of Bactria". Another is a statue of a resting goat whose body dates to the late 1st century AD and whose 17th-century head has been attributed to Gian Lorenzo Bernini, who worked for Vincenzo Giustiniani early in his career.

In 1866, the Villa Albani and its collections were also purchased. This collection had been assembled by Cardinal Alessandro Albani, under the curatorship of the classical art scholar and archaeologist Johann Joachim Winckelmann. One of the outstanding pieces belonging to the Villa Albani collection is the Torlonia Vase, a marble krater resting on carved lions' feet with a relief around its sides depicting a Bacchic symposium. It is believed to have adorned the Horti Agrippinae, the gardens of Agrippina the Elder between the Janiculum Hill and the Vatican plain. Before passing into the possession of Cardinal Albani and thence to Alessandro Torlonia, the vase belonged to the sixteenth-century Cesi Collection. The Albani collection also included a relief with Antinous taken from Hadrian's Villa, and a Roman bronze statuette of the Apollo Sauroctonos, after an original by the Greek sculptor Praxiteles, excavated on the Aventine Hill in 1778.

=== Excavations ===
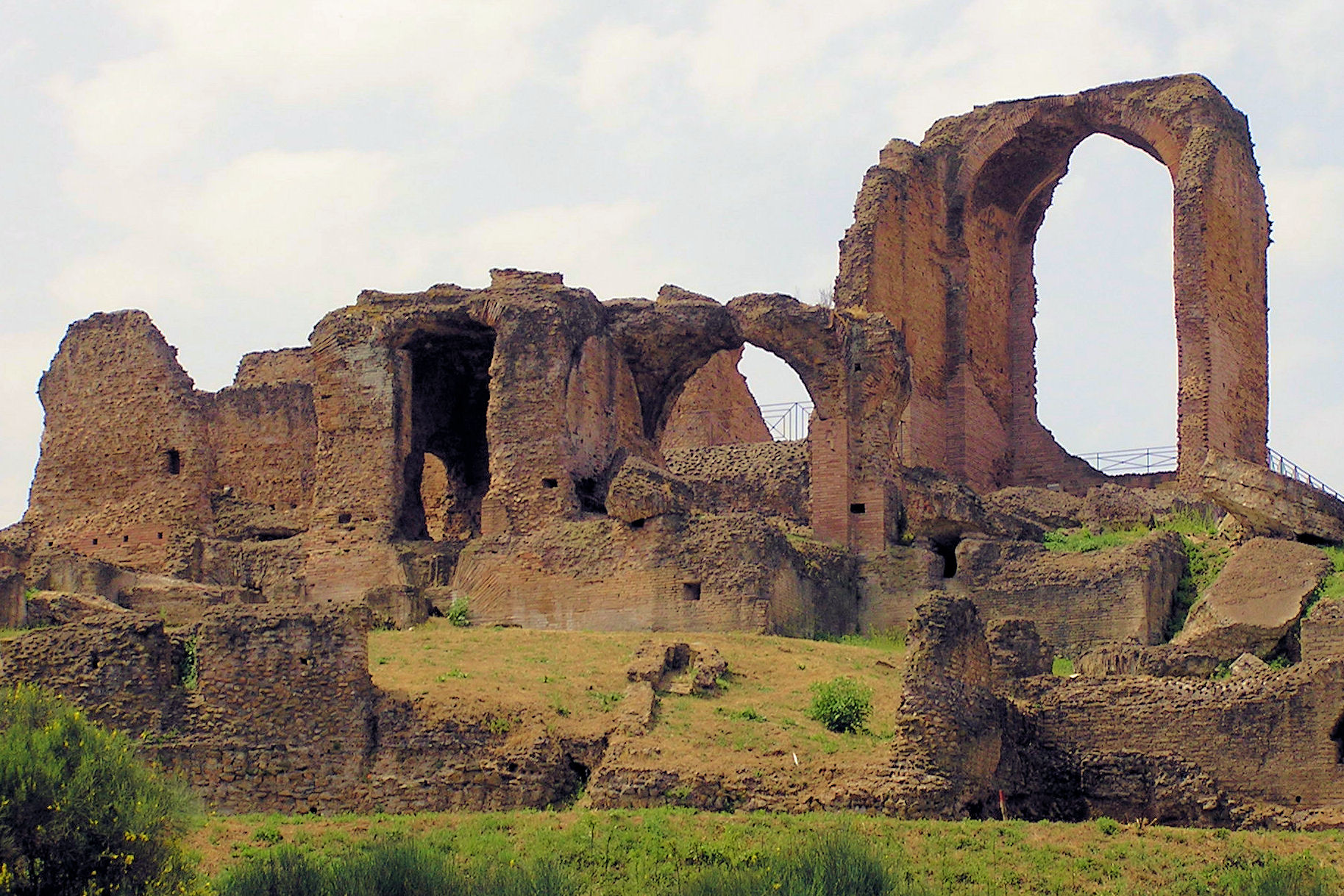
The Villa of the Quintili is one of many sites excavated by the Torlonias in the 19th century

The Torlonias excavated ancient ruins on their estate of Roma Vecchia, which housed sites like the Villa of the Quintilii and the Villa dei Sette Bassi, off of the Appian Way, and the Villa of Maxentius on the Via Latina. Some of the sculptures uncovered from these sites include an Attic relief from the slopes of the Acropolis in Athens, probably brought to Rome in the 2nd century AD by Herodes Atticus, a statuary group of Eirene and Ploutos made after an original by the sculptor Cephisodotus the Elder, and a group known as the "Invitation to the Dance" featuring a nymph and satyr.

Between 1827 and 1828 excavations were carried out around Anzio, and additional work was undertaken on the Torlonia estates of Caffarella, Quadraro, and at Portus, the site of imperial Rome's most important port. The finds from these estates were moved to the Palazzo Bolognetti-Torlonia, then brought to the Torlonia Museum after it was founded. Alessandro Torlonia acquired further property in Rome and its vicinity, including the Vigna dei Gesuiti on the Aventine Hill, which rested above the remains of the Baths of Decius. Other estates acquired for excavation were at Tuscia and Sabina; at Fara Sabina (ancient Cures), the collection's bronze statue of Germanicus was discovered.

=== Museum ===
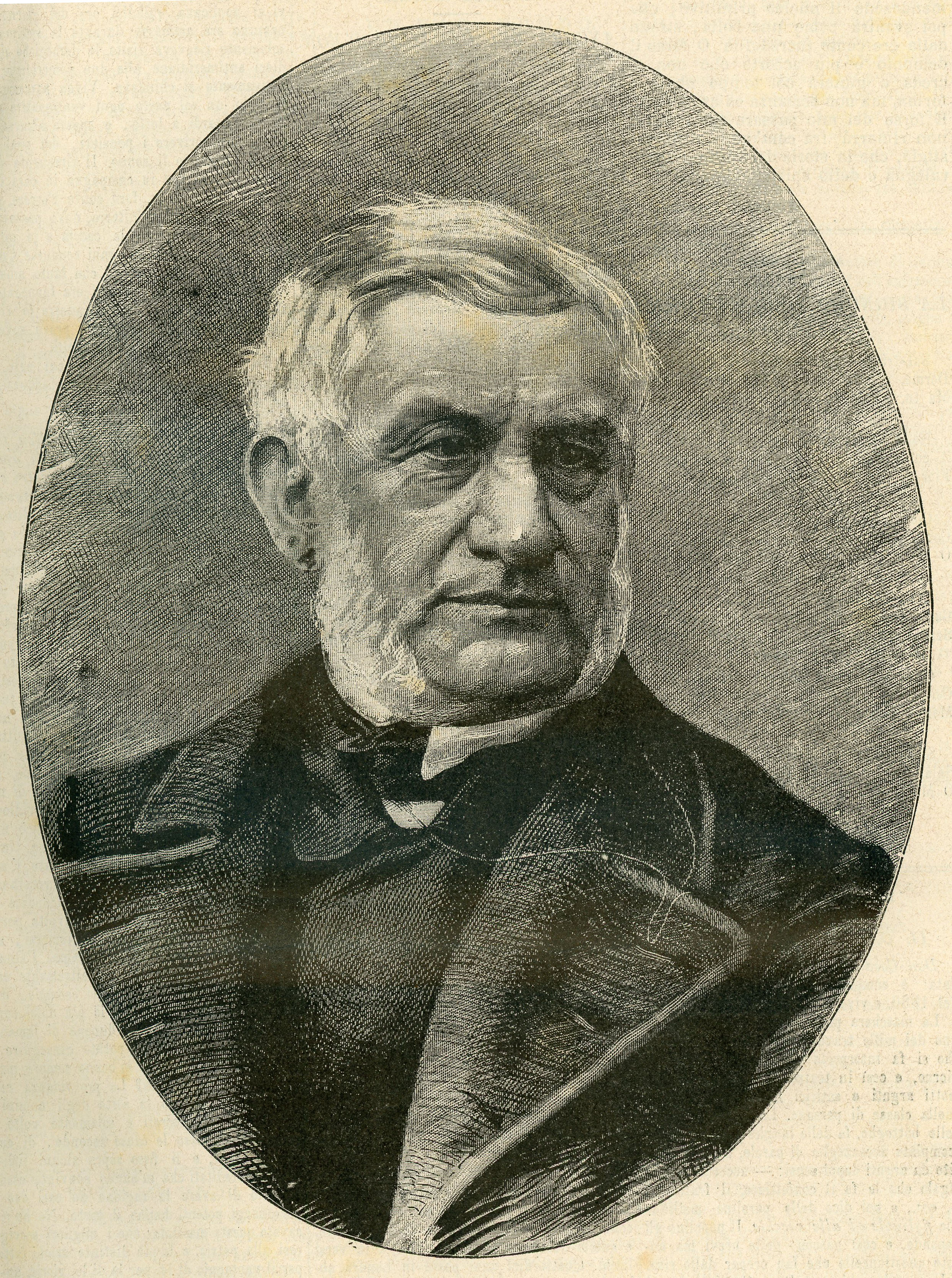
Prince Alessandro Torlonia opened a museum for the collection in 1875

In 1875, Prince Alessandro founded the Torlonia Museum on Via della Lungara in the Trastevere neighborhood of Rome. In that year the collection consisted of 517 works – new additions continued to be made until 1884, when the collection numbered 620 sculptures. The museum was only accessible to small groups of visitors and access by scholars was limited. A catalogue of the collection, authored by Pietro Ercole Visconti and featuring phototypes of all 620 works, was published in 1884. Prince Alessandro arranged for this catalogue to be donated to private individuals and to the libraries of archaeological institutes, to "bring it [the collection] in a splendid manner...to the notice of archaeologists, scholars, and all those who lack the opportunity to have it often before them."

== Exhibition ==
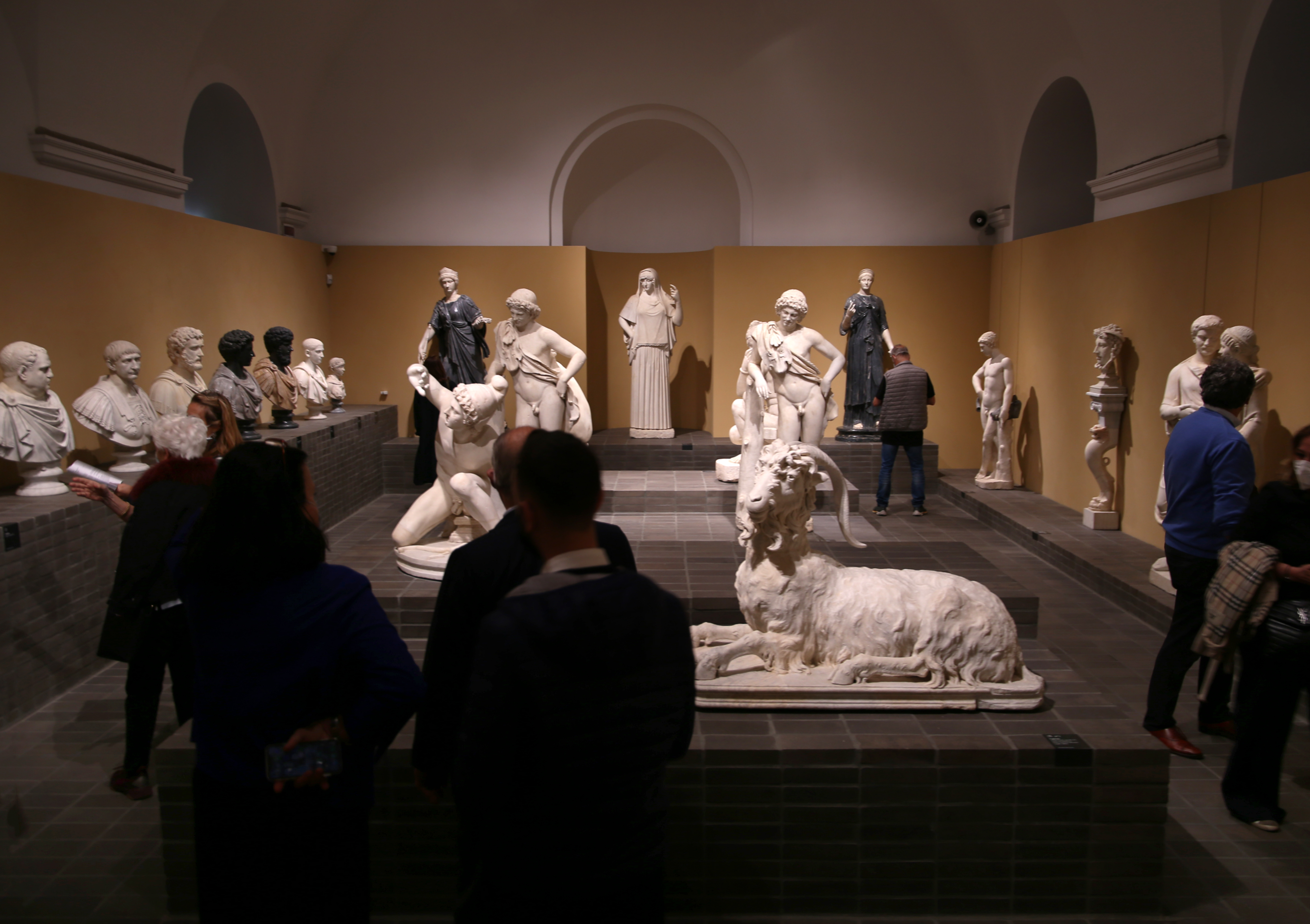
A room in Palazzo Caffarelli - Capitoline Museums dedicated to the marbles of the Torlonia Collection

In 2013, Prince Alessandro Torlonia (1925–2017) established the Torlonia Foundation to manage the collection. In 2016, the family, the foundation, and the Italian government signed an accord to display the collection. Restoration work sponsored by the Italian luxury house Bulgari, primarily to remove thick accumulations of dust, also began in 2016.

In October 2020, an exhibition of 92 works from the Torlonia Collection opened at the Capitoline Museums in Rome, the first public display of works from the Torlonia Collection in decades, and came after a series of failed negotiations between the Torlonia family and the Italian government over displaying or purchasing the collection dating back to the 1960s. After the exhibition was prolonged and finally came to an end in Rome, it was shown in Milano at the Gallerie d'Italia and the Louvre in Paris. In 2025, an exhibition of a varied selection of pieces organized by the Art Institute of Chicago will also go on to the Kimbell Art Museum in Fort Worth, Texas and the Montreal Museum of Fine Arts in Canada.
