= Torlonia Patrician =

Ancient Roman marble bust

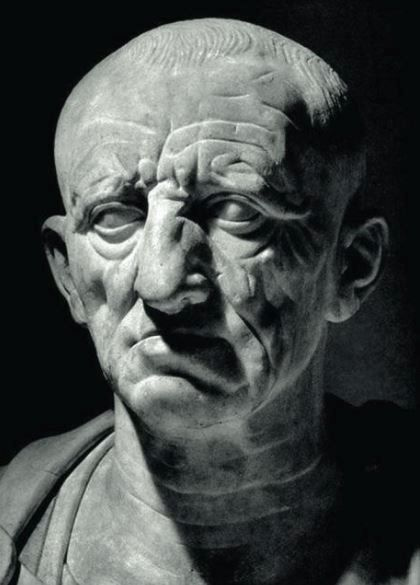
The Torlonia Patrician bust thought to be of Cato the Elder

Bust No. 535 of the Torlonia Collection, also called the Torlonia Patrician or the Old Man of Otricoli, is a marble bust, sometimes said to portray Marcus Porcius Cato Censorius, though also noted as being of "an unknown Roman politician". It is a copy of a Tiberian era bust (1st century AD), itself thought to be a copy of an original dating from around 80–70 BC. The piece is executed in the late Republican portrait style later known as verism, which "emphasize[s] the physical signs of aging... as evidence of an individual's experience, character, and virtues".

== 1880s identification with Galba ==
The Patrician was added to the Torlonia Museum as part of a gallery of busts depicting famous Romans "from Marius to the heirs of Constantine". A catalog of 1884/5 says that the portrait was discovered at Otricoli and identifies its subject as Galba; there is no corroborating evidence for the findspot, and the identification is certainly incorrect, perhaps motivated by the need for a portrait of Galba to fill a gap in the collection. The body of the bust, including the front of the neck, is a modern assemblage, possibly incorporating ancient fragments, while the head is ancient, except for repairs to the right ear and the tip of the nose.

== Gallery ==
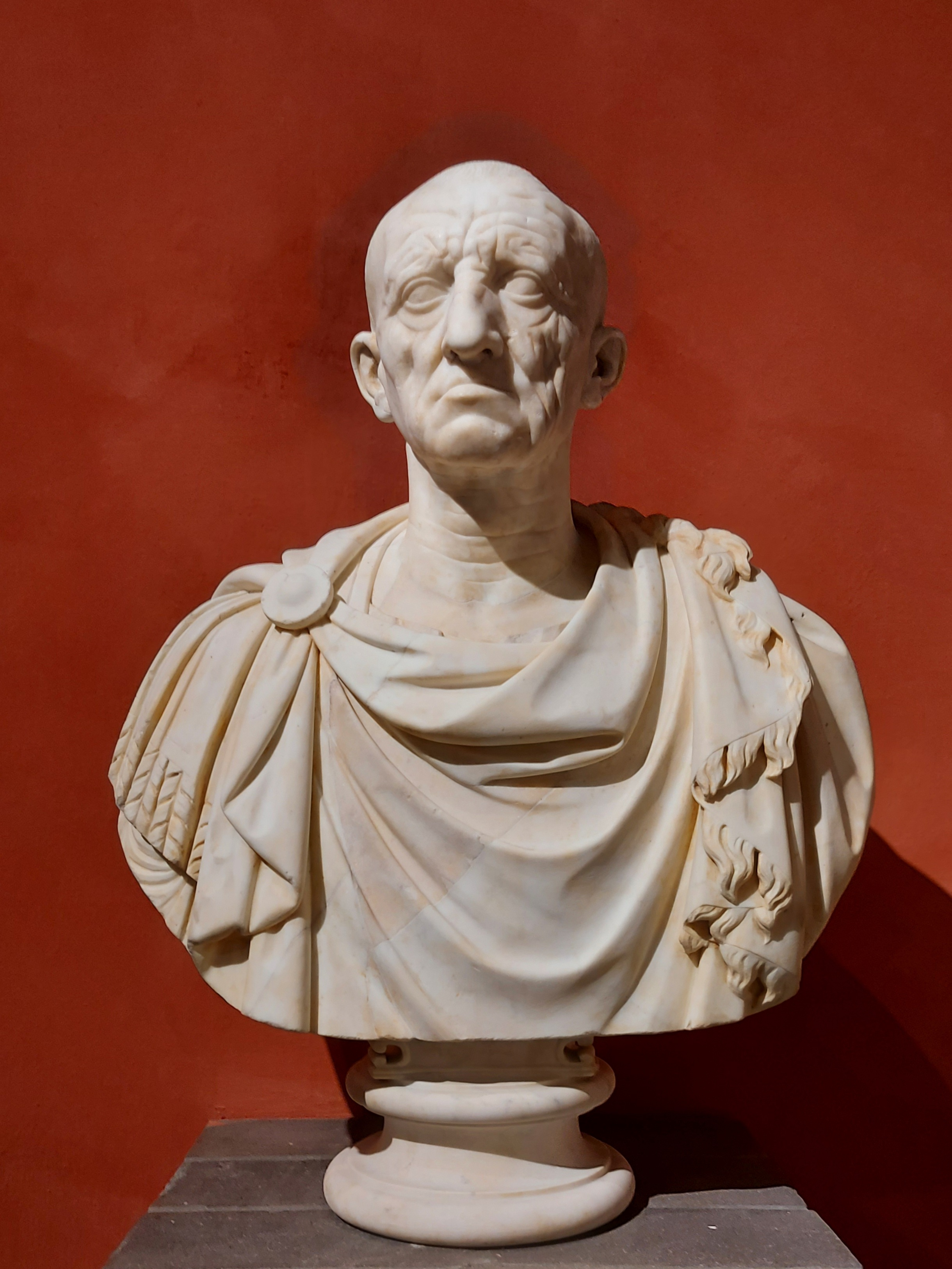

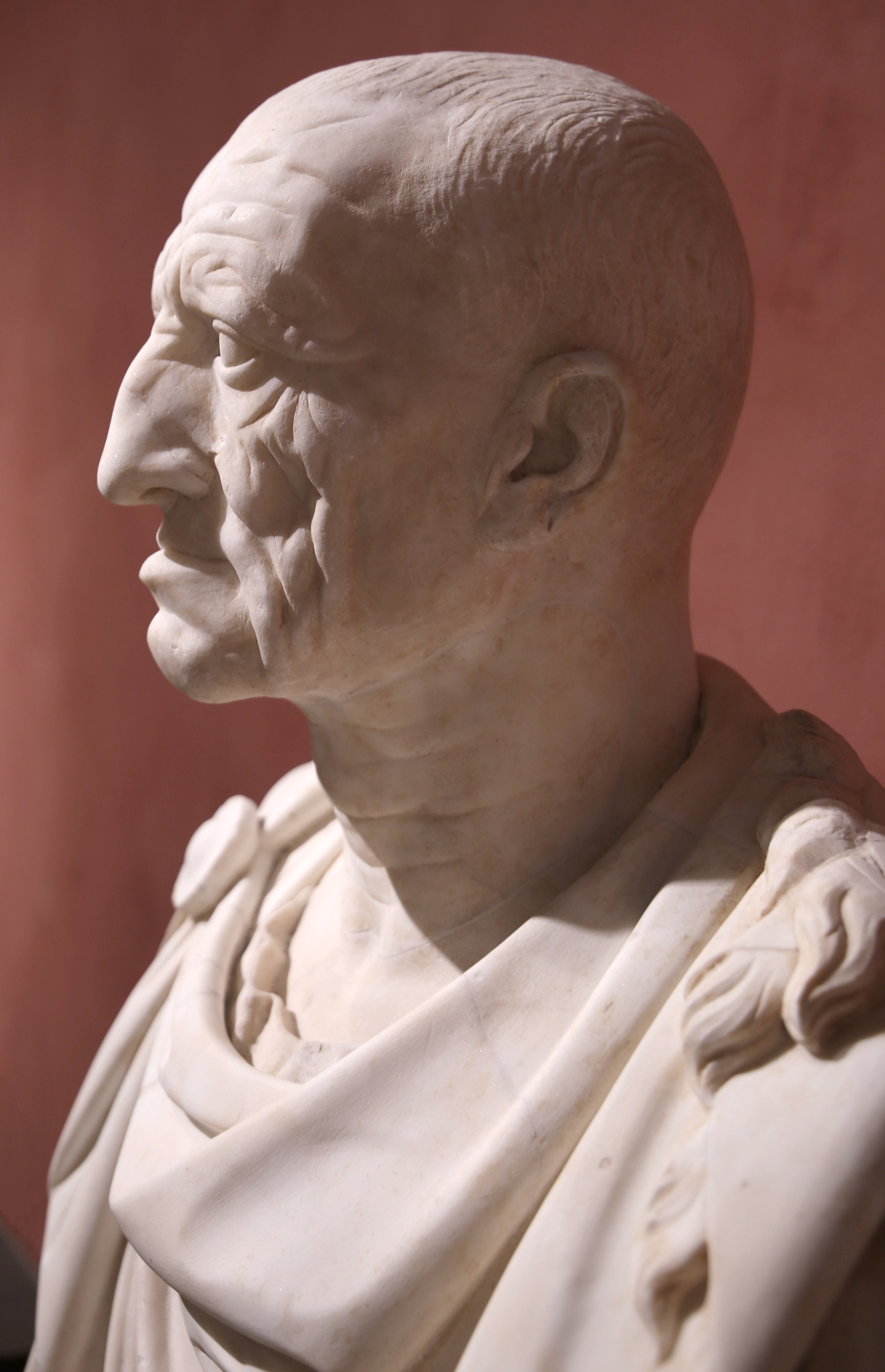

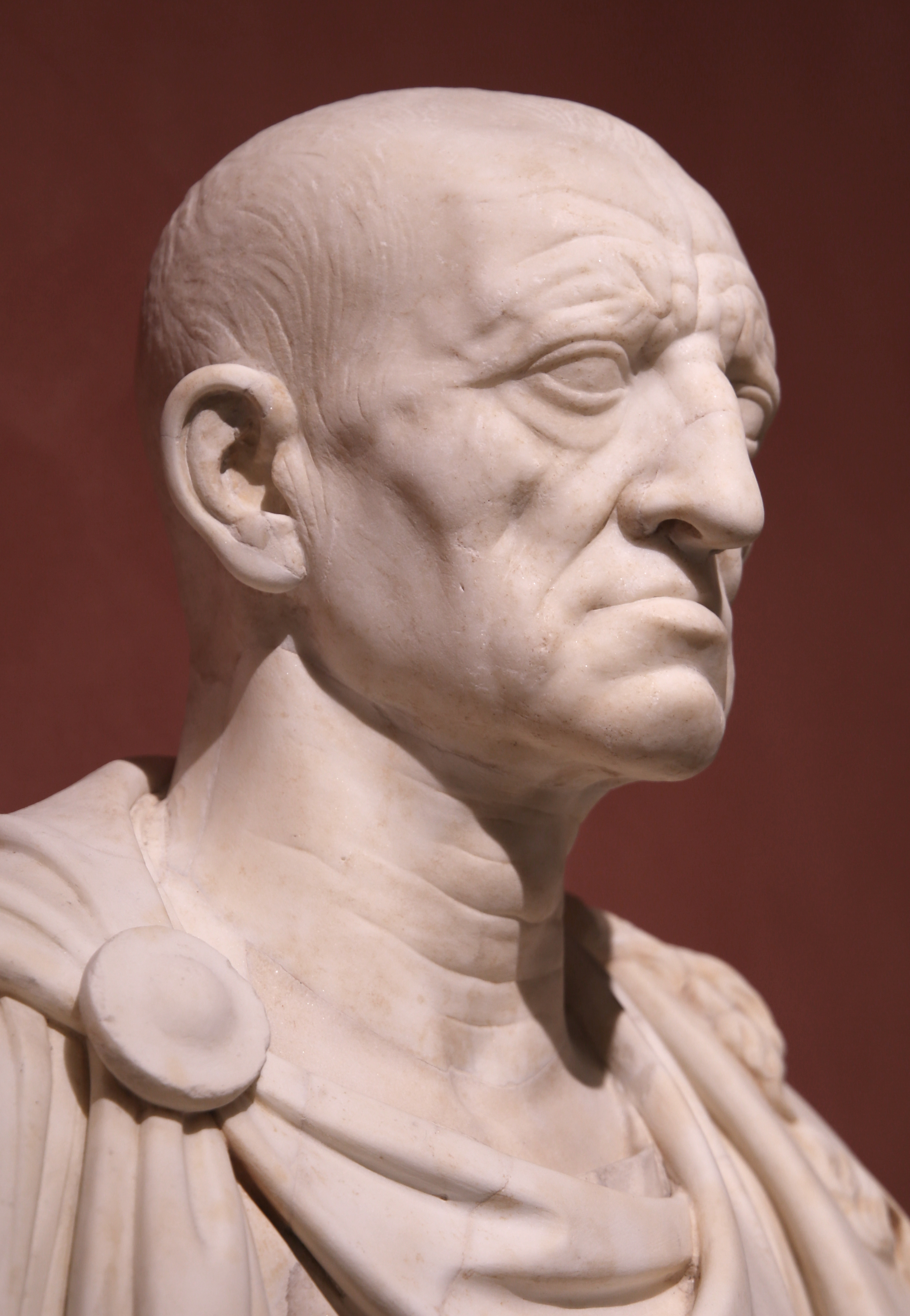

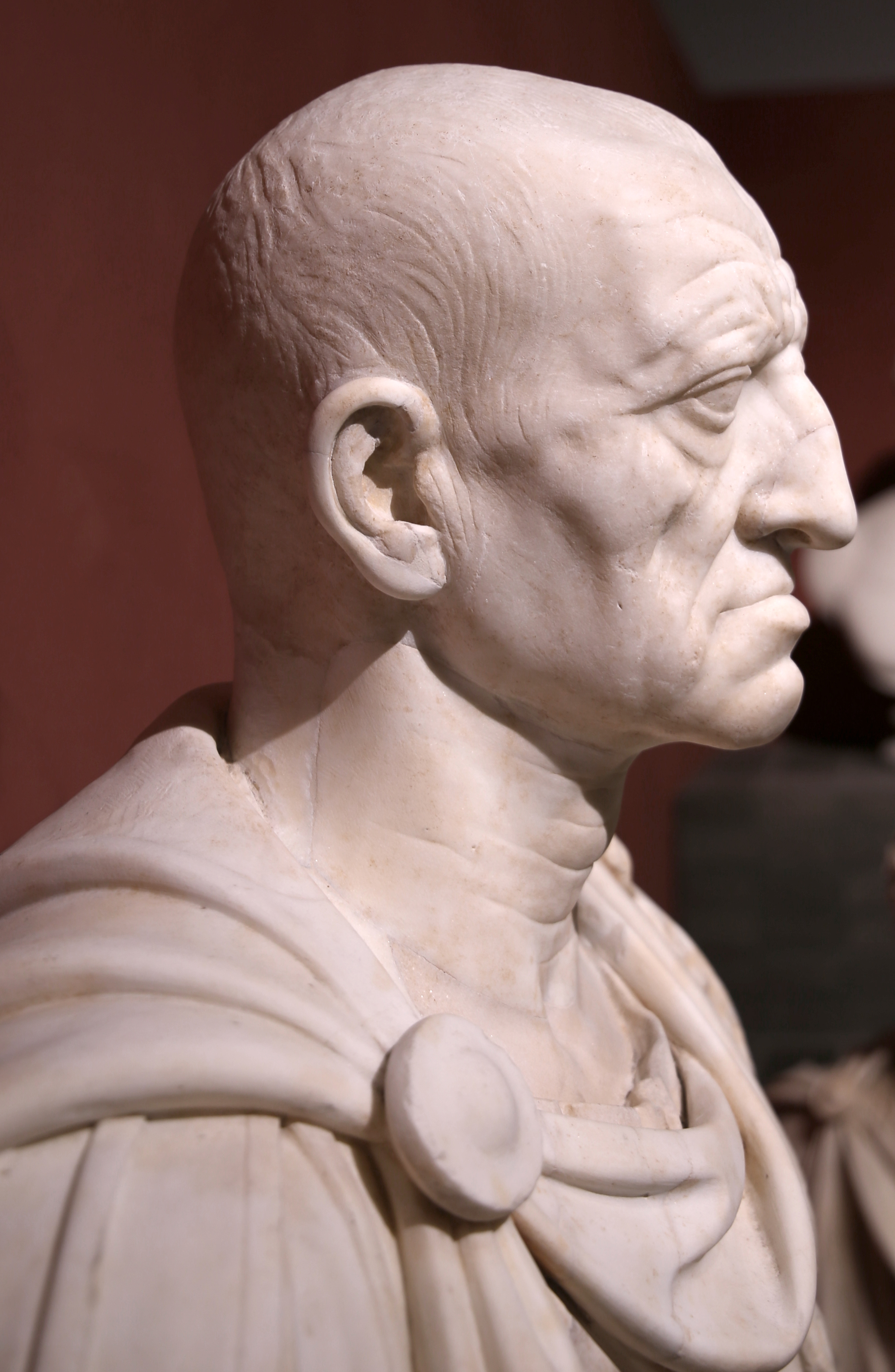

== Bibliography ==
- Çakmak, Lisa Ayla; Raff, Katharine A., eds. (2025). Myth & Marble: Ancient Roman Sculpture from the Torlonia Collection (1st ed.). New Haven and London: Yale University Press. ISBN 9780300279658.
- Settis, Salvatore; Gasparri, Carlo, eds. (2021). The Torlonia Marbles: Collecting Masterpieces (1st ed.). Verona and New York: Electa S.p.A. and Rizzoli International Publications, Inc. ISBN 9788892820876.
