= Alessandro Torlonia, 2nd Prince of Civitella-Cesi =

Italian prince (1800–1886)

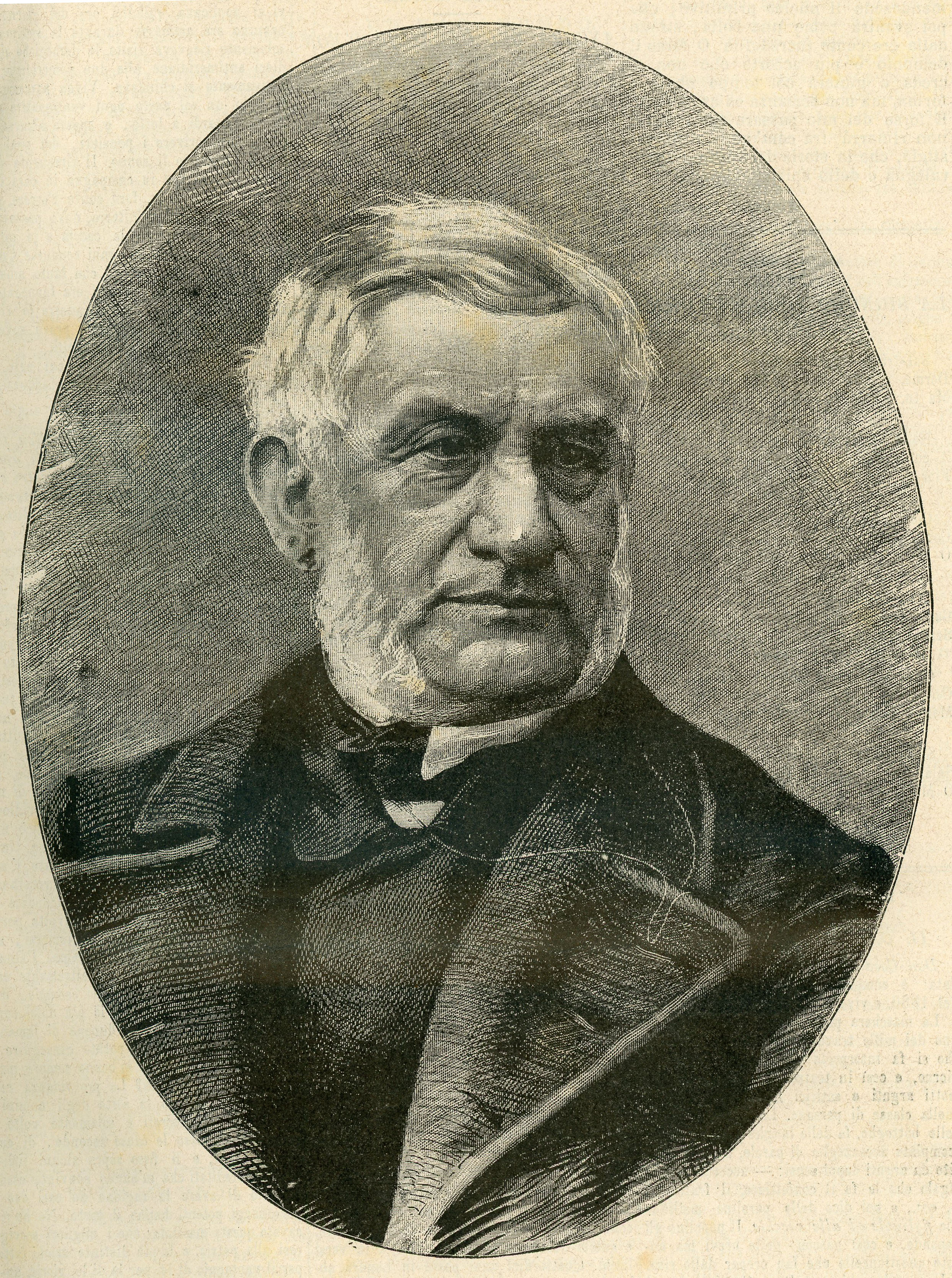
Alessandro Torlonia

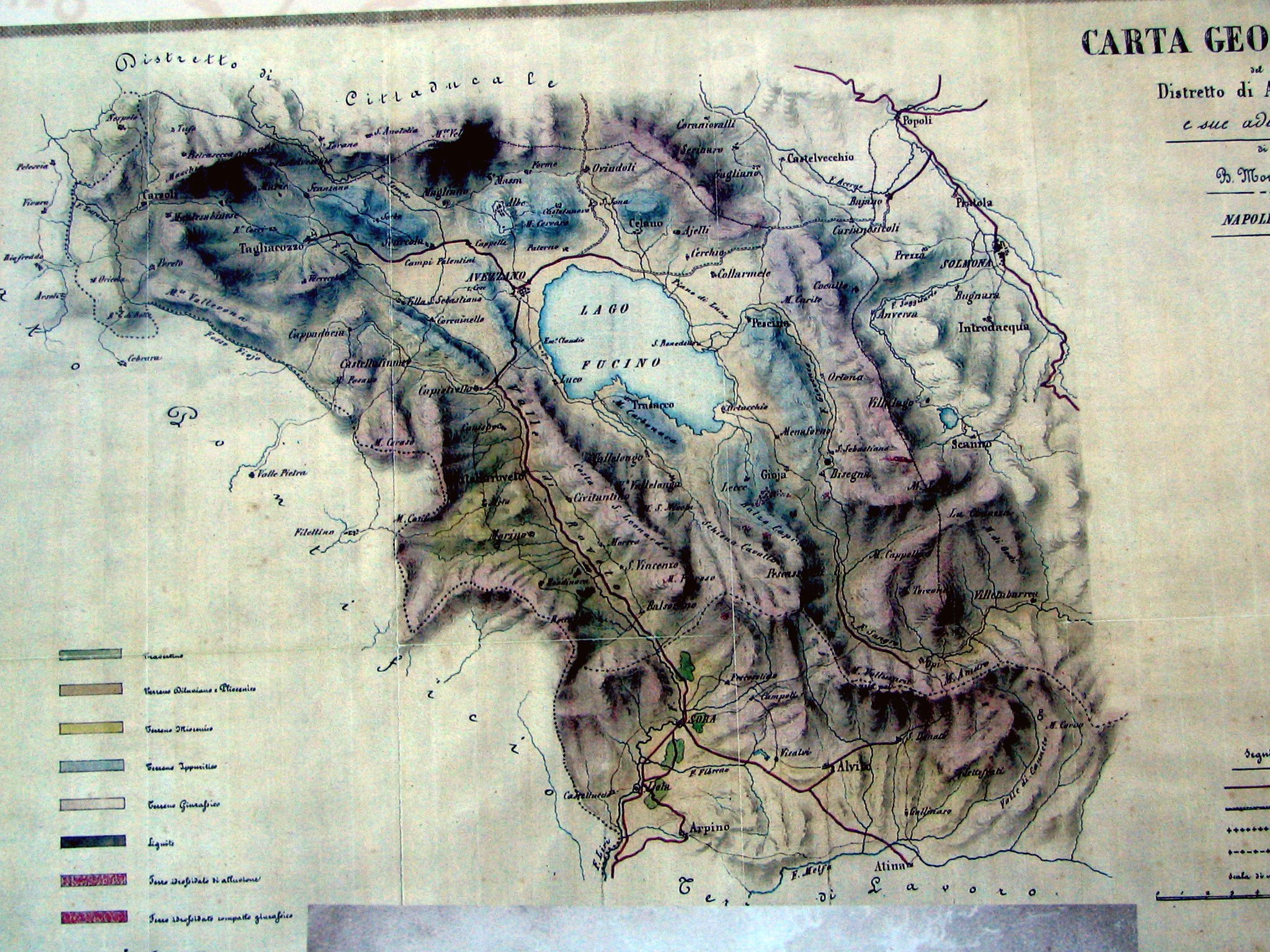
Alessandro Torlonia became the Prince of Fucino in 1875 because he financed the draining of Lake Fucino 1862–75, seen in this map.

Prince Don Alessandro Raffaele Torlonia, Prince of Fucino, Prince of Civitella-Cesi, Duke of Ceri (January 1, 1800 – February 7, 1886) was an Italian nobleman of the House of Torlonia. He was the son of Giovanni Torlonia, 1st Prince di Civitella-Cesi (1754–1829).

== Life ==
Born January 1, 1800, his father was Giovanni Torlonia, 1st Prince of Civitella-Cesi, and his mother Anna Maria Chiaveri née Schulteiss, a widow who came from a family of southern German merchants from the city of Donaueschingen.

In 1829, Alessandro Torlonia inherited a vast fortune from his father. This came mainly from banking. In the subsequent years 1832–42, Alessandro greatly expanded Villa Torlonia which had been started by his father in 1806, and he increased his wealth primarily by acquiring the monopoly on salt and tobacco in the Rome and Naples areas. It was Alessandro Torlonia who financed the draining of the Fucine Lake 1862–73, thus removing a major factor for malaria. According to the North Otago Times, it was common to hear in Rome:

"O Torlonia secca ll lago Fucino, o il lago Fucino secca Torlonia" — ("Either Torlonia will drain the Fucine lake, or the Fucine lake will drain Torlonia") --North Otago Times, Volume VIII, Issue 202, 30 April 1867, Page 3

This action subsequently enabled Cerchio families to farm the lake bed's rich soils under the Torlonia Administration. For this, Victor Emmanuel II of Italy offered Alessandro a special one-off gold medal and the title Prince of Fucino.

Alessandro married the princess Donna Teresa Colonna-Doria (Rome, 22 July 1823-Rome, 17 March 1875) in Rome on 16 July 1840. She was of the Roman Colonna family. They had two children, Anna Maria (1855–1901) who in 1872 married Giulio Borghese (1847–1914), and Giovanna Giacinta Carolina (1856–1875). Alessandro died in Rome on 7 February 1886. Upon his death, his Princely title passed to Don Augusto Torlonia, 3rd Prince of Civitella Cesi, a grandson of Alessandro's older brother, Giulio. His title of Prince of Fucino went to his son-in-law, Giulio (1847–1914) who became the 2nd Prince of Fucino.

According to one account, sometime in the early 19th century a member of the Torlonia family became seriously ill and the Franciscan friars were asked to bring the Santo Bambino of Aracoeli to the sick bed. The friars obliged, and the person recovered. Thereafter, Prince Alessandro used a carriage that belonged to Pope Leo XIII to spend his Thursdays bringing the image on "house calls" to the sick who were unable to get to the Basilica of Santa Maria in Aracoeli. Until the beginning of the 20th century a coach of Prince Torlonia stood ready day and night to bring the Bambino to the bedside of a sick person.

== Torlonia Collection ==
Alessandro Torlonia was a great collector of Greek and Roman antiquities, purchasing or excavating quantities of sculpture to add to the Torlonia Collection. In 1866, Prince Alessandro purchased the Villa Albani, which contained many outstanding Graeco-Roman artifacts assembled by the late Cardinal Alessandro Albani, a nephew of Pope Clement XI. He resumed excavations or initiated new ones at numerous Torlonia family properties. These included the Quadraro and Caffarella estates, the Villa of Maxentius, and the Villa of the Quintilii. He expanded excavations at Portus, the site of imperial Rome's main sea port, which unearthed important new artifacts for the collection.

In 1875, he opened the Torlonia Museum on Via della Lungara in Rome, granting visitors and scholars limited access. Under his patronage, the collection was catalogued for the first time by the archaeologist E.L. Visconti. The catalog went through several editions edited by Visconti and his nephew Carlo Ludovico; the last of them, published in 1884, was a lavishly illustrated volume which Prince Alessandro donated to archaeological institutes and an array of private individuals. New acquisitions were made until 1884, when the collection numbered 620 works.

== See also ==
- 1832 Rothschild loan to the Holy See
