= Dentil =

Small block used as a repeating ornament in the bedmould of a cornice

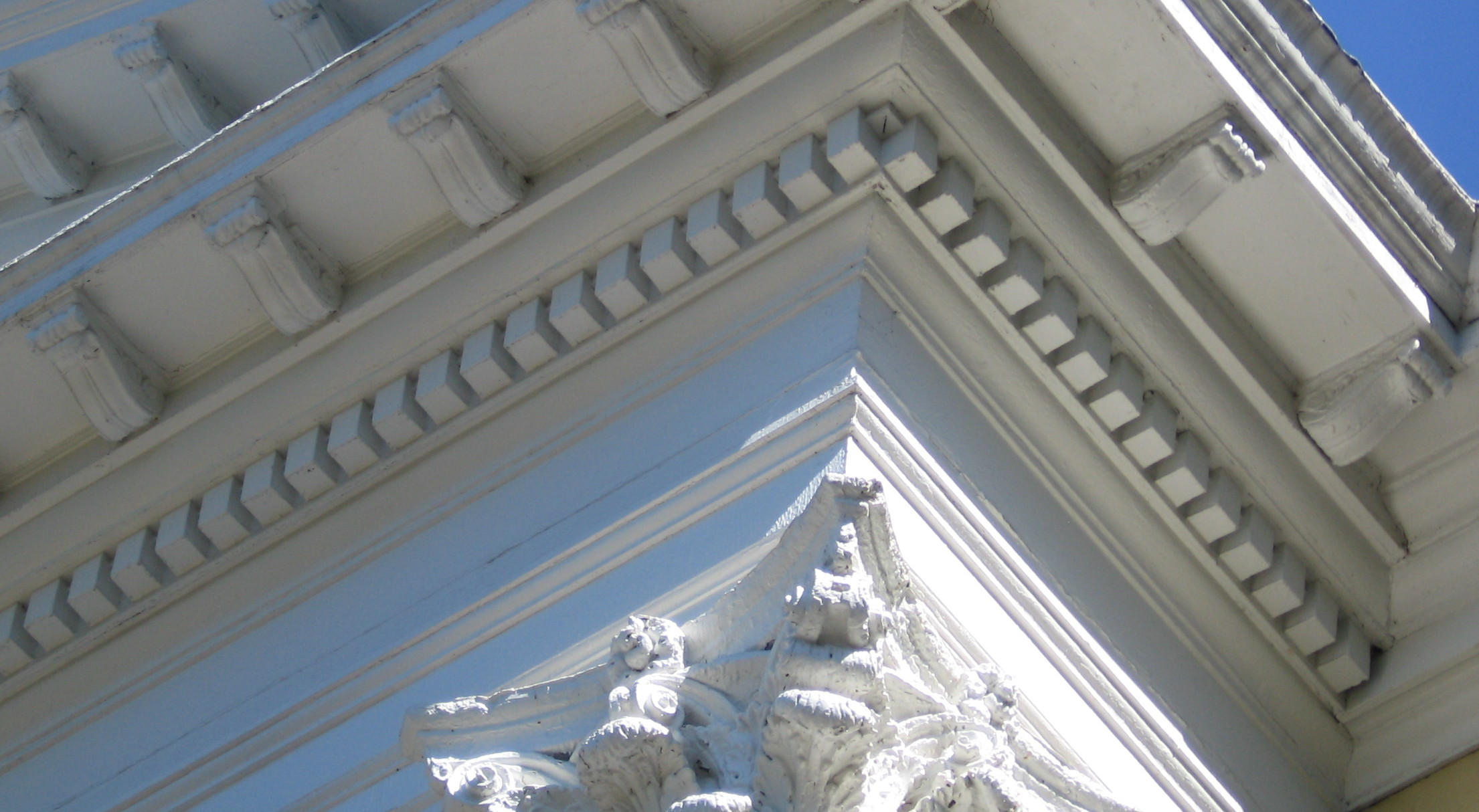
Closeup of dentils, above a Corinthian order capital, Town Hall, Westport, Connecticut, U.S.

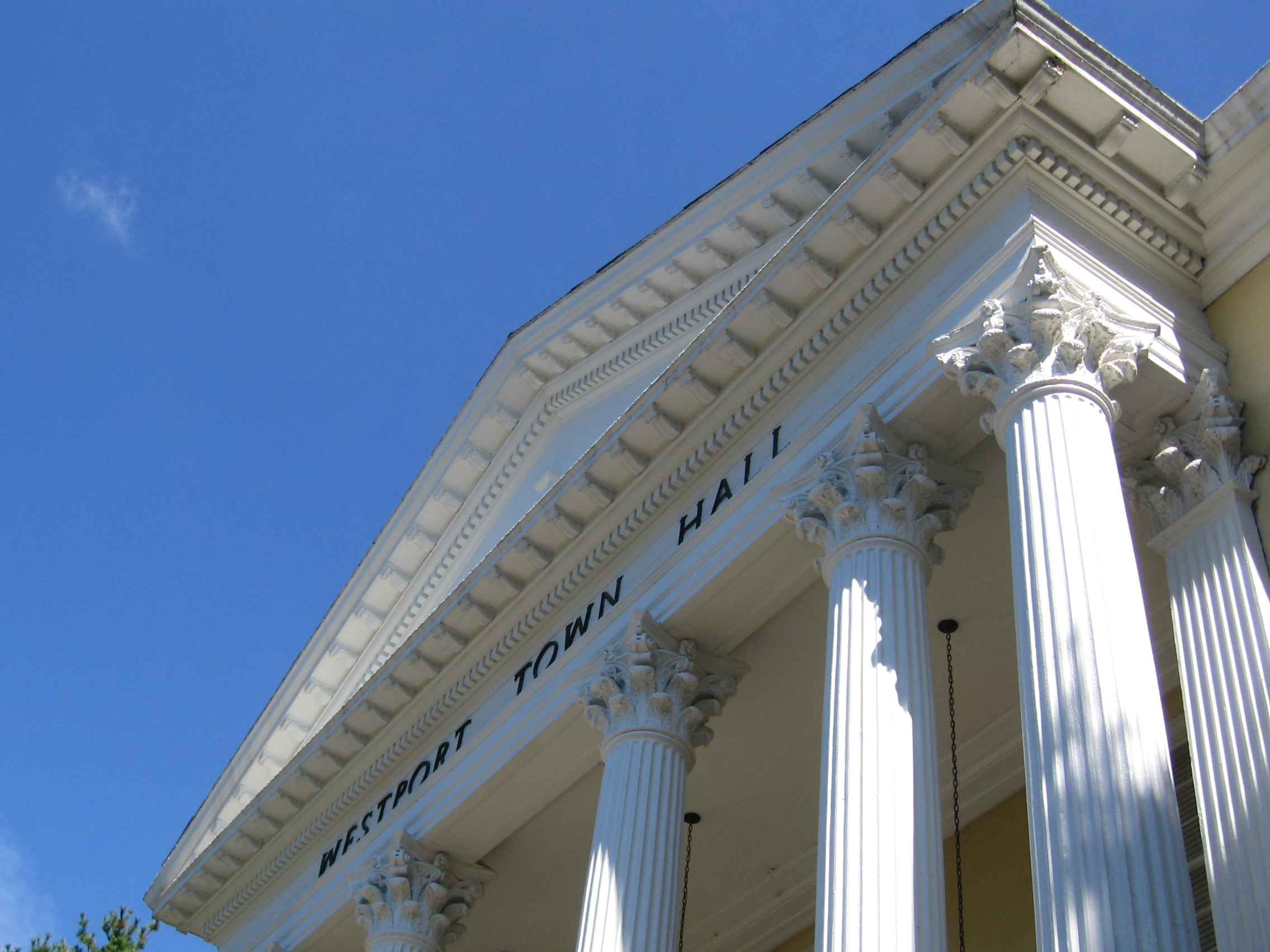
Long view of same

A dentil (from Lat. dens, a tooth) is a small block used as a repeating ornament in the bedmould of a cornice. Dentils are found in ancient Greek and Roman architecture, and also in later styles such as Neoclassical, Federal, Georgian Revival, Greek Revival, Renaissance Revival, Second Empire, and Beaux-Arts architecture. Dentillation refers to use of a course of dentils.

== History ==
=== Origin ===
The Roman architect Vitruvius (iv. 2) states that the dentil represents the end of a rafter (asser). It occurs in its most pronounced form in the Ionic temples of Asia Minor, the Lycian tombs, and the porticoes and tombs of Persia, where it clearly represents the reproduction in stone of timber construction. The earliest example is found carved into the rock of the tomb of Darius, c. 500 BC, reproducing the portico of his palace. Its first employment in Athens is in the cornice of the caryatid portico of the Erechtheum (480 BC). When subsequently introduced into the bed-mould of the cornice of the Choragic Monument of Lysicrates it is much smaller in its dimensions. In the later temples of Ionia, as in the temple of Priene, the larger scale of the dentil is still retained.

=== Later use ===
The dentil was the chief feature employed in the bedmould by the Romans and in the Italian Renaissance architecture. As a general rule, the projection of the dentil is equal to its width, thus appearing square, and the intervals between are half this measure. In some cases, the projecting band has never had the sinkings cut into it to divide up the dentils, as in the Pantheon at Rome, and it is then called a dentil-band. In the porch of the Studion cathedral at Constantinople, the dentil and the interval between are equal in width, and the interval is splayed back from top to bottom; this is the form it takes in what is known as the Venetian dentil, which was copied from the Byzantine dentil in Santa Sophia, Constantinople. There, however, it no longer formed part of a bed-mould: its use at Santa Sophia was to decorate the projecting moulding enclosing the encrusted marbles, and the dentils were cut alternately on both sides of the moulding. The Venetian dentil was also introduced as a label round arches and as a string course.

== Gallery ==
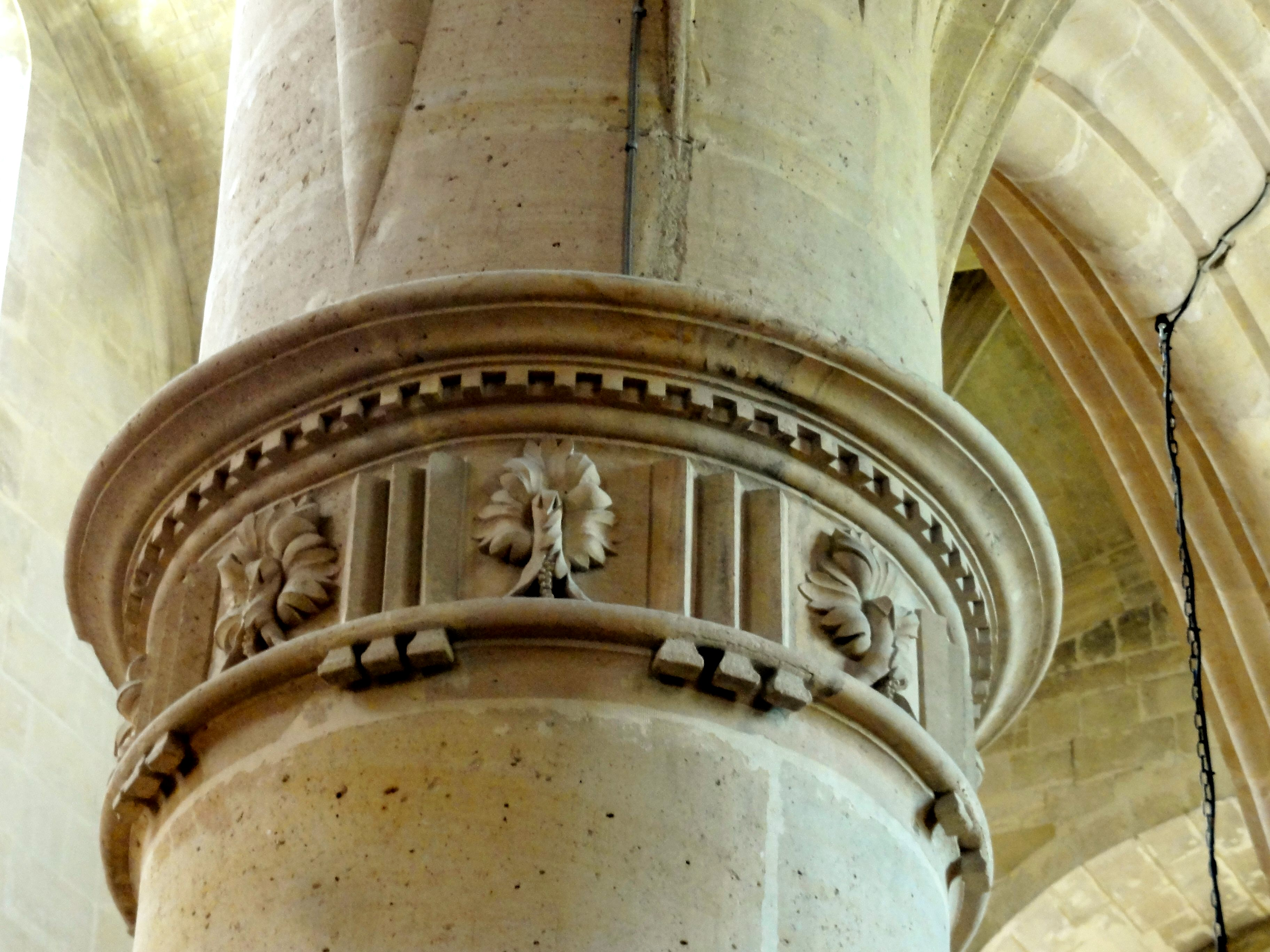
Dentilwork with a frieze on a column, in the Église Saint-Martin de L'Isle-Adam from L'Isle-Adam (Val-d'Oise, Île-de-France, France)

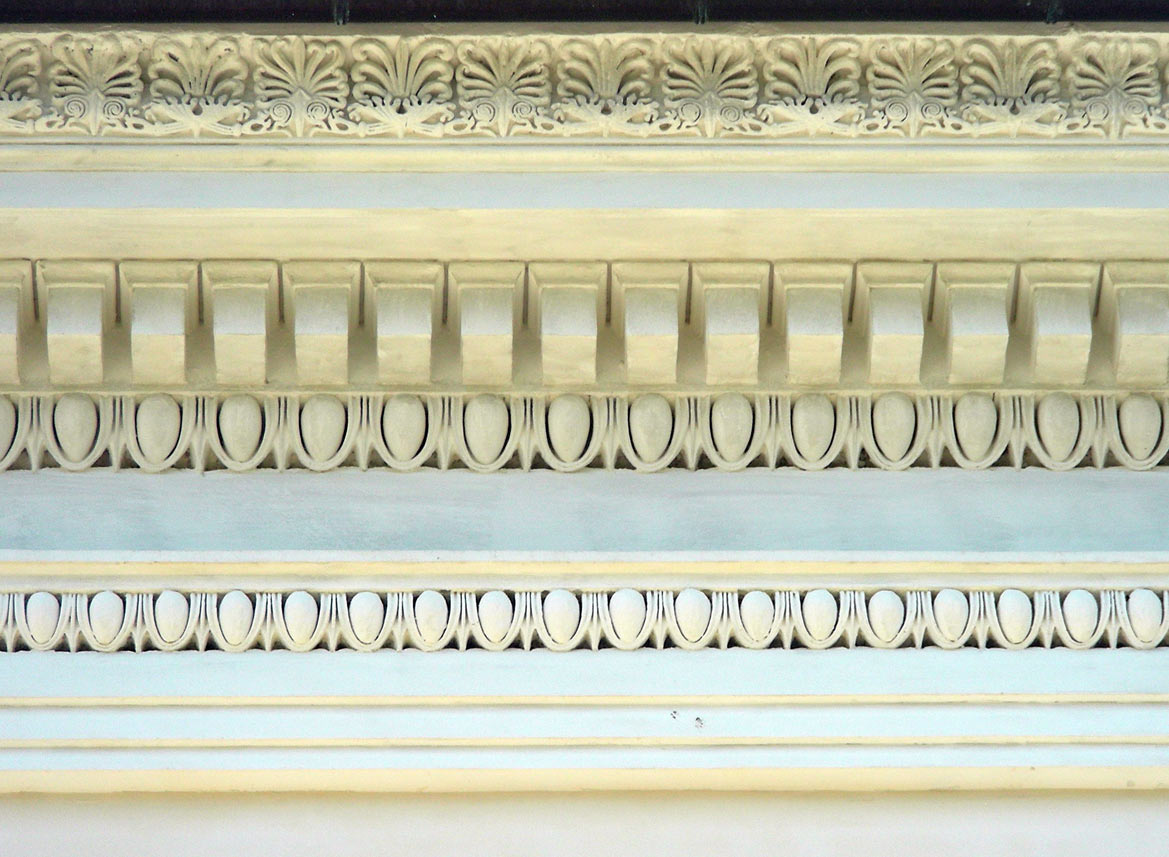
Dentils with egg-and-dart patterns on an entablature at Casino nobile of Villa Torlonia from Rome

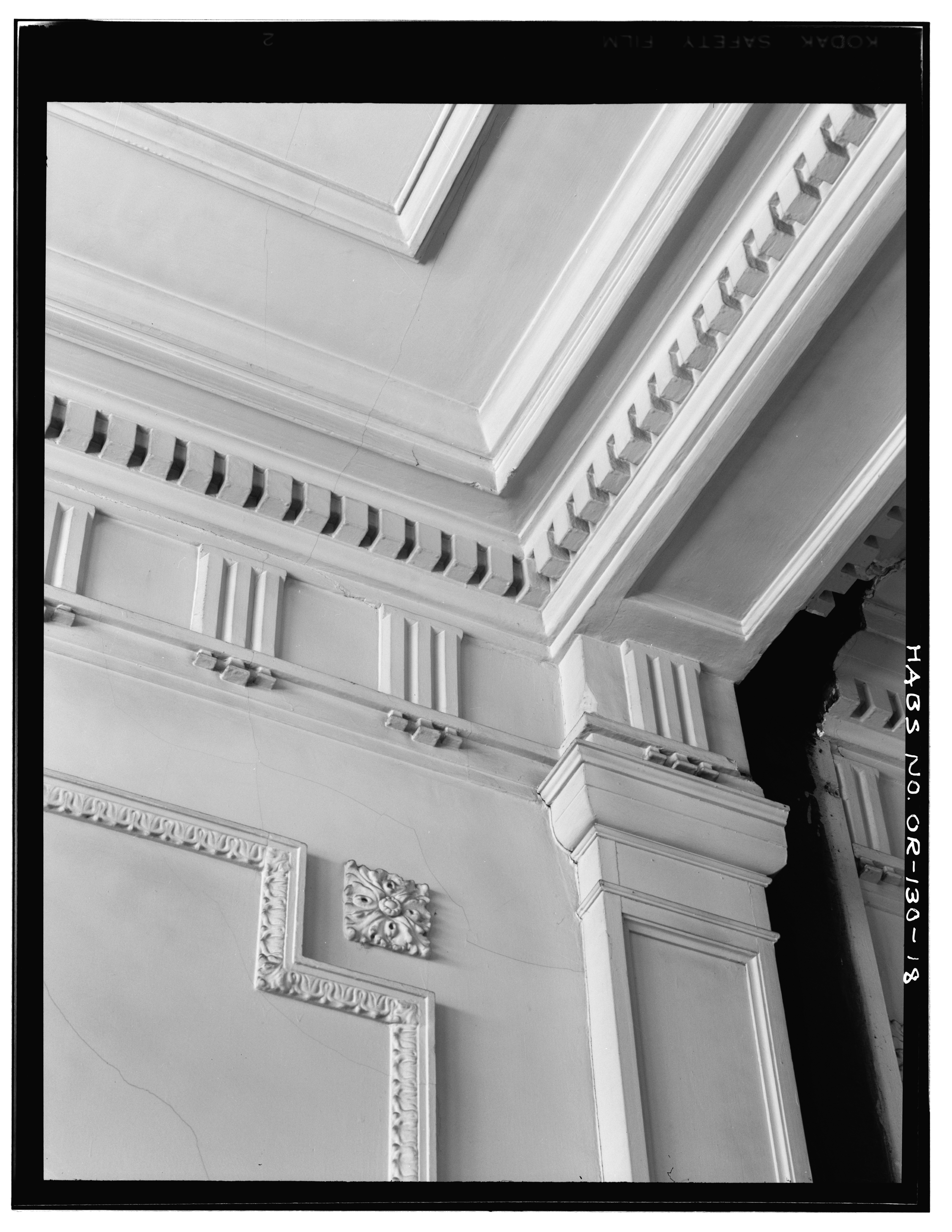
Interior dentilwork

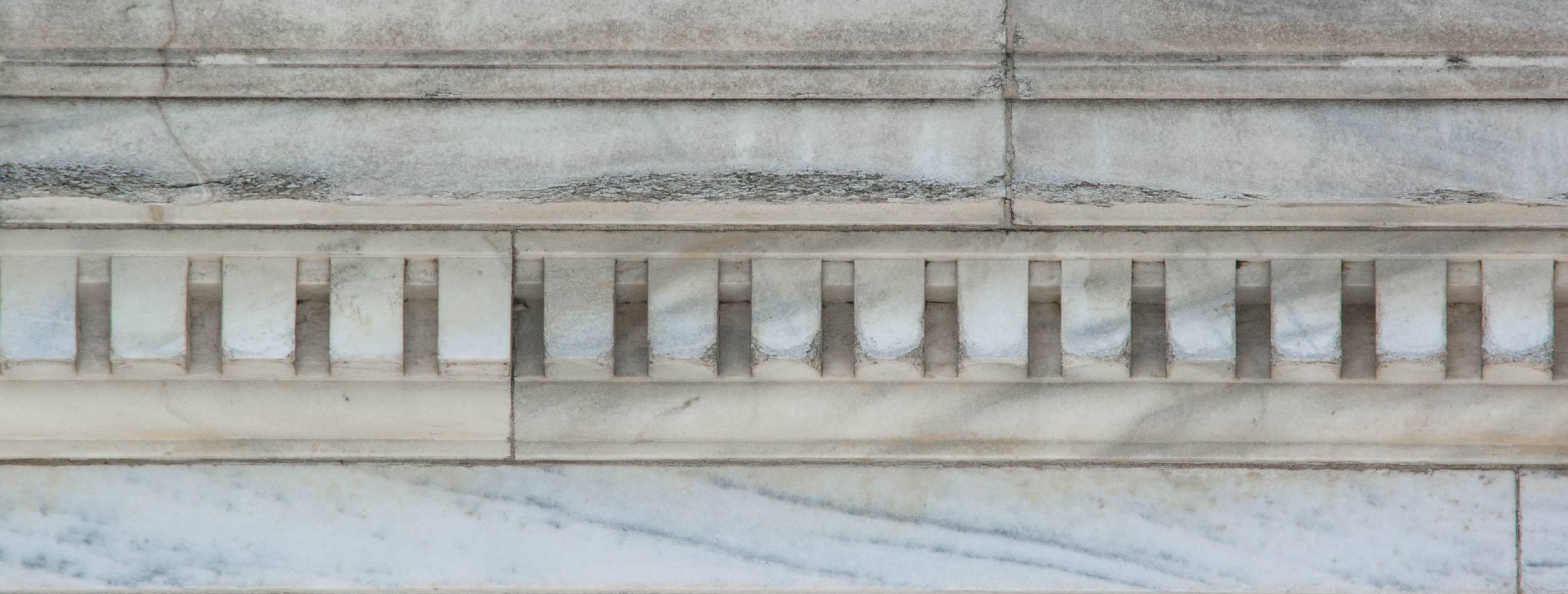
Dentils on the exterior of the Cleveland Museum of Art (Ohio, US)

== See also ==
- Modillions – more ornate
- Corbel table – more ornate and taller
- Dog-tooth – arch decorations
