= Cerchio =

- Comune
- Comune di Cerchio
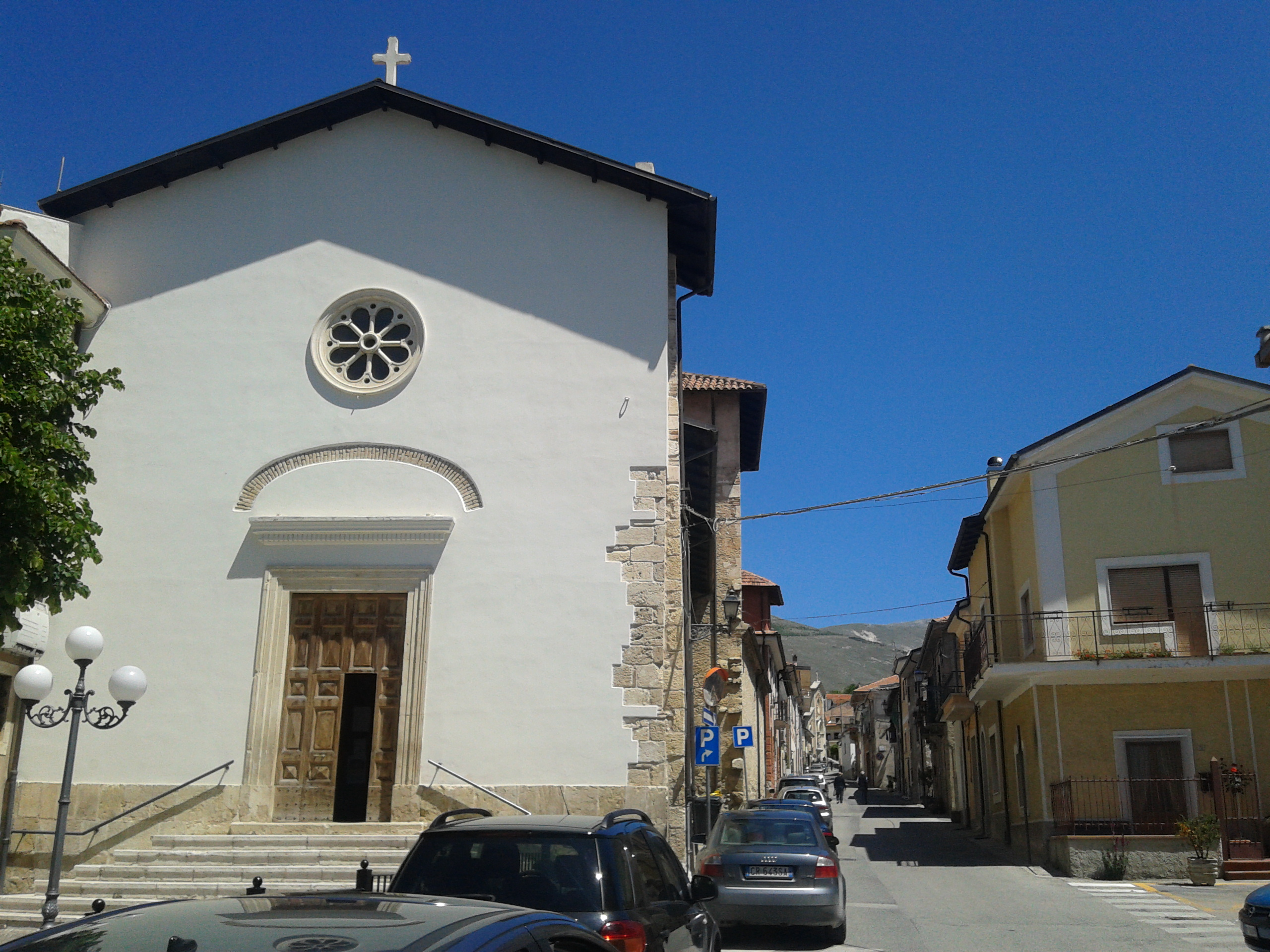
- Church of Madonna delle Grazie.

- Location within Italy Location within Abruzzo
- Coordinates: 42°3′43″N 13°36′9″E
- Country: Italy
- Region: Abruzzo
- Province: L'Aquila (AQ)

Government
  - Mayor: Gianfranco Tedeschi

Area
  - Total: 20.12 km^{2} (7.77 sq mi)
- Elevation: 834 m (2,736 ft)

Population (31 July 2015)
  - Total: 1,634
  - Density: 81.21/km^{2} (210.3/sq mi)
- Demonym: Cerchiesi
- Time zone: UTC+1 (CET)
  - Summer (DST): UTC+2 (CEST)
- Postal code: 67044
- Dialing code: 0863
- Saint day: 29 June
- Website: Official website

Cerchio (Abruzzese: Circhië) is a comune and town in the province of L'Aquila in the Abruzzo region of southern Italy.

== Geography ==
The village is situated on the lower slopes of Mt. Sirente, overlooking the Fucino plain. Present population is 1645 (2013). Patron saints of the town are S. Giovanni and S. Paolo (John and Paul).

== History ==
Local legend says that the town arose from a small group of houses constructed around a theater (circo) set up by the Romans to celebrate the inauguration of Emperor Claudius, who drained the ancient Fucine Lake. The Church of S. Bartolomeo is mentioned in a papal bull of 1300. During the medieval period the village was held by the Colonna and Piccolomini families of Rome, who granted it to Camilla Peretti in 1591, along with the County of Celano and the Barony of Pescina. Over the centuries the Fucino plain was resubmerged, until it was drained in the mid-nineteenth century by Alessandro Torlonia, 2nd Prince di Civitella-Cesi. Families from Cerchio then farmed the rich soils of the lake bed, working as tenant farmers, sharecroppers and day-laborers under the Torlonia Administration. The town was badly damaged by the earthquake of 1915.

== Climate ==
Climate data for Cerchio, elevation 834 m (2,736 ft), (1951–2000)
Month	Jan	Feb	Mar	Apr	May	Jun	Jul	Aug	Sep	Oct	Nov	Dec	Year
Record high °C (°F)	19.5 (67.1)	22.0 (71.6)	30.0 (86.0)	32.0 (89.6)	31.5 (88.7)	42.0 (107.6)	39.5 (103.1)	39.0 (102.2)	36.0 (96.8)	36.0 (96.8)	24.5 (76.1)	20.0 (68.0)	42.0 (107.6)
Mean daily maximum °C (°F)	6.6 (43.9)	8.0 (46.4)	11.4 (52.5)	14.3 (57.7)	19.5 (67.1)	23.6 (74.5)	26.7 (80.1)	27.3 (81.1)	23.2 (73.8)	17.8 (64.0)	11.3 (52.3)	7.0 (44.6)	16.4 (61.5)
Daily mean °C (°F)	2.5 (36.5)	3.4 (38.1)	6.3 (43.3)	8.9 (48.0)	13.4 (56.1)	17.0 (62.6)	19.6 (67.3)	20.1 (68.2)	16.7 (62.1)	12.1 (53.8)	6.8 (44.2)	3.1 (37.6)	10.8 (51.5)
Mean daily minimum °C (°F)	−1.7 (28.9)	−1.1 (30.0)	1.2 (34.2)	3.5 (38.3)	7.4 (45.3)	10.5 (50.9)	12.6 (54.7)	13.0 (55.4)	10.2 (50.4)	6.4 (43.5)	2.4 (36.3)	−0.7 (30.7)	5.3 (41.6)
Record low °C (°F)	−14.0 (6.8)	−15.5 (4.1)	−12.0 (10.4)	−8.0 (17.6)	−5.0 (23.0)	−1.0 (30.2)	1.5 (34.7)	0.0 (32.0)	−4.0 (24.8)	−6.0 (21.2)	−11.0 (12.2)	−14.0 (6.8)	−15.5 (4.1)
Average precipitation mm (inches)	47.1 (1.85)	57.1 (2.25)	47.9 (1.89)	57.5 (2.26)	43.3 (1.70)	39.7 (1.56)	26.7 (1.05)	27.9 (1.10)	51.1 (2.01)	66.3 (2.61)	95.8 (3.77)	81.6 (3.21)	642 (25.26)
Average precipitation days	7.1	7.9	7.9	9.2	7.9	6.0	4.5	4.3	5.9	7.0	9.6	9.2	86.5
Source: Regione Abruzzo

== See also ==
- Museo civico di Cerchio
