= Giovanni Raimondo Torlonia =

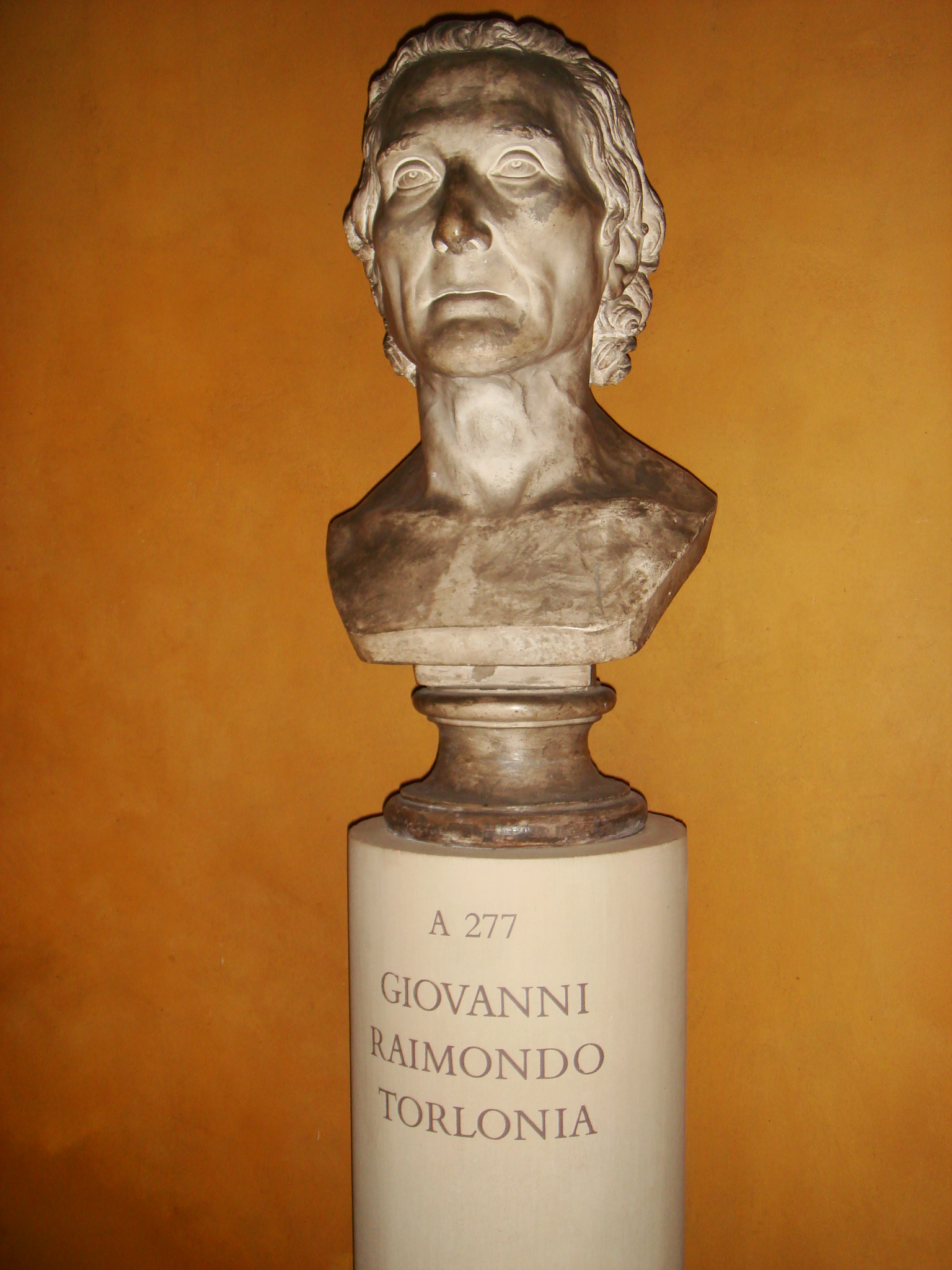
Torlonia's portrait by Bertel Thorvaldsen

Giovanni Raimondo Torlonia (May 1755 – February 25, 1829) was a famous Franco-Italian banker to the Holy See who founded the noble Torlonia family.

In 1785 he inherited the fortune of his father Marino Torlonia (1725–1785; in early life Benoît Marin Tourlonias, of Augerolles, France), who had become a successful businessman and banker in Rome. As a reward for the administration of the Vatican finances, in 1794 he became a noble of the Holy Roman Empire and Pope Pius VI created him Count of Pisciarelli; in 1803 Pope Pius VII further created him Marquis of Romavecchia and Turrita and 1st Prince (Princeps Romanus) of Civitella Cesi; he bought in 1803 the Duchy of Bracciano; in 1809 he was elevated to Patrician (with confirmation of that honor by Pius VII on January 19, 1813) and in 1820 became Duke of Poli and Guadagnolo, with other titles.

He was the builder of the Villa Torlonia in Rome (started 1806), and he acquired the Palazzo Bolognetti-Torlonia in 1807, as well as other Torlonia villas.

In 1793 he married Anna Maria Schultheiss (1760–1840), and they had five children:

- Maria Teresa (born 1794)
- Marino (1796–1860) who in 1847 became Duke of Poli and Guadagnolo
- Carlo (1798–1848),
- Alessandro Torlonia, 2nd Prince of Civitella-Cesi (1800–1886), who inherited his fathers princely title in 1829,
- Maria Luisa (1804–1883).
