= Villa Torlonia =

Villa Torlonia is a name of several country retreats of the princely family of Torlonia on the outskirts of Rome and in Frascati (Lazio), including:

- Villa Torlonia, Avezzano
- Villa Torlonia, Frascati
- In Rome:
  - Villa Albani-Torlonia, with its entrance in Via Salaria, better known by its former name, the Villa Albani
  - Villa Torlonia, Rome
  - Villa Torlonia in Porta Pia, also known as Villa Bracciano, now the British Embassy
- Villa Torlonia, San Mauro Pascoli
