= Giustiniani Hestia =

Antique sculpture

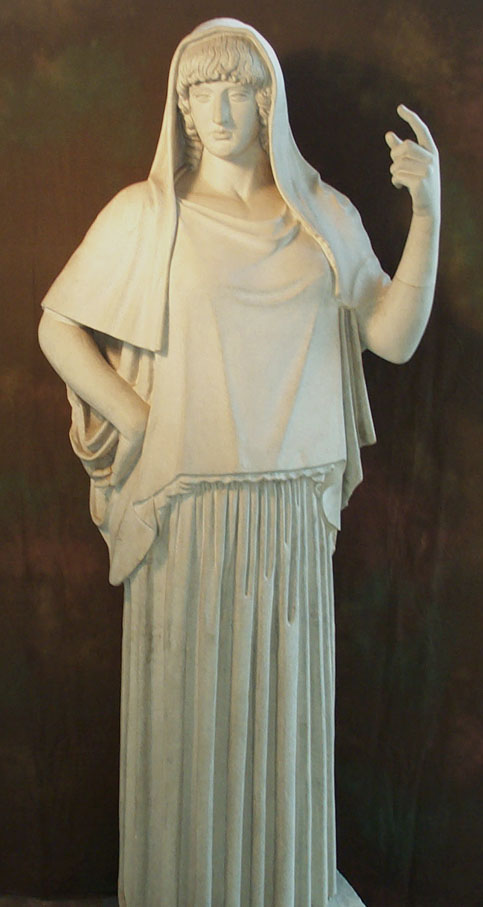
Hestia Giustiniani

The Giustiniani Hestia is a finely-executed marble sculpture, a perhaps Hadrianic Roman copy of a Greek bronze of about 470 BC, now in the Torlonia Collection (see Torlonia Museum), Rome, but named for its early owner, marchese Vincenzo Giustiniani. It is the only known Early Classical bronze that was reproduced at full size in marble for a Roman collection: Roman taste ran more towards the Hellenistic baroque.

== Description ==
Winckelmann cited the Hestia Giustiniani as an example of the austere early stage of Classical Greek sculpture. For female figures, early fifth-century sculptors mostly gave up the crinkly sleeved chiton, which had been popular in the later sixth century BCE, and returned to the sleeveless peplos with heavy, dominantly vertical folds not unlike the fluting of a column. With the body so shrouded the relaxation of pose has been limited to turning the head. Several Attic or Argive sculptors have been speculatively suggested as the author of the lost original.

== History ==
The sculpture was known in the Giustiniani collection in Palazzo Giustiniani, Rome, from the early 1630s, the date of a drawing made for the antiquarian Cassiano dal Pozzo and was illustrated in the engraved catalogue of the Galleria Giustiniani, produced under the direction of Joachim von Sandrart in two deluxe volumes, 1635–36 and 1638 In its first appearance in a Giustiniani inventory, 1638, it was a "vergine vestale vestita, di marmo greco tutta antica alta palmi 9" (quoted by Lachenal), "a clothed Vestal Virgin, of Greek marble wholly antique, height 9 palmi." The sculpture appeared in François Perrier, Segmenta nobilium signorum (Paris and Rome, 1638), plate lxxii. The Hestia was purchased from the Giustiniani heirs in the nineteenth century and re-erected in Palazzo Lungara, where it was described by Ennio Quirino Visconti. It was removed to the Torlonia Villa Albani after World War II and was reinstalled in the 1990s in the courtyard of the Palazzo Torlonia in via della Conciliazione.

== Identification ==
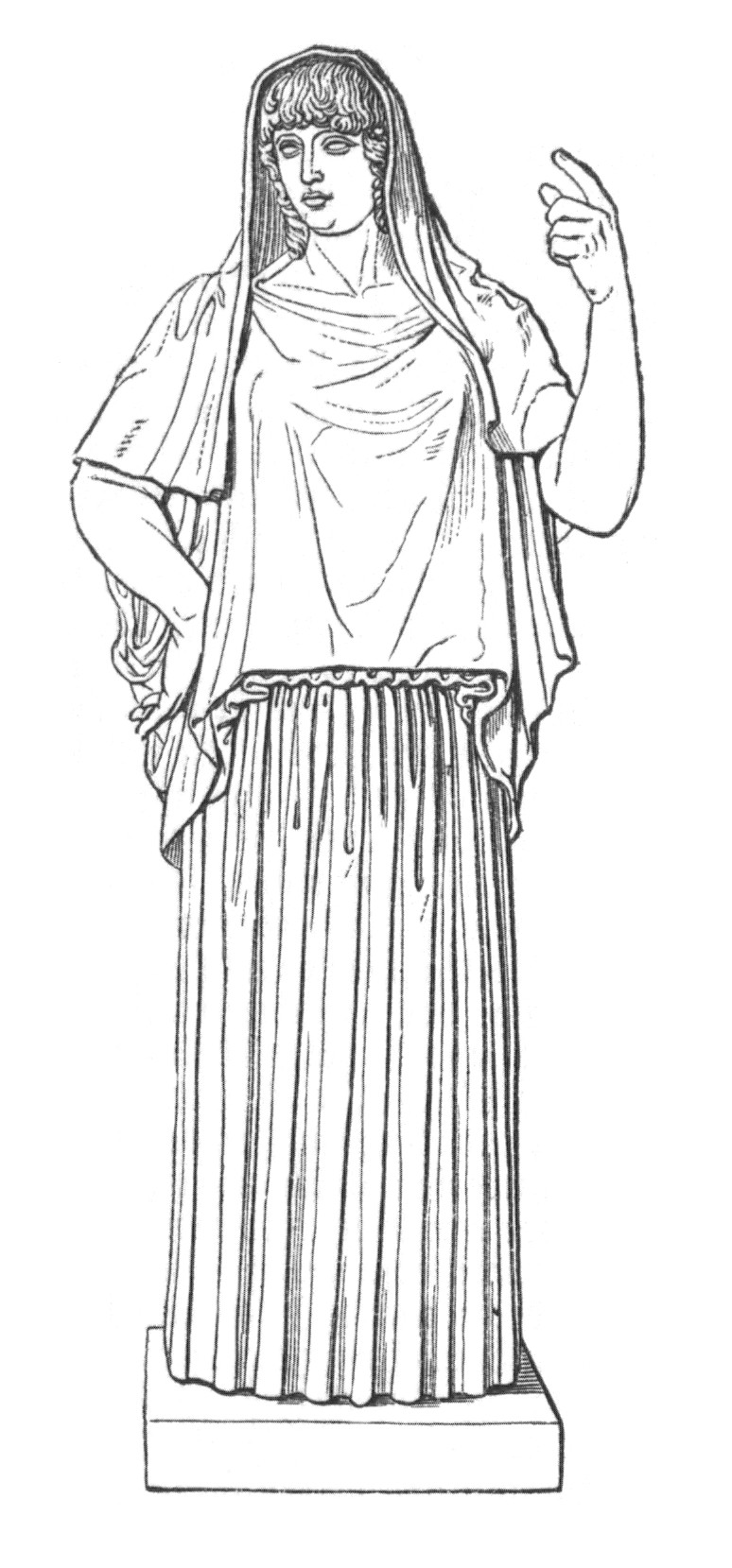
The Giustiniani Hestia in O. Seyffert, Dictionary of Classical Antiquities, 1894

Contemporary scholars are less certain about the sculpture's identification as Hestia, in part because of literary references to her imageless sanctuaries, though a similar figure is painted on a cup at Berlin attributed to the Sosias Painter (Lachenal): Demeter and Hera are alternative candidates. Often such attribution issues are skirted in modern scholarship by designating such sculptures simply as peplophoroi ("peplum-wearers")
