= Villa Torlonia Catacombs =

Catacomb in Rome, Italy

The Villa Torlonia Catacombs are ancient Jewish underground cemetery discovered in the grounds of the Villa Torlonia on the Via Nomentana in Rome in 1919. Excavations continued until 1930, and were resumed by padre Umberto M. Fasola in 1973-1974.

The complex consists of two Jewish catacombs that are interconnected. It stretches over more than 13.000 m², contains over 100 inscriptions, and 4100 tombs. The upper catacomb is known for its frescoes that display a variety of Jewish symbols including a magnificent rendering of the Torah Shrine. They are not open to the public due to their instability and the presence of toxic gases such as radon, helium and carbon dioxide.

A team from University of Utrecht under the direction of Leonard V. Rutgers has radiocarbon dated wood from the stucco covering many of the tombs to place the complex's construction between the 1st century BCE and the 1st century CE, thus predating Christian use of this burial method. Radiocarbon dating suggests they may have been used until the 5th century CE.
