= Museo civico di Cerchio =

Museum of religious art in Cerchio, Italy

Coordinates: 42.0639°N 13.6003°E

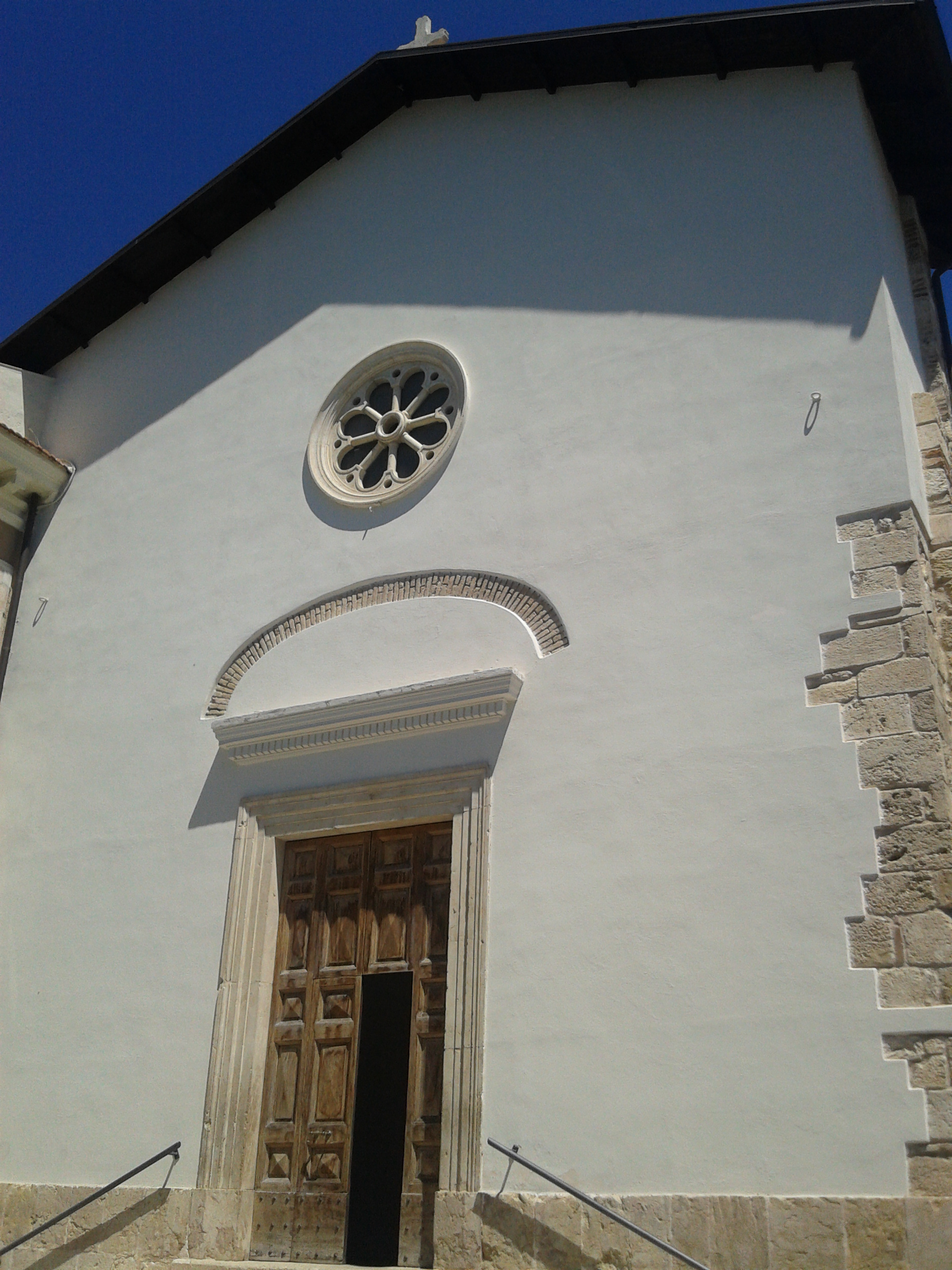
- Museo civico di Cerchio

- Location within Abruzzo
- Location: Cerchio
- Type: Religious art

Museo civico di Cerchio (Italian for Civic Museum of Cerchio) is a museum of religious art in Cerchio, Province of L'Aquila (Abruzzo).

== History ==
The history of the museum begins after the 1915 earthquake: the vault of the Church of the Madonna delle Grazie collapsed and was subsequently restored. During the restoration, works from the same church and other city places of worship were stored in some rooms of the church. In the rooms next to the mother church of Santa Maria delle Grazie, once home to a convent of the Discalced Augustinians, one part was reserved for the prior's residence, while the other housed the museum of sacred art. At the end of World War II, the liberated rooms hosted collections of silverware and costumes, while the cloister was set up as a museum of farming and pastoral traditions.

The civic museum, initiated by historian Fiorenzo Amiconi and officially established on October 21, 1986, is housed in six rooms. The collected works range roughly from the 14th to the 19th century. In 1990, the interior museum space was expanded with the ethnographic section and the section on farming and pastoral civilization, and later with the section dedicated to the Republic of Italy.

The museum, which was closed for a period after the 2009 L'Aquila earthquake, was restored and reopened on September 1, 2018.

== Collection ==
Room 1

- Madonna with Child (19th century)
- Saint Thaddeus (18th century)
- Nativity (Marcus Antonius, 16th century)
- Saint (18th century)
- Madonna of Carmel (1646?)
- Madonna of the Belt and Saints (17th–18th century)
- Saint Nicholas (1763)

Room 2

- Saint Charles Borromeo (18th century)
- Saint Roch (Paolo De Matteis, circa 17th century)
- Saint Clare of Montefalco (18th century)
- Saint Gregory the Great and the Virgin Mary (18th century)
- Statue of the Sorrowful Madonna (19th century)
- Sculpture Deposed Christ (18th–19th century)

Room 3

- Piano (19th century)
- Madonna of Carmel (18th century)
- Bust of Saint Vincent Ferrer (19th century)
- Saint Helena (19th century)
- Immaculate Conception (19th century)
- Statue of Saint Emidius (18th century)
- Saint Fulgentius (18th century)

Room 4

- Holy Family and Angels (18th century)
- Holy Family (17th–18th century)
- Martyrdom of Saints John and Paul, Patrons [Franciscus Septi, (Ercole Setti), 1612]
- Sculptures of Saints John and Paul (18th century)

Room 5

- Sculpture Saint Francis of Paola (19th century)
- Madonna delle Grazie (19th century)
- Saint Philomena (19th century)
- Madonna of Carmel (19th century)
- Indulgence Bull (14th–15th century)
- Bull (1610)
- Bull of the Confraternity of the Blessed Sacrament (1542)

Room 6

- Antiphonary (13th century)
- Antiphonary (13th–14th century)
- Tabernacle (Giovanni Feneziani, 1903)
- Tabernacle (18th–19th century)
- Tabernacle (18th–19th century)
- Gilded Tabernacle (Giovanni Feneziani, circa 1903)
- Polychrome Gilded Reliquary (18th century)
