= Vincenzo Giustiniani =

Italian banker and art collector

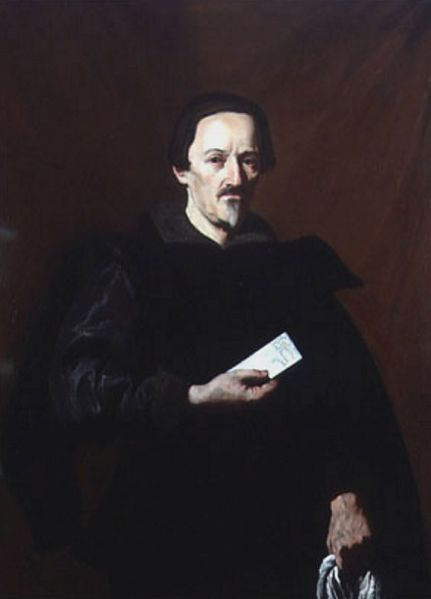
- Giustiniani in a portrait by Nicolas Régnier, c. 1630
- Born: 13 September 1564; Chios
- Died: 27 December 1637 (aged 73); Rome
- Occupations: Banker, art collector
- Years active: 1586–1637
- Known for: Art collection

Vincenzo Giustiniani (13 September 1564 – 27 December 1637) was an aristocratic Italian banker, art collector and intellectual of the late 16th and early 17th centuries, known today largely for the Giustiniani art collection, assembled at the Palazzo Giustiniani, near the Pantheon, in Rome, and at the family palazzo at Bassano by Vincenzo and his brother, Cardinal Benedetto, and for his patronage of the artist Caravaggio.

== Biography ==
Vincenzo's father, Giuseppe Giustiniani, had been the last Genoese ruler of the Aegean island of Chios, which had been a family possession for centuries. In 1566 the island was lost to the Ottomans. On April 14, 1566 an Ottoman fleet under Piali Pasha arrive at the port of Chios and occupied it. The island was pillaged; churches destroyed or converted to mosques. Some members of the family were taken captive and transported to Constantinople. About twenty younger Giustinianis were drafted as janissaries. Three accepted their fate; the other eighteen were killed on September 6, 1566. A painting about their martyrdom is in the Doge's Palace, Genoa.

Vincenzo and his elder brother Benedetto were taken by their father to Rome, where an uncle was already a cardinal. Giuseppe Giustiniani became a banker, and by his death in 1600 was financier to the Vatican and one of the richest men in Rome. Vincenzo Giustiniani followed his father into the family business, while Benedetto entered the Church and became a cardinal himself, 16 November 1586. Both brothers were keen art patrons, and the collection they established became one of the most important in its age. On Giustiniani's death - Benedetto died in 1621 - it contained over 300 paintings (15 by Caravaggio) and more than 1200 pieces of sculpture, and the various catalogues constitute an invaluable resource for early 17th-century art. In 1631, the Galleria Giustiniani was published under supervision of Joachim von Sandrart, in the form of a compilation of engravings of the family's gallery of statuary, most notably the Athena Giustiniani, and the Giustiniani Hestia.

Giustiniani followed interests in many other fields, writing essays in architecture, music, and art, as well as on such practical matters as hunting, travel, and horse trading. A friend and neighbour of Caravaggio's first patron, cardinal Francesco Maria Del Monte, he extended his own friendship to the artist, purchasing Saint Matthew and the Angel when it was rejected by church officials for its perceived lack of decorum.

He died in Rome in 1637.

== Legacy ==
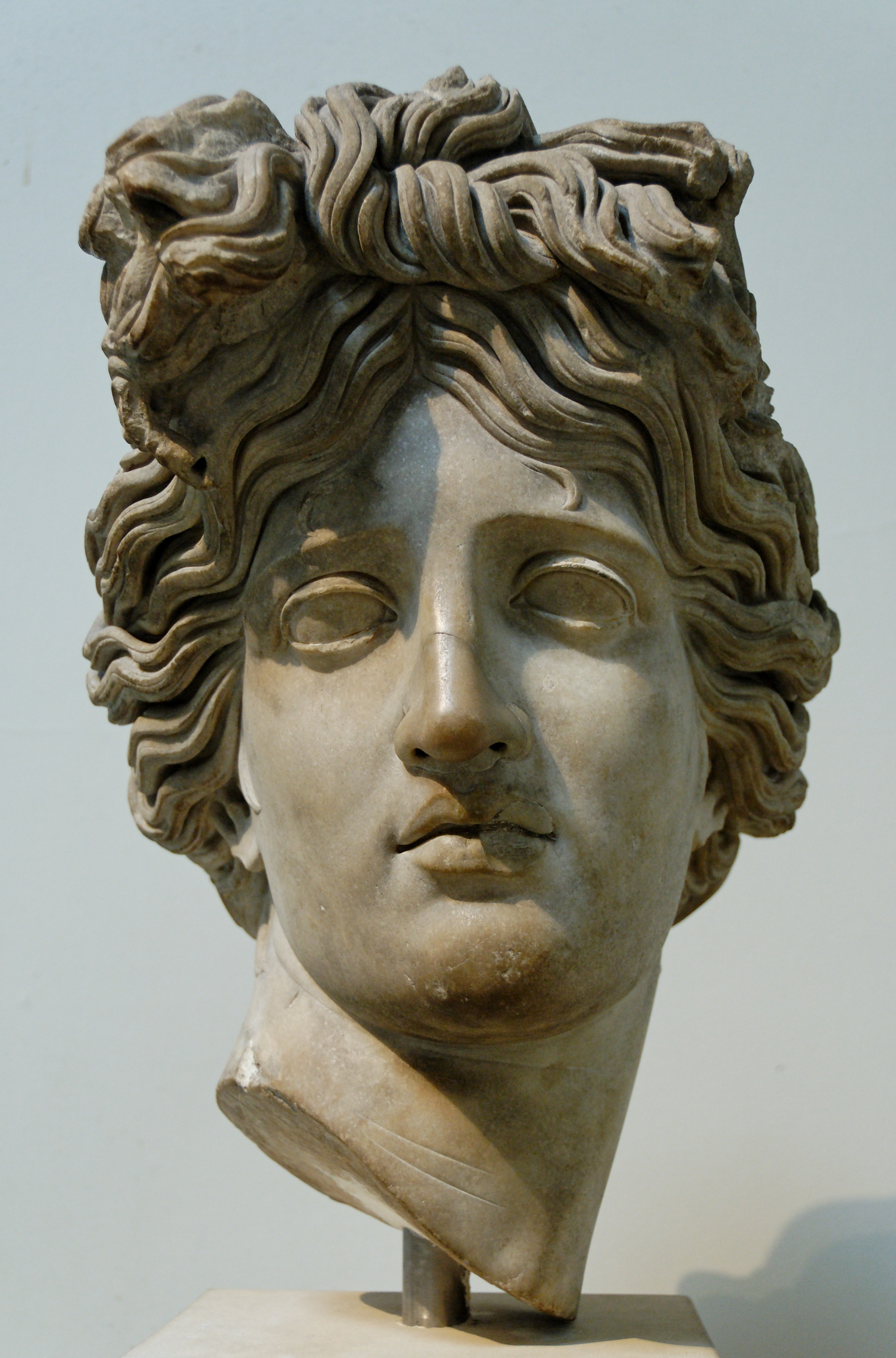
The Giustiniani head of Apollo (now in the British Museum)

The collection itself was broken up at the beginning of the 19th century, when the king of Prussia acquired over 160 paintings, the most important of which were destined for museums in Berlin. Today the Berlin Gemäldegalerie houses 43 paintings from the Giustinani collection, while other works are to be found in Potsdam's Neues Palais and Bildergalerie Sanssouci. Further examples can be seen in the National Gallery, London, the Hermitage Museum, St. Petersburg and the Kunsthistorisches Museum, Vienna. More paintings from the collection have been traced to collections and museums in Europe and the United States.
