= Palazzo Bolognetti-Torlonia =

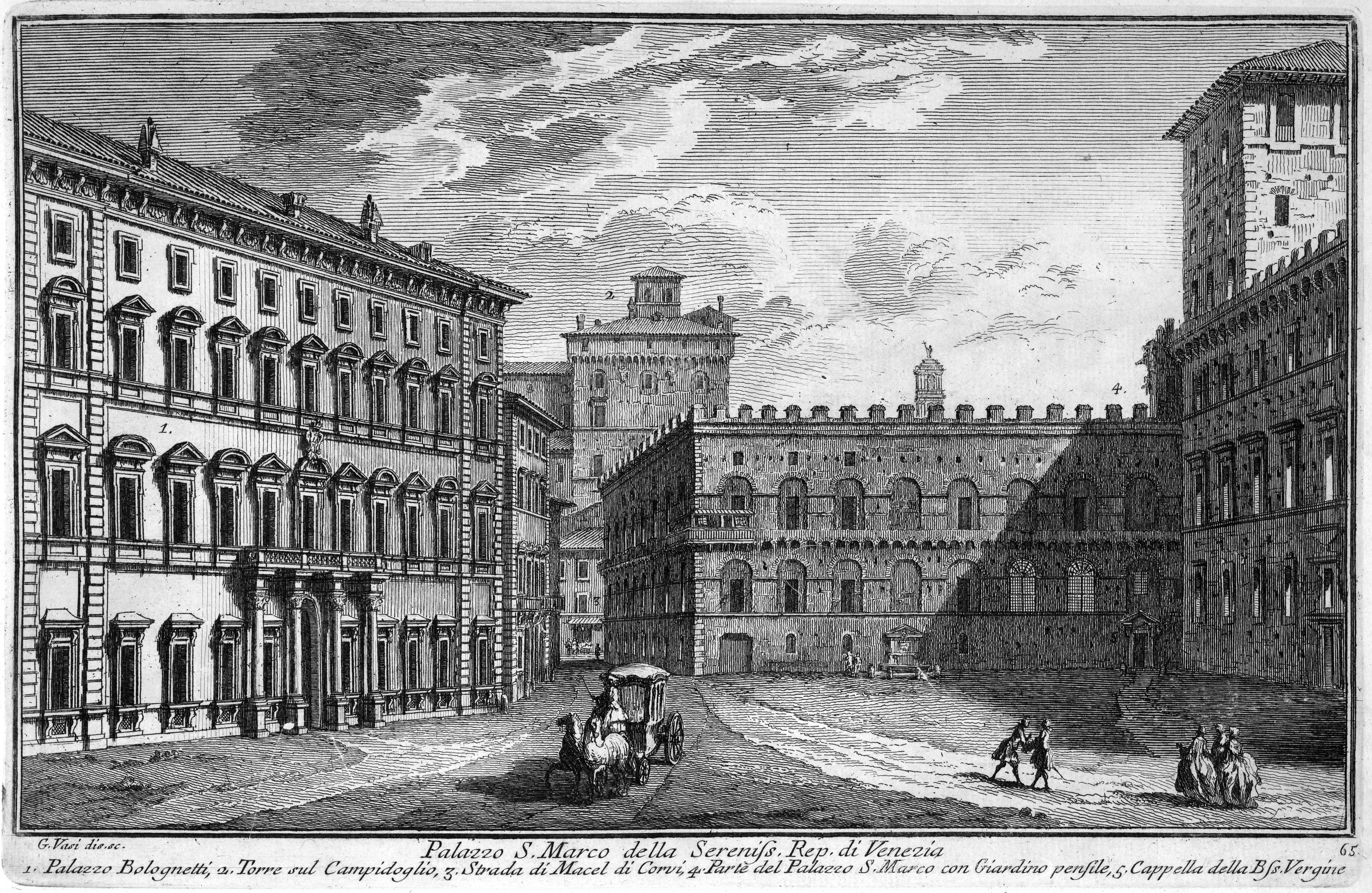
- Engraving by Giuseppe Vasi. Plate No. 65. Original description: 1) Palazzo Bolognetti; 2) Torre sul Campidoglio; 3) Strada di Macel de' Corvi; 4) Palazzetto Venezia; 5) Cappella della Beata Vergine.
- Interactive map of the Palazzo Bolognetti-Torlonia area

General information
- Type: Palace
- Location: Piazza Venezia, Rome, Italy
- Demolished: 1903

Renovating team
- Engineer: Giovanni Battista Caretti

The Palazzo Bolognetti-Torlonia, today demolished, was a palace located in Piazza Venezia, Rome, Italy.

It was acquired in 1807 by the banker Giovanni Torlonia (1755–1829), who added numerous art pieces. The palace underwent restoration by the architect Giovanni Battista Caretti. The frescoes were restored by Francesco Podestà. Employed in the restoration and sculptural decoration were Canova, Thorvaldsen, Tenerani, and Cognetti. Among guests to the palace in those days were the King of Bavaria, Russia aristocrats, and the rulers of Baden.

The building was demolished in 1903, to improve the vista of the Monument to Vittorio Emanuele II from Via del Corso. Before the destruction the pieces and decoration of the palace were photographed, the frescoes on the walls and furniture were sold, while some of the furniture and fresco panels are now in the Museo di Roma at Palazzo Braschi.

The main floor of the palace featured the Gallery of Theseus, the Room of Psyche, the Room of Diana and the Visitors' Room (now reconstructed at Palazzo Braschi). Another wing of the palace was called Gallery dell' Ercole, by Canova, taking its name from the group of statues of the “Lica Heracles” by Antonio Canova, today at the Galleria Nazionale di Arte Moderna also in Rome. It was a mix of museum and reception room with paints and decoration in plaster, mirrors, furniture, silver elements, copies of ancient Greek and Roman sculptures.

== Bibliography ==
- Majanlahti, Anthony, and Amedeo Osti Guerrazzi. Roma divisa 1919-1925: Itinerari, storie, immagini. Il Saggiatore, 2014.
- Carlo Fea. Nuova descrizione di Roma antica e moderna, e de'suoi contorni. 1820.
