= Torlonia Museum =

Roman museum

- Museo Torlonia
- Established: 1859
- Dissolved: 1976
- Location: Rome, Italy
- Type: Sculpture collection
- Collection size: 620
- Founder: Alessandro Torlonia

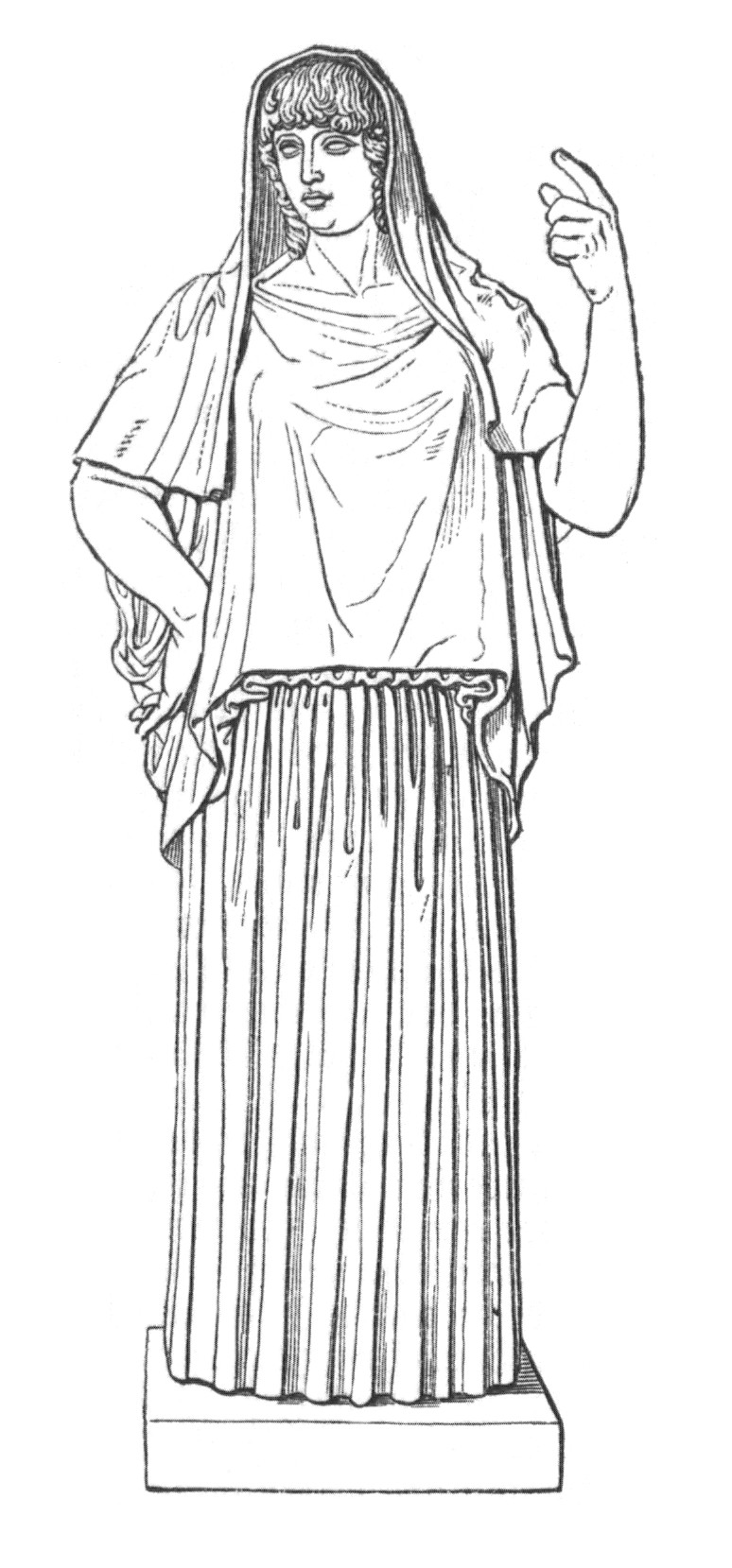
Statue of Hestia Giustiniani (5th century BC), part of the collection

The Torlonia Museum (Italian: Museo Torlonia; not identical with the Villa Torlonia on the Via Nomentana) was a museum in Rome, which housed the Torlonia Collection (Collezione Torlonia) of ancient sculptures.

== History ==
The collection of 620 marble and alabaster statues and sarcophagi dating to the Roman Empire period has been described as the "most important private museum of sculpture in the world" by Italian art critic Federico Zeri and, according to The Daily Telegraph, has been "said to rival [the ancient sculptures] of the Vatican." The Encyclopædia Britannica considers the most significant of the works a relief of Heracles freeing Theseus and Peirithoos (4th century BC, attributed to the school of Phidias) and a sculpture of "Hestia Giustiniani" (5th century BC, attributed to Kalamis). Overall, the collection contains 20 statues of Hercules, about 30 of Venus, and 100 of the Caesars and their families, among them a bust of Julius Caesar. Besides, it includes sculptures of the gods from Roman mythology and Roman copies of Greek statues.

According to newspaper The Daily Telegraph, the namesake of the collection and then the museum, the Roman Torlonia family, received ownership of the collection around 1800 or in the early 19th century. The previous owners, the Giustiniani family, had taken out a loan from the Torlonia dynasty and secured it with the collection, but then defaulted on paying back the loan. (According to earlier information by the same newspaper, however, Prince Giovanni Torlonia himself was the founder of the collection when, in 1810, "he bought some works and unearthed others on his land in Portus".)

Alessandro Torlonia, heir to Giovanni, opened the collection to visitors in their family palace on Via della Lungara, close to the Tiber River, in 1893. In the 1960s, the museum was dismantled and the 77-room palace was illegally converted into a 93-unit apartment building. The collection was put into storage and was not publicly displayed. In May 2005 the government attempted to buy the collection for 1.2 billion but the offer was declined.

The family put the sculptures into a trust in 2014. After an agreement was reached with the government in 2016, the site of the museum became a restoration and conservation center for the still private collection, but which the family now allows to tour nationally and internationally.
