= Villa Torlonia, Rome =

Villa and gardens in Rome, Italy

Villa Torlonia
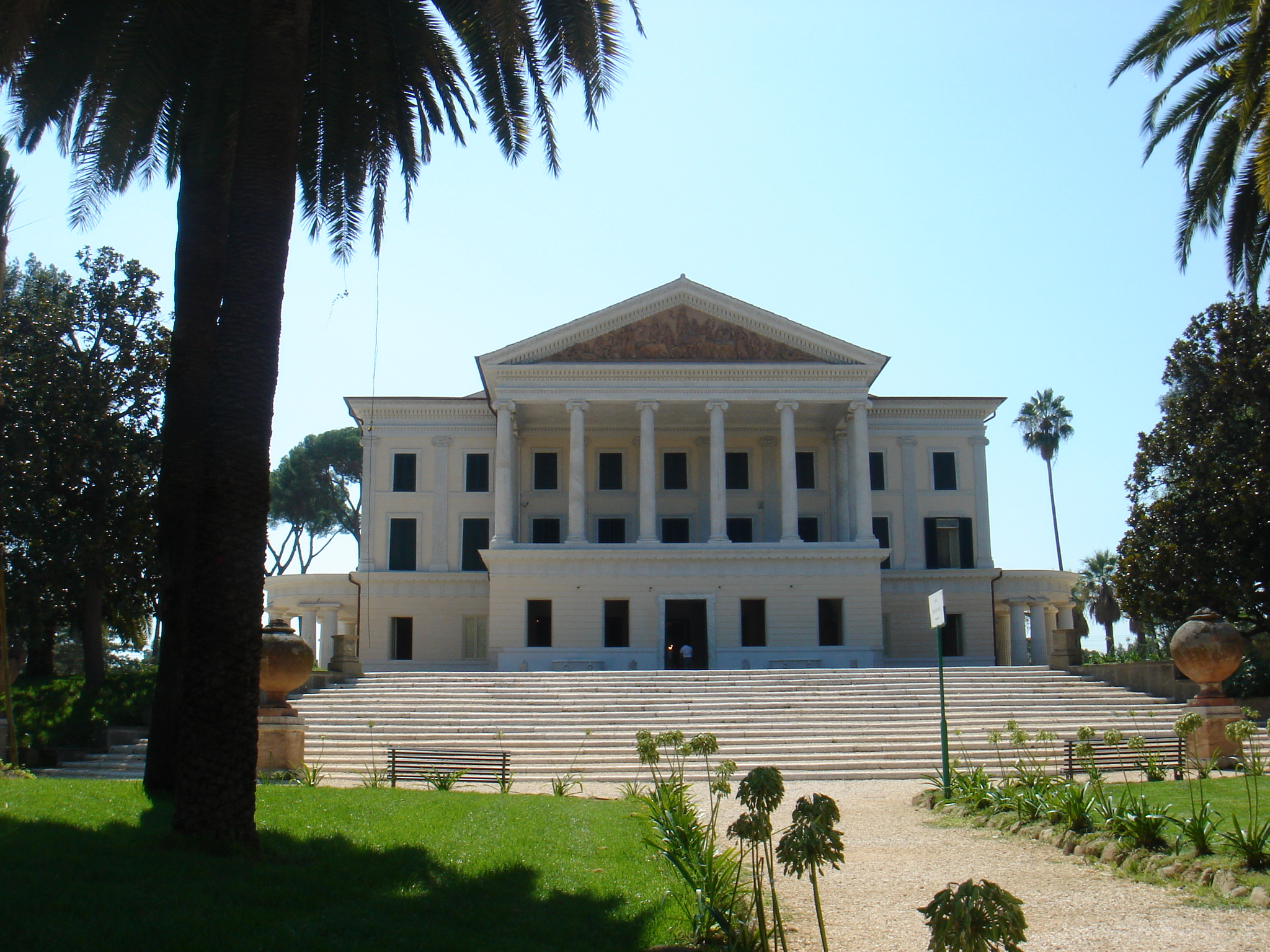
- Villa Torlonia
- Click on the map for a fullscreen view

General information
- Location: Rome, Italy
- Coordinates: 41°54′57″N 12°30′41″E

Design and construction
- Architect: Giuseppe Valadier

Website
- museivillatorlonia.it

Villa Torlonia is a villa and surrounding gardens in Rome, Italy, formerly belonging to the Torlonia family. It is entered from the via Nomentana.

== Design ==
It was designed by the Neoclassical architect Giuseppe Valadier. Construction began in 1806 for the banker Giovanni Torlonia (1756–1829) and was finished by his son Alessandro (1800–1880).

== History ==
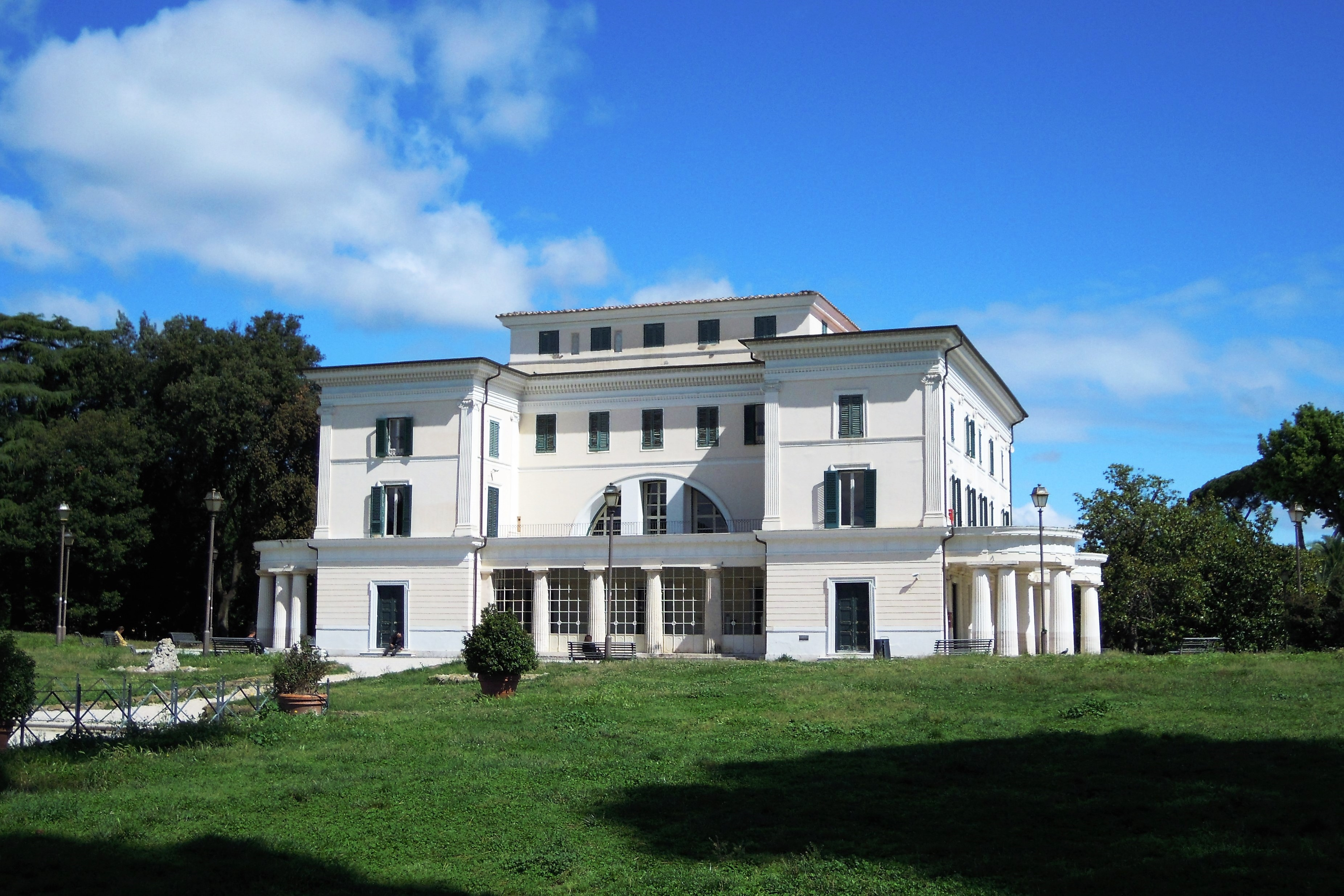
Villa Torlonia, the rear facade

Mussolini rented it from the Torlonia for one lira a year to use as his state residence from the 1920s onwards. He and his family lived there for the next 18 years. It was abandoned after 1945, and allowed to decay in the following decades, but recent restoration work has allowed it to be opened to the public as a museum owned and operated by Rome's municipality.

== Buildings and grounds ==
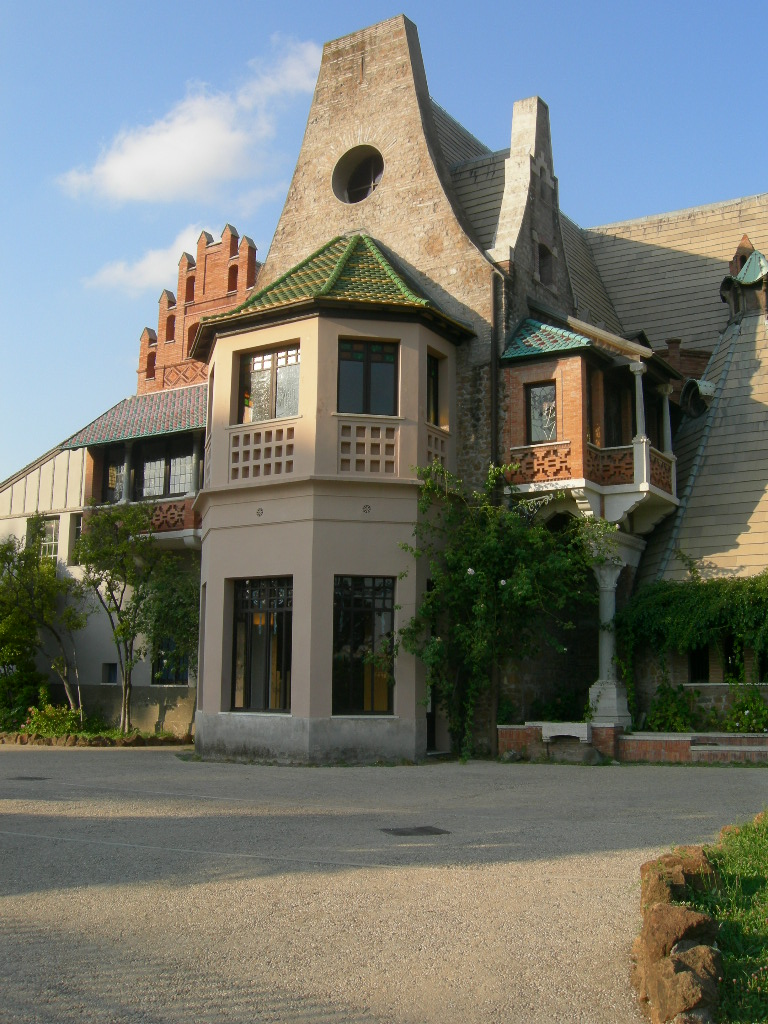
Casina delle Civette

Between 1802 and 1806 Valadier turned the main building into a palace, and transformed other buildings. He also laid out the park with symmetrical avenues around the palace. Numerous works of classical art, many of which were sculptures, were purchased to furnish the palace. Following the death of Giovanni, Alessandro commissioned the painter and architect Giovan Battisti Caretti in 1832 to further develop the property. In addition to expanding the buildings, Caretti constructed several buildings in the park. These included the False Ruins, the Temple of Saturn, and the Tribuna con Fontana.

To plan and carry out other works, Alessandro employed Quintiliano Raimondi for the theatre and orangerie (today known as the "Lemon-house"), and Giuseppe Jappelli, who was in charge of the entire south section of the grounds, which he transformed with avenues, small lakes, exotic plants and unusual buildings. These included the Swiss Hut (later rebuilt as the Casina delle Civette), the Conservatory, the Tower and Moorish Grotto, and the Tournament Field. The project culminated in 1842 with the erection of two pink granite obelisks that commemorated Alessandro's parents.

In 1919 a large underground 3rd- and 4th-century Jewish catacomb was discovered in the north-west area of the grounds. There are about 3,800 graves in the cemetery. It is still not open to the public because the excavation of the catacomb has been questioned by many due to a Jewish religious law that states that all human bodies must remain buried at all times. In 1925 the Villa was given to Mussolini as a residence, where he remained until 1943, with few changes to the aboveground structures.

Underground, an air-raid shelter was first constructed in the garden of the villa, and then, in a second stage of building, a much larger and more complex airtight bunker was constructed under the villa itself, with the intention of resisting both aerial bombardment and chemical warfare.

In June 1944 the property was all occupied by the Allied High Command, which remained there until 1947. The Villa was bought by the Municipality of Rome in 1977 and a year later it was opened to the public, but with many of the buildings in a run-down state. Restoration was initiated in the 1990s, and has been largely completed with the exception of the Moorish Conservatory (Serra Moresca), although there is an ongoing restoration of the villa. The landscaped grounds are in the English 'picturesque' style.

== The museum ==
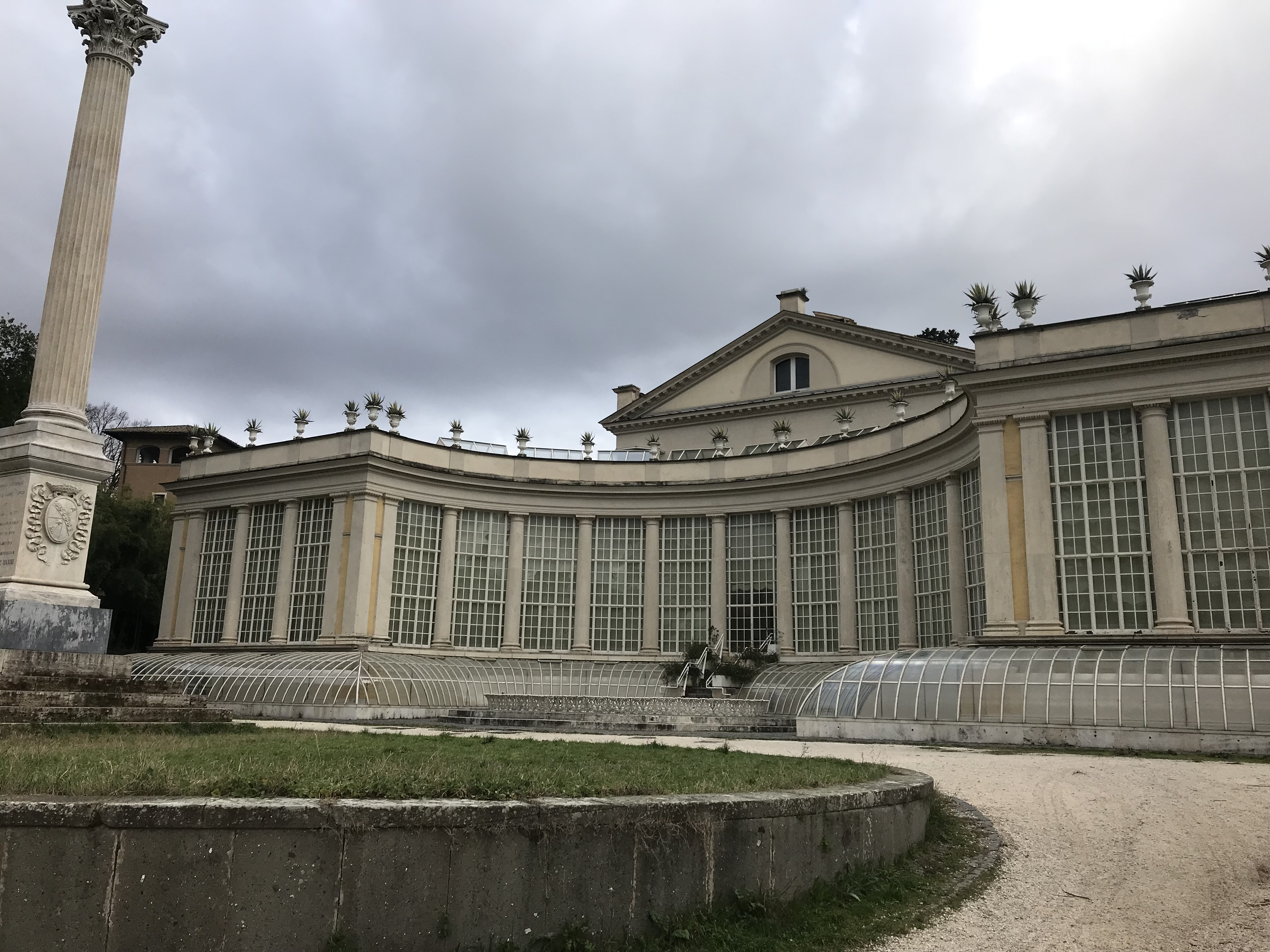
Teatro Villa Torlonia in January 2019

The museum in the villa contains a small collection of pieces of statuary from the Torlonia collection found in the villa and several pieces found in the gardens. Giovanni and Alessandro were for almost a century leading figures in the field of art collecting. The works exhibited were in part produced by Bartolomeo Cavaceppi (1716–1799), an eighteenth-century sculptor, restorer and antiques dealer, following Giovanni's purchase in 1800 of all the works in Cavaceppi's studio.

Other exhibits come from other Torlonia properties and include pieces of the villa's furniture that managed to survive the years of neglect. Other exhibits include three plaster reliefs by Antonio Canova, a woman's head in the style of Michelangelo, several pieces of furniture, and a marble pediment taken from a tomb on the Appian Way. All of these were discovered in the basement of the theatre in the gardens. A final section of the museum is the reconstructed Bedchamber of Giovanni Torlonia (1872–1938), with the pieces of furniture that were used by Benito Mussolini during the period he resided in the villa.

== Casina delle Civette ==
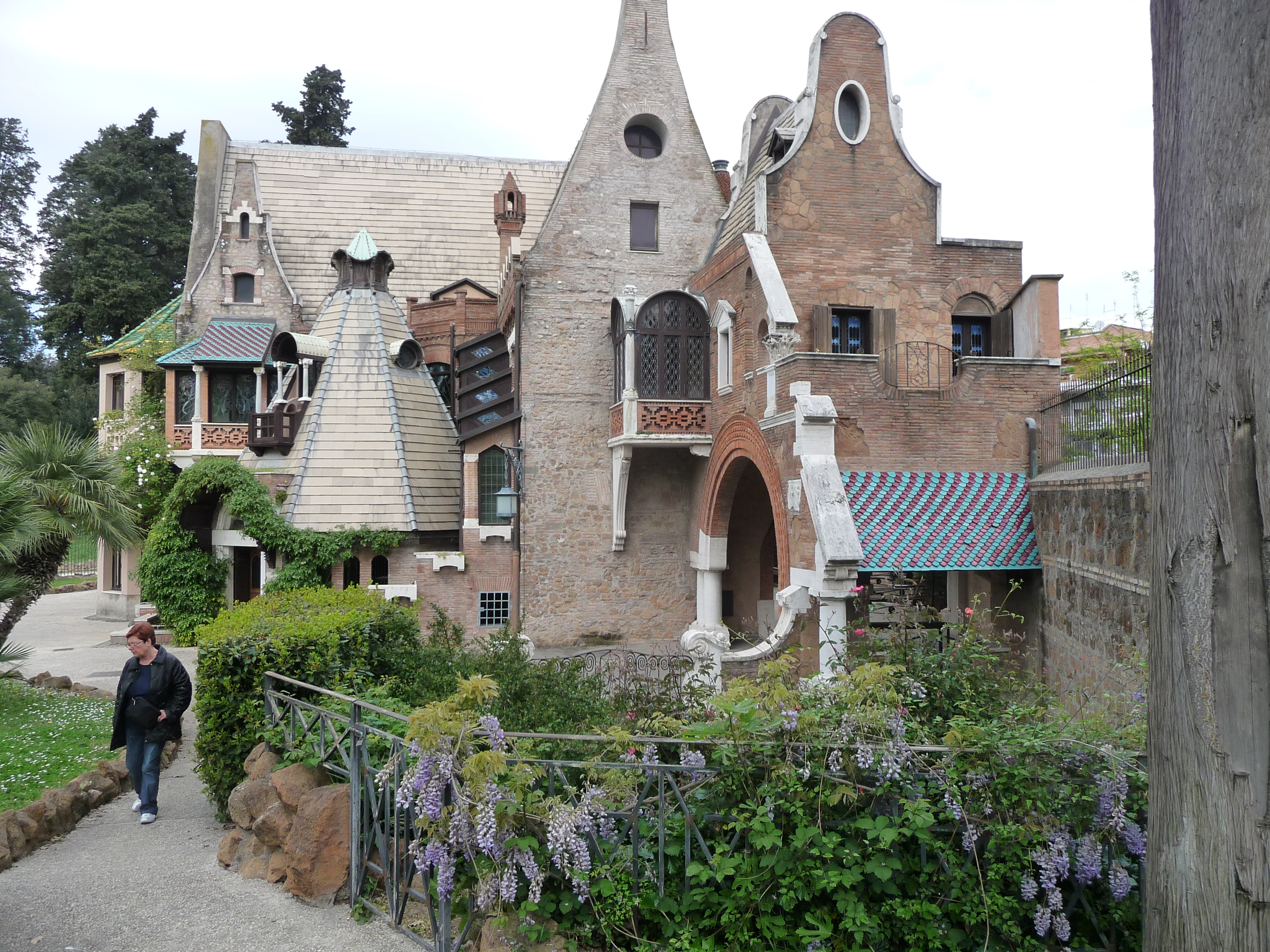
Casina delle Civette

The Casina delle Civette (Small House of the Little Owls) results from a series of additions to the nineteenth-century "Swiss Cabin", which was originally intended as a refuge from the formality of the main residence. It was designed in 1840 by Jappelli. The outside of the house was faced with blocks of tufa, while the inside was painted in tempera. The complex now consists of two buildings, the main house and the annexe, connected by a small wooden gallery and an underground passage. These buildings bear little resemblance to the original. In 1908, architect Enrico Gennari began to convert the small building into a residence with huge windows, loggias, porticos and turrets, decorated with majolica and stained glass.

From 1916 the building began to be known as the "House of the Little Owls", probably because the motif of the little owl is used widely in the decorations and furnishings. The Casina delle Civette can be visited as part of the museum. The twenty rooms include 54 pieces of stained glass replaced, after restoration, in their original positions, 18 pieces of stained glass acquired and displayed on separate frames, and 105 sketches and preparatory cartoons for stained glass.

== The theatre ==
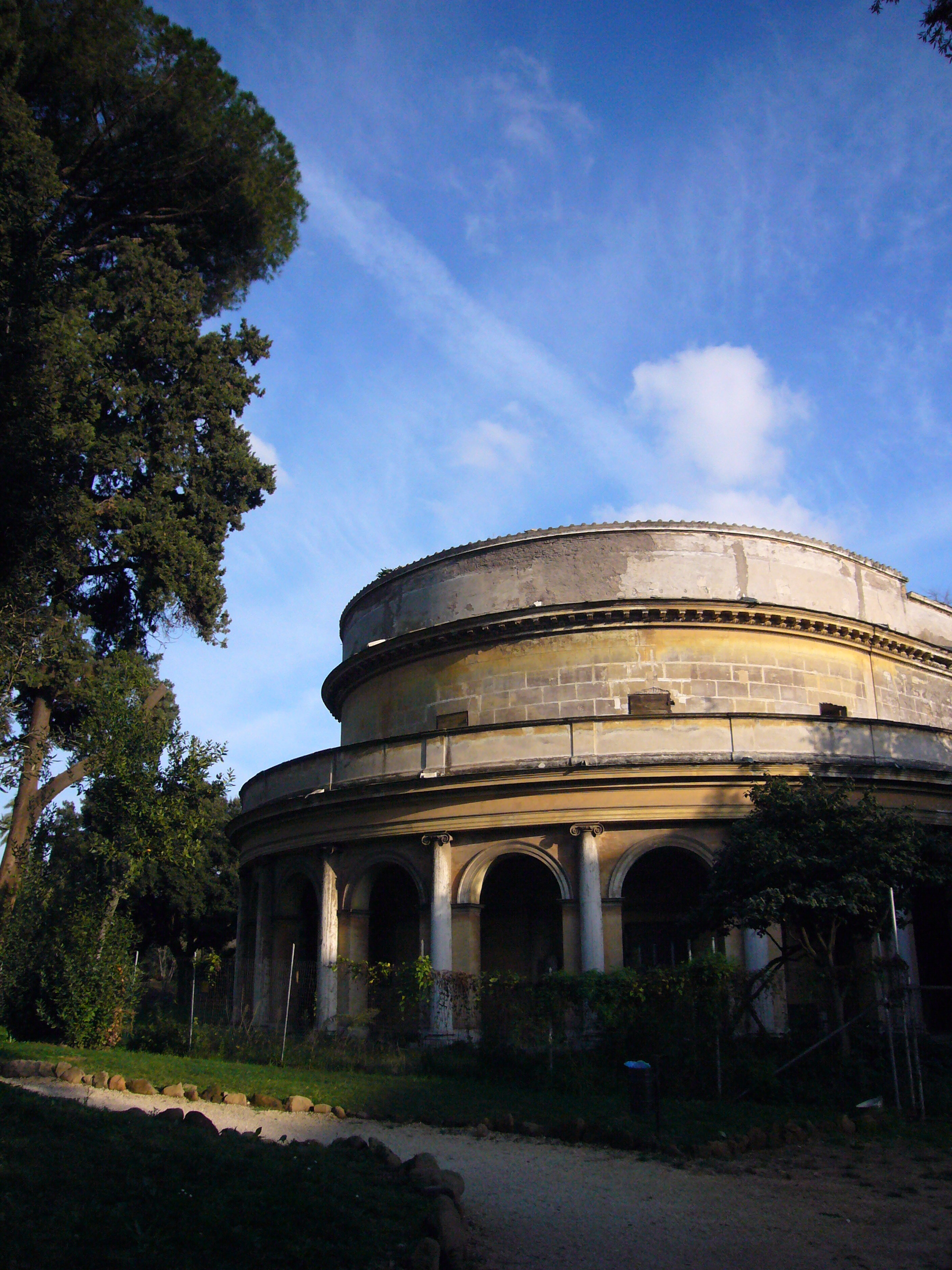
Rear of the theatre prior to renovation

Alessandro Torlonia commissioned Teatro Villa Torlonia in 1841, and it was completed in 1873. The building was constructed under the guidance of architect Quintiliano Raimondi. The interior of the building was decorated by Constantino Brumidi. It sustained damage after the war during the allied occupation, and remained derelict until it was restored and reopened in 2013. Before the Covid-19 pandemic beginning in early 2020, the theatre hosted occasional public performances.

== See also ==
- List of parks and gardens in Rome
- Villa Albani (also known as Villa Albani-Torlonia)

Preceded by Villa Medici	Landmarks of Rome; Villa Torlonia, Rome	Succeeded by Parco degli Acquedotti
