= Poli =

Poli can refer to:

== Food ==
- A Marathi name for chapati, an Indian flatbread made up of wheat flour
  - Puran poli, an Indian sweet dish, a poli made up of wheat flour and puran (sweet cooked gram paste)

== Organisations ==
- FC Politehnica Timișoara, Romanian first league football club
- FC Politehnica Iasi, Romanian first league football club
- A shortname of the Instituto Politécnico Superior (Rosario)
- A shortname for the Instituto Politécnico Nacional (National Polytechnic Institute), the second largest university in Mexico
- POLi Payments, an online payment service direct from consumer bank accounts in UK, Australia, New Zealand, and South Africa

== People ==
- Poli (given name), people named Poli
- Poli (surname), people surnamed Poli
- Poli (footballer) (Hipólito Fernández Serrano, born 1977), Spanish footballer who currently plays for Recreativo de Huelva

== Places ==
- Poli, Cameroon
- Poli, Jiaonan (泊里镇), town in Jiaonan, Shandong, China
- Poli, Andika, a village in Khuzestan Province, Iran
- Poli, Lali, a village in Khuzestan Province, Iran
- Poli, Lazio, Italy
- Poli, the plural form of polis
- Shortened version of Kōnstantinoúpolis (Constantinople), the medieval name of Istanbul
- Poli (Tanzanian ward), a ward in Tanzania
- Poli's Palace Theater, a movie picture palace built in 1922 by Sylvester Z. Poli in Waterbury, Connecticut
- Poli, an old name for a kingdom on the island of Sumatra, possibly Pedir kingdom

== Other uses ==
- POLI, human gene
- Don Poli (foaled 21 April 2009), Irish thoroughbred racehorse
- Short for Politics or political science
- Robocar Poli, a 2011 South Korean cartoon
