= Marco Torlonia, 6th Prince of Civitella-Cesi =

Marco Torlonia
- Prince of Civitella-Cesi
- Born: 2 July 1937; Italy
- Died: 5 December 2014 (aged 77); Italy
- Spouse: Donna Orsetta Caracciolo (m. 1960; died 1968) Philippa Catherine McDonald (m. 1968; div. 1975) Blažena Anna Helena Svitáková (m. 1975)
- Issue: Don Giovanni Torlonia, 7th Prince of Civitella-Cesi; Donna Vittoria Eugenia Colonna; Donna Caterina d'Albora
Names
- Marco Alfonso Torlonia
- House: Torlonia
- Father: Don Alessandro Torlonia, 5th Prince of Civitella-Cesi
- Mother: Infanta Beatriz of Spain

Don Marco Alfonso Torlonia, 6th Prince of Civitella-Cesi (2 July 1937 – 5 December 2014) was the son of Alessandro Torlonia, 5th Prince of Civitella-Cesi and Infanta Beatriz of Spain, daughter of King Alfonso XIII of Spain. He was, therefore, the first cousin to King Juan Carlos I of Spain. He was also an uncle to Princess Sibilla of Luxembourg, daughter of his younger sister, Olimpia.

== Marriage and issue ==
He married firstly Donna Orsetta Caracciolo, dei Duchi di Melito dei Principi di Castagneto (17 May 1940 – 10 March 1968) on 16 September 1960 (marriage dissolved by her death in 1968). They have one son and two grandchildren:

- Giovanni Torlonia, 7th Prince of Civitella-Cesi (18 April 1962), who married Carla DeStefanis (23 November 1966) on 9 June 2001, with issue:
  - Don Stanislao de Civitella-Cesi (January 2005)
  - Donna Olimpia de Civitella-Cesi (3 March 2008)

He married secondly Philippa McDonald on 9 November 1968 (marriage dissolved by divorce in 1975). They have one daughter:

- Donna Vittoria Eugenia Carolina Honor Paola Alexandra Maria Torlonia (8 May 1971), who married Kenneth Lindsay on 20 December 1997 and they were divorced. They have two children. She remarried to Stefano Colonna and they have one daughter.
  - Josephine Lindsay (1998)
  - Benedict Lindsay (2001)
  - Francesca Colonna (2008)

He married thirdly Blažena Svitáková on 11 November 1985. They have one daughter and two grandsons:

- Donna Catarina Agnese Torlonia (14 June 1974), who married Stefano d’Albora on 28 July 2000, with issue:
  - Gianpaolo d'Albora (2002)
  - Gianmarco d'Albora (2003)

== Ancestry ==
Ancestors of Marco Torlonia, 6th Prince of Civitella-Cesi

8. Don Giulio Torlonia, 2nd Duke of Poli and Guadagnolo
4. Don Marino Torlonia, 4th Prince of Civitella-Cesi
9. Donna Teresa Chigi della Rovere-Albani
2. Don Alessandro Torlonia, 5th Prince of Civitella-Cesi
10. Charles Arthur Moore
5. Mary Elsie Moore
11. Mary Campbell
1. Don Marco Torlonia, 6th Prince of Civitella-Cesi
12. Alfonso XII of Spain
6. Alfonso XIII of Spain
13. Archiduchess Maria Christina of Austria
3. Infanta Beatriz of Spain
14. Prince Henry of Battenberg
7. Princess Victoria Eugenie of Battenberg
15. Princess Beatrice of the United Kingdom
