= Torlonia =

Italian princely family from Rome

- Country: Italy
- Place of origin: France
- Founder: Marino Torlonia
- Historic seat: Villa Torlonia
- Estates: Palazzo Núñez-Torlonia; Palazzo Torlonia; Villa Albani

The House of Torlonia, the Princes of Civitella-Cesi, is the name of an Italian princely family from Rome, which acquired a huge fortune in the 18th and 19th centuries through administering the finances of the Vatican. The first influential member of the Torlonia family was Marino Torlonia (Tourlonias; 1725 – 21 March 1785), who rose from humble origins in the Auvergne region of France to become a very rich businessman and banker in Rome.

== History ==
Marino was born with the French name of Marin Torlonias, the son of Antoine Torlonias, a merchant and laborer. Marin's great-uncle was the parish priest of Augerolles, who procured for him a position as aide to an influential abbot. Marin eventually settled in Rome, where he became a cloth merchant and money lender near the Piazza of the Trinità dei Monti. This became the foundation of the family bank established by his son, Giovanni Torlonia.

Giovanni, in return for his able administration of the Vatican finances, was created duke of Bracciano and count of Pisciarelli by Pope Pius VI in 1794. In 1803, Pius VII made him marquess of Romavecchia e Turrita and the first prince of Civitella Cesi. He was made, among other titles, a Roman Patrician in 1809, with confirmation from the Pope on 19 January 1813, and the duke of Poli e Guadagnolo in 1820. He was the builder of the Villa Torlonia in Rome, among other Palazzo Torlonia villas. He married Anna Maria Chiaveri née Schultheiss, a widow who came from a family of southern German merchants in Donaueschingen.

Leopoldo Torlonia, a grandson of Giovanni, was the Mayor of Rome from May 1882 to May 1887.

His great-grandson, Marino Torlonia succeeded to the title as 4th prínce of Civitella-Cesi, a title he inherited from Augusto, his older brother, in 1926. The title had been passed to Augusto from their paternal great-uncle, Alessandro, younger brother of Augusto's and Marino's grandfather, Giulio. Marino married the rich American heiress Mary Elsie Moore; they were the parents of Don Alessandro Torlonia, 5th Prince di Civitella-Cesi, who married the Infanta Beatriz of Spain, the daughter of King Alfonso XIII - one of their grandchildren is Princess Sibilla of Luxembourg; and of Donna Marina Torlonia di Civitella-Cesi, the wife of American tennis player Francis Xavier Shields and grandmother of the American actress Brooke Shields.

In Rome, the Torlonia properties comprise: Palazzo Torlonia-Giraud in Via della Conciliazione (rione of Borgo), Palazzo Núñez-Torlonia in Via Condotti, near the Spanish Steps, Palazzo Torlonia in Via della Lungara (rione of Trastevere) and Villa Torlonia (Villa Albani) outside Porta Salaria. They also owned the now demolished Palazzo Torlonia-Bolognetti near Piazza Venezia.

The Torlonia family were one of the few Italian aristocratic families to have survived the reconstruction of the Papal Court in 1969 by the motu proprio Pontificalis Domus. Until recently the only hereditary honours still in use at the Vatican are that of hereditary Prince Assistants to the Papal Throne. This honour was until recently held by Prince Alessandro Torlonia, Prince of Fucino, and Prince Marcantonio Colonna, Prince and Duke of Paliano. The Torlonia family was appointed in 1958 (its title dates from 1854 also), in succession to Prince Filippo Orsini, whose family had held the position since 1735.

A poem quoted by Ignazio Silone in his novel "Fontamara" (1930), at the height of their power translates as:

The head of everything is God, the Lord of heaven
After Him comes Prince Torlonia, lord of the earth
Then comes Prince Torlonia's armed guards
Then comes Prince Torlonia's armed guards dogs
Then comes nothing at all. Then comes nothing at all.
Then comes nothing at all.
Then come the peasants. And that's all.

== Lineage ==
- Marino Torlonia (1725–1785)
  - Giovanni Torlonia, 1st Prince of Civitella-Cesi (1755–1829)
    - Marino Torlonia (1796–1860)
      - Giulio Torlonia (1824–1871)
        - Leopoldo Torlonia (1853–1918)
        - Augusto Torlonia, 3rd Prince of Civitella Cesi (1855–1926)
        - Marino Torlonia, 4th Prince of Civitella-Cesi (1861–1933)
          - Alessandro Torlonia, 5th Prince of Civitella-Cesi (1911–1986)
            - Marco Torlonia, 6th Prince of Civitella-Cesi (1937–2014)
              - Giovanni Torlonia, 7th Prince of Civitella-Cesi (born 1962)
          - Marina Torlonia di Civitella-Cesi (1916–1960)
    - Alessandro Torlonia, 2nd Prince of Civitella-Cesi (1800–1886)

== Sources ==
- Ponchon, Henri (2005). L'Incroyable Saga des Torlonia: des monts du Forez aux palais romains. Olliergues: Les Éditions de la Montmarie. ISBN 2-915841-08-X.
- Paul Theroff's Online Gotha.
- Rendina, Claudio (2004). Le grandi famiglie di Roma. Rome: Newton Compton.
