= Palazzo Torlonia (disambiguation) =

Palazzo Torlonia (or Giraud) at via della Conciliazione is the name of palace in Rome, Italy, which was owned by the family of the princes Torlonia.

Palazzo Torlonia may also refer to:

- Palazzo Torlonia-Bolognetti, at Piazza Venezia (demolished).
- Palazzo Núñez-Torlonia at Via Bocca di Leone near the Spanish Steps.
- Palazzo Torlonia at Via della Lungara, Rione Trastevere.
- The Villa Torlonia at Via Nomentana.
