= Marina Torlonia di Civitella-Cesi =

20th-century Italian socialite (1916–1960)

Her Royal Highness Marina Torlonia
- Other names: Donna Torlonia, Marina Torlonia Shields, Marina Torlonia Slater
- Born: 22 October 1916; Palazzo Núñez-Torlonia, Rome, Italy
- Died: 15 September 1960 (aged 43); Piacenza, Italy
- Noble family: House of Torlonia
- Spouses: Frank Shields (m. 1940; div. 1950) Edward W. Slater (m. 1950)
- Issue: 3, including Francis Alexander Shields
- Father: Marino Torlonia, 4th Prince of Civitella-Cesi
- Mother: Mary Elsie Moore

Donna Marina Torlonia dei Principi di Civitella-Cesi (22 October 1916 – 15 September 1960), also known as Princess Marina Torlonia Shields and Princess Marina Torlonia Slater, was an Italian-American aristocrat and charity worker.

== Family ==
Coat of arms of the House of Torlonia

Torlonia was born in Rome, at Palazzo Núñez-Torlonia, the youngest daughter of Marino Torlonia, 4th Prince of Civitella-Cesi and his American wife, Mary Elsie Moore, a daughter of Charles Arthur Moore, a hardware merchant from Connecticut. The Torlonia family gained its fortune in the administration of Vatican finances.

She had three siblings:

- Donna Princess Olimpia Torlonia dei Principi di Civitella-Cesi (1909–1924)
- Don Alessandro Torlonia, 5th Prince of Civitella-Cesi (1911–1986), the husband of Infanta Beatriz of Spain (1909–2002, daughter of King Alphonso XIII).
- Donna Princess Cristina Torlonia dei Principi di Civitella-Cesi (1913–1974)

== Political and charity work ==
In February 1934, Torlonia made her New York City debut. Torlonia enjoyed going to nightclubs and undertaking Democratic Party-related charity work. In 1934 she led many charity fundraising efforts. Some of the charity fundraisers she was involved with include the American Auxiliary Hospital in Mougins, France, the Italian Welfare League, New York City Cancer Institute, the New York Diet Kitchen Association, the Babies Hospital of the City of New York, Soldiers and Sailors Club of New York, New York Exchange for Woman's Work, Woman's Auxiliary of the Osteopathic Clinic of New York, Goddard Neighborhood Centre, Children's Village at Dobbs Ferry, New York, among others.

In 1936 Torlonia was dressed as "wealth" with a tall headdress and two hand maids at one of a nationwide set of birthday celebrations for President Roosevelt. The following year in 1937 at the Roosevelt Birthday Ball Torlonia was one of a hundred women specially dressed to celebrate the event, she was dressed as "The East", representing the Eastern United States fashion, and in attendance was the President's mother Sara Roosevelt.

Sculptor Marino Marini created a wax portrait of Marina Torlonia in 1935.

== Marriages ==
Donna Marina Torlonia dei Principi di Civitella-Cesi was married twice, her husbands being:

- Francis Xavier Shields (1909–1975), the American amateur tennis player. They married on 13 June 1940, in North Conway, New Hampshire, and divorced in 1950. The Shieldses had two children: a son, Francis Alexander Shields and a daughter, Marina Shields.
- Edward W. Slater, an architect and partner at architectural firm Slater and Chiat, whom she married on 29 December 1950. They had one son, Edward Torlonia Slater (born 1955).

Torlonia was the paternal grandmother of American actress Brooke Shields, the daughter of her son Francis Alexander Shields.

== Death ==
Torlonia died on 15 September 1960, in an automobile accident in Piacenza, Italy, shortly after leaving the wedding of her nephew Marco Torlonia, 6th Prince of Civitella-Cesi, to princess Orsetta Caracciolo, niece of film director Luchino Visconti. Duke Raffaele Canevaro di Zoagli and his mother-in-law, Eleanor Terry, were also killed in the accident.

== Ancestry ==
Ancestors of Marina Torlonia di Civitella-Cesi

8. Marino Torlonia, Duke di Bracciano e Poli e Guadagnolo
4. Giulio Torlonia, 2nd Duke di Poli e Guadagnolo
9. Donna Anna Sforza-Cesarini
2. Marino Torlonia, 4th Prince of Civitella-Cesi
10. Sigismondo Chigi della Rovere Albani, Prince di Farnese
5. Donna Teresa Chigi della Rovere Albani
11. Donna Leopoldina Doria-Pamphilj-Landi
1. Donna Marina Torlonia di Civitella-Cesi
12. William Ropes Moore
6. Charles Arthur Moore
13. Caroline Van Ness
3. Mary Elsie Moore
14. John Keyes Campbell
7. Mary Campbell
15. Betsey Sheffield
