= Leopoldo Torlonia =

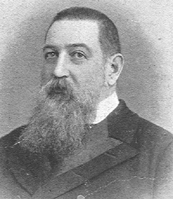
Leopoldo Torlonia.

Leopoldo Torlonia (25 July 1853—23 October 1918) was an Italian nobleman and politician, who was Mayor of Rome from May 1882 to May 1887.

He was the third duke of Poli and of Guadagnolo.. He was brother of Marino Torlonia, 4th Prince of Civitella-Cesi and uncle of Alessandro Torlonia, 5th Prince of Civitella-Cesi (son-in-law of King Alfonso XIII of Spain).

He was dismissed from office in 1887 by then Prime Minister Francesco Crispi for congratulating Pope Leo XIII on his Jubilee.

Preceded by Luigi Pianciani	Mayor of Rome; 1882–1887	Succeeded by Alessandro Guiccioli
