= Frank Shields =

Amateur American tennis player

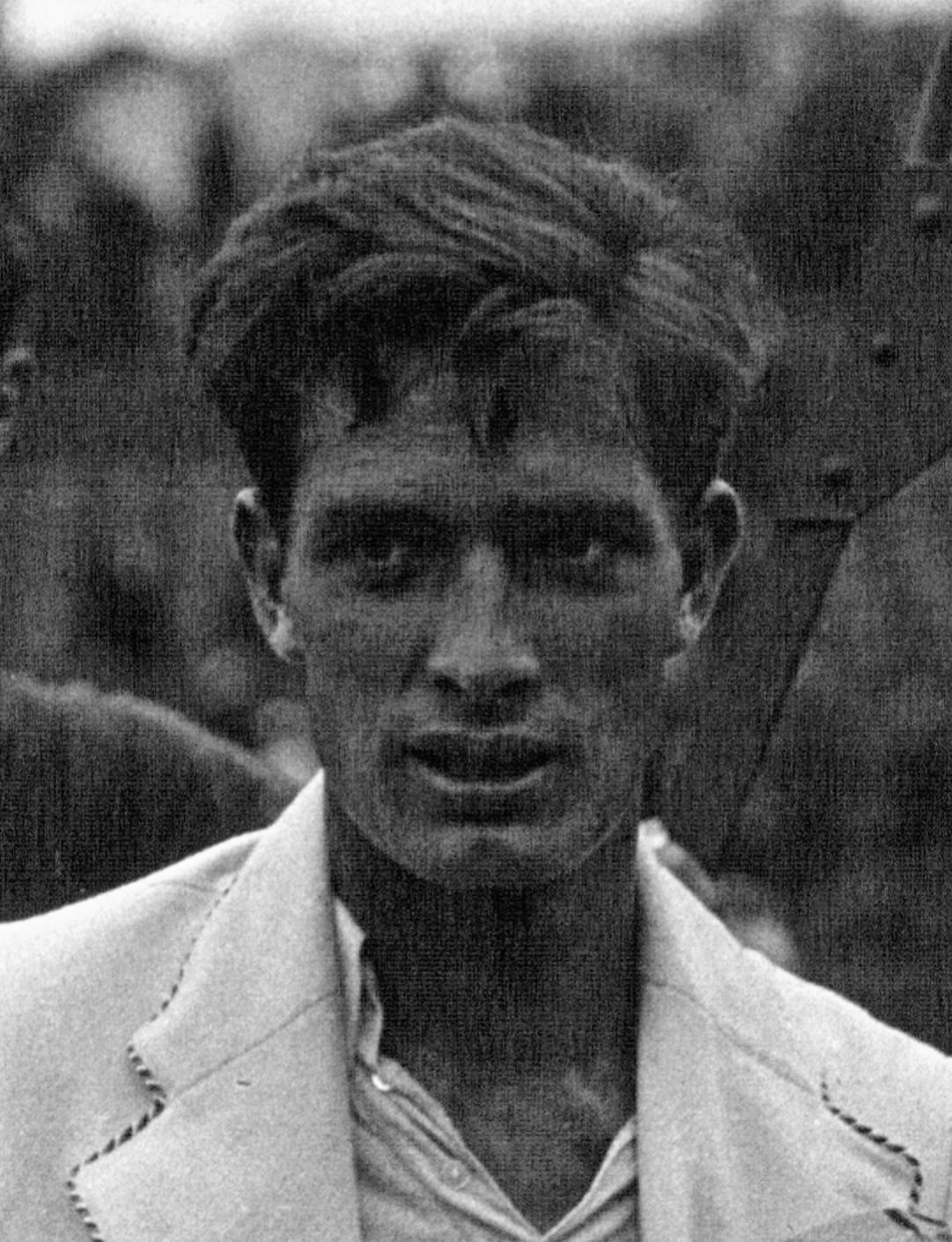
- Full name: Francis Xavier Alexander Shields Sr.
- Country (sports): United States
- Born: November 18, 1909 New York City, U.S.
- Died: August 19, 1975 (aged 65) New York, U.S.
- Turned pro: 1926 (amateur tour)
- Retired: 1955
- Plays: Right-handed (1-handed backhand)
- Int. Tennis HoF: 1964 (member page)

Singles
- Career record: 214–114
- Career titles: 31
- Highest ranking: No. 2 (1931)

Grand Slam singles results
- French Open: 4R (1933)
- Wimbledon: F (1931)
- US Open: F (1930)

Grand Slam doubles results
- Wimbledon: SF (1931)
- US Open: F (1933)

Grand Slam mixed doubles results
- US Open: F (1930)

Team competitions
- Davis Cup: F (1932)

Francis Xavier Alexander Shields Sr. (November 18, 1909 – August 19, 1975) was an American amateur tennis player of the 1920s and 1930s, and an actor known for Hoosier Schoolboy (1937). He was ranked world No. 2 in 1931, and U.S. No. 1 in 1933.

== Tennis career ==
Noel Dickson in the Melbourne Herald ranked him world No. 2 in 1931, and world No. 5 in 1930 by A. Wallis Myers of The Daily Telegraph. Between 1928 and 1945, the USLTA ranked him eight times in the U.S. Top Ten, reaching No. 1 in 1933, and No. 2 in 1930.

In January 1928, Shields was runner-up to George Lott in the Canadian Covered Courts Championships at the Montreal Indoor Tennis Club, defeating Canadian No. 1 Dr. Jack Wright in a long five-set semifinal.

Shields was runner-up in the 1929 Canadian Open Championships at the Toronto Lawn Tennis Club on red clay, losing the final to Dr. Wright, who had earlier beaten John Doeg in the semifinal. Shields lost to Bill Tilden in the third round of the 1929 U.S. National Tennis Championships, but returned the favor the following season, defeating Tilden in the quarterfinals of the 1930 Southampton Invitation.

In June, 1930, Shields won the singles title at the Cincinnati Open, defeating Paul Kunkel in the semifinals and Emmett Paré in the final in five sets.

Shields defeated Wilmer Allison and Sidney Wood before losing to John Doeg in the final of the 1930 U.S. Championships. Shields defaulted to Sidney Wood in the singles final of Wimbledon in 1931 due to an ankle injury he had sustained in winning his semi-final match against France's "Musketeer" Jean Borotra, and this was the only time in the history of a Grand Slam event the singles final of that event was won by default.

His best season was 1933, when he won nine tournaments. He won the Canadian Covered Court Championships title in January, defeating J. Gilbert Hall in the final. Shields reached the fourth round at the 1933 French Championships at Roland Garros, where he lost to Christian Boussus. He did not play at Wimbledon that season. During the Wimbledon period, Shields played in the Eastern Clay Court Championships in Jackson Heights, Queens, N.Y., finishing runner-up to J. Gilbert Hall in the final. He also won the Southampton Invitation (Long Island) on grass, defeating Bitsy Grant in the semifinal and Frank Parker in the final, in three straight sets. Shields won the Newport Casino Invitational on grass, defeating Ellsworth Vines in the semifinal and Wilmer Allison in the final. At the Mason & Dixon Championships at The Greenbrier resort, Shields defeated Gregory Mangin in the final in four sets.

At the 1933 U.S. Championships, Shields was seeded No. 2 behind Vines. Vines lost to Grant in the fourth round, while Shields reached the semifinal, where he lost to Jack Crawford. Shields was ranked U.S. No. 1 for 1933 by the USLTA official ranking, and world No. 5 ahead of Vines by Bernard Brown.

In 1934, Shields defended his Canadian Covered Court Championships title by defeating J. Gilbert Hall in a close four-set semifinal and George Lott in the final in three straight sets. He won the United North and South tournament at the prestigious Pinehurst Country Club, North Carolina on clay courts, defeating Allison in the final in three long, straight sets. Shields defended his Mason & Dixon title at The Greenbrier resort by defeating Grant in a close five-set match in the final. Shields reached the final of the Queen's Club Championships, where he lost to Sidney Wood. He reached the semifinal at Wimbledon, where he lost a close match to Crawford.

In 1935, Shields won the Ojai Tennis Tournament, defeating Gene Mako in the final. In 1937, he won the Hotel de Coronado tournament in San Diego, defeating Jack Tidball in the final.

He entered the 1950 US Open. However, he and Ginger Rogers were knocked out of the mixed doubles competition in the first round. He competed at the 1951 U.S. National Championships in New York City, but was defeated in the first round by South African Syd Levy in straight sets.

=== Davis Cup ===
He competed for the Davis Cup in 1931, 1932, and 1934, winning 19 of 25 matches. He was left off the team in 1933, supposedly for "erratic" "playing," despite being the No. 1 ranked U.S. player for that year. Shields was the non-playing captain in 1951, when the team won four matches.

== Personal ==
Shields had his issues both with interactions with other players and with alcohol. In the late 1930s, Shields was known for making fun of the US tennis star Bryan Grant, the smallest American to win an international championship, saying "the little shaver" was hiding behind the net. Once, a drunk Shields held Grant upside down, outside a hotel window.

== Grand Slam finals ==
=== Singles (2 runners-up) ===
Result	Year	Championship	Surface	Opponent	Score
Loss	1930	U.S. Championships	Grass	(United States) John Doeg	8–10, 6–1, 4–6, 14–16
Loss	1931	Wimbledon	Grass	(United States) Sidney Wood	walkover

=== Doubles (1 runner-up) ===
Result	Year	Championship	Surface	Partner	Opponents	Score
Loss	1933	U.S. Championships	Grass	(United States) Frank Parker	(United States) George Lott (United States) Lester Stoefen	13–11, 7–9, 7–9, 3–6

=== Mixed doubles (1 runner-up) ===
Result	Year	Championship	Surface	Partner	Opponents	Score
Loss	1930	U.S. Championships	Grass	(United States) Marjorie Morrill	(United States) Edith Cross (United States) Wilmer Allison	4–6, 4–6

== Marriages ==
In 1932, Shields married Rebecca Tenney (1910–2005). In 1938, he maintained a home in Palm Springs, California. Shields and Tenney divorced in 1940 because of his "habitual intemperance and cruelty" and in 1947, she married lawyer Donald Agnew.

In 1940, he married his second wife, Marina Torlonia di Civitella-Cesi (1916–1960). Marina was the daughter of Marino Torlonia, 4th Prince of Civitella-Cesi (1861–1933) and Mary Elsie Moore (1888–1941), an American heiress. Marina's brother was Alessandro Torlonia, 5th Prince di Civitella-Cesi (1911–1986), the husband of the Spanish Infanta Beatriz de Borbón (1909–2002). Shields had two children with Marina Torlonia:

- Francis Xavier Alexander, Jr. (1941–2003), the father of actress-model Brooke Shields (b. 1965)
- Cristiana Marina Shields (b. 1943)

Shields and Torlonia divorced, and in 1950, she married Edward W. Slater.

In 1949, he married Katharine Mortimer (1923–2003), the daughter of financier Stanley Grafton Mortimer, Sr. and grand-daughter of Richard Mortimer. She had previously been married to Oliver Cadwell Biddle, with whom she had a daughter, Christine Mortimer Biddle, who became a stepdaughter to Shields. Shields had three children with Mortimer:

- Katharine Shields
- William "Willy" Xavier Orin Hunt Shields (1949–2016)
- Alston Shields.

Shields and Mortimer divorced, and in 1962, she married Richard Gillespie Blaine.

== Later life ==
In his later years, he was frequently drunk, at which times he became destructive and bullying with his strength. After two heart attacks and a stroke, he died at 65 of a third heart attack, in a Manhattan taxi. He was the grandfather of Brooke Shields, Morgan Christina Shields, and Holton Joseph Shields.

== Acting career ==
Shields appeared in the following films:

- Murder in the Fleet – 1935 as Lieutenant Arnold
- I Live My Life – 1935 as outer office secretary
- Come and Get It – 1936 – as Tony Schwerke
- Affairs of Cappy Ricks – 1937 – as Waldo Bottomley, Jr.
- Hoosier Schoolboy – 1937 – as Jack Matthews. Jr.
- Dead End – 1937 – as well-dressed man
- The Goldwyn Follies – 1938 – as assistant director

== International Tennis Hall of Fame ==
Shields was inducted into the International Tennis Hall of Fame in Newport, Rhode Island in 1964.

== Career highlights ==
- Cincinnati Open Singles Champion, 1930
- US Open Singles finalist, 1930
- US Open Mixed doubles finalist, 1930
- Wimbledon Singles finalist, 1931
- US Open Doubles finalist, 1933
- United States Davis Cup team member 1931–32, 1934
