= Palazzo Núñez-Torlonia =

Palazzo Nuñez-Torlonia
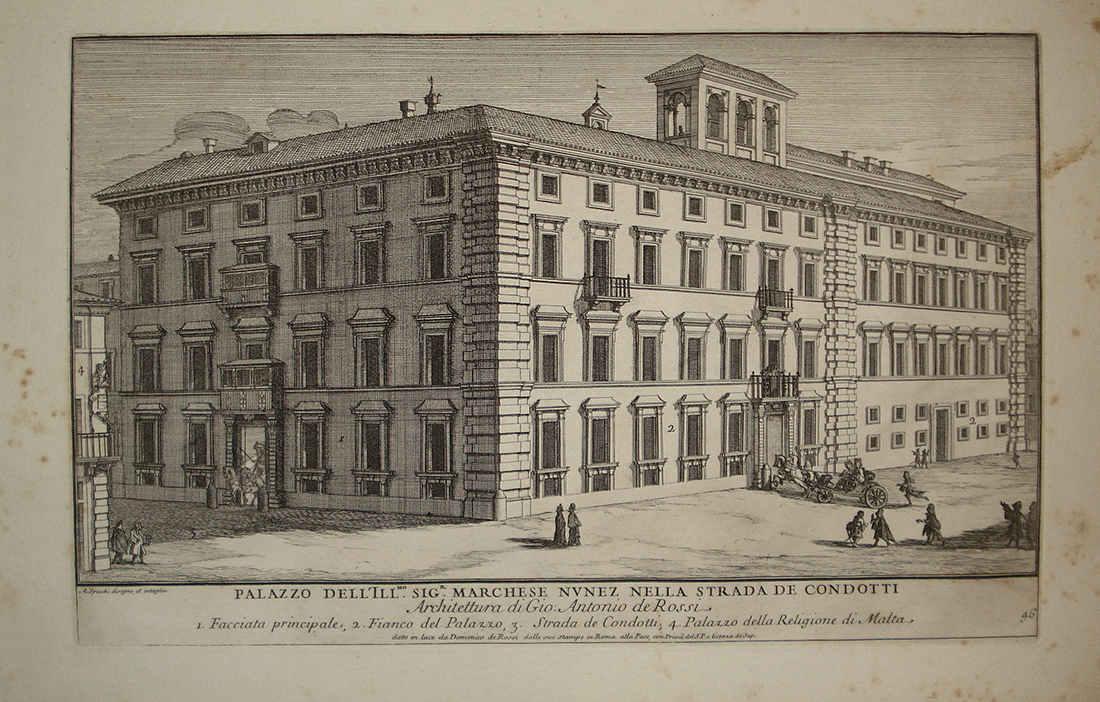
- Palazzo Núñez-Torlonia - engraving by Alessandro Specchi (1690)
- Alternative names: Palazzo Nuñez, Palazzo Nuñez–Torlonia, Torlonia Square

General information
- Address: Via Bocca di Leone, 78, 00187 Roma, Italy
- Coordinates: 41°54′18″N 12°28′51″E
- Completed: 1660

Design and construction
- Architect(s): Giovanni Antonio De Rossi

Palazzo Núñez-Torlonia is a palace in Rome, central Italy, the current home of the Torlonia family.

== About ==
The palace was built in 1660 by Giovanni Antonio De Rossi for the marquis Francisco Nuñez–Sánchez. In 1806 the palace was acquired by prince Lucien Bonaparte, brother of the Emperor Napoleon Bonaparte. The latter's mother, Letizia Ramolino and his brother Prince Jérôme Bonaparte lived also here. In 1842 the palace was acquired by Prince Marino Torlonia, who commissioned the restoration to Antonio Sarti, extending the front over Via Bocca di Leone.

For some time the space in the front of the palace was called Torlonia Square. In front of the entrance is the Torlonia Fountain. It consists of an ancient Roman sarcophagus resting on lion paws. Above the sarcophagus a mask pours water, which comes out of two taps in the base and flows, into a semicircular marble pond with two small columns. The fountain is inserted within an architectural element with side pillars, surmounted by an arch with the coat of arms of the Torlonia family between two lions rampant. An inscription below the arch commemorates the building of the fountain at the expense of duke Marino Torlonia in an area that belonged to him.

Alessandro Torlonia, 5th Prince di Civitella-Cesi, lived in the palace from the time of his marriage with the Infanta Beatriz of Spain until his death in 1986. At that time the owners of the Palace were the Prince Alessandro Torlonia and his two sisters the princess Donna Cristiana Torlonia di Civitella-Cesi (who died in 1970) and princess Marina Torlonia di Civitella-Cesi (who died in 1960). After Alessandro's death, Beatriz sold her part to her son-in-law Paul Annik Weiller (the father of Princess Sibilla of Luxembourg) and Francis Alexander Shields (the son of princess Marina Torlonia di Civitella-Cesi and father of actress Brooke Shields), sold his part to the architect Renato Bocchi. Later Paul Annik Weiller also sold to Bocchi his part with a condition that princess Beatriz Torlonia could remain in the palace until her death. The palace today belongs to a Japanese group and the family Torlonia has many apartments.

Beatriz of Spain died here in 2002.
