= Karastoyanova =

Karastoyanova is a surname. Notable people with the surname include:

- Helene Karastoyanova (born 1933), Bulgarian composer
- Poli Karastoyanova (born 1969), Bulgarian politician
