= Hoosier Schoolboy =

1937 film by William Nigh

- Directed by: William Nigh
- Written by: Edward Eggleston (novel The Hoosier Schoolmaster); Robert Lee Johnson (screenplay)
- Produced by: Ken Goldsmith (associate producer)
- Starring: Mickey Rooney; Anne Nagel; Frank Shields
- Cinematography: Paul Ivano
- Edited by: Roy V. Livingston
- Production company: Monogram Pictures
- Distributed by: Monogram Pictures
- Release date: July 7, 1937
- Running time: 62 minutes
- Country: United States
- Language: English

Hoosier Schoolboy is a 1937 American drama film directed by William Nigh and starring Mickey Rooney, Anne Nagel and Frank Shields.

== Plot ==
Mary Evans (Anne Nagel) moves to a small town in Indiana to take a teaching job in the local school. She checks in at the Noble Hotel when a young bellhop named Shockey Carter (Mickey Rooney) brings her suitcase upstairs to her room. When Shockey comes back downstairs, he encounters some classmates coming out of a dance. One of them, Roger Townsend, drops a quarter on the floor and tells Shockey to "Buy your old man another quart." Miss Evans, meanwhile, is shocked to find a drunk man (Frank Shields) in her hotel room, whom the hotel manager introduces as John 'Jack' Matthews Jr., the dairy owner's son.

The next morning, Shockey waits on the school grounds for Roger to arrive. When he does, he grabs Roger's shirt and confronts him about what he said Saturday night at the hotel. With Roger not wanting to fight, Shockey punches him anyway and heads inside the school, late for Miss Evans' first class. She recognizes Shockey from that night at the hotel. Roger arrives soon after and sits beside Shockey. In the middle of History class, Roger makes nasty remarks about Shockey's background. When Roger's remarks get worse, Shockey punches Roger again, starting a classroom fight. Miss Evans breaks it up the fight and takes both boys to Principal Miss Hodges' office to explain. Miss Hodges explains to Mary that while Roger comes from a fine family and could not be blamed for any coarse behavior (Shockey does not mention what Roger had said), Shockey is a "bad boy" and such behavior is expected from him.

After class, Miss Evans tries to find out from Shockey his side of the story, but the boy is reluctant to talk, accepting his lot in life. She gets him to take her to his house, across the train tracks into the woods. Shockey enters the house first to wake up his father (Edward Pawley) (whom he calls "Cap") and get him out of bed. Shockey invites Miss Evans in the house and shows her pictures of his father when he fought in the War to much acclaim for his bravery. Miss Evans and Captain Fred Carter talk about Shockey's fight. Mary offers to help Shockey and his father clean their home. Though Shockey says the house will just get messy again, he accepts her help.

Later, Mis Evans and Shockey walk to school from his house on the day of a school board meeting about his behavior. At the meeting, Mr. Townsend says they should expel Shockey and send him to the state school of corrections. Shocked, Mary counters that he needs kindness and understanding. As the meeting continues, Shockey is outside leaning against a tree when classmate Elvira comes over. She asks if the school board is going to expel him, and he replies Miss Evans is speaking for him. Elvira teases Shockey, calling him Miss Evans' "pet". Very offended, Shockey knocks Elvira's school books out of her hands. When she says that a gentleman would pick up the books and apologize, Shockey does, and Elvira thanks him. "I think you're the strongest boy in the class," she says. "Think so?", Shockey asks, "how would you like me to take a whack at some guy for you?" Mary comes out and announces that Shockey won't be expelled. As Mary walks off, Shockey tries to ask Elvira out on a date, but had a hard time putting the words together because he is so in love with her.

A big benefit party takes place at the school, with food sold in combination boxes. Again Roger teases Shockey about his father. Just as Shockey is about to punch Roger again, Elvira restrains his fist. Shockey comes up with a slightly less violent way to react to Roger, grabbing a handful of ice cubes by a punch bowl and stuffing it down the back of his shirt.

In a dare by Elvira insinuating that he doesn't know how to dance, Shockey suddenly starts tap-dancing and turns to the applause of the crowd, clamoring for another round, one of whom is Miss Hodges who acknowledges that he might've been too hard on the boy. Shockey's dancing is interrupted by Captain Carter's barging in uninvited and drunk, shattering some cups and making everyone uncomfortable. He is escorted out by Jack, followed by Miss Evans and Shockey.

Back to the Cap's house, Jack, in an effort to help curtail the Captain's drinking habit, gives Shockey's father a job under his father's company as a driver. Because of the rising tensions between townsfolk and Mr. Matthews Sr, the Captain crashes his delivery truck in a re-enactment of his shell-shocked memories of the war, resulting in his death. The Captain's death solved the tension, and Shockey observes that the Cap died a hero after all. Shockey is offered a room by Mr. Matthews Sr. and the final shot consists of him, Shockey, Miss Evans, and Jack riding off in a car.

== Cast ==
- Mickey Rooney as Shockey Carter
- Anne Nagel as Mary Evans
- Frank Shields as John 'Jack' Matthew, Jr.
- Edward Pawley as Captain Fred Carter
- William Gould as John Matthew, Sr.
- Dorothy Vaughan as Miss Hodges the School Principal
- Anita Deniston as Elvira
- Harry Hayden as Mr. Townsend
- Bradley Metcalfe as Roger Townsend
- Doris Rankin as school girl
- Walter Long as Riley
- Helena Grant as school girl
- Cecil Weston as Teacher
- Mary Field as School Board Secretary
- Zita Moulton as school girl
- Fred Kelsey as Mr. Crowder
- Mildred Kornman as school girl (uncredited)

== Bibliography ==
- Halliwell, Leslie. Halliwell's Film Guide. Paladin/Grafton, 1988
- Smith, David L. Hoosiers in Hollywood. Indiana Historical Society, 2006.
