= Mary Elsie Moore =

American railroad heiress (1889–1941)

- Born: October 22, 1889; Brooklyn, New York, U.S.
- Died: December 21, 1941 (aged 52); New York City, U.S.
- Other names: Donna Elsie Torlonia, the "Dollar Duchess"
- Occupation: American heiress
- Title: Princess of Civitella-Cesi
- Spouse: Don Marino Torlonia, 4th Prince of Civitella-Cesi (m. 1907; div. 1928)
- Children: Donna Olimpia Torlonia dei Principi di Civitella-Cesi; Don Alessandro Torlonia, 5th Prince di Civitella-Cesi; Donna Cristina Torlonia dei Principi di Civitella-Cesi; Donna Marina Torlonia dei Principi di Civitella-Cesi
- Parent(s): Charles Arthur Moore; Mary L. Campbell
- Relatives: Francis Alexander Shields (grandson); Brooke Shields (great-granddaughter)

Mary Elsie Moore, Princess di Civitella-Cesi (October 22, 1889 – December 21, 1941), was an American railroad equipment heiress who married and divorced Italian Prince Don Marino Torlonia, 4th Prince of Civitella-Cesi.

== Early life ==
Mary Elsie Moore was born October 22, 1889, in Brooklyn, New York, the youngest child of Charles Arthur Moore (1846–1914) and Mary (née Campbell) Moore (1854–1928). Her father was a shipping broker and hardware manufacturer from Connecticut, who went on to become the president of Manning, Maxwell and Moore, a large industrial concern.

Her siblings were Charles Arthur Moore Jr. who married Annete Sperry and Elizabeth Hyde (maternal grandfather of actress Glenn Close); Eugene Maxwell Moore, who married Titanic survivor Margaret Graham; and Jessie Ann Moore, who married the son of U.S Navy Admiral Colby Mitchell Chester.

Moore was educated at Mrs. Dow's School in Briarcliff Manor, New York.

== Personal life ==
On August 15, 1907, Moore married the then Duke of Poli and Guadagnolo Don Marino Torlonia (1861–1933) at Old Orchard, her parents' estate in Belle Haven, Greenwich, Connecticut. She was nicknamed, "the Dollar Duchess" by the media. Upon his brother Augusto Torlonia's death in 1926, her husband became the 4th Prince of Civitella-Cesi. Together, the Prince and Princess of Civitella-Cesi had four children:

- Princess Donna Olimpia Torlonia di Civitella-Cesi
- Don Alessandro Torlonia, 5th Prince di Civitella-Cesi (1911–1986), who married Infanta Beatriz of Spain (1909–2002), the daughter of King Alfonso XIII of Spain.
- Princess Donna Cristina Torlonia di Civitella-Cesi (1913–1974), was married to banker Daniel Lord from 1935 until 1937.
- Princess Donna Marina Torlonia di Civitella-Cesi (1916–1960), who married two Americans: Francis Xavier Shields (by whom she had several children, including a son who became the father of the actress Brooke Shields) and Edward Slater.

In 1922, the Duke of Torlonia fought a duel with Count Filippo Lovatelli, the famous Italian sculptor, over a statue of the Duchess, causing an international sensation.

The Prince of Torlonia was having an affair. In 1925, the couple separated and in 1926, the Duchess filed for divorce in the United States. Her American citizenship was brought into question, but the Connecticut courts decided that her residence in the state was legal and granted her divorce in February 1928.

Once settled in the United States she became a socialite, active in society life in New York City and Newport, Rhode Island. Moore died at her home, 375 Park Avenue in New York City, on December 21, 1941.
