= Poli (given name) =

Poli is a given name. Notable people with the name include:

- Poli Díaz (born 1967), Spanish boxer
- Poli Genova (born 1987), Bulgarian musical artist
- Poli Karastoyanova (born 1969), Bulgarian politician and economist
- Poli Marichal (born 1956), Puerto Rican artist
