= Princes of Civitella-Cesi =

Prince of Civitella-Cesi is an Italian title of nobility granted to Giovanni Torlonia (1755–1829) of the Torlonia family.

In exchange for the administration of finances of the Holy See with the blessing of the Pope, Giovanni Torlonia was created in 1794 a noble of the Holy Roman Empire, he bought in 1803 from the Odescalchi family the titles of Duke of Bracciano and Count of Pisciarelli (but later the Princes Odescalchi bought back their titles); in 1809 Pope Pius VII made him Marquis of Romavecchia and Turrita, and 1st Prince of Civitella Cesi (Princeps Romanus); in 1809 he was created also a Roman Patrician (with Papal confirmation of that honor on January 19, 1813) and in 1820 became Duke of Poli and Guadagnolo, with other titles. He was the builder of the Villa Torlonia in Rome.

== Princes of Civitella-Cesi ==
- Giovanni Torlonia, 1st Prince of Civitella-Cesi (born Siena, May 1754, died Rome, 25 Feb 1829), in 1814 created Prince of Civitella-Cesi, who in September 1793 married in Rome Anna Maria Schultheiss (born Donaueschingen, 23 August 1760, died Rome, 4 November 1840)
- Alessandro Torlonia, 2nd Prince of Civitella-Cesi
- Augusto Torlonia, 3rd Prince of Civitella Cesi (20 January 1855 - 17 April 1926).
- Marino Torlonia, 4th Prince of Civitella-Cesi
- Alessandro Torlonia, 5th Prince of Civitella-Cesi, husband of Infanta Beatriz of Spain (daughter of King Alfonso XIII and descendant of Queen Victoria)
- Marco Torlonia, 6th Prince of Civitella-Cesi
- Giovanni Torlonia, 7th Prince of Civitella-Cesi (b. Rome 18 Apr 1962); on 9 June 2001 he married Carla De Stefanis (born Rome 23 Nov 1966) in the Palazzo Torlonia, Rome.
  - Heir-Apparent: Don Stanislao (born January 2005)
