= Francis Alexander Shields =

American businessman (1941–2003)

- Born: Francis Alexander Shields Jr. May 16, 1941; New York City, New York, U.S.
- Died: April 25, 2003 (aged 61); Palm Beach, Florida, U.S.
- Other name: Frank Shields
- Education: University of Pennsylvania
- Spouses: Teri Schmon (m. 1964; div. 1966) Diana Lippert (m. 1970)
- Children: 4, including Brooke
- Parents: Francis Xavier Shields (father); Marina Torlonia di Civitella-Cesi (mother)
- Relatives: Marino Torlonia, 4th Prince of Civitella-Cesi (grandfather); Mary Elsie Moore (grandmother)

Francis Alexander Shields Jr. (May 16, 1941 – April 25, 2003) was an American businessman and an executive at Revlon in New York City. He was the father of actress Brooke Shields.

== Early life ==
Shields was born in New York City. He was the eldest son of Francis Xavier Alexander Sr., a top-ranking American tennis player and Davis Cup winner, and Italian Princess Donna Marina Torlonia di Civitella-Cesi. After his parents' divorce, his father married Katharine Mortimer in 1949.

He attended the Buckley School in Manhattan and St. Paul's School in Concord, New Hampshire. He attended in the University of Pennsylvania. While at Penn, he captained the crew that rowed in the Henley Royal Regatta in 1962 and was a member of St. Anthony Hall.

== Career ==
Shields began his career with Wall Street brokerage Loeb Rhoades. He then worked in sales and marketing for cosmetics firms Revlon and Estee Lauder. He also worked for Handy Associates, an executive recruiting firm in New York City.

He formed his own real estate firm, Frank Shields Associates, in Palm Beach, Florida in 1989.

== Personal life ==
In 1964, Shields married Maria Theresia "Teri" Schmon. They had a daughter, Brooke Christa Shields in 1965. They divorced when their daughter was five months old.

In 1970, he married Diana "Didi" Lippert, former wife of Thomas Gore Auchincloss (son of Hugh D. Auchincloss). They had three daughters: Marina Torlonia Shields, Olympia Torlonia Shields, and Christina Torlonia Shields.

An avid hunter and fisherman, Shields spent much of his free time at Canoe Creek, at a camp he owned in rural west Florida.

He was a longtime member of The Brook, The Bath and Tennis Club in Palm Beach, Florida, Piping Rock Club, and The Racquet and Tennis Club.

In 1980, Shields founded the Power Ten, a New York nonprofit organization supporting youth rowing and making contributions to the U.S. National rowing team and U.S. Olympic rowing team through the National Rowing Foundation and Row New York.

In 2003, Shields died in Palm Beach, of a "protracted illness" at the age of 61. After his death, the National Rowing Foundation offered the Frank Shields Fellowships.
