= Augusto Torlonia, 3rd Prince of Civitella Cesi =

Don Augusto Torlonia (1855–1926), of the House of Torlonia, was an Italian nobleman and third Prince of Civitella-Cesi. Augusto inherited the title from his grandfather's younger brother, Alessandro Torlonia, 2nd Prince of Civitella-Cesi.

Augusto was born in Rome on 20 January 1855 and died in Borgo San Donnino on 17 April 1926. His father was Giulio, 2nd Duke of Poli and Guadagolo, and his mother was Donna Teresa dei Principi Chigi-Albani.

Upon Augusto's death, the title passed to his brother, Marino Torlonia, 4th Prince of Civitella-Cesi.
