= 41st Young Artist Awards =

2020 US media awards ceremony

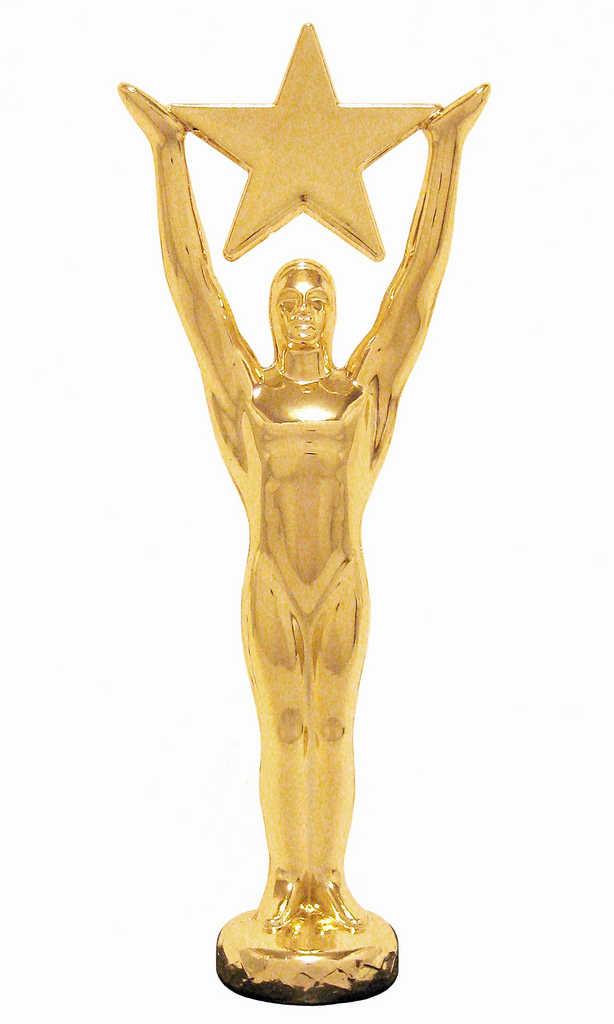
- Awarded for: Achievement during the year 2019 in film, television, streaming, and new media
- Date: November 24, 2020
- Site: Online (due to COVID-19 pandemic)

The 41st Young Artist Awards ceremony, presented by the Young Artist Association, honored excellence of young performers between the ages of 5 and 18 in film, television, streaming, and new media for the 2019 calendar year.

Presenters included Scarlett Johansson, Ian McKellen, Jonathan Frakes, George Takei, David Hyde Pierce, Jane Leeves, and Bill Mumy.

== Winners and nominees ==
=== Best Performance in a Feature Film ===
Best Performance in a Feature Film – Leading Youth Artist	Best Performance in a Feature Film – Leading Young Actress
★ Christian Convery – Playing With Fire: Richie Lawrence – Astronaut; Nicole Moorea Sherman – Between the Darkness	★ Lexy Kolker – Freaks: Opal Littleton – Dark Light; Lilou Roy‑Lanouette – Jouliks
Best Performance in a Feature Film – Supporting Teen Artist	Best Performance in a Feature Film – Supporting Young Artist
★ Bella Altamura – Unplanned: Cameron Brodeur – Midway; Xochitl Gomez – Shadow Wolves	★ Sonia Maria Chirila – Pet Sematary: Christian Convery – William; CC King – Stranger in the Night; David Kohlsmith – Shazam!; Ella Ryan Quinn – Lucky Day

=== Best Performance in a Short Film ===
Best Performance in a Short Film – Teen Actor	Best Performance in a Short Film – Teen Actress
★ JAC Carrera – Homecoming: Dogen Eyeler – Bad Books: UFO; Josh Elliott Pickel – An Intercession with Quinn; Jordan Poole – Your Two Cents – Game of Phones; Bryson Robinson – AriesScope 21st Annual Halloween Short; Tyler Robinson – Petersburg	★ Isabella Fowler – Anny Minute Now: Eden Summer Gilmore – Sabby & Szabo; Montana Jacobowitz – Edgewood, Ohio; Jolie Ledford – Clueless; Madeline Lupi – The Ghost in the Darkness; Valentyna Sichko – Coda
Best Performance in a Short Film – Young Actor	Best Performance in a Short Film – Young Actress
★ Jeffery Benson – The Boy Hero: Emperor Kaioyus – American Marriage; Marik Knight – Mermaid; Tyson Larter – Your Own Good; Lucas Royalty – A Purgatory Story; Ta'j – Sunnyside	★ Ava Augustin – A Rock and a Hard Place: Lacey Caroline – The Big L; Avery Garcia – When the Wolf Comes Home; Maëlla Gougeon‑Larouche – Inclassables; Kate Roman – Butterfly; Franiya Tiffany – History of Memory: It's a Boy

=== Best Performance in a Streaming Film ===
Best Performance in a Streaming Film – Teen Artist	Best Performance in a Streaming Film – Young Artist
★ Chalet Lizette Brannan – Friday the 13th: Vengeance: Dylan Duff – Anne of Green Gables; Breanna Engle – One Winter Night	★ Bradley Bundlie – Deviant Love: Dobromir Mashukov – Acceleration; Mia Moore – Surprise Me!; Brooklyn Robinson – Blood Runs Thick

=== Best Performance in a Streaming Series ===
Best Performance in a Streaming Series – Leading Teen Artist	Best Performance in a Streaming Series – Leading Young Actor
★ Cameron Brodeur – Ghostwriter: Dylan Duff – The Frat; Simone Miller – Detention Adventure; Alina Prijono – Detention Adventure; Bryson Robinson – The Last Kids On Earth	★ Isaiah Givens – Soundtrack: Sage Mayer – Chi‑nanigans; Brandin Stennis – Science Fair; Ja' Siah Young – Raising Dion
Best Performance in a Streaming Series – Leading Young Actress	Best Performance in a Streaming Series – Teen Artist
★ Mallian Butler – Legitimately Mallie!: Opal Littleton – Prank Encounters; Brianni Walker – Kool School	★ Chalet Lizette Brannan – Wicked Enigma: Óscar Castan – The Morning Show; Montana Jacobowitz – 2Real4U; Josh Elliott Pickel – Or So the Story Goes
Best Performance in a Streaming Series – Young Artist	
★ Bradley Bundlie – Sonder: Christian Convery – Stranger Things; Marcus Cornwall – Holly Hobbie; Ines Feghouli – Anne With an E; Alyssa Gervasi – The Umbrella Academy; Ayush Rajmachikar – Mar Mar Land	

=== Best Performance in a TV Movie ===
Best Performance in a TV Movie – Teen Artist	Best Performance in a TV Movie – Young Artist
★ Kiefer O'Reilly – Time for You to Come Home for Christmas: Paris Smith – My Stepfather's Secret; Caylin Turner – Baby in a Manger	★ Sebastian Billingsley‑Rodriguez – Sweet Mountain Christmas: Lacey Caroline – A Christmas Love Story; Samarah Conley – Last Vermont Christmas; Ava Grace Cooper – Holiday Date

=== Best Performance in a TV Series ===
Best Performance in a TV Series – Leading Teen Artist	Best Performance in a TV Series – Leading Young Artist
★ Alec Dahmer – Bajillionaires: Gabrielle Nevaeh Green – All That; Ricardo Ortiz – Bajillionaires; Sloane Morgan Siegel – Dwight in Shining Armor	★ Raphael Alejandro – Bunk'd: Samarah Conley – How Am I Doing?; Christian Convery – Pup Academy; Ethan Hutchison – Queen Sugar
Best Performance in a TV Series – Supporting Teen Artist	Best Performance in a TV Series – Supporting Young Actor
★ Samson Boldizar – Big Top Academy: Dylan Duff – Dark Side of the Ring; Athena Park – Holly Hobbie	★ Devin Trey Campbell – Single Parents: Tim Luca Schmidt – Schmitz & Family; Toby Woolf – Summer of Rockets
Best Performance in a TV Series – Supporting Young Actress	Best Performance in a Television Series – Guest Starring Teen Artist
★ Hannah Bos – Riverdale: Ines Feghouli – Première Ligne; Jessica Mikayla – You're the Worst	★ Roman Dean George – Just Roll with It: Ricardo Ortiz – Gabby Duran & the Unsittables; Sloane Morgan Siegel – NCIS
Best Performance in a Television Series – Guest Starring Young Actor	Best Performance in a Television Series – Guest Starring Young Actress
★ Sebastian Billingsley‑Rodriguez – When Calls the Heart: Christopher Convery – Chicago Med; Connor Laidman – American Gods	★ Eva Ariel Binder – All Rise: Brooke Fontana – Kidding; Jessica Mikayla – Fresh Off the Boat
Best Performance in a Television Series – Recurring Teen Artist	Best Performance in a Television Series – Recurring Young Artist
★ Arista Arhin – Star Trek: Discovery: Genea Charpentier – The Man in the High Castle; Christian Michael Cooper – When Calls the Heart; Eden Summer Gilmore – Nancy Drew; Ricardo Ortiz – Unspeakable	★ Ava Grace Cooper – When Calls the Heart: Islie Hirvonen – The Flash; Adelynn Spoon – Watchmen; Jadian Toros – Bajillionaires; Ava Weiss – When Hope Calls

=== Best Performance in a TV Commercial ===
Best Performance in a TV Commercial – Teen Artist	Best Performance in a TV Commercial – Young Artist
★ Bryson Robinson – Fast & Furious: Spy Racers: Will Simmons – Sprite; Brandin Stennis – Super Mario Bowser's Castle Playset	★ Eli D. Goss – 85 Years and 4 Generations: Jacob Lemieux – Jif Son of Jef; Maya Misaljevic – Band‑Aid; Ian Nunney – CalFresh Healthy Living; Juliette Maxyme Proulx – DuProprio Singer; Maja Vujicic – Royale Velour

=== Best Performance in a Voice‑Over Role ===
Best Performance in a Voice‑Over Role – Youth Artist

★ Dogen Eyeler – Archie & Flynn

- Roman Dean George – Life Is Strange 2
- Islie Hirvonen – Pup Academy
- Logan Nicholson – Blue's Clues & You
- Cali Poley – Iögo Nanö Yogurt
- Lilou Roy‑Lanouette – Jouliks

=== Best Performance in a Music Video ===
Best Performance in a Music Video – Youth Artist

★ Logan Bailey – Sick In the Head

- Isabelle Dubroy – No Princess
- Jax Malcolm – Run Run Rudolph
- Trinity Rose – Coughing Up Flowers
- Brandin Stennis – Perfect Man

=== Outstanding Awards ===
Outstanding Music Vocalist	Outstanding Music Single
★ Sofia Evangelina – Smile: Montana Jacobowitz – Ask Me Why I Cry; Lohé – Loved & Hated	★ Samarah Conley – Rain: Sofia Evangelina – Smile; Elizabeth Irving – Remember; Montana Jacobowitz – Let Me In; Trinity Rose – Miss You (with Aidan Gallagher)
Outstanding Influencer	Outstanding Writer
★ Beorht: Scarlett Bella; Óscar Castan; Samantha Denisee; Montana Jacobowitz	★ Dylan Duff – The Frat: Dana Koops – Driver's Ed; Josh Elliott Pickel – Pagliacci; Tyler Robinson – Petersburg; Sloane Morgan Siegel – Dwight in Shining Armor – Truthberry Cobbler
Outstanding Producer	Outstanding Director
★ Dylan Duff – The Frat: Kaleb Laidman – Petersburg; Josh Elliott Pickel – Pagliacci	★ Dana Koops – Driver's Ed: Kaleb Laidman – Petersburg; Josh Elliott Pickel – Pagliacci

== Special awards ==
- Outstanding Breakout Performance Award – Roman Griffin Davis; Archie Yates; Thomasin McKenzie (JoJo Rabbit)
- Community Leadership Award – Maxwell Jenkins
- Lifetime Achievement Award – Patrick Stewart
- Icon Award – Kelsey Grammer
- Journalistic Excellence Award – Trevor Noah
- Legend Award – Brooke Shields
- Inspiration to Youth in Television Award – Robert Herjavec
- Youth Mentorship in Business Award – Mark Cuban
- Contribution to Science Award – Rod Roddenberry
