= Poli, Andika =

Poli پلي
- Village
- Location within Iran
- Coordinates: 32°25′46″N 49°37′40″E
- Country: Iran
- Province: Khuzestan
- County: Andika
- Bakhsh: Chelo
- Rural District: Lalar and Katak

Population (2006)
  - Total: 320
- Time zone: UTC+3:30 (IRST)
  - Summer (DST): UTC+4:30 (IRDT)

Poli (Persian: پلي, also Romanized as Polī; also known as Pollow) is a village in Lalar and Katak Rural District, Chelo District, Andika County, Khuzestan Province, Iran. At the 2006 census, its population was 320, in 51 families.
