= Palazzo Torlonia =

Coordinates: 41°54′09.36″N 12°27′39.60″E

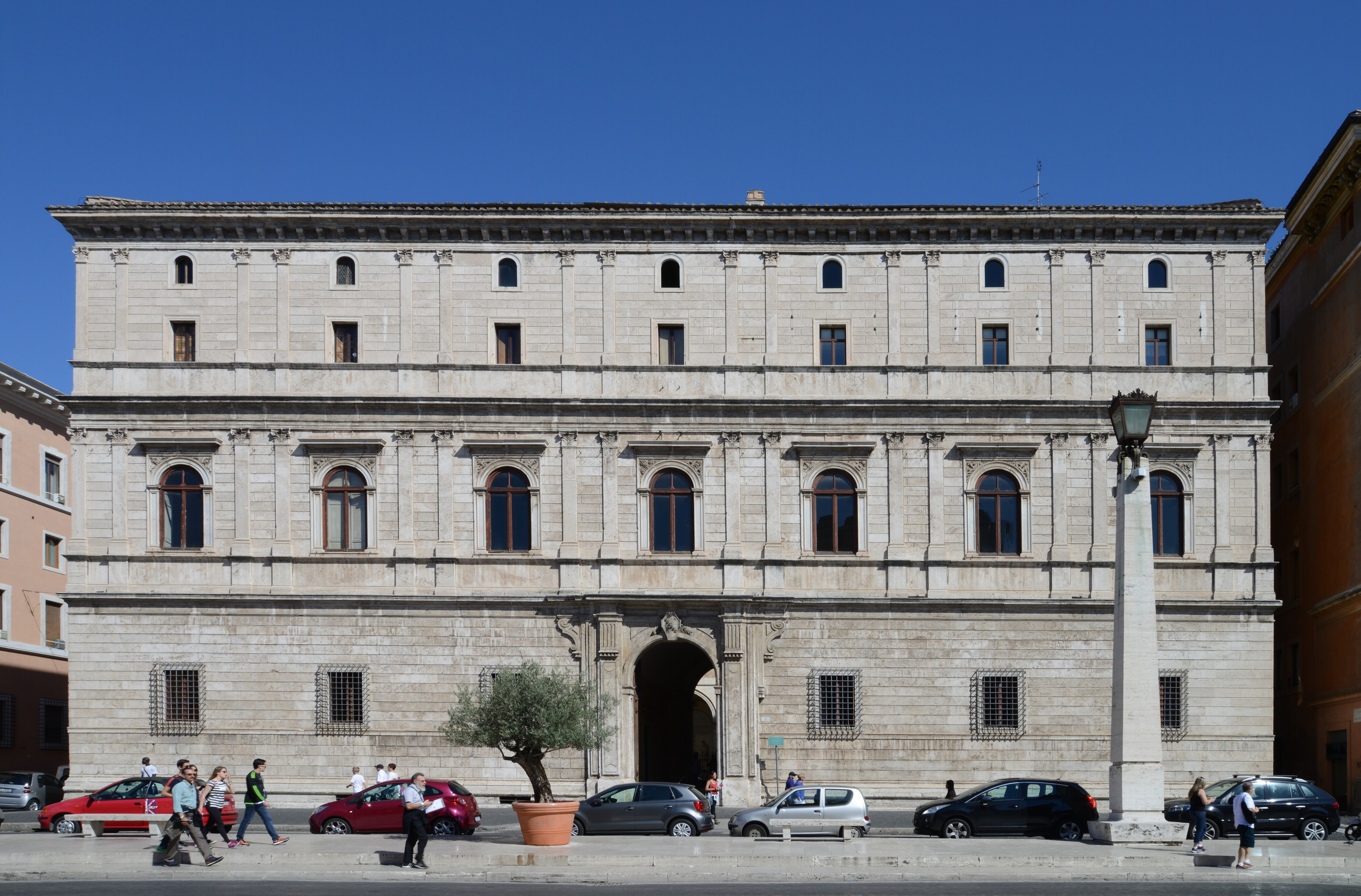
- Palazzo Torlonia
- Interactive map of the Palazzo Torlonia area

General information
- Location: Rome, Italy

Palazzo Torlonia (also known as the Palazzo Giraud, Giraud-Torlonia or Castellesi) is a 16th-century Renaissance town house in Via della Conciliazione, Rome, Italy. Built for Cardinal Adriano Castellesi da Corneto from 1496, the architect was Andrea Bregno, although others have attributed the design to Bramante.

The style of architecture was influenced by that of the papal chancery, the Palazzo della Cancelleria, one of Rome's first Renaissance palaces, which had been completed a few years earlier. The palazzo's arcaded inner courtyard has been attributed to Raphael.

In 1504, before its completion, the Cardinal (who had fallen from papal favor) presented the palazzo to King Henry VII of England. The English king Henry VIII later handed it to Lorenzo Campeggio, England's last Cardinal Protector. He lived in the unfinished palazzo from 1519 to 1524. Following England's split from the Church of Rome, it remained in possession of the Campeggio family until 1609.

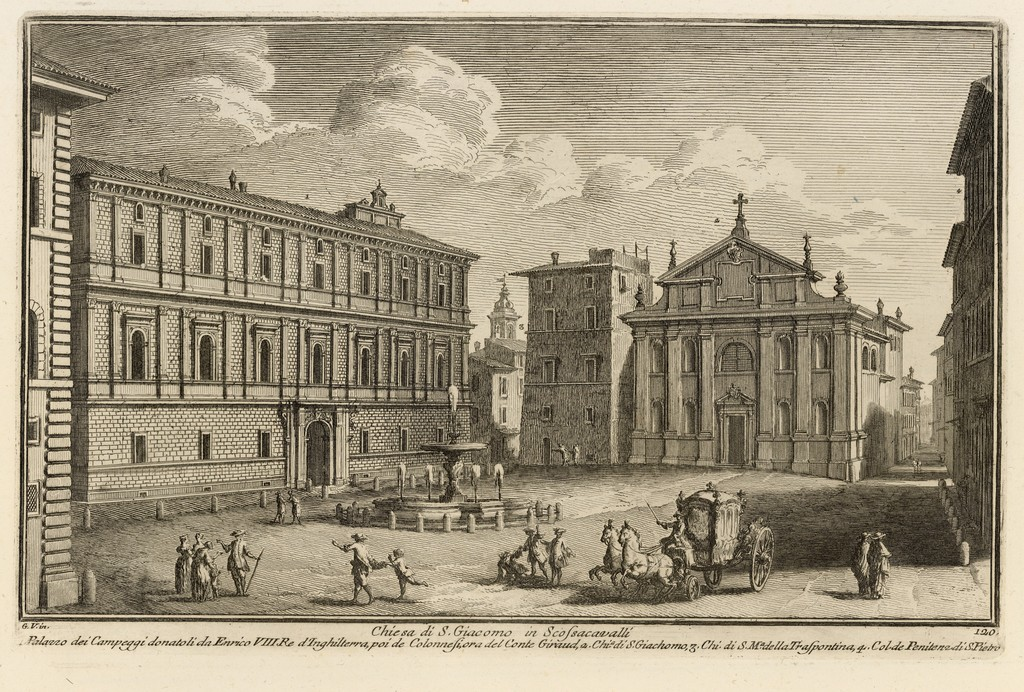
The Palazzo before the creation of the Via della Conciliazione, on Piazza Scossacavalli. The neighbouring buildings and the church of San Giacomo were destroyed to make way for the new road, the fountain was remounted in front of Sant'Andrea della Valle.

From 1609 until 1635, it was owned by the Borghese family. In 1760, it was purchased by the French Giraud banking family. In 1820, it was purchased by the Torlonia family, whose name it retains along with the family's coat of arms above its great portal.

Today, the palace faces the wide boulevard named Via della Conciliazione, however, this is the result of 20th century monumental Fascist concept intended to provide an imposing approach to St Peter's Basilica. Originally, the palazzo formed the north side of a small square, the Piazza Scossacavalli, and is today (with the Palazzo dei Penitenzieri) one of the two surviving buildings of it, and the only historic palace in Borgo which has remained untouched during the works for the construction of Via della Conciliazione. Palazzo Torlonia, together with the Church of Santa Maria in Transpontina and Palazzo Latmiral (a 19th-century building placed between them), are out of axis with the new avenue, their alignment coinciding with that of the destroyed Borgo Nuovo road.

As of 2015, the palazzo remains the property of the Torlonia family.

== See also ==
- Palazzo Núñez-Torlonia
- Palazzo Bolognetti Torlonia
- Villa Torlonia, Rome

== Sources ==
- Champ, Judith (2000). The English pilgrimage to Rome: a dwelling for the soul. Leominster: Gracewing. ISBN 0-85244-373-0.
- Bazza, Ruth (2000). La dolce Vita de Alessandro Lequio.
