= Marino Torlonia, 4th Prince of Civitella-Cesi =

Italian prince (1861–1933)

Marino Torlonia
- Prince of Civitella-Cesi
- Born: 29 July 1861; Poli, Italy
- Died: 5 March 1933 (aged 71)
- Noble family: Torlonia
- Spouse: Mary Elsie Moore (m. 1907; div. 1928)
- Issue: Princess Donna Olimpia Torlonia; Alessandro Torlonia, 5th Prince of Civitella-Cesi; Princess Donna Cristina Torlonia; Princess Donna Marina Torlonia
- Father: Prince Don Giulio Torlonia, 2nd Duke di Poli e di Guadagnolo
- Mother: Princess Donna Teresa Chigi della Rovere-Albani

Marino Torlonia (29 July 1861 – 5 March 1933), 4th Prince of Civitella-Cesi, son of the duke of Poli and Guadagnolo, was an Italian nobleman.

== Biography ==
He was born in Poli, Italy, the sixth son of Prince Don Giulio Torlonia, 2nd Duke di Poli e di Guadagnolo, and his wife, Princess Donna Teresa Chigi della Rovere-Albani. His brother, Leopoldo Torlonia, 3rd Duke of Poli and Guadagnolo, became Mayor of Rome.

Torlonia's paternal grandmother was Princess Donna Anna Sforza-Cesarini, a descendant of Ludovico Sforza, Duke of Milan and patron of Leonardo da Vinci. Torlonia's maternal grandmother was Princess Donna Leopoldina Doria-Pamphili-Landi, the granddaughter of Princess Leopoldina of Savoy, a princess of the royal family of Piedmont and Sardinia, which later became the Royal Family of Italy. The descendant of many popes, Torlonia inherited the administration of the Banca Torlonia, which worked the finances of the Vatican and several other investments. He was one of the richest noblemen in Italy around the beginning of the twentieth century, and introduced the first motor car in Rome.

== Personal life ==
On August 15, 1907, Torlonia married Mary Elsie Moore (1889–1941), a Connecticut heiress who was studying in Rome. She was a daughter of the American shipping broker Charles Arthur Moore, a tool manufacturer in Greenwich, Connecticut, and of Mary L. Campbell. Mary Elsie Moore's brothers were Eugene Maxwell Moore (who married Titanic survivor Margaret Graham) and her niece, Bettine Moore, daughter of another brother, Charles Arthur Moore, Jr. (who was a part of Robert Peary's Arctic Expedition in the summer of 1897), married William Taliaferro Close (they are the parents of actress Glenn Close).

Marino Torlonia and Mary Elsie Moore had four children:

- Princess Donna Olimpia Torlonia di Civitella-Cesi
- Don Alessandro Torlonia, 5th Prince of Civitella-Cesi (1911–1986), who married the Infanta Beatriz of Spain (1909–2002), the daughter of King Alfonso XIII of Spain.
- Princess Donna Cristina Torlonia di Civitella-Cesi
- Princess Donna Marina Torlonia di Civitella-Cesi (1916–1960), who married two Americans: Francis Xavier Shields (1909–1975) (by whom she became grandmother of the actress Brooke Shields) and Edward Slater.

He died on 5 March 1933.

== Ancestry ==
Ancestors of Marino Torlonia, 4th Prince of Civitella-Cesi

8. Prince Don Giovanni-Raimundo Torlonia, Duke of Bracciano
4. Prince Don Marino Torlonia, Duke of Bracciano, of Poli and Guadagnolo
9. Anna Maria Marta Gertrude Schultheiss
2. Prince Don Giulio Torlonia, 2nd Duke of Poli and Guadagnolo
10. Prince Don Francesco Sforza-Cesarini, Duke of Segni
5. Princess Donna Anna Sforza-Cesarini
11. Donna Gertrude Conti, Duchess of Poli and Guadagnolo
1. Prince Don Marino Torlonia, 4th Prince di Civitella-Cesi
12. Prince Don Agostino Chigi della Rovere, Prince of Farnese
6. Prince Don Sigismondo Chigi della Rovere, Prince of Farnese
13. Princess Donna Carlotta Amalia Barberini-Colonna
3. Princess Donna Teresa Chigi della Rovere-Albani
14. Prince Don Luigi Doria-Pamphilj-Landi, Prince of Melfi
7. Princess Donna Leopoldina Doria-Pamphilj-Landi
15. Princess Donna Teresa Orsini dei Duchi di Gravina

== See also ==
- House of Torlonia
