= Poli Karastoyanova =

Bulgarian politician and economist

Poli Krasteva Karastoyanova

Personal details
- Born: 28 September 1969 (age 56) Plovdiv, Bulgaria
- Profession: Economist, Politician

Poli Krasteva Karastoyanova (Bulgarian: Поли Кръстева Карастоянова; born 28 September 1969) is a Bulgarian politician and economist, chairman of the parliamentary Culture and Media Committee, deputy chairman of the Economic Policy and Tourism Committee, MP of PG 'Patriotic Front' in 43 th National Assembly.

== Biography ==
Karastoyanova was born on September 28, 1969, in Plovdiv. She graduated in University of National and World Economy. Her master's degree "Management of PR and Mass Communication" was received in the New Bulgarian University.

She has worked for Bulgarian and foreign companies as a financial consultant. In 2003 she became executive director of the Bulgarian organization for congress tourism. One of the founders of the National Tourism Board. MP from the Patriotic Front (Bulgaria) at the 43rd National Assembly, chairman of the Culture and Media Committee.

Karastoyanova is the creator and host of specialized economic program Tourism Trend on BBT, which affected important aspects of the industry and the complex relationship between the state and the business sector. In the show she discussed with her guests key issues related to the development of tourism and international image of Bulgaria as an investment destination.

Karastoyanova is a member in a number of organizations, some of which SKAL International Sofia, International Public Relations Association, International Women's Club Sofia. She is fluent in English and Portuguese.
