= Alessandro Torlonia, 5th Prince of Civitella-Cesi =

Italian noble

Alessandro Torlonia
- Prince of Civitella-Cesi
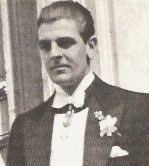
- Prince Alessandro Torlonia of Civitella-Cesi in the 1935
- Born: 7 December 1911; Rome, Italy
- Died: 1 or 12 May 1986 (aged 74); Palazzo Nuñez-Torlonia, Rome, Italy
- Noble family: Torlonia
- Spouse: Infanta Beatriz of Spain (m. 1935)
- Issue: Sandra, Countess Clemente Lequio di Assaba; Marco Torlonia, 6th Prince of Civitella-Cesi; Marino Torlonia; Olimpia Weiller
- Father: Marino Torlonia, 4th Prince of Civitella-Cesi
- Mother: Mary Elsie Moore

Don Alessandro Torlonia, 5th Prince of Civitella-Cesi (7 December 1911 – 1 May/12 May 1986) was an Italian banking heir and a member of the House of Torlonia.

== About ==
Born in Rome on 7 December 1911, Torlonia was the son of Marino Torlonia, 4th Prince di Civitella-Cesi and his American wife, Mary Elsie Moore. Don Alessandro's youngest sister was Donna Marina Torlonia di Civitella-Cesi, grandmother of the American actress Brooke Shields. Thus he was Shields's grand-uncle. On the death of his father in 1933, he inherited large estates as well as his father's princely and other titles.

In 1941, when his mother was dying in New York City, Torlonia took a high speed boat from Portugal and was arrested in error by FBI, thinking he was an enemy of the state and taken to Ellis Island.

Not to be confused with his cousin with the same name, Alessandro Torlonia (1925–2017), Prince of Fucino and Prince assistant to the papal throne, head of another branch of the family. In the 1980s, this cousin Torlonia held the title as the "richest man in Rome", as he was the heir to a banking fortune and owner of the famous Torlonia Collection of ancient art.

He died in the Palazzo Nuñez-Torlonia, Rome, in 1986.

== Marriage and children ==
Arms of Don Alessandro Torlonia, 5th Prince di Civitella-Cesi.

On 14 January 1935, Don Alessandro morganatically married in Rome the Infanta Beatriz of Spain (1909–2002), a daughter of King Alfonso XIII of Spain and of Princess Victoria Eugenie of Battenberg.

- Donna Sandra Torlonia (14 February 1936 – 31 December 2014), she married Count Clemente Lequio di Assaba on 20 June 1958. They had two children:
  - Don Alessandro Lequio di Assaba (17 June 1960) he married Antonia Dell’Atte on 12 October 1987, and they were divorced in 1991. They have one son. He remarried María Palacios Milla on 15 November 2008. They have one daughter. He has also an illegitimate son with Ana Obregón.
    - Don Clemente Lequio di Assaba (2 April 1988)
    - Don Alejandro Lequio di Assaba (23 June 1992 – 13 May 2020)
    - Donna Ginevra Lequio di Assaba (17 August 2016)
  - Donna Desideria Lequio di Assaba (19 September 1962) she married Count Oddone Tournon on 11 September 1986. They have two sons:
    - Count Giovanni Tournon (3 September 1991)
    - Count Giorgio Tournon (17 February 1994)
- Marco Torlonia, 6th Prince of Civitella-Cesi (2 July 1937 – 5 December 2014) he married Donna Orsetta Caracciolo dei principi di Castagneto on 16 September 1960. They had one son and two grandchildren. He remarried Philippa McDonald on 9 November 1968, and they were divorced in 1975. They had one daughter and three grandchildren. He remarried thirdly Blažena Svitáková on 11 November 1985. They had one daughter and two grandsons.
  - Giovanni Torlonia, 7th Prince of Civitella-Cesi (born 18 April 1962), who married Carla DeStefanis on 9 June 2001, with issue:
    - Prince Stanislao of Civitella-Cesi (born January 2005)
    - Princess Olimpia of Civitella-Cesi (born 2008)
  - Princess Vittoria Eugenia Carolina Honor Paola Alexandra Maria Torlonia (born 8 May 1971), who married Kenneth Lindsay on 20 December 1997, and they were divorced. They have two children. She remarried to Stefano Colonna and they have one daughter:
    - Josephine Lindsay (born 1998)
    - Benedict Lindsay (born 2001)
    - Francesca Colonna (born 2008)
  - Princess Catarina Agnes Torlonia (born 14 June 1974), who married Stefano d’Albora on 28 July 2000, with issue:
    - Gianpaolo d’Albora (born 2002)
    - Gianmarco d’Albora (born 2003)
- Don Marino Torlonia (born 13 December 1939 – 28 December 1995) died unmarried and without issue.
- Donna Olimpia Torlonia (born 27 December 1943) she married Paul-Annick Weiller on 16 June 1965. They have six children:
  - Beatrice Aliki Victoria Weiller (23 March 1967) she married Brazilian Ambassador André Aranha Corrêa do Lago (brother of Pedro Corrêa do Lago) on 23 June 1990. They have four children:
    - Paul-Annik Weiller Corrêa do Lago (24 January 1996)
    - Helena Weiller Corrêa do Lago (8 June 1997)
    - Antonio Weiller Corrêa do Lago (29 May 1999)
    - Victoria Weiller Corrêa do Lago (27 December 2000)
  - Sibilla Sandra Weiller (12 June 1968) she married Prince Guillaume of Luxembourg on 8 September 1994. They have four children:
    - Prince Paul-Louis of Nassau (4 March 1998)
    - Prince Léopold of Nassau (2 May 2000)
    - Princess Charlotte of Nassau (2 May 2000)
    - Prince Jean of Nassau (13 July 2004)
  - Paul Alexandre Weiller (12 February 1971 – 10 April 1975) he died at the age of four years old.
  - Laura Daphne Lavinia Weiller (23 January 1974 – 5 March 1980) she died at six years old.
  - Cosima Marie Elizabeth Edmee Weiller (18 January 1984)
  - Domitilla Louise Marie Weiller (14 June 1985)

== Ancestry ==
Ancestors of Alessandro Torlonia, 5th Prince of Civitella-Cesi

8. Marino Torlonia, Duke di Bracciano e Poli e Guadagnolo
4. Giulio Torlonia, 2nd Duke di Poli e Guadagnolo
9. Donna Anna Sforza-Cesarini
2. Marino Torlonia, 6th Prince di Civitella-Cesi
10. Sigismondo Chigi della Rovere Albani, Prince di Farnese
5. Donna Teresa Chigi della Rovere Albani
11. Donna Leopoldina Doria-Pamphilj-Landi
1. Alessandro Torlonia, 5th Prince di Civitella-Cesi
12. William Ropes Moore
6. Charles Arthur Moore
13. Caroline Van Ness
3. Mary Elsie Moore
14. John Keyes Campbell
7. Mary Campbell
15. Betsey Sheffield
