= Infanta Beatriz of Spain =

Spanish infanta (1909–2002)

Beatriz of Spain
- Princess of Civitella-Cesi
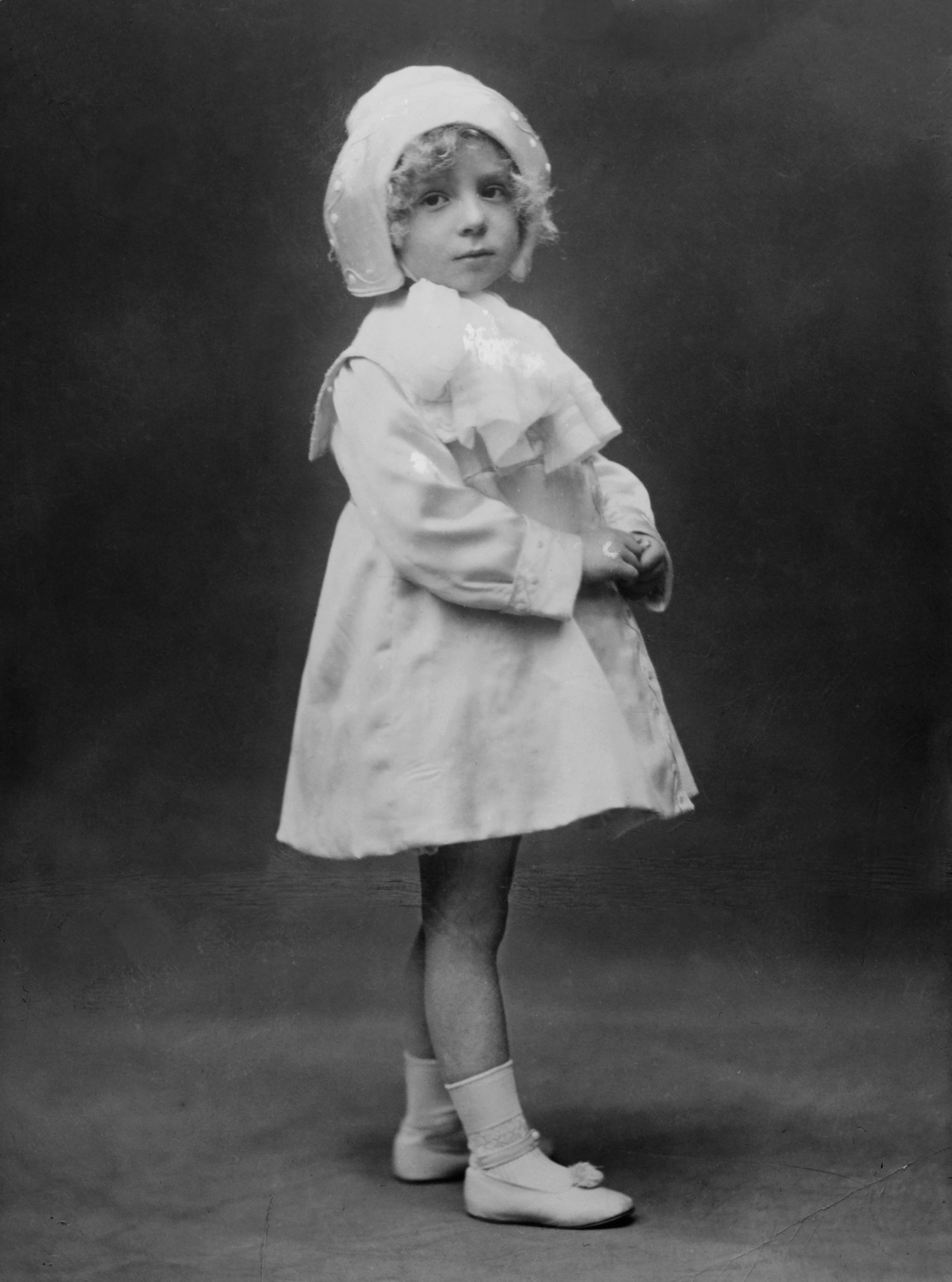
- Infanta Beatriz c. 1912
- Born: 22 June 1909; Royal Palace of La Granja de San Ildefonso, Segovia, Spain
- Died: 22 November 2002 (aged 93); Palazzo Torlonia, Rome, Italy
- Burial: Campo Verano, Rome, Italy
- Spouse: Don Alessandro Torlonia, 5th Prince of Civitella-Cesi (m. 1935; died 1986)
- Issue: Sandra, Countess Clemente Lequio of Assaba; Marco Torlonia, 6th Prince of Civitella-Cesi; Marino Torlonia; Olimpia Weiller
Names
- Spanish: Beatriz Isabel Federica Alfonsa Eugenia Cristina Maria Teresia Bienvenida Ladislàa
- House: Bourbon
- Father: Alfonso XIII
- Mother: Victoria Eugenie of Battenberg

Infanta Beatriz of Spain, Princess of Civitella-Cesi (Beatriz Isabel Federica Alfonsa Eugénie Cristina Maria Teresia Bienvenida Ladislàa de Borbón y Battenberg; 22 June 1909 – 22 November 2002) was a daughter of King Alfonso XIII of Spain and Victoria Eugenie of Battenberg and the wife of Alessandro Torlonia, 5th Prince di Civitella-Cesi. She was a paternal aunt of King Juan Carlos I.

== Childhood ==
Born at the royal palace of La Granja, San Ildefonso near Segovia, Spain on 22 June 1909, Infanta Beatriz was the third child among the six surviving children of King Alfonso XIII of Spain and Victoria Eugenie of Battenberg. She was named Beatriz after her maternal grandmother, Princess Beatrice of the United Kingdom, the youngest daughter of Queen Victoria; Isabel for her great-aunt, Infanta Isabel; Federica for Princess Frederica of Hanover in whose house her parents had become engaged; Alfonsa after her father; Eugenia for Empress Eugénie of the French, her mother's godmother, Cristina and Maria for Maria Christina of Austria, her paternal grandmother, Teresia after Empress Maria Theresa and Ladislaa after Ladislaus the Posthumous.

Infanta Beatriz was educated within the walls of the Palacio de Oriente by English nannies. She learned English and French along with Spanish. The children spoke in English to their mother and Spanish to their father. Infanta Beatriz and her sister Maria Cristina, two years her junior, yearned to go to private schools like the daughters of the nobility who frequented the palace as their playmates, but, following Spanish tradition, they were educated by governesses and private tutors. They studied languages, history, religion and took piano and dancing lessons. Their parents placed great importance on outdoor exercise and Infanta Beatriz became fond of sports. She was a very good swimmer, played tennis and golf and loved horseback riding. While in Madrid she played in the palace gardens and made excursions on horseback. In summer the royal family moved to Palacio de la Magdalena, near Santander, where they practiced water sports. The two sisters also made some visits to England to stay with their maternal grandmother at Kensington Palace.

== Early life ==
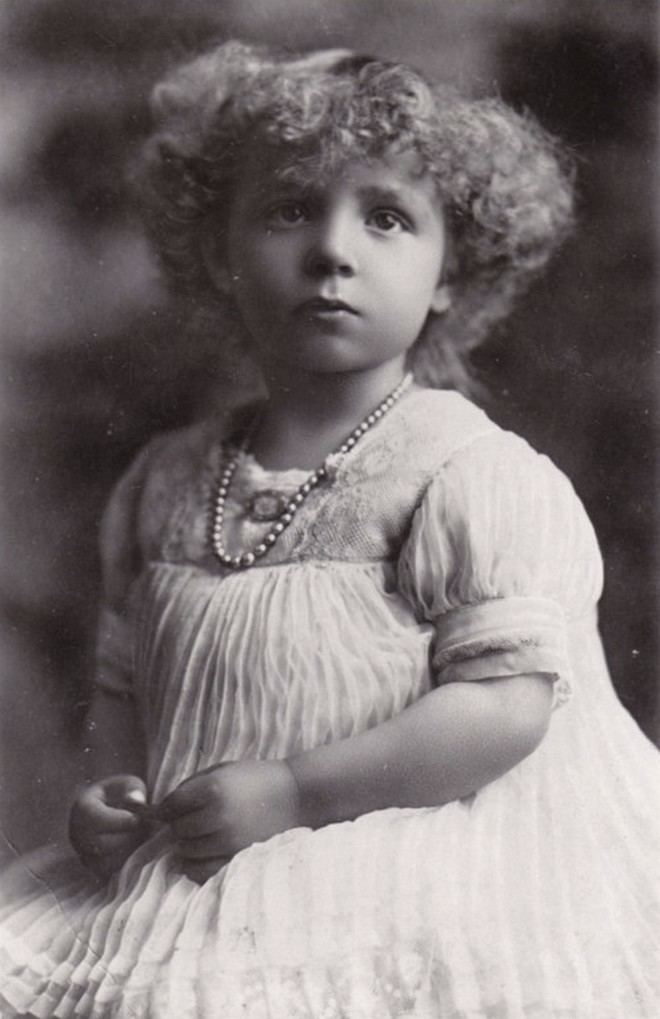
Infanta Beatriz of Spain at age four

During the late 1920s, Infanta Beatriz and her sister Infanta Cristina presided at a number of official engagements while heading various institutions and sponsoring events. They were involved with, among other issues, animal protection. Beatriz and her sister took nursing classes, helping twice a week at the Red Cross in Madrid from 9 am to 1 pm and from 3 to 7 pm. Beatriz was president of the Red Cross in San Sebastián, working there during the royal family's summer vacation. The two infantas, always elegantly dressed, were of contrasting looks; one blonde one dark. Beatriz, who resembled her Spanish relatives, was a brunette, tall and lean like her father. Her official debut in society was celebrated in 1927 with a court ball at the royal palace. Among her friends were the Dukes of Alba, Fernán Núñez and Aveyro. The shadow of hemophilia marked her life: Her eldest and youngest brothers were hemophiliacs. Her second brother, Jaime, was deaf and only the third brother, Juan, was completely healthy.

In 1929, Infanta Beatriz turned twenty years old. She fell in love with Miguel Primo de Rivera y Sáenz de Heredia, the youngest son of Miguel Primo de Rivera, who served as Prime Minister of Spain from 1923 to January 1930 with dictatorial powers. They were seen taking horse rides together, but a marriage between them was out of the question. When the dictator found out about their romance, he sent his son abroad. Because Beatriz and her sister could be carriers of hemophilia, like their mother, King Alphonso XIII was reluctant to follow the tradition of finding husbands for them among Catholic royal princes. The two sisters' constant companions were their cousins Alvaro, Alonso and Ataúlfo de Orleans y Borbón, the three sons of Infante Alfonso de Orleans y Borbón. It was expected that Infanta Beatriz would marry Alonso and Maria Cristina, Alvaro, but nothing came out of it as their companionship was interrupted when the turbulent political situation in Spain derailed their lives.

== Exile ==
The support that Alfonso XIII gave to the unpopular dictatorship of Primo de Rivera discredited the king. Municipal elections, held on 12 April 1931, were unfavorable to the monarchy. The Second Spanish Republic was proclaimed two days later. Lacking the backing of the military forces, King Alfonso felt obliged to leave the country the same day, but did not abdicate, hoping to be called back to the throne. Infanta Beatriz, her mother and her siblings, except for Infante Don Juan, who was away on assignment in the Spanish navy, were left behind in Madrid. Following the advice of her supporters, the queen and her five children left the Royal Palace by car to El Escorial, and from there, they took a train to France.

The royal family's first home in exile was the Hôtel Meurice in Paris. They soon moved to a private wing of the Savoy Hotel in Fontainebleau. Accompanied by their mother, the two infantas made visits to Paris twice a week by car or with a lady in waiting by train. While in Paris they spent time with horses at a riding school or playing tennis with friends. The marriage of their parents was unhappy and even in Spain the King and Queen led separate lives. Once in exile, the royal couple separated permanently. Queen Victoria Eugenie moved to London and later to Lausanne, Switzerland and the two infantas lived for a time with her. In 1933 the king moved to Rapallo and as life was too isolated for Beatriz and her sister in Lausanne, they moved with their father to Italy. At his daughters' insistence, King Alfonso moved to Rome and rented a house for them there. Infanta Beatriz and her sister became friends with the members of the Italian royal family and quickly adapted to life in Rome.

In 1934 tragedy struck. Beatriz, who was spending summer vacation in Pörtschach am Wörthersee in Austria, was driving a car with her brother Gonzalo as passenger. Trying to avoid a bicycle rider who had crossed their path, she slammed the car into a wall. The accident did not, at first, seem serious, but Infante Gonzalo, a hemophiliac, was bleeding internally and died in the early hours of the following day, 13 August 1934.

== Marriage and issue ==
At the time of her brother's death, Infanta Beatriz was looking forward to her wedding. While visiting Ostia, she was introduced to an Italian aristocrat, Alessandro Torlonia, 5th Prince di Civitella-Cesi. Torlonia, who had inherited large estates from his father in 1933, was the son of Marino, 4th Prince di Civitella-Cesi and Mary Elsie Moore, an American heiress. His family had acquired a fortune in the 18th and 19th centuries by administering the finances of the Vatican, receiving the title of Prince of Civitella-Cesi in 1803 from Pope Pius VII. Although Don Alessandro was a prince, he did not belong to a reigning or formerly reigning dynasty, so Beatriz had to marry him morganatically, renouncing her rights of succession to the throne of Spain. Alfonso XIII, realizing that the combination of the threat of hemophilia and their situation in exile would make it difficult for his daughters to find royal husbands, gave his consent to this union.

The wedding took place on 14 January 1935 at the Church of the Gesù with Beatriz wearing a 20-foot train, a coronet of orange blossom holding her veil in place, in the presence of King Alfonso, the King and Queen of Italy and some 52 princes of the blood royal. Thousands of Spaniards traveled from Spain to give support to the deposed royal family in what became a political event. However, neither Queen Victoria Eugenie nor Beatriz's eldest brother, Alfonso, Count of Covadonga, who were on bad terms with the King, attended the wedding. After the ceremony, the young couple was received by Pope Pius XI.

Infanta Beatriz of Spain, Princess of Civitella-Cesi, and her husband had four children, eleven grandchildren and nineteen great-grandchildren:

- Donna Sandra Torlonia (14 February 1936 – 31 December 2014), she married Count Clemente Lequio di Assaba on 20 June 1958. They had two children:
  - Don Alessandro Lequio di Assaba (17 June 1960) he married Antonia Dell’Atte on 12 October 1987 and they were divorced in 1991. They have one son. He remarried María Palacios Milla on 15 November 2008. They have one daughter. He has also an illegitimate son with Ana Obregón.
    - Don Clemente Lequio di Assaba (2 April 1988)
    - Don Alejandro Lequio di Assaba (23 June 1992 - 13 May 2020)
    - Donna Ginevra Lequio di Assaba (17 August 2016)
  - Donna Desideria Lequio di Assaba (19 September 1962) she married Count Oddone Tournon on 11 September 1986. They have two sons:
    - Count Giovanni Tournon (3 September 1991)
    - Count Giorgio Tournon (17 February 1994)
- Marco Torlonia, 6th Prince of Civitella-Cesi (2 July 1937 – 5 December 2014) he married Donna Orsetta Caracciolo dei principi di Castagneto on 16 September 1960. They had one son and two grandchildren. He remarried Philippa McDonald on 9 November 1968 and they were divorced in 1975. They had one daughter and three grandchildren. He remarried thirdly Blažena Svitáková on 11 November 1985. They had one daughter and two grandsons.
  - Giovanni Torlonia, 7th Prince of Civitella-Cesi (born 18 April 1962), who married Carla DeStefanis on 9 June 2001, with issue:
    - Prince Stanislao of Civitella-Cesi (born January 2005)
    - Princess Olimpia of Civitella-Cesi (born 2008)
  - Princess Vittoria Eugenia Carolina Honor Paola Alexandra Maria Torlonia (born 8 May 1971), who married Kenneth Lindsay on 20 December 1997 and they were divorced. They have two children. She remarried to Stefano Colonna and they have one daughter:
    - Josephine Lindsay (born 1998)
    - Benedict Lindsay (born 2001)
    - Francesca Colonna (born 2008)
  - Princess Catarina Agnes Torlonia (born 14 June 1974), who married Stefano d’Albora on 28 July 2000, with issue:
    - Gianpaolo d’Albora (born 2002)
    - Gianmarco d’Albora (born 2003)
- Don Marino Torlonia (born 13 December 1939 – 28 December 1995) died unmarried and without issue.
- Donna Olimpia Torlonia (born 27 December 1943) she married Paul-Annick Weiller on 16 June 1965. They have six children:
  - Beatrice Aliki Victoria Weiller (23 March 1967) she married Brazilian Ambassador André Aranha Corrêa do Lago (brother of Pedro Corrêa do Lago) on 23 June 1990. They have four children:
    - Paul-Annik Weiller Corrêa do Lago (24 January 1996)
    - Helena Weiller Corrêa do Lago (8 June 1997)
    - Antonio Weiller Corrêa do Lago (29 May 1999)
    - Victoria Weiller Corrêa do Lago (27 December 2000)
  - Sibilla Sandra Weiller (12 June 1968) she married Prince Guillaume of Luxembourg on 8 September 1994. They have four children:
    - Prince Paul-Louis of Nassau (4 March 1998)
    - Prince Léopold of Nassau (2 May 2000)
    - Princess Charlotte of Nassau (2 May 2000)
    - Prince Jean of Nassau (13 July 2004)
  - Paul Alexandre Weiller (12 February 1971 – 10 April 1975) he died at the age of four years old.
  - Laura Daphne Lavinia Weiller (23 January 1974 – 5 March 1980) she died at six years old.
  - Cosima Marie Elizabeth Edmee Weiller (18 January 1984)
  - Domitilla Louise Marie Weiller (14 June 1985)

== Later life ==
Infanta Beatriz settled with her husband in the Palazzo Torlonia, a 16th-century Early Renaissance town house on Via della Conciliazione in Rome. King Alfonso XIII died in 1941 and as the situation deteriorated in Italy during World War II, Infanta Beatriz with her family joined her siblings in Lausanne, spending the rest of the war close to their mother Queen Victoria Eugenie. Beatriz returned to Italy after the war and dwelt there for the rest of her life.

In 1950, while staying with her brother Juan, in Estoril, Portugal, Infanta Beatriz obtained authorization from Francisco Franco to make a visit to Spain. She returned to Spain on 25 August 1950 for the first time since her departure to exile almost twenty years earlier. She came with her husband and their daughter Sandra from Lisbon. They stayed at the Ritz hotel in Madrid visiting the palace of la Granja, where the Infanta was born, and the Cathedral-Basilica of Our Lady of the Pillar in Zaragoza. Infanta Beatriz was received with such a manifestation of support for the monarchy that after only a week, of a planned much longer visit, the government gave her only twenty four hours to leave the country.

Although the family tried to arrange a marriage for the Infanta's daughter, Sandra, with King Baudouin of Belgium, she caused her parents concern when in 1958 she married Clemente Lequio, a widower with a son, who was given the title "Count Lequio di Assaba" in 1963 by Umberto II of Italy. Sandra had a son and a daughter with Lequio, who died after a fall from an upper floor in his house in Turin in 1971.

Their son, Alesandro Lequio, moved to Spain in 1991 working initially for Fiat. Married to the Italian model Antonia Dell’Atte, a muse in the late 1980s of Giorgio Armani, Alessandro Lequio quickly became a favorite of the Spanish jet set and tabloids, when, after his divorce, he began a relationship with Ana Obregón, a Spanish actress and television presenter.

Infanta Beatriz's eldest son, Marco, married three times and had three children, one in each marriage. His eldest son, Don Giovanni Torlonia, is a well known designer.

Infanta Beatriz's second son, Marino, died unmarried in 1995 of HIV-related illnesses.

The youngest child, Olimpia, married in 1965 Paul-Annick Weiller (1933–1998), the first son of the aviator Paul-Louis Weiller of the Javal family. Among their six children is Princess Sibilla of Luxembourg.

Infanta Beatriz remained very fond of Spain and supported the claims to the Spanish throne of her brother Don Juan. In 1962, she joined the Spanish royal family in the celebration in Athens for the wedding of her nephew the future King Don Juan Carlos with Princess Sophia of Greece. A femur fracture in 1973 never healed completely, affecting Infanta Beatriz's mobility for the rest of her life. Her fragile health did not allow her to join her family at the ascension to the throne of King Juan Carlos, the wedding of the Infantas Elena and Cristina or the ceremonies for the return to Spain of the remains of her parents and siblings who had died in exile. Nevertheless, Infanta Beatriz not only survived all of her siblings, but visited Spain again in 1998 to visit la Granja. In 1999, the Infanta gave an interview with ¡Hola! Magazine, where she discussed her life and the years of the Royal Family's exile from Spain. She made her last visit to Spain in 2001 to be with her sister-in-law Doña Maria and returned to the Palacio de la Magdalena, near Santander, where 70 years earlier she had spent her summer vacation for 17 consecutive years until 1930.

She died at her home in Palazzo Torlonia, Rome on 22 November 2002 at 93 years 5 months. She was the last surviving legitimate child of Alfonso XIII and the last surviving legitimate grandchild of Alfonso XII of Spain.

== Honours ==
- Spain: 1,094th Dame Grand Cross of the Order of Queen Maria Luisa

== Arms ==
Heraldry of Infanta Beatriz of Spain

Coat of arms used before her marriage

Coat of arms used as Princess of Civitella-Cesi

Coat of arms used during King Juan Carlos's reign

== Ancestry ==
Ancestors of Infanta Beatriz of Spain

8. Infante Francisco de Asís of Spain
4. Alfonso XII of Spain
9. Isabella II of Spain
2. Alfonso XIII of Spain
10. Archduke Karl Ferdinand of Austria
5. Archduchess Maria Christina of Austria
11. Archduchess Elisabeth Franziska of Austria
1. Infanta Beatriz of Spain
12. Prince Alexander of Hesse and by Rhine
6. Prince Henry of Battenberg
13. Countess Julia Hauke
3. Princess Victoria Eugenie of Battenberg
14. Prince Albert of Saxe-Coburg and Gotha
7. Princess Beatrice of the United Kingdom
15. Victoria of the United Kingdom
