= Poli, Lazio =

Poli
- Comune
- Comune di Poli
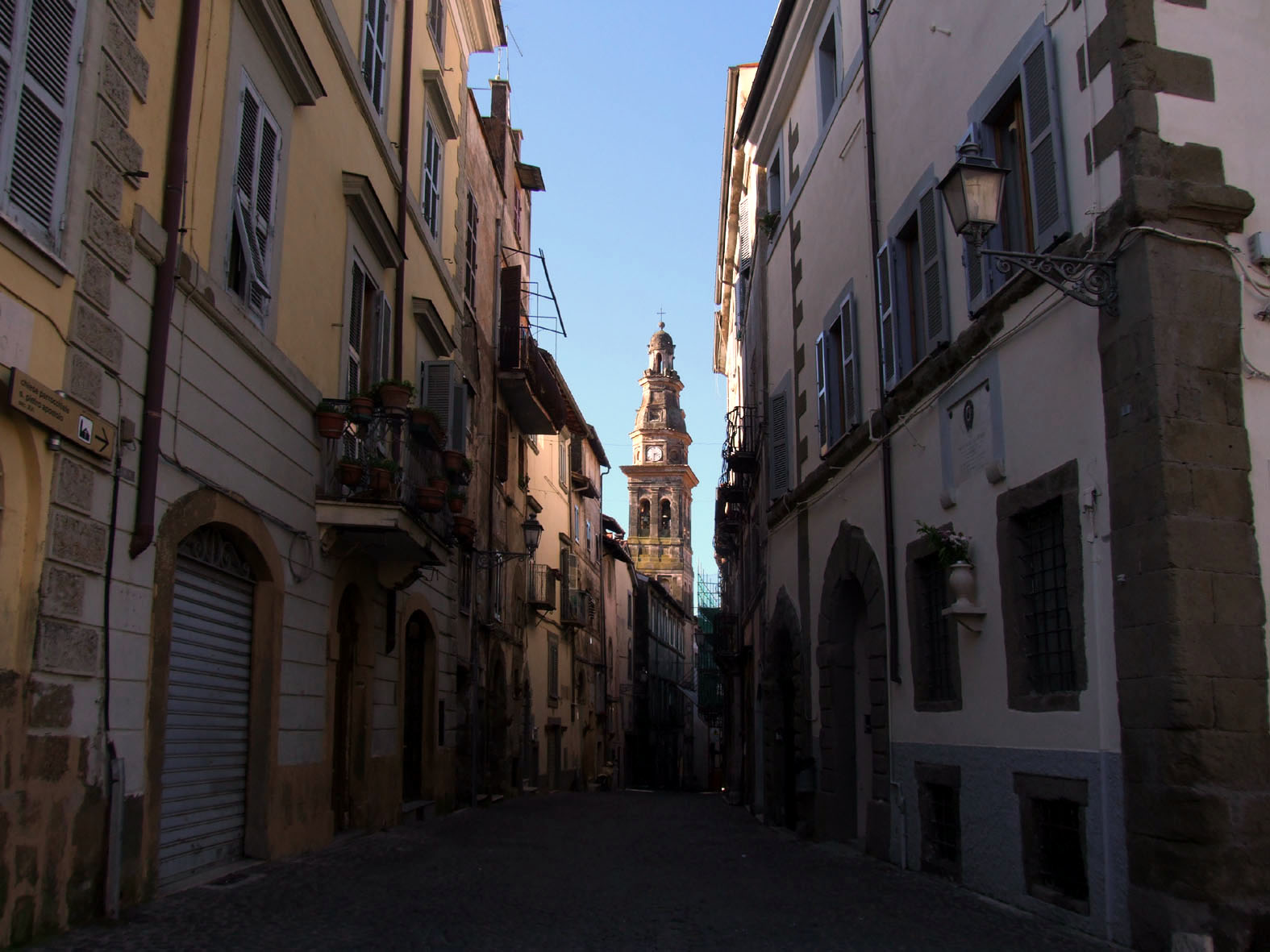
- View of Poli, Lazio

- Coat of arms

- Location within Italy Location within Lazio
- Coordinates: 41°53′N 12°53′E
- Country: Italy
- Region: Lazio
- Metropolitan city: Rome (RM)
- Frazioni: Cadipozze, Casale Pelliccioni, Casalvecchio, Colle Arnaro, Colle Cancelliere, Colle Spina, Ficozzivoli, Fossatello, La Cona, La Piantata, Magliuri, Moletta, Polledrara, Pratarello, Traglione, Villa Catena, Villa Luana

Government
  - Mayor: Federico Mariani

Area
  - Total: 21.39 km^{2} (8.26 sq mi)
- Elevation: 435 m (1,427 ft)

Population (31 March 2018)
  - Total: 2,386
  - Density: 111.5/km^{2} (288.9/sq mi)
- Demonym: Polesi
- Time zone: UTC+1 (CET)
  - Summer (DST): UTC+2 (CEST)
- Postal code: 00010
- Dialing code: 06
- Patron saint: St. Eustace
- Saint day: 20 September

Poli is a town and comune in Lazio in the Metropolitan City of Rome Capital. It is located in the Monti Prenestini area. It is also the birthplace of Pope Innocent XIII and Cardinals Agostino Vallini and Giannicolò Conti.

== Physical geography ==
=== Territory ===
The town of Poli is located in a large natural area ranging from the Lucretili Mountains to the Prenestini passing through the Tiburtini mountains. The entire municipality extends along a valley surrounded by woods. The ancient village of the village is completely surrounded by mountains, among which there are peaks over 1,000 meters above sea level.

Surrounded by mountains, the village itself leans at the foot of a mountain, Mount Guadagnolo (1218 meters above sea level). The top of the mountain has a rather unique appearance, so much so that it is called the alpine cliff of the Guadagnolo or cliff of the Guadagnolo, it is a mountain of calcareous composition, like the whole area. Guadagnolo is part of the municipality of Capranica Prenestina, which is about 10 km.

== Main sights ==
In its history, however, it has also been linked to the fate of Poli: in fact, in the twelfth century, were possessions of Odo III, who then ceded them to the family of the Counts, who ruled these territories for six centuries, after which the possessions passed into the hands of other houses.

The connection of the two territories was made official in 1826, a connection that lasted until 1930, when Guadagnolo passed under the municipality of Capranica Prenestina, of which it is still part. The two villages, since their foundation more than a thousand years ago, have always been linked by a common fate and for about 800 years they were part of the same fief. Since 2010, a panoramic road has been opened, which can also be accessed by cars, which connects Poli directly to Guadagnolo. There are, however, nature trails that lead from the cliff of Guadagnolo to different destinations, including Poli. The itinerary is that of the Cona, from the main square of Poli you take off the duct that points uphill the mountain, the path continues between olive groves and mixed trees, reached the Cona the vegetation changes radically, you advance between a damp and fresh wood. Continuing further you cross the Arcà ditch and after a short time you exit the forest from where you can admire the imposing fortress of Guadagnolo, stage of the itinerary.

Church of Sant'Antonio abate Church of San Giovanni

=== Climate ===
Poli is located in the middle of the Prenestini Mountains and is almost completely surrounded by mountains. The climate of Poli can however be identified in two distinct climate zones: in the lower part of the country is temperate, with cool summers and winters not too cold while in the upper part it is colder, with ventilated summers and cold winters and with the possibility of frequent snowfalls and rains. Both in the upper and lower parts, fog is frequent in cold seasons.

Climate classification: zone E, 2121 GR/G
