= Aliki Diplarakou =

Greek model

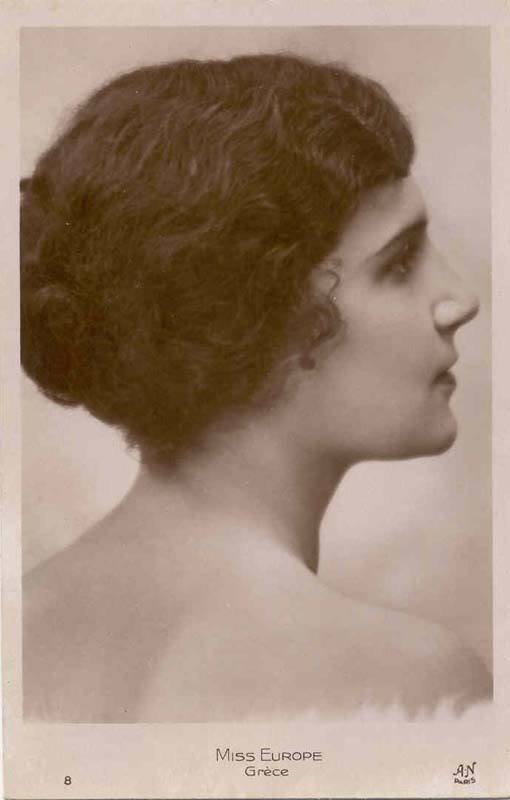
Aliki Diplarakou.

Aliki, Lady Russell (Greek: Αλίκη Διπλαράκου; born Aliki Diplarakou; 28 August 1912 – 30 October 2002) was the first Maniot Greek contestant to win the Miss Europe title. She previously had won the "Miss Hellas" (Μις Ελλάς) title at the Miss Star Hellas pageant.

== Family ==
She was the daughter of lawyer Georgios Diplarakos and his wife, the former Elena Nikolessi. She had three sisters:

- Nada Diplarakos (1911–1966), who married the French diplomat André Rodocanachi (who remarried the Dowager Duchess of Rohan, mother of the French Senator Josselin de Rohan)
- Cristina Diplarakos (1918–1999), who married Henri Claudel, Consul General of France in New York City and son of the French poet and diplomat Paul Claudel
- Edmée Diplarakos (1916–1983), who married Spiros Vassilopoulos.

Although the Diplarakou family lived in Athens, they originally were Maniots from Krini in the Peloponnese. The original family name was Vavouli (Βαβούλη) but it was changed to Aliki's paternal grandmother's maiden name of Diplarakou.

== Marriages ==
Diplarakou was married twice, her husbands being:

- Paul-Louis Weiller, a French aviator and director of the Gnome et Rhône conglomerate, a son of Lazare Weiller and wife Alice Javal. Guests at the couple's 31 October 1932 wedding included author Paul Morand, poet Paul Valéry, and diplomat Philippe Berthelot. Before divorcing, they had one child, Paul-Annick Weiller (Paris, 28 July 1933 – Geneva, 2 November 1998). Their son married in Rome, at Santa Maria in Trastevere, on 26 June 1965, Donna Olimpia Emmanuela Torlonia di Civitella-Cesi (b. Lausanne, Mont Choisi, 27 December 1943); they became the parents of Princess Sibilla of Luxembourg.
- Sir John Wriothesley Russell (23 August 1914 – 3 August 1984), an English diplomat, who was descended from John Russell, 6th Duke of Bedford. He served as Britain's ambassador to Ethiopia, Brazil, and Spain between 1962 and 1974. Married on 15 December 1945, the Russells had two children, Georgiana Alexandra Russell (born 1947 and became Lady Boothby) and Alexander Charles Thomas Wriothesley Russell (born 1950).

== Career ==
In 1929 Diplarakou entered the "Miss Hellas" pageant as Miss Athens. Her biggest competitor was Miss Thessaloniki Roxani Stergiou (Ρωξάνη Στεργίου), who came in second. Diplarakou won the title and represented Greece at the Miss Europe event in Paris, where she was crowned Miss Europe on 6 February 1930.

That same year the 18-year-old brunette beauty was once more given the chance to represent her country and Europe in the Miss Universe Contest. The event was held on 13 October 1930 in Rio de Janeiro, Brazil and Diplarakou was a runner-up.

She toured the United States giving lectures on ancient and modern Greek culture. Aside from her native Greek language, she also spoke fluent English, French and Italian.

She made headlines in the 1930s when she dressed up in men's clothing and infiltrated Mount Athos, where women are prohibited from entering. The Mount Athos story was later featured in Time on 13 July 1953, in an article titled "The Climax of Sin".

When asked by reporters on how she became Miss Europe, she was quoted in Time magazine as saying:

My mother, some friends and I were at tea one day last year at the British Embassy in Athens when someone for fun suggested we go look at the beauty contest being held in an Athens theatre. We went and sat in a box. The judges ... suddenly called out my name. I thought they were fooling ... When I tried to refuse, the President of Greece said I must accept as a patriotic duty. Three days later I found myself in Paris: I won the European contest, and of course had then to go through with it and go to Rio.

She also tried her skills in theater, her first appearance being in Prometheus Bound.
