= Jenny Aubry =

French psychiatrist and psychoanalyst

- Born: Marie Jenny Emilie Weiss; 8 October 1903; Paris, France
- Died: 21 January 1987 (aged 83); Paris, France
- Spouses: Alexandre Roudinesco; Pierre Aubry
- Children: Élisabeth Roudinesco
- Family: Louise Weiss (sister); Paul-Louis Weiller (cousin); Alice Weiller (aunt); Louis Émile Javal (grandfather); Lazare Weiller (uncle-by-marriage)

Marie Jenny Emilie Aubry (née Weiss; 8 October 1903 – 21 January 1987) was a French psychiatrist and psychoanalyst.

== Life and career ==
Jeanne Félicie Weiss (née Javal; 1871–1956) was born to a Jewish Alsatian family of the Parisian middle-class elite. Her mother Jeanne Javal was the daughter of Louis Émile Javal, who is known as the father of orthoptics. Her father Paul Louis Weiss (1867–1945) was a Protestant Lutheran engineer. She was the sister of the famous suffragette and writer Louise Weiss.

She did a medical internship with neurologist Clovis Vincent in 1934. Between 1935 and 1939, she specialized in child neuropsychiatry under Georges Heuyer. In 1939, Aubry became the second female doctor officially titled "médecin des hôpitaux" in France, after Thérèse Bertrand-Fontaine.

Having worked with the Resistance during the war, she discovered psychoanalysis through Anna Freud in 1948, and trained as a psychoanalyst under the supervision of Jacques Lacan, with whom she developed a friendship and whom she followed through the various splits of the French psychoanalytic movement.

Aware too of the work of such figures as René Spitz and John Bowlby, Aubry began to specialise in the treatment of institutionalised children, exploring the role of maternal deprivation in their symptomatology. Her book Enfance Abandonée was published in 1953, and her collected papers in 2003.

== Family ==
She married fellow doctor Alexandre Roudinesco on November 25, 1928, with whom she had three children, including Élisabeth Roudinesco. In 1953 she remarried to mathematician Pierre Aubry.

Through her mother she was the niece of Alice Anna Weiller (née Javal) and the cousin of Paul-Louis Weiller, the son of Alice and Lazare Weiller.

== Publications ==
- Aubry, Jenny; Roudinesco, Élisabeth (2010). Psychanalyse des enfants séparés : études cliniques (1952-1986). Paris: Flammarion. ISBN 978-2-207-25480-6.*
- Aubry, Jenny (1983). Enfance abandonnée. La carence de soins maternels. Paris: Scarabee and Cie. ISBN 2-86722-005-X.

== See also ==
- D. W. Winnicott
- Francoise Dolto
- Maud Mannoni
