= Clovis Vincent =

French neurologist (1879–1947)

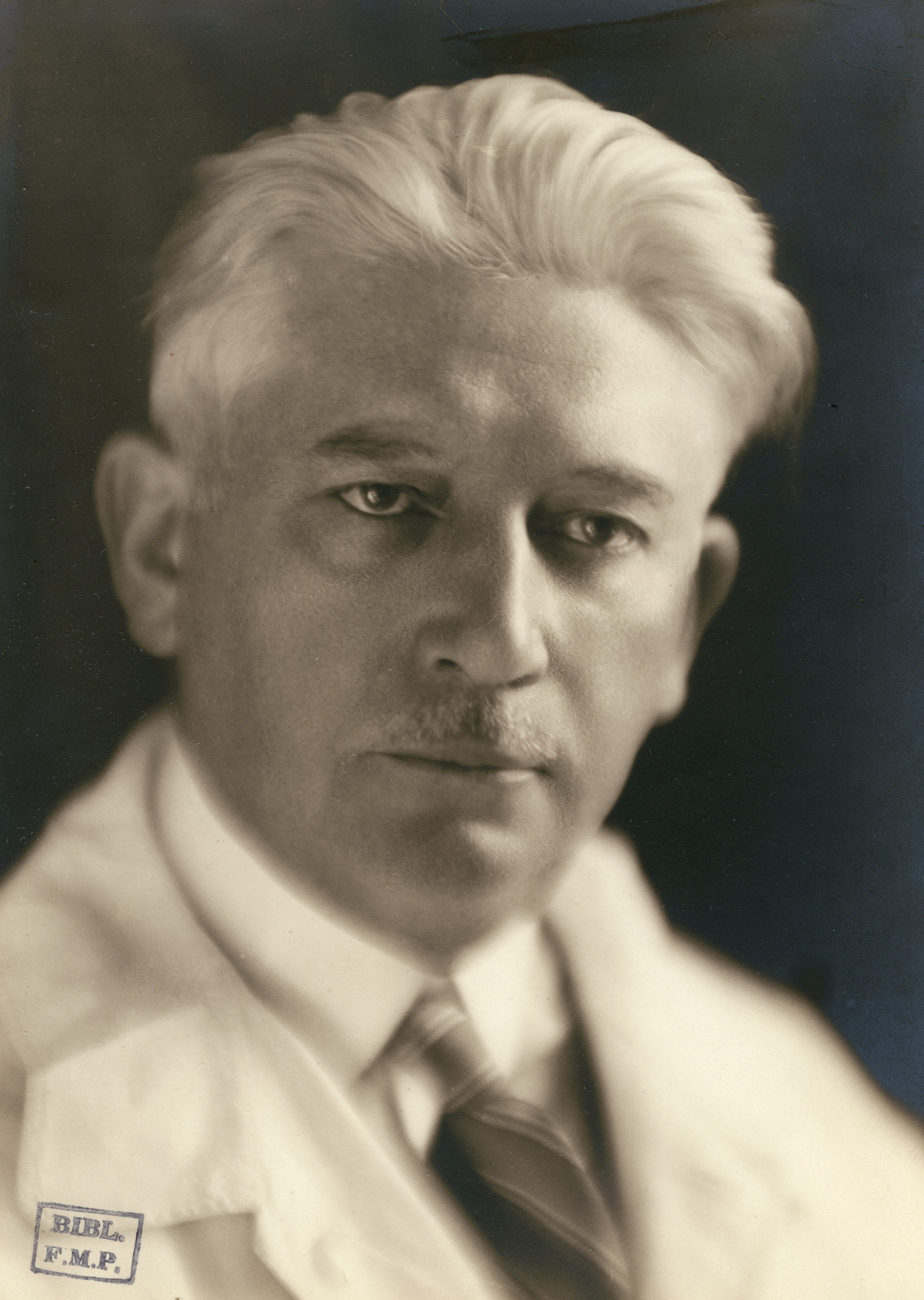
Clovis Vincent (1927)

Clovis Vincent (26 September 1879 – 14 November 1947) was a French neurologist and neurosurgeon. With Thierry de Martel (1875–1940), he was one of the founders of neurosurgery in France.

== Education ==
Clovis Vincent was a student of Professor Fulgence Raymond, Charcot's successor, and had a great admiration for Joseph Babinski. In 1910, he defended his doctoral thesis on chronic syphilitic meningitis before Professors Anatole Chauffard, André Broca and Henri Claude.

== Career ==
Clovis Vincent became a physician at the Greater Paris University Hospitals in 1913.

=== First World War ===
In 1914, when the First World War broke out, he served as a 2nd class Doctor adjutant in a stretcher bearers corps assigned to the 46th Infantry Regiment. In February 1915, he participated in the Battle of Vauquois (Meuse department, Lorraine, north-eastern France). He received the Legion of Honor as a soldier and the Military Medal in 1915.

He was appointed chief physician of the neurological center of the ninth French military region, located in the buildings of the Descartes high school in Tours. There, he fostered a new treatment to get soldiers with shell shock back to the front. Soldiers afflicted with shell shock, suffering from what is now called post-traumatic stress disorder, were, according to Babinsky's terminology, described as "pithiatic": without any organic lesions, the psychologically paralyzed and crushed were considered merely malingerers unaware of their condition. To treat them, Clovis Vincent developed a "faradic treatment," more commonly known as "torpedoing". 60 mA to 100 mA electric shocks were inflicted on the victims.

This practice, later described as "torture," proved very popular with the military authorities, who wanted to implement it in all other centers: only the neurological centers in Lyon and Montpellier, respectively directed by Doctors Paul Auguste Sollier and Joseph Grasset, refused to use it. To demonstrate the method's effectiveness, the Army Photographic and Cinematographic Section (SPCA) produced a film entitled: Les progrès de la science française au profit des victimes de la guerre, une grande découverte du docteur Vincent (tr. "The Progress of French Science for the Benefit of War Victims, a Great Discovery by Doctor Vincent").

=== The Case of Zouave Deschamps ===
On May 27, 1916, during a "torpedoing" treatment, a Zouave, Baptiste Deschamps, repeatedly struck Clovis Vincent, breaking his nose. Clovis Vincent retaliated and beat the soldier: this episode earned him the nickname "médecin-boxeur" ("the boxer-doctor"). A sensational trial ensued, convened on 1 August 1916, at the Tours court-martial, which the press reported in these terms: "Can a soldier refuse medical treatment?". The lawyer Paul Meunier defended Deschamps. Dr. Eugène Doyen testified against the practice of torpedoing. Baptiste Deschamps was ultimately sentenced to six months' imprisonment, suspended. However, in its judgment, the court specified that "Mr. Clovis Vincent was wrong to torpedo Deschamps with violence." Paul Meunier was satisfied: "We can rest easy now; Deschamps will not be torpedoed, and thanks to him, no other wounded soldier will ever be torpedoed again, at least not against his will."

Disavowed, Clovis Vincent asked to return to the front: he was assigned as chief medical officer to the 44th Chasseurs à Pied Battalion, then to the 98th Infantry Regiment, and participated in the Battle of Hill 304 and the Battle of Mort-Homme in August 1917.

In 1928, in a text commemorating The fiftieth anniversary of hysteria, André Breton referred to this affair: "Where are the Zouaves torpedoed by the Raymond Roussel of science, Clovis Vincent?"

=== Inter-war years ===
In 1927, he went to Boston to see Harvey Cushing, a pioneer in neurosurgery.

On 19 December 1937, in Paris, Clovis Vincent tried surgery on the brain of Maurice Ravel, based on the hypothesis of a tumor. The composer woke up a short time after surgery, then plunged into a definitive coma, dying a few hours later.

=== The Resistance ===
On 14 June 1940, during the entry of German troops into Paris, while his former collaborator Thierry de Martel committed suicide, "he went down into the street, rifle in hand."

From 1942, with Robert Debré and Paul Milliez, he collaborated in setting up the Medical Committee of the Resistance (CMR), which was chaired by Professor Louis Pasteur Vallery-Radot.

Clovis Vincent was the godfather of the historian and psychoanalyst Élisabeth Roudinesco: her mother, Jenny Roudinesco, a member of the Medical Committee of the Resistance, had been his intern.

== Death ==
Clovis Vincent died on 14 November 1947 in the 13th arrondissement of Paris.
