= Élisabeth Roudinesco =

French historian (born 1944)

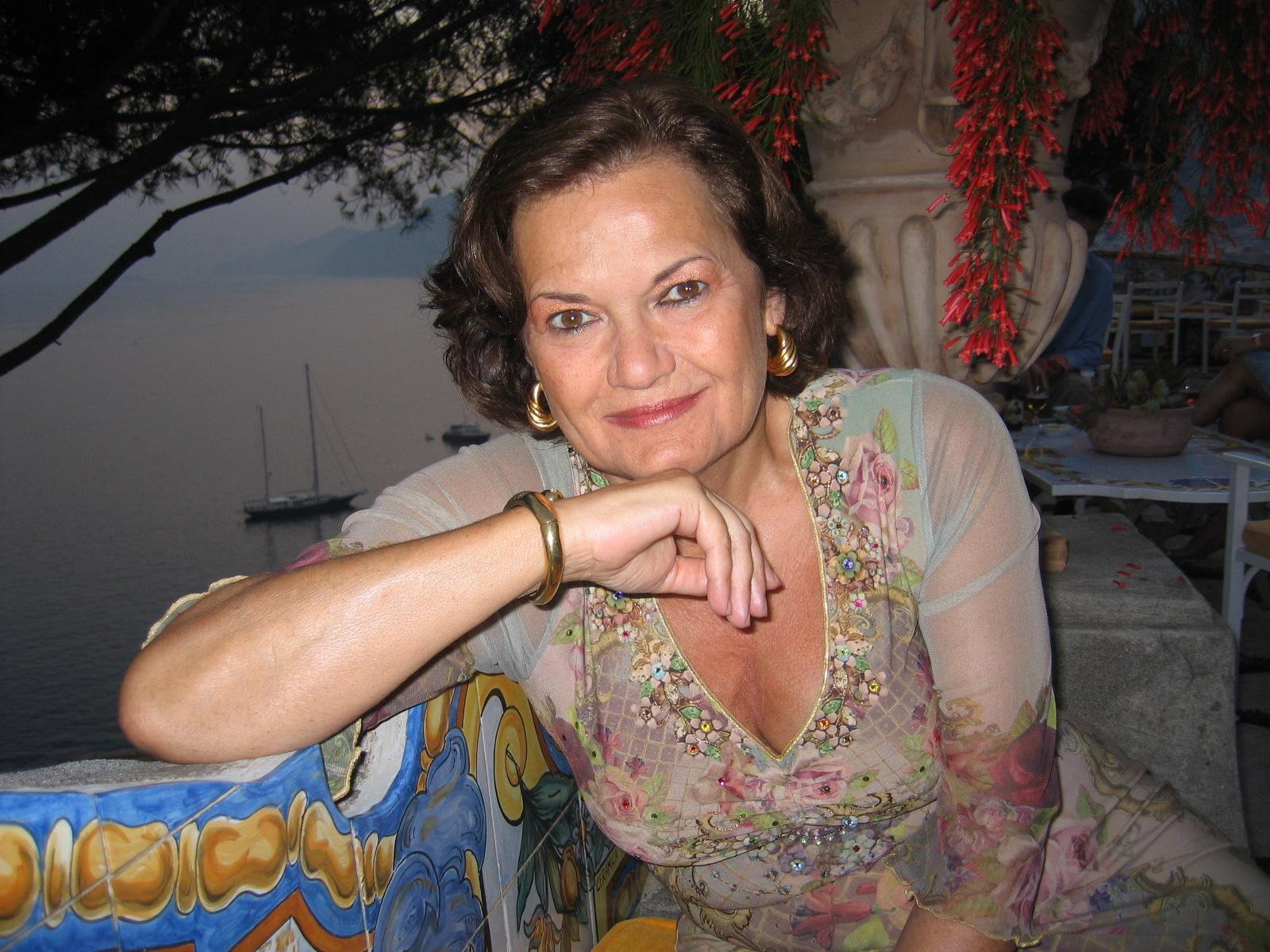
- Roudinesco in 2007
- Born: September 10, 1944 (age 81); Paris, France
- Education: University of Paris; University of Paris VIII
- Parents: Alexandre Roudinesco (father); Jenny Aubry (mother)
- Awards: Prix Décembre
- Scientific career
- Fields: Historian; Psychoanalyst
- Workplaces: École normale supérieure Paris Diderot University; School for Advanced Studies in the Social Sciences
- Thesis: Inscription du désir et roman du sujet (1975)
- Doctoral advisor: Jean Levaillant
- Other academic advisors: Tzvetan Todorov

Élisabeth Roudinesco (French: [ʁudinɛsko]; born 10 September 1944) is a French scholar, historian and psychoanalyst. She conducts a seminar on the history of psychoanalysis at the École Normale Supérieure.

Roudinesco's work focuses mainly on psychiatry, psychology and psychoanalysis in France but also worldwide. She has written biographies of Jacques Lacan and Sigmund Freud. Her biography of Freud, Freud, In his Time and Ours, was awarded the "Prix Décembre" 2014 and The "Prix des Prix" 2014. With Michel Plon, she published a huge Dictionary of Psychoanalysis (7th édition in 2023), which was translated into many languages, though not yet into English. Her book Généalogies (also unpublished in English) was awarded The Best Book Prize by The Société française d'histoire de la médecine. Her work has been translated into thirty languages.

== Life ==
Roudinesco was born to half-Jewish parents in newly liberated Paris in September 1944, and grew up there. Her mother was Jenny Aubry, née Weiss, a daughter of the Judeo-Protestant bourgeoise, a renowned psychoanalyst and hospital neuro-paediatrician who spent her whole life looking after suffering children: abandoned, ill and in difficulty. She was an anglophile who, in the 1950s, introduced to France John Bowlby's theories on the importance of maternal care, and she worked in collaboration with the Tavistock Clinic in London. She was a friend of Jacques Lacan, and her sister was the feminist Louise Weiss, of the Javal family. Roudinesco's father was physician Alexandre Roudinesco, of Romanian origin, who had "a passion for history and a phenomenal library". He was born in Bucharest in a Jewish and francophile milieu, and his father had been an editor.

She received her secondary education in Paris at the Collège Sévigné. She studied Literature at the Sorbonne, with a minor in Linguistics; her master's degree was supervised by Tzvetan Todorov, and her doctoral thesis, entitled Inscription du désir et roman du sujet [Inscription of the desire and novel of the subject], by Jean Levaillant at the University of Paris VIII in 1975.

She also took classes with Michel de Certeau, Gilles Deleuze and Michel Foucault at the time of her master's degree. She next defended her "habilitation à diriger des recherches" (H.D.R – the French accreditation needed to supervise doctoral dissertations) in 1991 with Michelle Perrot as supervisor and Alain Corbin, Dominique Lecourt, Jean-Claude Passeron, Robert Castel, and Serge Leclaire as members of the examining committee. This work was published under the title Généalogies.

From 1969 to 1981, she was a member of the École Freudienne de Paris, founded by psychoanalyst and philosopher Jacques Lacan. She was also a member of the editorial board of Action Poétique (1969–1979). She has written for French national newspapers, Libération (1986–1996), and then Le Monde since 1996.

For the past 30 years, she has been married to Olivier Bétourné, CEO of Éditions du Seuil.

== Methodology ==
=== Literary ===
In the 1970s, Elisabeth Roudinesco's first works dealt with literary criticism, notably with Raymond Roussel, Antonin Artaud, Bertolt Brecht and Louis-Ferdinand Céline. At that time, her work concerned linking a singular trajectory and an author's work, without resorting to psycho-biography, in other words, the psychologization of literary work by the clinical study of its author. This approach allowed her to demonstrate that most of 20th century literature has been influenced by the history of Freudianism and psychological medicine based on the theory of degeneration.

=== History of psychoanalysis in France ===
From 1979, Elisabeth Roudinesco writes a history of psychoanalysis in France. At that time, the main model was still the biography, because the archives and documents of the psychoanalytical movement were still in the hand of Freud's heirs.

Indeed, this model corresponded to the historiographical trend centered on the notion of the founding father figure; a trend which is at the core of any quest of origins. However, this model has gradually declined.

Considering how psychoanalysis was established as a movement and system of thought, Elisabeth Roudinesco asserted that France was the only country where all the necessary conditions were gathered together, over a long period of time, to successfully establish Freudianism in scientific and cultural life. According to Elisabeth Roudinesco, this favorable situation dated back first to the French Revolution of 1789 which provided a scientific and legal legitimacy to reason, heed/gaze over madness, giving birth to the institution of the asylum. Then, the Dreyfus affair, which has precipitated the arrival of intellectuals' self-awareness as a class. Designating themselves as an 'avant-garde', they furnished fruitful and innovative ideas. Finally, the emergence of literary modernity with Baudelaire, Rimbaud and Lautréamont, who enunciate, in a new style of writing, the project of changing man through "I is another".

==== Ellenberger ====
Scholarly historiography emerged with such work as Henri Ellenberger's The Discovery of the Unconscious: The History and Evolution of Dynamic Psychiatry, first published in 1970. Though this book had been known in English-speaking countries since that date, the book (published in French in 1974) remained largely unnoticed in France. Elisabeth Roudinesco republished it with a lengthy new preface in 1994.

In his work, Ellenberger developed a conceptuality of freudianism founded on archivistics and reference to the concepts of "mental tools", "long length" and "system of thought". This last category proposed presenting doctrines in their own terms and structures. The study of the system of thought of dynamic psychiatry, psychotherapies and psychological medicine no longer echoes back to a single founder, but to a plurality of singular itineraries, shattering the biographic model.

From Ellenberger's thesis, Elisabeth Roudinesco retained several guiding principles, while adding methodology derived from the works of the French epistemological school: Georges Canguilhem and Michel Foucault. Thus, the study of system of thought becomes the form in which, at a given time, knowledge achieves independence, finding balance and entering into communication: a history of a man who thinks, systems which intertwine, but also a critical analysis of the concepts of consciousness and subject of knowledge.

=== Lacan ===
In 1993, Elisabeth Roudinesco published a biography of French psychoanalyst Jacques Lacan. Roudinesco highlighted the fact that the genius of Lacan's work is the introduction of elements from German philosophy (e.g., Nietzsche, Hegel, Heidegger) within the Freudian doctrine – creating a phenomenon Freud would have never conceived himself, since he built his theory on a biological model (darwinism), by consciously refusing to consider and include any philosophical discourses, contemporary or ancient, in his thought process.

=== Théroigne de Mericourt ===
From the study of the melancholic Théroigne de Mericourt (1989), early feminist and famous case of the annals of French alienism – she has been 'gazed' by Jean-Étienne Esquirol in La Salpêtrière – Roudinesco think the French Revolution is a paradigm in the French situation of Freudianism. For Roudinesco, it was necessary to include the analysis of patients into the analysis of doctrines as a major constituting element of the discourses of psychopathology.

=== Freudianism and politics ===
Roudinesco posits several invariant conditions required to introduce Freudian ideas and establish a psychoanalytical movement in a given space. First, some psychiatric knowledge must have been previously established, encompassing but not limited to; a conceptual understanding of mental illness and related biological and experiential contributing factors rather than explaining it as divine and/or demonic possession or other traditional explanations. Secondly, the existence of a rule of law capable of guaranteeing the free practice of transmission {incomplete sentence}.

Her claim is that; whenever one or both of these elements are lacking, it helps explain why the establishment of Freudianism has not been possible (ex., the area of the world influenced by Islam and/or regions where the governmental organizational structure is primarily tribal). She also asserts that psychoanalytical movements disappear under totalitarian regimes, aka nazism and communism. She noted that military dictatorships in South America (notably Brazil and Argentina) didn't attempt to utilize government authority to halt the expansion of psychoanalysis. Roudinesco assesses that caudillo regimes didn't try to eradicate psychoanalysis as a "Jewish science" as did Nazism in the years 1933–1944 nor as a "bourgeois science" as did communism over the period 1945–1989.

== Positions ==
Since 1997, she has expressed her opinions on various subjects. She talked about subjects such as laicity, cloning, and genetics. She fiercely criticized INSERM's reports of experts over psychotherapies, as the reports were critical of psychoanalysis.

== Bibliography ==
Her book, a biography of Sigmund Freud, has been awarded the Prix Decembre 2014 and then, the Prix des Prix 2014. Professor Emeritus of Psychology (Université catholique de Louvain) Jacques Van Rillaer has produced a critical review of this book.

Available in English

- Jacques Lacan & Co.: A History of Psychoanalysis in France, 1925–1985, 1990, Chicago, Chicago University Press
- Madness and Revolution: The Lives and Legends of Theroigne De Mericourt, 1993, Verso.
- Jacques Lacan, 1997, New York, Columbia University Press. Jacques Lacan: Outline of a Life, History of a System of Thought, 1999. Cambridge, UK, Polity Press
- Why Psychoanalysis?, 2001, New York, Columbia University Press (European Perspectives: A Series in Social Thought and Cultural Criticism)
- "The Mirror Stage: An Obliterated Archive" in The Cambridge Companion to Lacan, Jean-Michel Rabaté dir., 2003, Cambridge, Cambridge University Press.
- For What Tomorrow... : A Dialogue with Jacques Derrida, 2004, Palo Alto, Stanford University Press.
- "Psychoanalysis" in The Columbia History of Twentieth-Century French Thought, Lawrence D. Kriztman dir., 2006, New York, Columbia University Press.
- Philosophy in Turbulent Times: Canguilhem, Sartre, Foucault, Althusser, Deleuze, Derrida, 2008, New York, Columbia University Press.
- « Lacan, The Plague », Psychoanalysis and History, ed. John Forrester, Teddington, Artesian Books, 2008.
- "Humanity and Its Gods: Atheism", in Psychoanalysis, Fascism, and Fundamentalism, ed. Julia Borossa and Ivan Ward, Vol. 11, no. 2, 2009, Edinburgh, Edinburgh University Press.
- Our Dark Side: A History of Perversion, Cambridge, Polity Press, 2009.
- Revisiting the Jewish Question, Cambridge, Polity Press, 2013.
- Lacan: In Spite of Everything, London, Verso Books, 2014.
- Lacan, Past and Present: A Dialogue (with philosopher Alain Badiou), New York, Columbia University Press, 2014.
- Freud: In His Time and Ours, Cambridge, Harvard University Press, 2016.

Available in French

- Initiation à la linguistique générale, 1967, Paris, L'Expansion scientifique française.
- Un Discours au réel : théorie de l'inconscient et politique de la psychanalyse, 1973, Tours, Mame.
- L'Inconscient et ses lettres, 1975, Tours, Mame.
- Pour une politique de la psychanalyse, 1977, Paris, La Découverte.
- La Psychanalyse mère et chienne, avec H.Deluy, 1979, Paris, Union Générale d'Editions.
- Théroigne de Méricourt. Une femme mélancolique sous la Révolution, 1989, Paris, Le Seuil.
- Jacques Lacan. Esquisse d'une vie, histoire d'un système de pensée, 1993, Paris, Fayard.
- Histoire de la psychanalyse en France, vol.1, 1994, Paris, Fayard.
- Histoire de la psychanalyse en France, vol.2, 1994, Paris, Fayard.
- Généalogies, 1994, Paris, Fayard.
- Dictionnaire de la psychanalyse, avec Michel Plon, 1997, Paris, Fayard.
- Pourquoi la psychanalyse?, 1999, Paris, Fayard.
- Au-delà du conscient : histoire illustrée de la psychiatrie et de la psychanalyse, avec J.P. Bourgeron et P.Morel, 2000, Paris, Hazan.
- L'Analyse, l'archive, 2001, Paris, Bibliothèque Nationale de France.
- La Famille en désordre, 2002, Paris, Fayard.
- Le Patient, le thérapeute et l'État, 2004, Paris, Fayard.
- Philosophes dans la tourmente, 2005, Paris, Fayard.
- La part obscure de nous-mêmes – Une histoire des pervers, Albin Michel, Paris, 2007.
- Retour sur la question juive, Albin Michel, Paris, 2009.

== See also ==
- Javal family
- Henri Ellenberger
- Paul Roazen
