= Louise Weiss =

French author, journalist, feminist activist and European politician

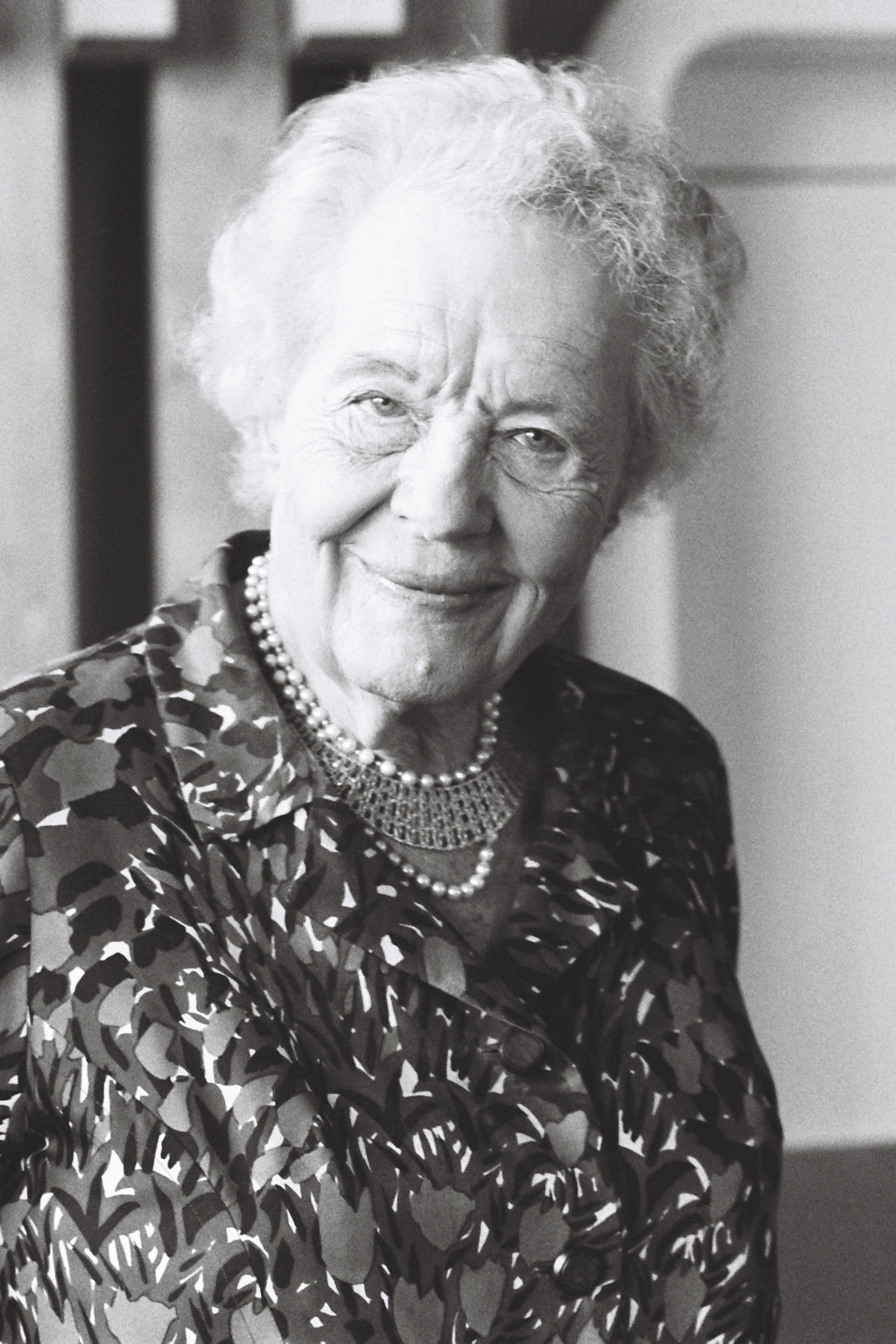
- Weiss in 1980

Member of the European Parliament for France
- In office 17 July 1979 – 26 May 1983
- Preceded by: Constituency established
- Succeeded by: Hugues Tatilon

Personal details
- Born: 25 January 1893 Arras, France
- Died: 26 May 1983 (aged 90) Paris, France
- Parent(s): Paul Louis Weiss; Jeanne Félicie Javal
- Relatives: Fanny Dombre-Coste (cousin)
- Occupation: Politician, journalist and author
- Known for: Being an early pro-European feminist

Louise Weiss (25 January 1893 – 26 May 1983) was a French author, journalist, feminist, and European politician. She was nominated for the Nobel Peace Prize in 1971 and for the Nobel Prize in Literature in 1974.

== Life ==
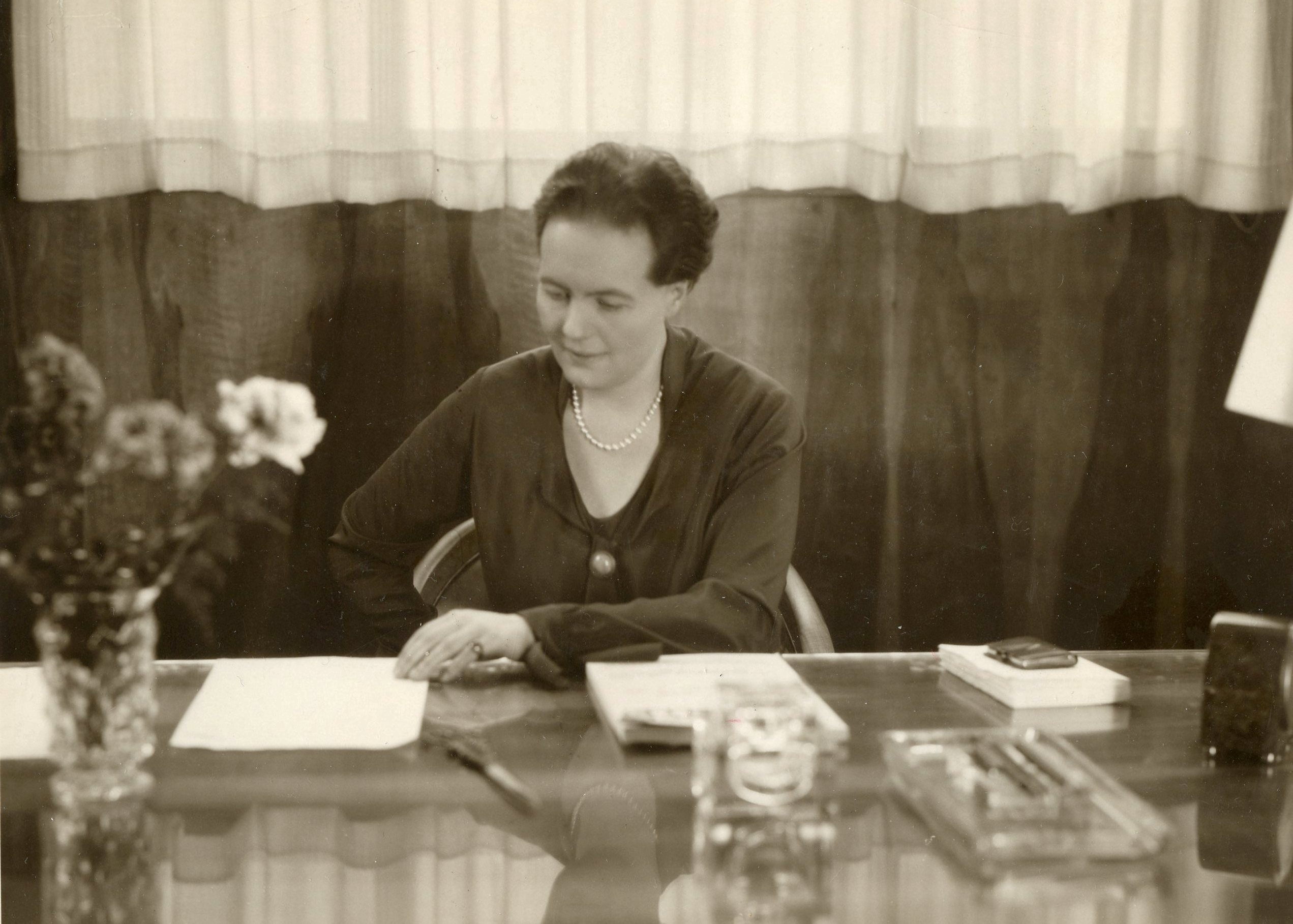
Louise Weiss at her desk

Born in Arras, Pas-de-Calais, Louise Weiss came from a cosmopolitan family of Alsace. Her father, Paul Louis Weiss (1867-1945), a mining engineer, was a distinguished Alsatian Protestant from La Petite-Pierre. The ancestors of her Jewish mother, Jeanne Félicie Javal (1871-1956), originated from the small Alsatian town of Seppois-le-Bas. Her maternal grandfather was Louis Émile Javal. Through her mother, she was the niece of Alice Weiller (née Javal) and the cousin of Paul-Louis Weiller, the son of Alice and Lazare Weiller. One of her siblings was Jenny Aubry. She grew up in Paris with five siblings, was trained as a teacher against the will of her family, was a teacher at a secondary school for arts and was awarded a degree from Oxford University. From 1914 to 1918, she worked as a war nurse and founded a hospital in the Côtes-du-Nord. From 1918 to 1934, she was the magazine publisher, L'Europe nouvelle. From 1935 to the beginning of World War II, she committed herself to women's suffrage. In 1936, she stood for French parliamentary elections, running in the Fifth arrondissement of Paris. She was active in the French Resistance during the War. She claimed she was a member of the Patriam Recuperare network; however, this was formally denied by network members. She was chief editor of the secret magazine, "Nouvelle République" from 1942 until 1944. In 1945, she founded the Institute for Polemology (research on war and conflict) together with Gaston Bouthoul in London. She travelled around the Middle East, Japan, China, Vietnam, Africa, Kenya, Madagascar, Alaska, India, etc., made documentary films and wrote accounts of her travels. In 1975, she unsuccessfully tried twice to be admitted to the Académie Française. In 1979, she became a Member of the European Parliament for the Gaullist Party (now The Republicans).

She died on 26 May 1983 in Paris.

== Journalist ==
During World War I, she published her first press reports under a pseudonym. In Paris, she came in contact with her first great loves, representatives of countries striving for independence, such as Eduard Beneš, Tomáš Masaryk and Milan Štefánik. Between 1919 and 1939, she often travelled to Czechoslovakia. In 1918, she founded the weekly newspaper, Europe nouvelle (New Europe), which she published in 1934. Thomas Mann, Gustav Stresemann, Rudolf Breitscheid and Aristide Briand were among her co-authors on the paper. Louise Weiss described those who paved the way for the closening of the German-French relationship between the World Wars as "peace pilgrims", and they called their important co-worker "my good Louise". Europe dreamed of unification and in 1930, she founded the "École de la Paix" (School of Peace), a private institute for international relations. As in many other areas her efforts for peace and unification were well meant but weak and bore no results.

== Women's rights activist ==
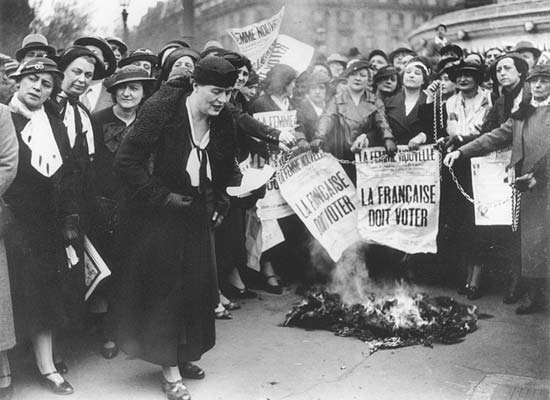
Weiss (front) along with other suffragettes at the Bastille in Paris in 1935

In 1934, she founded the association Les femmes nouvelles (The New Women) with Cécile Brunschvicg, and she strove for a stronger role for women in public life. She participated in campaigns for the right of women to vote in France, organised suffragette commands, demonstrated and had herself chained to a street light in Paris with other women. In 1935, she unsuccessfully sued against the "inability of women to vote" before the French Conseil d'État.

== Politician ==
In 1979, she, a Gaullist, stood as a candidate of the Rassemblement pour la République in the first European election in 1979. On 17 July 1979, she was elected as a French Member of the European Parliament (MEP) and sat with the European People's Party. At the time of the first election, aged 86, she was the oldest member of Parliament and thus its first Oldest Member. She remained MEP and Oldest Member until her death, on 26 May 1983, aged 90.

The main parliament building in Strasbourg bears her name.

== Louise Weiss Museum ==
A section of the municipal museum of Saverne is dedicated to the life and work of Louise Weiss. It displays the collection of 600 items she bequeathed to the town in 1981 and 1983, as well as historical documents relating to her career.

== Works ==
=== Political works ===
- La République Tchécoslovaque, 1919
- Milan Stefanik, Prague 1920

=== Biographies ===
- Souvenirs d'une enfance républicaine, Paris, 1937
- Ce que femme veut, Paris, 1946
- Mémoires d'une Européenne, Paris 1968-1976

=== Novels ===
- Délivrance, Paris 1936
- La Marseillaise, Vol. I and II Paris, 1945; Vol. III Paris 1947
- Sabine Legrand, Paris 1951
- Dernières Voluptés, Paris, 1979

=== Theatrical works ===
- Arthur ou les joies du suicide
- Sigmaringen ou les potentats du néant
- Le récipiendaire
- La patronne
- Adaptation des Dernières Voluptés

=== Travel books ===
- L'or, le camion et la croix, Paris, 1949
- Le voyage enchanté, Paris, 1960
- Le Cachemire, Les Albums des Guides Bleus, Paris, 1955

=== Sociological essay ===
- Lettre à un embryon, Paris 1973

=== Art, Archaeology and Folklore ===
- Contes et légendes du Grand-Nord, Paris, 1957

== Honours ==
- The main building of the European Parliament in Strasbourg bears her name.
- A street in the 13th arrondissement in Paris is named for her.
- A primary school built by Fritz Beblo in Strasbourg-Neudorf now bears her name.
- Honorary member of the Upper University Council in Strasbourg.
- Winner of the Robert Schuman Prize
- Grand Officer of the Legion of Honor
- Officer of the Order of the White Lion, 1924

== Foundation ==
Each year, the Louise Weiss Foundation awards a prize to the author or the institution which has contributed the most to the advancement of the science of peace, the improvement of human relations and efforts of benefit to Europe.

== Literature ==
Florence Hervé: Frauengeschichten - Frauengesichter, Vol. 4, trafo verlag 2003, 150 pp., illustrated, ISBN 3-89626-423-0
