= Javal family =

The Javal family were a Jewish family originating in Alsace. They benefited from Napoleon Bonaparte's policy of openness toward Jews, and in the 19th century experienced an ascent, with family members becoming bankers, industrialists, physicians, public officials and artists.

The Javal were a family rooted for many generations in Paris and Europe for over a century in the Industrial Revolution. This family produced bankers, captains of industry, professors of medicine, high civil servants, members of parliament, and artists.

The Javal family, writes Pierre Birnbaum, had experienced financial success. Beginning in the late 18th century, they were involved in industries ranging from railways to textiles and established links with the business world. Operating within an international industrial network, they began financial operations in the early 19th century, acquiring wealth that placed them within the social elite.

== Early history ==
The group was led by two Javal brothers (both named Jacques, and called respectively Jacques Javal the Elder and Jacque Javal the Younger) whom operated a mill in Mulhouse.

In 1826, Jacques Javal the Younger entered the Board of Manufacturers. In 1828 he was made a Knight of the Legion of Honor, under its industrial activity on the proposal of Count Chabrol de Volvic, prefect of the Seine. He built a mansion at the bottom of rue Taitbout while his son and partner, Joseph, settled on Rue Chauchat. When Jacques the Younger retired in 1835, he was one of France's richest men.

== Leopold Javal ==
Jacques the Younger sponsored Leopold, then 31 years old, to invest in new businesses. Leopold invested in mines in Provence, in pipeline companies, a department store, a public bathhouse on the Seine at the foot of the Samaritaine, a housing neighbourhood for workers in Montrouge. In ten years, he multiplied by three the capital of the family companies and created his own personal fortune. He took control of the banking side of the family empire and renamed it "Leopold Javal and C i.e. "and took the lead. Through this bank, it invests in the development of railway lines, in combination with the house Koechlin.

He also took up a political career as general counsel of the Gironde from 1851, with the support of the imperial regime, and as a representative of the department of the Yonne to the Legislature from 1857, where he appeared first as a Republican against the Bonapartist candidate, and was consistently re-elected in 1863, 1869 and 1871. In 1862, he was made an Officier de la Legion d'honneur. He lived at the end of his life, an hotel particulier of rue d'Anjou, and started the very important Javal art collection with paintings of François Boucher, Claude Joseph Vernet, Canaletto, Andrea del Sarto, Bruegel and Rubens.

In 1838, Javal married Augusta von Laemel, daughter of the financier Léopold von Laemel and the Baroness Sophia von Eichthal, sister of the Baron Simon von Eichthal, a member of one of the Deux cents familles, the two hundred families that were the biggest shareholders in the Bank of France, a family which gave several governors to the Bank of France.

Being heavily influenced by Saint-Simonism, Javal began by planting pine forests and drilling wells. The Javal family owned some 300 hectares around the cistercian abbey of Vauluisant, while in Andernos Javal enlarged an estate at Audenge to Ares and to Lacanau, thus forming a big property of over 3,000 hectares.

== Houbigant ==
The Javal owned the perfume house Houbigant, the second oldest perfume house in Europe. Operating since 1775, the House of Houbigant is the only fragrance house that has existed through four centuries of history. Through these centuries, the perfumers of the House of Houbigant have made discoveries in the formulation of perfumes.

Over the centuries, the House of Houbigant became perfumer to the royal courts of Europe. When in 1793 Marie-Antoinette was guillotined, she carried three vials of Houbigant perfume in her corsage to give her strength. Josephine, the future Empress of France, belonged to a group of stylish young men and women called "The Muscadins" because of their craze for musk which was Josephine's favourite essence. Houbigant fragrances travelled in Napoleon's campaign chest during the years when he was conquering Europe. In the spring of 1815 Napoleon was only in Paris for three months, a period known as the "Hundred Days". In those brief months he raised an army and yet found time to shop at Houbigant.

In 1829, Houbigant was appointed perfumer to Her Royal Highness, the Princess Adelaide d'Orleans, mother of King Louis-Philippe. In 1838, the French house was awarded the license of "Perfumer to Her Majesty, Queen Victoria of the United Kingdom". Czar Alexander III named Houbigant perfumer to the Imperial Court of Russia in 1890. Houbigant created a perfume, "The Czarina's Bouquet", in honor of the Empress, Maria Fyodorovna. When her son ascended the throne as Czar Nicolas II in 1894, Houbigant continued as royal perfumer. Hand-written ledgers record the purchases of the Dowager Empress from 1900 until the eve of the Russian Revolution in 1917. Her sister, Queen Alexandra, wife of King Edward VII, began her purchases in 1902. The account books reveal that the two queens did their Christmas shopping together at Houbigant. Other royalty luminaries include La Comtesse de Saxe, first cousin of Louis XVI the King and Queen of Holland; the Queen of Italy; Princess Mathilde, sister of Napoleon, Prince of Battenberg; Le Duc de Mouchy; Tolstoy; the Russian Ambassador; Guy de Maupassant; the Rothschilds and more.

In 1882, the famous Fougère Royale came out, a fragrance that would define a new category of perfumes – the "fougère" (or fern-like) fragrance family, which is still today the most popular family in men fragrances. In 1912, Houbigant perfumer Bienaimé picked up the ball from Paul Parquet and introduced Quelque Fleurs, the first multi-floral bouquet ever created. During the same period, Houbigant stretched out its commercial arms around the world. Under the direction of the Paris office, offices were established in the United States, England, Belgium, Holland, Switzerland, Italy, Spain, Poland, Romania. Connections were made in Havana, Buenos-Aires, Rio-de-Janeiro, Australia, Japan, and China.

== The Weiller ==
With the Weiller branch (Paul-Louis Weiller, son of industrialist and politician Lazare Weiller (1858–1928) and Alice Javal, the first woman to ever pilot an airplane), they conducted a social life between the royal families of Europe and the men of political affairs ( Aristotle Onassis, Henry Ford, Jean Paul Getty, Richard Nixon, Georges Pompidou ). Paul-Louis Weiller also funded many charities.

Captain of industry at the age of twenty-nine years, from 1922 to 1940, Paul-Louis Weiller developed the largest construction company of aircraft in Europe, the Gnome et Rhône conglomerate, which became the Snecma after nationalization in 1945 . From 1925, he gradually buys the capital of the airline CIDNA. He participated in the creation of other airlines to Africa. They were nationalized in 1933 to become Air France, of which he became one of the first directors (he was offered in 1933 by Pierre Cot, the Ministre de l'Air, to be President of Air France, but he refused).

Paul-Louis Weiller was married 29 August 1922 in Paris, with Princess Alexandra Ghica (of the ruling princes of Wallachia and Moldavia) with whom he had a daughter, Mary Elizabeth and whom he divorced in 1931.

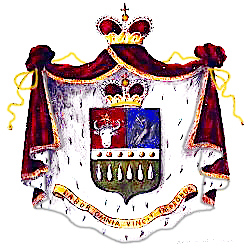
Coat of Arms of the Ghica family

He married second wife Aliki Diplarakou, Miss Europe in 1930. Aliki was the daughter of a diplomat Georgios Diplarakos. She had three sisters, Nada Diplarakos who married French Ambassador André Rodocanachi, Cristina Diplarakos, who married Henri Claudel, a son of the French poet Paul Claudel. Aliki second marriage was in 1945 with Sir John (Jack) Wriothesley Russell (23 August 1914 – 3 August 1984), an English aristocrat who was descended from John Russell, 6th Duke of Bedford and cousin of the philosopher Bertrand Russell.

They had a son Paul-Annik Weiller (1933–1998) who married in Rome, in Santa Maria in Trastevere in 1965, Emmanuela Donna Olimpia a Torlonia di Civitella-Cesi. She was the daughter of

- Don Alessandro Torlonia, 5th Prince of Civitella-Cesi
  Arms of Don Alessandro Torlonia, 5th Prince di Civitella-Cesi.
  (Don Alessandro's youngest sister was Donna Marina Torlonia di Civitella-Cesi, grandmother of the American actress Brooke Shields. He was also a first cousin of Bettine Moore, the mother of the actress Glenn Close)
- the Infante Beatriz of Spain(granddaughter of the King of Spain Alfonso XIII and his wife Princess Victoria Eugenie of Battenberg, grandmother of Juan Carlos I of Spain and grand daughter of Queen Victoria, the first cousin of King George V of the United Kingdom, Queen Maud of Norway, Empress Alexandra Feodorovna of Russia, Queen Marie of Romania, Emperor Wilhelm II of Germany, Queen Louise of Sweden, and Queen Sophia of the Hellenes )

Arms of Infanta Beatriz of Spain.

The daughter of Paul-Annik, Sibilla Weiller married in 1994 Prince Guillaume of Luxembourg, Prince of Nassau and Parma, youngest son of Grand Duke Jean of Luxembourg (descendants and heirs of the House of Nassau-Weilburg, agnatically, now a cadet branch of the House of Bourbon-Parma, itself a cadet branch of the House of Capet)

== Louise Weiss ==
Louise Weiss (1893, Arras, Pas-de-Calais - 26 May 1983, Paris) was the daughter of Jeanne Javal (a daughter of Louis Émile Javal) and Paul Weiss. She became an author, journalist, feminist and European politician. She was awarded a degree from Oxford University. From 1914 to 1918, she worked as a war nurse and founded a hospital in the Côtes-du-Nord. From 1918 to 1934, she was the publisher of the magazine, L'Europe nouvelle. From 1935 to the beginning of World War II, she committed herself to women's suffrage. In 1936, she stood for French parliamentary elections, running in the Fifth arrondissement of Paris. During the War, she was active in the French Resistance. She was a member of the Patriam Recuperare network, and she was chief editor of the secret magazine, "Nouvelle République" from 1942 until 1944. In 1945, she founded the Institute for Polemology (research on war and conflict) together with Gaston Bouthoul in London. She travelled around the Middle East, Japan, China, Vietnam, Africa, Kenya, Madagascar, Alaska, India, etc., made documentary films and wrote accounts of her travels. In 1975, she unsuccessfully tried twice to be admitted to the Académie Française. In 1979, she became a Member of the European Parliament for the Gaullist Party (now Union for a Popular Movement).

During World War I, she published her first press reports under a pseudonym. In Paris, she came in contact with her first great loves, representatives of countries striving for independence, such as Eduard Beneš, Tomáš Masaryk and Milan Štefánik. Between 1919 and 1939, she often travelled to Czechoslovakia. In 1918, she founded the weekly newspaper, Europe nouvelle (New Europe), which she published until 1934. Thomas Mann, Gustav Stresemann, Rudolf Breitscheid and Aristide Briand were among her co-authors on the paper. Louise Weiss described those who paved the way for the closening of the German-French relationship between the World Wars as "peace pilgrims", and they called their important co-worker "my good Louise". Europe dreamed of unification and in 1930, she founded the "Ecole de la Paix" (School of Peace), a private institute for international relations. With the takeover by the National Socialists in Germany, the possibility of a unification was over.

In 1979, Louise Weiss stood as a candidate of the Gaullist Party in the first European election in 1979. On 17 July 1979 she was elected as a French Member of the European Parliament (MEP), sitting with the European People's Party. At the time of the first election, aged 86, she was the oldest member in Parliament and thus the EP's first 'oldest member'. She remained MEP and oldest member until her death on 26 May 1983, aged 90. The main parliament building in Strasbourg bears her name.

The Women's Rights Activist: In 1934, she founded the association La femme nouvelle (The New Woman) with Cécile Brunsvicg, and she strove for a stronger role of women in public life. She participated in campaigns for the right of women to vote in France, organised suffragette commands, demonstrated and had herself chained to a street light in Paris with other women. In 1935, she unsuccessfully sued against the "inability of women to vote" before the French Conseil d'État.

== André Maurois ==
André Maurois was a famous French writer who in 1938 was elected to the prestigious Académie française. He was encouraged and assisted in seeking this post by Marshal Philippe Pétain, and he made a point of acknowledging with thanks his debt to Pétain in his 1941 autobiography, "Call no man happy" – though by the time of writing their paths had sharply diverged, Pétain having become Head of State of Vichy France.

A student of the philosopher Alain, during World War I he joined the French army and served as an interpreter and later a liaison officer with the British army. His first novel, Les silences du colonel Bramble, was a witty and socially realistic account of that experience. It was an immediate success in France. It was translated and became popular in the United Kingdom and other English-speaking countries as The Silence of Colonel Bramble. Many of his other works have also been translated into English, as they often dealt with British people or topics, such as his biographies of Disraeli, Byron, and Shelley.

When World War II began, he was appointed the French Official Observer attached to the British General Headquarters. In this capacity he accompanied the British Army to Belgium. He knew personally the main politicians in the French Government, and on 10 June 1940 he was sent on a mission to London. The Armistice ended that mission. Maurois was demobilised and travelled from England to Canada. He wrote of these experiences in his book, Tragedy in France.

Maurois's first wife was Jeanne-Marie Wanda de Szymkiewicz, a young Polish-Russian aristocrat who had studied at Oxford University. She had a nervous breakdown in 1918, and in 1924 she died of sepsis. After the death of his father, Maurois gave up the family business of textile manufacturing. Maurois's second wife was Simone de Caillavet, the granddaughter of Anatole France's mistress Léontine Arman de Caillavet. After Germany occupied France the couple moved to the United States to help with propaganda work against the Nazis.

Later in World War II he served in the French army and the Free French Forces. He died in 1967 in Neuilly-sur-Seine after a long career as an author of novels, biographies, histories, children's books and science fiction stories. He is buried in Neuilly-sur-Seine community cemetery near Paris.

== Ricqlès ==
The Javal family established a marriage alliance with the Ricqlès family, another known family. The Ricqlès family is primarily known for founding the famous Ricqlès company, which produced liqueurs and pharmaceutical products, including peppermint alcohol, a tonic remedy created in the 19th century. This beverage played a role in the expansion of the Ricqlès company, which quickly grew internationally. Heyman de Ricqlès, a key figure in the family, saw his daughter marry Armand Schiller, an influential journalist of the Third Republic. Their own daughter later married a member of the Javal family, further strengthening the ties between these two influential dynasties. Notable members of the Ricqlès family also include François de Ricqlès, a renowned auctioneer, and Armand de Ricqlès, a professor of paleontology at the Collège de France.

== Family Tree ==
Cerf Herschel Jacob (became Javal in 1808) (1751–1819), merchant at Seppois-le-Bas
x (1) : Hindel Juda Blum
│
├──> Jacques Javal the Elder
│    x Claire Schöngrun (died in 1822)
│    │
│    └──> Joseph Javal ( -1844)
│         x Julie Javal
│
├──> Jacques Javal the Younger ( -1858)
│    x Lucie Blumenthal
│    │
│    ├──> Julie Javal
│    │    x Joseph Javal ( -1844)
│    │       
│    └──> Léopold Javal (1804–1872), banker, agronomist, republican deputy of Yonne
│         x (22 July 1838) Augusta de Laemel (1817–1893) (daughter of Leopold von Laemel and Sophia d'Eichtal)
│         │
│         ├──> Louis Émile Javal (1839–1907), ophthalmologist, deputy of Yonne
│         │    x (30 July 1867) : Maria-Anna Ellissen (1847–1933)
│         │    │
│         │    ├──> Alice Javal (1869–1943)
│         │    │    x (23 May 1882) Lazare Weiller (1858–1928), industrialist, senator of Bas-Rhin
│         │    │    │
│         │    │    ├──> Jean-Pierre Weiller (1890– ?)
│         │    │    │
│         │    │    ├──> Marie-Thérèse Weiller (1890– ?)
│         │    │    │
│         │    │    ├──> Georges-André Weiller (1892– ?)
│         │    │    │
│         │    │    └──> Paul-Louis Weiller (1893–1993), industrialist and financier
│         │    │                  x Princess Alexandra Ghica
│         │    │                          │
│         │    │                          ├──> Marie-Elisabeth Isarri
│         │    │                                                   │
│         │    │                                                   ├──> Countess Pilar de La Béraudière
│         │    │                                                                             │
│         │    │                                                                             ├──> Jacques-Louis de La Béraudière
│         │    │                  x Aliki Diplarakou
│         │    │                          │
│         │    │                          ├──> Paul Annick Weiller
│         │    │                                     x  Donna Olimpia Torlonia di Civitella-Cesi (daughter of Don Alessandro Torlonia, 5th Prince di Civitella-Cesi and the infant Beatriz of Spain)
│         │    │                                                   │
│         │    │                                                   ├──> Sybilla Weiller
│         │    │                                                                          x  S. A. Prince Guillaume of Luxembourg (son of Jean, Grand Duc de Luxembourg and the Princess Joséphine of Belgium)
│         │    │                                                   │
│         │    │                                                   ├──> Cosima Weiller
│         │    │
│         │    ├──> Jeanne Félicie Javal (1871– ?)
│         │    │    x Paul Louis Weiss (1867–1945), engineer
│         │    │    │
│         │    │    ├──> Louise Weiss (1893–1983), journalist and politician
│         │    │    │
│         │    │    ├──> Emile Jean Jacques Weiss (1894–1987), inspector of finances
│         │    │    │
│         │    │    ├──> André Eugène Paul Weiss (1899–1950), prefect
│         │    │    │
│         │    │    ├──> Francis Weiss
│         │    │    │
│         │    │    └──> Marie Jenny Emilie Weiss (1903–1987), pediatrician and psychoanalyst
│         │    │           x Alexandre Roudinesco
│         │    │           │  
│         │    │           └──> Élisabeth Roudinesco (1944–), historian and psychoanalyst
│         │    │
│         │    ├──> Jean Javal (1871–1915), engineer, deputy of Yonne
│         │    │    x Lily Lévy (1882–1958), writer
│         │    │
│         │    ├──> Louis Adolphe Javal (1873–1944), professor of medicine
│         │    │    │
│         │    │    ├──> 
│         │    │    │    } 2 daughters died in a concentration camp
│         │    │    ├──> 
│         │    │    │
│         │    │    └──> Léopold Javal
│         │    │
│         │    └──> Mathilde Julie Javal (1876–1944)
│         │         
│         │  
│         ├──> Pauline Javal (1842– ?)
│         │    x Jean Théodore de Salemfelds, officer in the army of Austria-Hungary
│         │ 
│         ├──> Ernest Javal (1843–1897), prefect of La Creuse
│         │    x Marie Seligmann
│         │   
│         ├──> Eugène Javal (1846–1847)
│         │
│         ├──> Alfred Javal (1848–1921), engineer and industrialist
│         │    x Claire Mathilde Dreyfous
│         │    │
│         │    └──> Fernand Javal (1884-1977), engineer and industrialist
│         │         x Lia Aline Schiller (daughter of A. Schiller and E. de Ricqlès)
│         │         │
│         │         └──> Antoine Javal (1921-2008), entrepreneur and collector
│         │            x Imogen Bayerthal
│         │              │
│         │              └──>Laurence Nebout-Javal (1956)
│         │                   x Emmanuel Nebout
│         │      
│         │            x Léone Leroy (1932-2009)
│         │              │
│         │              └──> Catherine Javal Van de Kerckhove (1964)
│         │                   x Jan Van de Kerckhove (1962-2003) (family of immemorial nobility from the country of Limbourg, counts since Charlemagne,   descendants of Maingut, nephew of Conrad, 5th duke of Franconia [8])
│         │                   
│         │
│         │              
│         │ 
│         └──> Sophie Javal (1853–1947)
│              x (1878) : Paul Wallerstein (died in 1903), engineer
│          
│
├──> 2 other sons
│
│
│
x (2) : Keyle Felix

== Bibliography ==
- Frédéric Viey, " La famille Javal ", in : Léo Hamon (dir.), Les Républicains sous le Second Empire, Entretiens d'Auxerre, Paris, Éditions de la Maison des Sciences de l'Homme, 1993, p. 91
- Dr Dov Weisbrot, "France in the European Domain: Identity, Languages and Revolutions"
