= Nicolas Delsor =

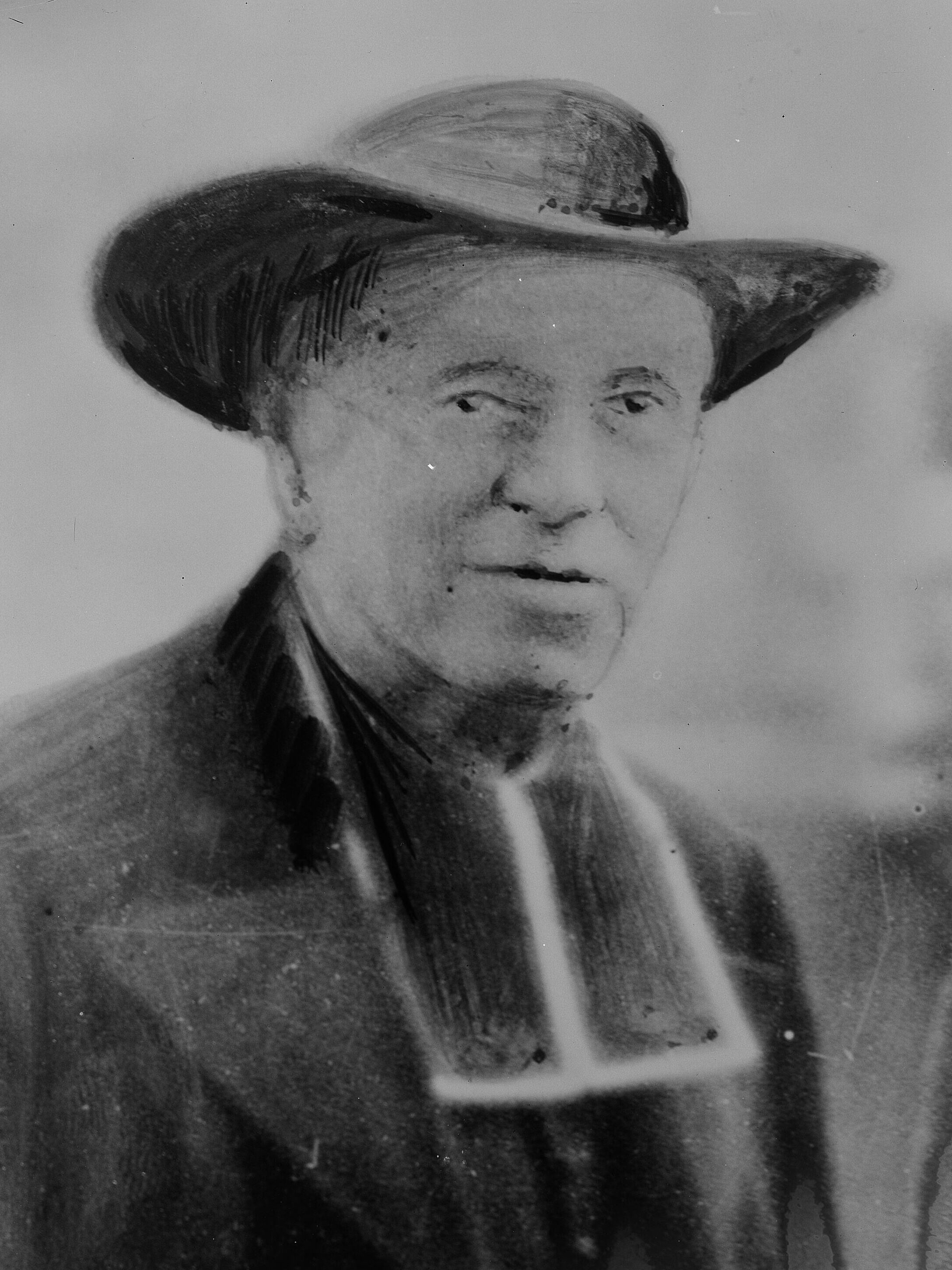
- L'abbé Delsor sénateur (1920)

Deputy of Alsace
- In office 1898–1918

Senator of Bas Rhin
- In office 11 January 1920 – 8 January 1927

Personal details
- Born: 5 October 1847 Strasbourg, Bas-Rhin, France
- Died: 20 December 1927 (aged 80)
- Occupation: Priest, politician

Abbé Nicolas Delsor (5 October 1847 – 20 December 1927) was a French priest and politician. He represented Bas Rhin in the German Reichstag before World War I, and then in the French Senate after the war. Although born French, his primary allegiance was to the Catholic church, and he drew criticism for cooperating with the German authorities after Alsace was annexed in 1871.

== Life ==
=== Early years (1847–98) ===
Nicolas Delsor was born in Strasbourg, Bas-Rhin, on 5 October 1847. His father came from the Auvergne. He entered the minor seminary of Strasbourg in 1858, at the age of 11. He was an excellent pupil, and after being ordained a priest in 1865 was asked to remain at the seminary for a while as a teacher. He left the seminary after Alsace had become part of Germany following the Franco-Prussian War of 1870.

Delsor was priest of several parishes in succession. He became well known as a preacher and as a speaker, fluent in both French and German. Around 1880 he founded the Revue catholique d'Alsace and became the director of this journal. Articles in the journal often discussed Christian trade unionism, a movement with German origins that drew on the Catholic tradition of social commitment. Delsor engaged in studies of the history of Catholicism in Alsace at this time. He was at first active in the movement protesting the German annexation of Alsace, but then became one of the leaders of the Catholic Party of Alsace. He went so far as to state that logically the party should join the main Catholic Party of Germany.

=== Reichstag deputy (1898–1918) ===
Delsor became a member of the Alsatian Landtag, and in 1898 was elected Deputy for Alsace in the Reichstag. He was supported by reactionary elements in the German government, but was opposed to the Prince of Hohenlohe, prefect of Upper Alsace. In Berlin he became known as a rabid Catholic polemicist. In 1900 he founded the daily newspaper le Volksfreund in Strasbourg. In one article he attacked Protestants in language that led to his imprisonment for three months for contempt of another church.

On 7 January 1904 Delsor visited Lunéville, where he was invited to a meeting of Alsatians living in the town. Some said Delsor asked that the discussion avoid politics, but others said it was a protest by reactionary Catholics against the ban on Volksfreund in France. Delsor was greeted by a police commissioner who handed him a notice directing him to leave France without delay. Delsor refused to sign the expulsion notice, but left France. The incident case a furious debate in the Chamber of Deputies on 22 January 1904 between the anticlericals and the nationalist right.

In 1907 Delsor was among the sponsors of the project to erect a monument in Wissembourg to the sculptor Frédéric Auguste Bartholdi. The monument was dedicated on 16 October 1909, with Delsor giving a speech on the religious aspects of sacrifice for "the homeland".

The National Union was founded in Alsace in June 1911 in an attempt to unite the Alsatian parties into a common regional program to consolidate the rights that the new constitution had defined. It failed to create a definitive program because its leaders could not agree on some basic issues. Émile Wetterlé^{(fr)} thought it should defend religion and oppose the left, while Daniel Blumenthal and Léon Boll had more secular and democratic views. According to Jean-Marie Mayeur^{(fr)} the party was, "clerical in the eyes of the democrats, anticlerical in the eyes of a part of the Center." Delsor, a member of the Catholic Center party, declined to join. He said, "Out duty [is] 'above all Catholic' and not 'above all Alsations'."

=== French senator (1920–27) ===
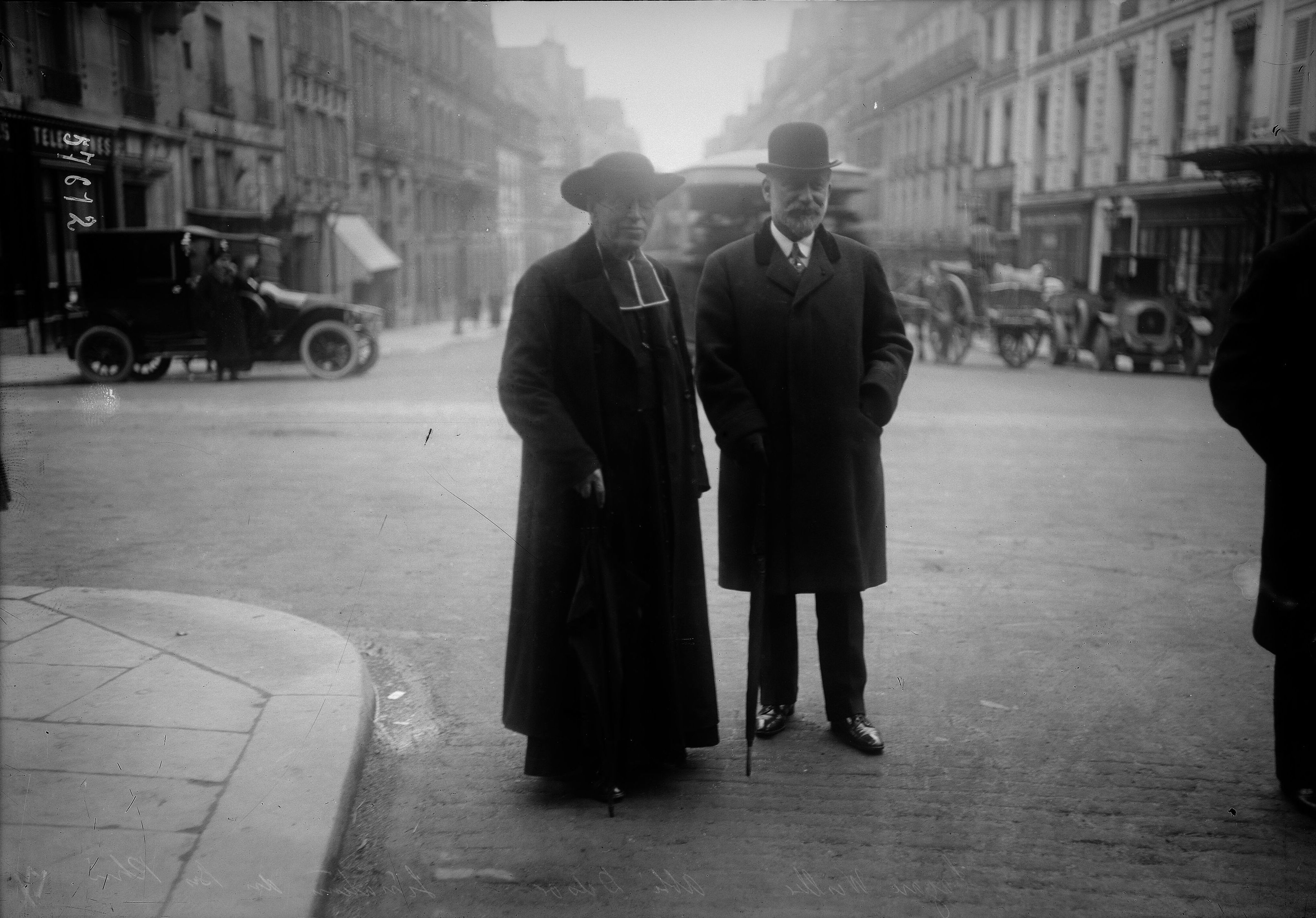
Nicolas Delsor and Lazare Weiller (1920)

After World War I (1914–18), the Catholic Center Party soon reestablished itself as the leading political organization in Alsace. Delsor was elected Senator of Bas-Rhin on 11 January 1920. He moved to Paris and sat with the Republican Left group. He belonged to committees on time off, hygiene, mandatory old age assistance and education. He devoted most of his energy to the last. He rarely participated in debates. He did not run for reelection in 1927, and left office on 8 January 1927. Delsor died in Strasbourg on 20 December 1927.

== Publications ==
Publications by Delsor included:

- Franz Spirago (1911), Recueil d'exemples appliqués [ ] catéchisme populaire ... à l'usage des catéchistes et des prédicateurs, Translated by Nicolas Delsor, Strasbourg: F. X. Le Roux, p. 552
- Nicolas Delsor (1921), Monseigneur Charles-Emile Freppel, Alsacien (Discours prononcé à la salle des Fêtes de Strasbourg, le 20 juillet 1921, à l'occasion de la translation de son coeur), Strasbourg: Impr.-éditeurs F. X. Le Roux et Cie, p. 14
- Nicolas Delsor (1926), M. le chanoine Pantaléon Mury, ancien supérieur du collège Saint-Etienne (Discours prononcé à la Distribution des prix du collège épiscopal de Saint-Etienne de Strasbourg, le 13 juillet 1926 (Extrait de la "Revue catholique d'Alsace")), Strasbourg: F. X. Le Roux et Cie, imprimerie de l'Evêché, p. 12

== Sources ==
- DELSOR Nicolas (in French), Sénat de France
- Duriez, Bruno (2005), Les Catholiques dans la République, 1905-2005 (in French), Editions de l'Atelier, ISBN 978-2-7082-3820-6
- Fischer, Christopher J. (2010-03-01), Alsace to the Alsatians?: Visions and Divisions of Alsatian Regionalism, 1870-1939, Berghahn Books, ISBN 978-1-84545-806-5
- Jolly, Jean (1960–1977), "Delsor (Nicolas)", Dictionnaire des parlementaires français de 1889 à 1940 (in French), Paris: Presses universitaires de France, ISBN 2-1100-1998-0
- Nicolas Delsor (1847-1927) (in French), BnF: Bibliotheque nationale de France
