= Miss Europe 1930 =

International beauty pageant

- Date: February 5, 1930
- Venue: Paris, France
- Entrants: 19
- Debuts: Belgium
- Withdrawals: Switzerland
- Returns: Czechoslovakia, Turkey
- Winner: Aliki Diplarakou; Greece

Miss Europe 1930 was the third annual Miss Europe competition and second under French journalist Maurice de Waleffe. Miss Greece won and 19 girls from Europe competed in the pageant. Belgium participated for the first time and one candidacy, that of Switzerland, was withdrawn. Czechoslovakia and Turkey returned to the pageant, they had not competed since 1927.

== Results ==
=== Placements ===
Placement	Contestant
Miss Europe 1930	Greece – Aliki Diplarakou
1st Runner-Up	France – Yvette Blanche Labrousse
2nd Runner-Up	Belgium – Jenny Vanparays

== Delegates ==
Nineteen contestants competed for the title.

- Austria – Ingeborg von Grienberger
- Belgium – Jenny Vanparays
- Bulgaria – Kunka Chobanova
- Czechoslovakia – Milada Dostálová
- Denmark – Esther Petersen
- England – Marjorie Ross
- France – Yvette Blanche Labrousse
- Germany – Dorit Nitykowski
- Greece – Aliki Diplarakou
- Holland – Rie Van der Rest
- Hungary – Maria Papst
- Ireland – Vera Curran
- Italy – Mafalda Morittino
- Poland – Zofia Batycka
- Romania – Zoica Dona
- Russia (in exile) – Irene Wentzel
- Spain – Elena Plá Mompó
- Turkey – Mubedjel Namik
- Yugoslavia – Stephanie "Caca" Drobujak

== National pageant notes ==
=== Debuts ===
Belgium went to Miss Europe for the first time.

=== Withdrawals ===
Switzerland withdrew from the pageant.

=== Returns ===
Czechoslovakia and Turkey returned to the pageant. They both last competed in 1927.
