= Louis Émile Javal =

French ophthalmologist (1839–1907)

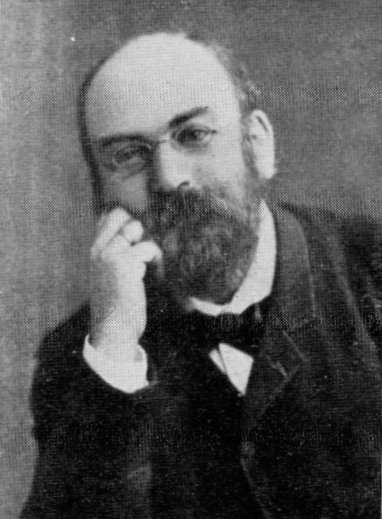
- Louis Javal in 1906
- Born: 5 May 1839; Paris, Kingdom of France
- Died: 7 January 1907 (aged 67)
- Education: University of Paris
- Known for: physiological optics
- Spouse: Maria Anna Ellissen (m. 1867)
- Children: 5 (including Alice Weiller)
- Scientific career
- Fields: ophthalmology
- Workplaces: University of Paris

Louis Émile Javal (5 May 1839 – 20 January 1907) was a French ophthalmologist born in Paris. Javal is remembered for his studies of physiological optics and his work involving a disorder known as strabismus.

== Early life ==
He was born in Paris to Léopold Javal (1804-1872) and Auguste Javal (née von Lämel; 1817-1893).

== Academic background ==
Originally trained as a civil engineer, he switched to the medical profession, receiving his degree from the University of Paris in 1868. Following graduation, he traveled to Berlin, where he studied under Albrecht von Graefe (1828-1870). During the Franco-Prussian War he served as a medical officer. In 1878 he opened an ophthalmological laboratory at the Sorbonne and was its director until 1900. Politically active like his father, he represented the district of Yonne in the French Parliament from 1884 to 1889.

== Contributions in ophthalmology ==
With his student Hjalmar August Schiøtz (1850-1927), he constructed an early keratometer, also known as the "Javal Schiötz ophthalmometer". This device is used to measure the curvature of the corneal surface of the eye, as well as to determine the extent and axis of astigmatism. Javal also made important contributions in regards to the study of eye tracking, and with his assistant Marius Hans Erik Tscherning (1854-1939), he researched astigmatism and conducted studies in the field of optics.

Javal described eye movements during reading in the late 19th century. He reported that eyes do not move continuously along a line of text, but make short rapid movements (saccades) intermingled with short stops (fixations). Javal's observations were characterised by a reliance on naked-eye observation of eye movement in the absence of technology.

Javal's interest in strabismus was due to the disorder affecting his father and sister. Javal himself had heterochromia. At middle-age Javal developed glaucoma, and by 1900 was totally blind after suffering repeated attacks of acute angle-closure. He was a friend of Ludwik Łazarz Zamenhof (1859-1917), the inventor of Esperanto, and he stressed the importance of learning this language by the blind. In addition, he was involved in social reform issues that included education and circumstances surrounding the poor. Today the "Louis Emile Javal Silver Service Distinction" is issued by the International Contact Lens Council of Ophthalmology. Javal died of stomach cancer and donated his left eye to histopathological research in England where, however, it got lost without a report being published.

== Personal life ==
He married Maria Anna Ellissen (1847–1933) on July 30, 1867. They had five children: Alice Anna (1869–1943), twins Jeanne Félicie (1871–1956) and Jean-Félix (1871–1915), Adolphe (1873–1944) and Mathilde Julie (1876–1947). His daughter Alice married Lazare Weiller and was the mother of four children (one of whom was Paul-Louis Weiller). Another daughter, Jeanne Félicie, married Paul Louis Weiss and was the mother of six children (including Louise Weiss and Jenny Aubry).

== Bibliography ==
- Du strabisme, dans ses applications à la théorie de la vision. Doctoral dissertation, Paris, 1868.
- Un opthalmomètre pratique, Annales d'oculistique, L. E. Javal, H. Schiötz: Paris, 1881, 86: 5-21.
- Manuel du strabisme. Paris, 1896.
- Entre aveugles; Paris, 1903. translated into German, English and Esperanto.
- Physiologie de la lecture et de l’écriture. Paris, 1905; bibliography in Annales d'oculistique, Paris, 1907, 137: 187.

== See also ==
- Javal family
