= Paul-Louis Weiller =

French industrialist and philanthropist (1893-1993)

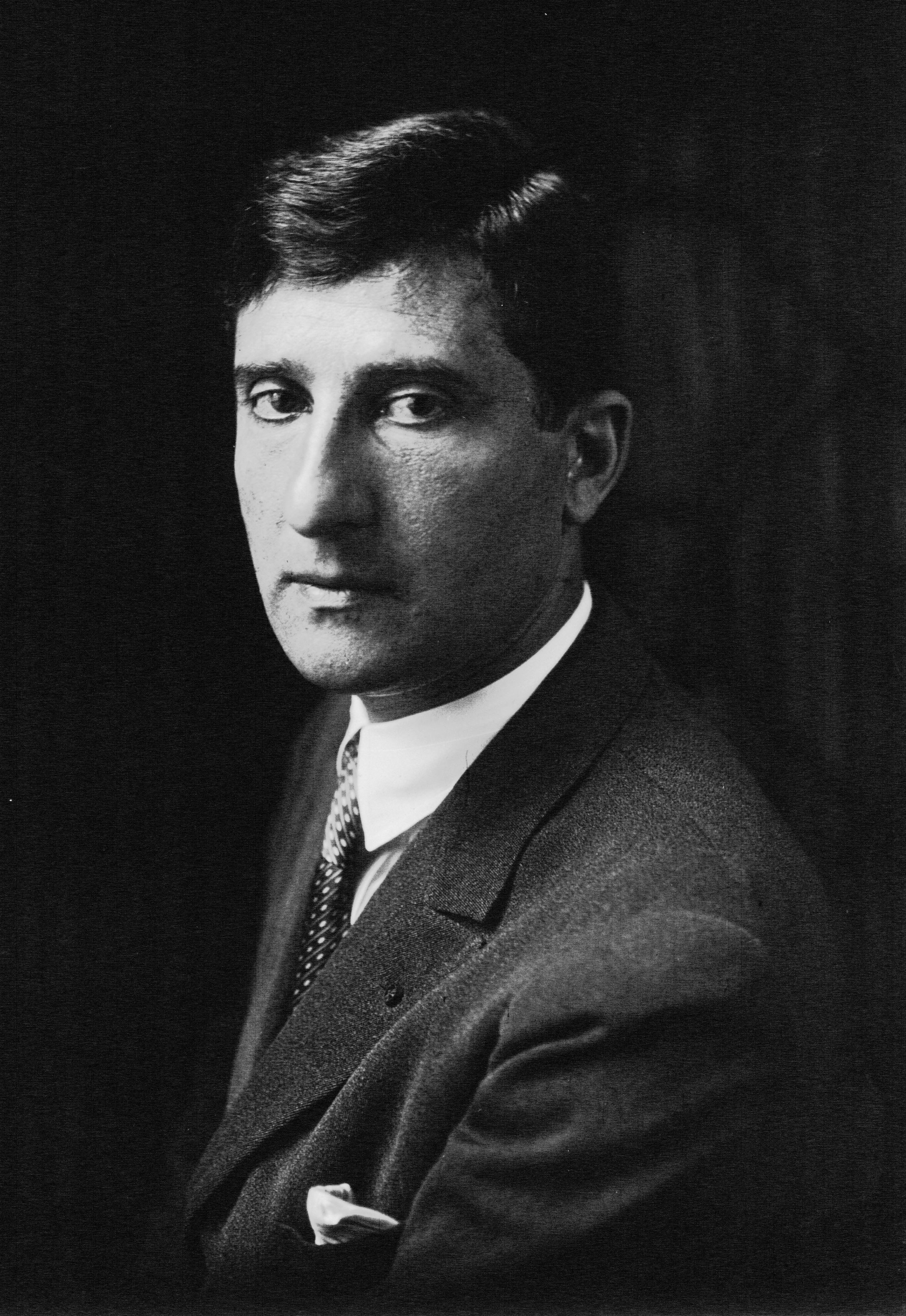
- Photograph from 1929
- Born: 29 September 1893; Paris, France
- Died: 6 December 1993 (aged 100); Geneva, Switzerland
- Education: École Centrale Paris
- Occupations: Industrialist; philanthropist
- Spouses: Princess Alexandra Ghica (m. 1922; div. 1931) Aliki Diplarakou (m. 1932; div. 1945)
- Children: Marie-Élizabeth Weiller (1923-2006); Paul-Annik Weiller (1933-1998)
- Parents: Lazare Weiller (father); Alice Anna Javal (mother)
- Relatives: Louis Émile Javal (grandfather); Louise Weiss (cousin); Jenny Aubry (cousin)

Paul-Louis Weiller (September 29, 1893, Paris - December 6, 1993, Geneva) was a French industrialist and philanthropist.

== Biography ==
From a Jewish Alsatian family, Weiller was the son of the industrialist and politician Lazare Weiller (1858–1928) and Alice Anna Javal (1869–1943), scion of the Javal family, who rose to prominence in business, finance, and politics during the 19th century. His maternal grandfather was Louis Émile Javal. Through his mother he was the cousin of Louise Weiss and Jenny Aubry.

Weiller studied engineering at the École Centrale Paris and graduated in 1914 with a graduate diploma. He later became an aviation hero during the First World War. Using aerial photography during his reconnaissance flights, he was shot down on several occasions and wounded.

Receiving 12 honorable citations from the army, he was made an officer in the Legion of Honor at the age of 25 (the youngest officer in the Legion of Honor to be so awarded after Georges Guynemer and René Fonck), he finished the war next to maréchal Foch and was present at the signing of the Treaty of Versailles as an aide-de-camp to the allied armies.

A business leader from the age of 29 (from 1922 to 1940), Weiller developed the most important airplane engine factory in Europe, Gnome et Rhône, which became Snecma S. A. after nationalization in 1945. From 1925, he progressively purchased capital in the aviation company CIDNA. He also participated in the creation of airlines serving Africa, which were all nationalized in 1933 to become Air France, of which he was one of the company's first administrators (in 1933, he was offered the post of president of Air France by Pierre Cot, the then ministre de l'Air, but refused the offer).

In 1940, Weiller and his family, his wife Aliki, his son Paul-Annik and his mother-in-law, Hélène Diplarakos, travelled to Bordeaux, France, where they received transit visas to Portugal from the Portuguese consul Aristides de Sousa Mendes, on 22 June. The family crossed into Portugal and stayed in Monte Estoril, at the Grande Hotel D'Itália, between 15 August and 23 August 1940, and the Hotel Atlântico, between 23 August and 25 September 1940. The family then flew from Lisbon to New York City on the Pan Am Atlantic Clipper seaplane in October 1940, with the exception of Paul-Louis.

Arrested on 6 October 1940 in Royat, he was stripped of his French citizenship by the Vichy government and placed under house arrest in Marseille. He escaped in January 1942, fleeing first to Morocco, then to Cuba, and finally to Canada, where he contributed to the efforts of France libre (he was issued passport no. 1). His mother was deported and murdered at Auschwitz in 1943.

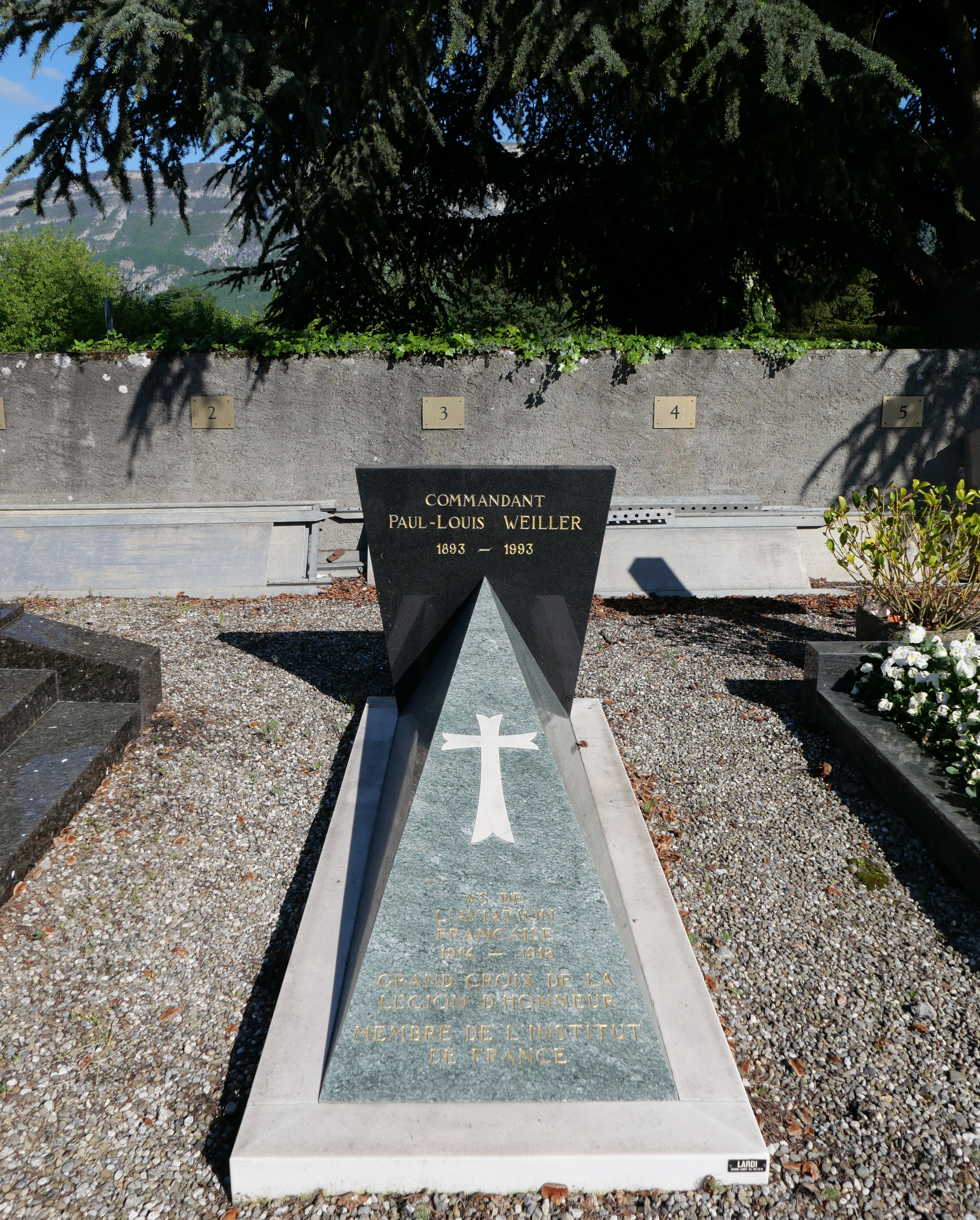
The grave in 2024.

Returning to Europe after the war, he began to concentrate his business activities first on energy (oil exploration in Venezuela and the Gulf of Mexico; natural gas exploration in Texas; electricity companies in Japan, etc.), and then later he focused on international finance. He subsequently became a philanthropist of the arts; through his influence and financial support, he contributed to the restoration of the Palace of Versailles, created a ballet company, and aided a number of artists (Robert Hossein, Roger Vadim, Maurice Béjart, Michèle Mercier, Brigitte Bardot, Alain Delon, etc.). His objective was to revive Paris as the capital of culture, an action that led to his election to the Académie des beaux-arts.

Paul-Louis Weiller led an active social life associating with the royal families of Europe, business and political leaders (Aristotle Onassis, Henry Ford II, Jean Paul Getty, Richard Nixon, and Georges Pompidou, some of whom from time to time worked for him), and personalities in the arts and entertainment, whom he gathered in last of the salon traditions as described by Marcel Proust. His home on the French Riviera, the villa La Reine Jeanne (designed by the American architect Barry Dierks), attracted international society for the greater part of the 20th century. Weiller's philanthropic activities included numerous charitable works.

Weiller died at the age of 100 years in Geneva and found his final resting place at the cemetery of Compesières, which is located next to the Compesières Commandry of the Order of Malta, in the Genevan municipality of Bardonnex.

A small park in the city of Sélestat (Bas-Rhin), of which he was made an honorary citizen, was named in his honor.

== Personal life ==
On 29 August 1922 in Paris, Weiller married Princess Alexandra Ghica, the daughter of Prince Ioan Ghica (1875–1922) and his wife Hazel Marie Paliner-Singer (1882–1951). With his first wife, he had one daughter, Marie-Élisabeth 1924–2006), later the wife of Irisarri.

Weiller and Alexandra were divorced on 25 March 1931, and on 31 October 1932 he married secondly Aliki Diplarakou (Miss Europe of 1930), from whom he was also later divorced. They had one son, Paul-Annik, whose daughter, Sibilla Weiller, married Prince Guillaume of Luxembourg, youngest son of Jean, Grand Duke of Luxembourg, in 1994.
