= Les femmes nouvelles =

French women's suffrage organisation

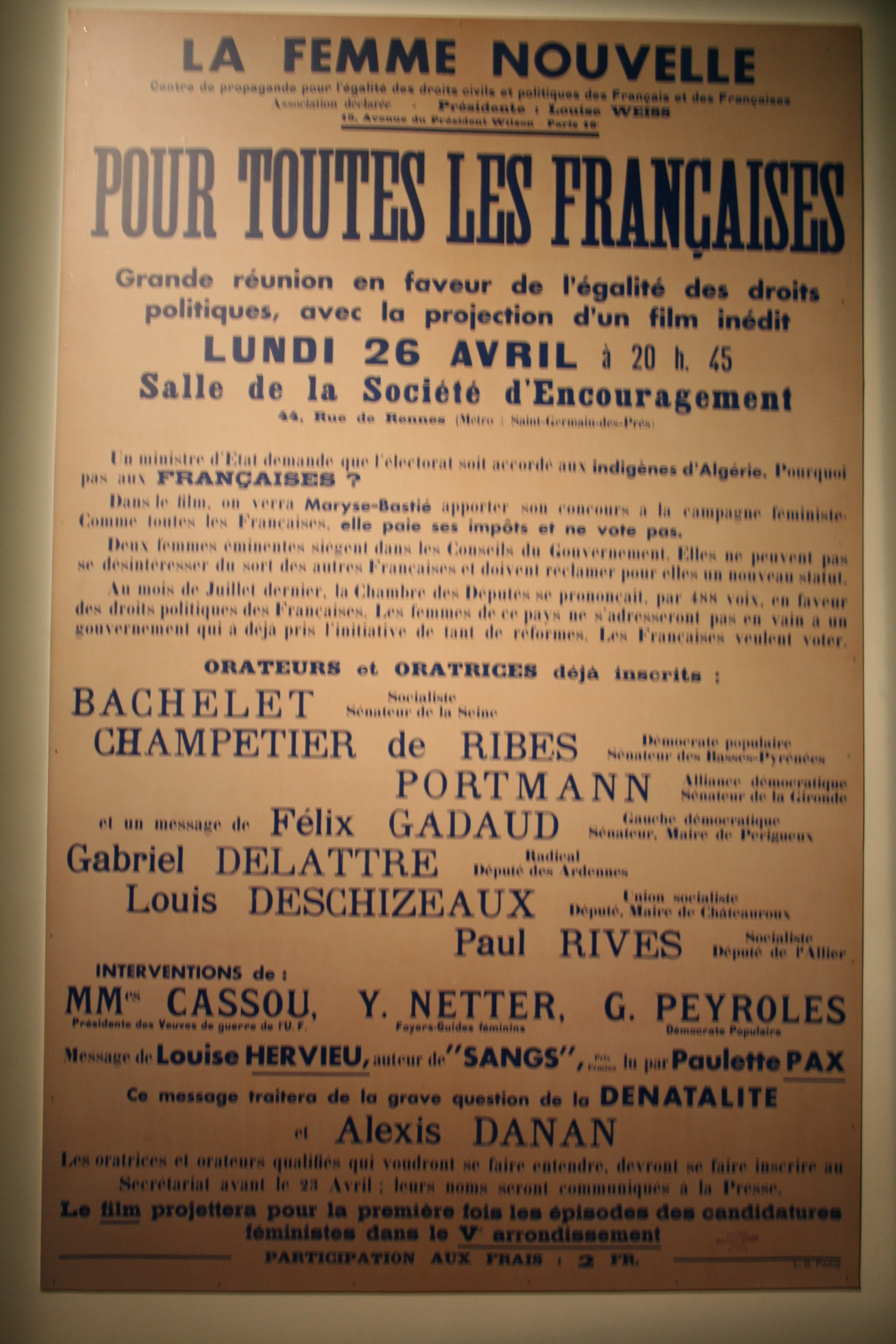
Affischen La Femme Nouvelle på Musée de Saverne.

La femme nouvelle ("The New Women") was a women's organisation in France that was founded in 1934.

Its purpose was to work for the introduction of women's suffrage. It was founded by Louise Weiss, who became its chair. The association was founded because of what was perceived as the passivity of the contemporary women's movement and politicians in France in the issue of women's suffrage. Weiss established the organizations headquarters at 55 Av. des Champs-Élysées.

The association was in contrast to organize and participate in intense demonstration and actions for women's suffrage during the 1930s. It arranged a number of public actions, which attracted considerable attention. However, the activity did not result in the introduction of women's suffrage because of the strong resistance toward the reform in the French Senate.

The struggle of suffrage was abruptly interrupted by the outbreak of the Second World War and the invasion and the occupation of France. Women's suffrage was introduced after the 1944 liberation of France.
