= John Russell (diplomat) =

British diplomat (1914-1984)

Sir John Russell GCVO CMG

British Ambassador to Ethiopia

Personal details
- Born: John Wriothesley Russell; 22 August 1914
- Died: 3 August 1984 (aged 69)
- Spouse: Aliki Diplarakou (m. 1945–1984)
- Children: 2
- Parent: Thomas Wentworth Russell (father)
- Education: Eton College
- Alma mater: Trinity College, Cambridge (B.A.)
- Occupation: Diplomat

Sir John Wriothesley Russell GCVO CMG (22 August 1914 – 3 August 1984) was a British diplomat and ambassador.

He was the only son of Thomas Wentworth Russell, better known as Russell Pasha, who was descended from John Russell, 6th Duke of Bedford.

He was educated at Eton College and graduated from Trinity College, Cambridge, in 1935 with a Bachelor of Arts (B.A.). He was part of the British Embassy in Moscow in 1941 and in 1956, also with a M.A. degree, after which he was awarded a CMG in the 1958 Birthday Honours. He was British Ambassador to Ethiopia, 1962–1966, was awarded a KCVO in 1965, being British Ambassador to Brazil, 1966–1969, GCVO in 1968, and British Ambassador to Spain, 1969 – 1974.

He was married to Aliki Diplarakou, the first Greek Miss Europe, and had a son, Alexander, and a daughter, Georgiana.

He was interviewed briefly in the famous documentary series The World At War in 1973.

== Ancestry ==
Ancestors of John Russell (diplomat)

16. John Russell, 6th Duke of Bedford
8. Lord Charles Russell
17. Lady Georgina Gordon
4. (Rev.) Henry Charles Russell
18. William Griffith Davies
9. Isabella Clarissa Davies
2. Sir Thomas Wentworth Russell
20. Henry Willoughby
10. Henry Willoughby
21. Charlotte Eyre
5. Leila Louisa Millicent Willoughby
22. Alexander William Robert Macdonald
11. Julia Louisa Bosville
23. Matilda Eliza Moffat Bayard
1. Sir John Wriothesley Russell
6. Francis Moore
3. Evelyn Corothea Temple Moore
