= Léopold Javal =

French banker (1804–1872)

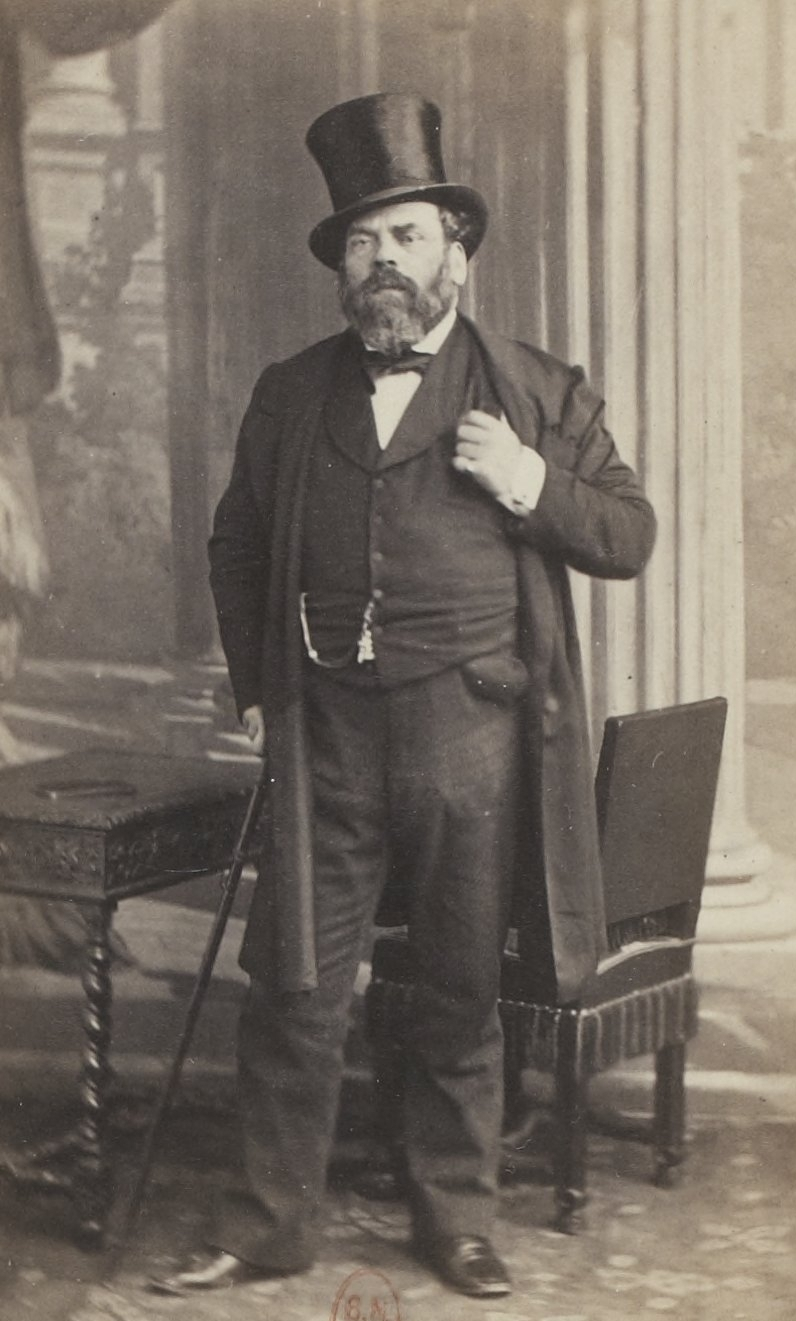
Leopold Javal

Léopold Javal (1 December 1804 – 28 May 1872) was a French banker, agriculturalist and politician.

== Biography ==
Léopold was born in Mulhouse into the Javal family, a French industrialist family. His father, Jacques Javal the Younger was one of the richest men in France and established one of the first printed textile mills in the Paris suburb of Saint Denis.

Léopold was part of the French army, taking part in the Algerian campaign, where he became a cavalry officer.

After the war, he took control of the family banking industry, using it to invest in and organise the rail network in Alsace. Together with the industrialist, Emile Koechlin, he constructed the Mulhouse-Cernay Railroad Line.

In 1851 he was elected as general council to the Gironde region in France. He was elected as deputy to the Yonne department in 1857, where he served in the legislature until his death.

Léopold died on the 28th of May 1872, and is buried in the Pere-Lachaise cemetery.
