= Alice Weiller =

French art collector (1869–1943)

Alice Anna Weiller (née Javal; 10 October 1869 – 7 September 1943) was a French art collector murdered at Auschwitz due to her Jewish heritage. The wife of Lazare Weiller, she was awarded the Legion of Honour. During the Second World War, she was interned at Drancy and deported to Auschwitz, where she was murdered.

She was the mother of the aviator and industrialist Paul-Louis Weiller.

== Life ==
The Javal family, who had made their fortune in Alsace, were Jewish mill owners, merchants, and bankers who settled in Paris, where Alice was born. She was the daughter of Louis Émile Javal (1839-1907), a well-known ophthalmologist and collector of Japanese art, and his wife Maria Anna Ellissen (1847-1933), and was one of five children, all given a liberal education. Her sister Jeanne married Paul Weiss and was the mother of Louise Weiss, a journalist and campaigner for women's rights and Jenny Aubry, a psychiatrist and psychoanalyst.

On 12 August 1889, Alice married Lazare Weiller (1858–1928), industrialist and regional senator, as his second wife, his first having died. They met through a family called Ellissen, her relations, investors in one of his companies. The witnesses at the wedding were Eugène Spuller, the poet Sully Prudhomme, and Adolphe Carnot, brother of the President of France.

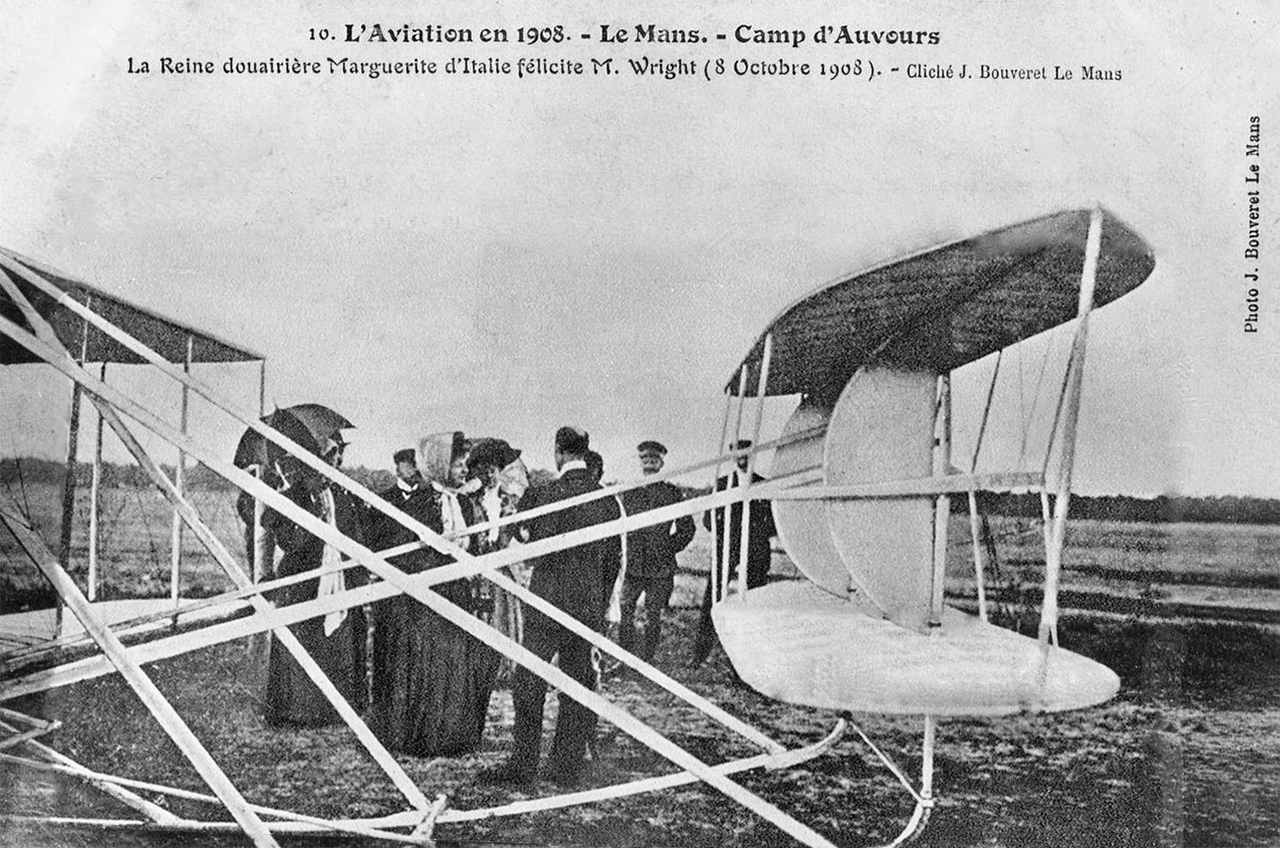
Wilbur Wright in France, October 1908

The Weillers had four children, Jean-Pierre (1890), Marie-Thérèse (1890), Georges-André (1892) and Paul-Louis (1893–1993). In 1908, Alice Weiller began to take a keen interest in aviation, after her husband had offered a prize of $10,000 for the first powered flight in France. She met the Wilbur Wright, who took the prize, and on 9 October 1908 made an early flight in their biplane, two days after Édith Berg. She did not herself become a pilot, as sometimes suggested, but her son Paul-Louis eventually did.

In 1932, Alice Weiller became vice-chairman of a committee of the Alsace-Lorraine Society promoting holiday camps for the working classes and subsequently was appointed as a chevalier of the Legion of Honour. During the Second World War, she was one of the French Jews interned at the Drancy internment camp near Paris. On 2 September 1943 she was deported to German concentration camps in Poland and was murdered at Auschwitz on 7 September.
