= Lazare Weiller =

French engineer, industrialist, and politician

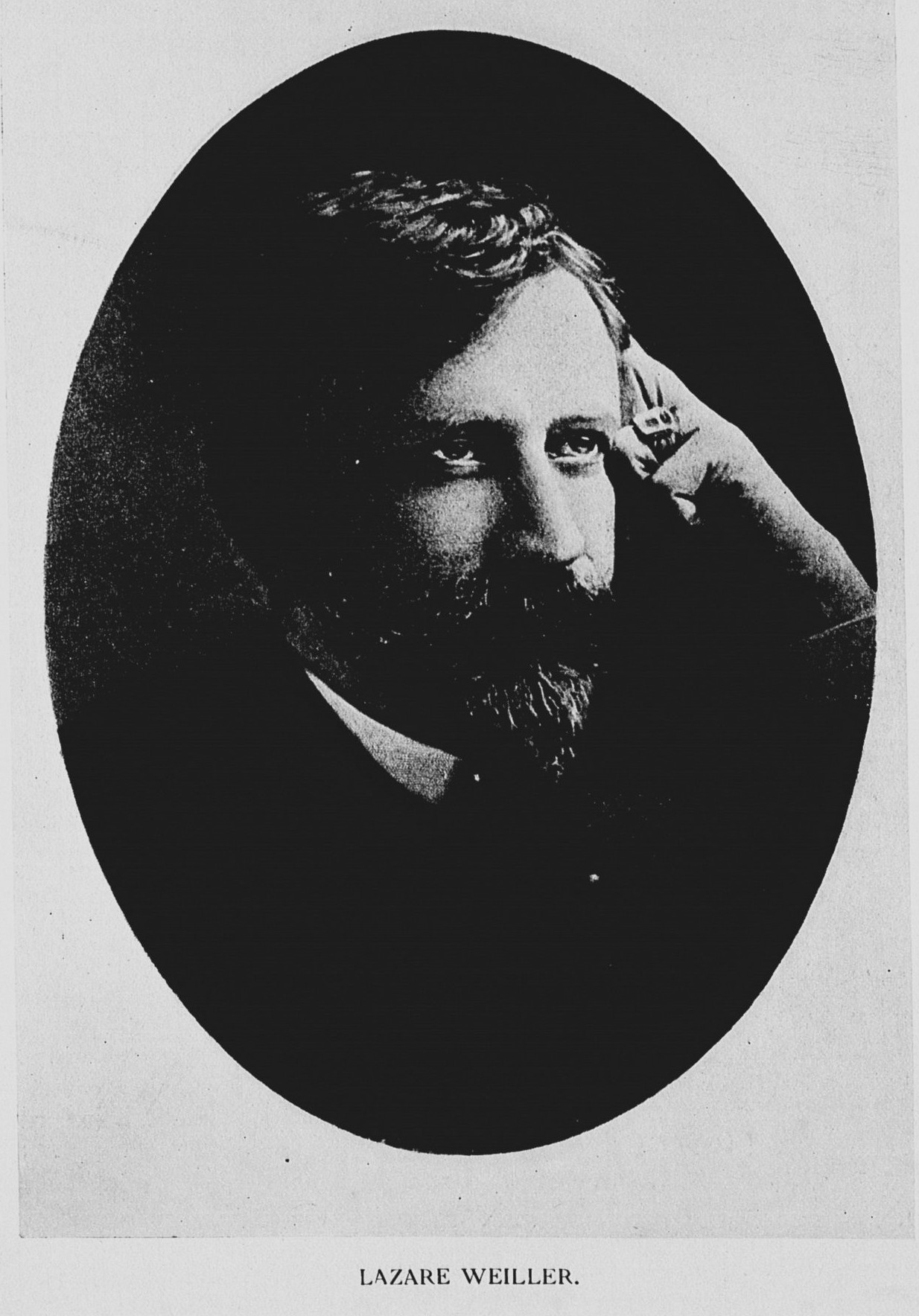
- Weiller from the Revue Illustrée (1911)

Deputy for Charente
- In office 10 May 1914 – 7 December 1919

Senator for Charente
- In office 11 January 1920 – 12 August 1928

Personal details
- Born: 12 July 1858 Sélestat, Bas-Rhin, French Empire
- Died: 12 August 1928 (aged 70) Territet, Vaud, Switzerland
- Occupation: Engineer, industrialist and politician

Lazare Weiller (20 July 1858 – 12 August 1928) was a French engineer, industrialist, and politician. He was born in Alsace and received a technical education in England and in his cousin's copper factory in Angoulême. He was very interested in the physical sciences, particularly the use of electricity to transmit sound and images. He proposed a system for scanning, transmitting and displaying images that was the basis for experiments by various television pioneers. He sponsored early aviation experiments by the Wright brothers. He founded several companies including a telephone wire manufacturer, a taximeter manufacturer, the first Parisian cab company to use automobiles, an aircraft company and a wireless telegraphy company. He was a deputy during World War I (1914–18) and then a senator until his death.

== Life ==
Lazare Weiller was born in Sélestat, Bas-Rhin, on 20 July 1858. His parents were Leopold Weiller (born 1807) and Reine Ducasse/Duckes (born 1819). He came from a Jewish family of Alsace. His grandfather, Bar Koschel, had applied for French citizenship in Seppois-le-Bas in 1808, took the name Bernhard Weiller, settled in Sélestat and became a "Judaic teacher". His father Léopold, a trader, married Reine Duckes, a servant. His family became wealthy.

Alsace became part of Germany in 1871 after the Franco-Prussian War. Weiller's mother was an ardent patriot and wanted him to study in France. He was sent to Angoulême to stay with his uncle Moïse Weille while he attended school. His uncle had a business making metal fabrics for the paper industry that he had transferred from Sélestat to Angoulême. Weiller went on to the Lycée Saint-Louis in Paris. He was not able to enter the École Polytechnique due to health problems, and instead went to Trinity College, Oxford, in England to improve his English and study Greek, physics and chemistry. After his military service he joined his uncle's company in Angoulême.

In 1882 Weiller converted to Catholicism. He married his niece Marie Marguerite Jeanne Weiller, but she died soon after. In 1883 Weiller founded the Société Lazare Weiller to make telephone and telegraph wire, which later became the Tréfileries et Laminoirs du Havre (TLH). On 12 August 1889 Weiller married Alice Javal (1870–1943) in Paris. She was the daughter and granddaughter of deputies of Yonne. Her father was Louis Émile Javal (1839–1907). Javal was an ophthalmologist, author of many papers on eye care and eye defects, who was deputy from 1885 to 1889. Their children were Jean-Pierre (born 1890), Marie-Thérèse (born 1890), Georges-André (born 1892) and Paul-Louis (1893–1993). (Note: Paul-Louis Weiller became an engineer and was a flying ace during World War I (1914–18). After the war he headed the Gnome et Rhône aircraft engine manufacturer, later to become SNECMA.)

Weiller visited the United States in 1901 and was very impressed by the booming economy and the metallurgical, electrical and mechanical industries. He wrote a book on the subject, Les grandes idées d'un grand peuple (The Great Ideas of a Great People). Weiller met the men who controlled the Chicago meat trusts, whom he called "simple, energetic and gentle men who were completely absorbed in their work, except perhaps M. Armour and his associate, M. [Arthur] Meeker, both of whom are passionate about automobiles." He visited the theater in New York, where he found the plays to be mediocre, although the performers were animated. He tried to explain the racial prejudice he found during his stay in Washington,

... the profound antipathy for the Negro, an antipathy we Europeans do not understand, first of all because we have taken seriously the theory of the equality of all races, and perhaps also because the image of the Negro, whom we only see in the theater, in the café-concert and in the circus, is forever tied to happy memories in our brains. It is, in fact, very probable that if Negroes came into our domestic lives and caused the same problems there as they do in the United States, they would arouse in us the same repugnance and be martyrized in our popular press and our vaudeville shows.

Later he wrote a series on Souvenirs d'Amérique in a Strasbourg newspaper. He observed that the working men of the USA had "a fine sense of their own worth, so that they did not suffer the bitterness and the meanness of class envy, an inestimable boon". They did not, as in Europe, form great radical political parties with the aim of overthrowing the existing order, but instead devoted all their effort to rising to a higher social level.

Weiller lost control of TLH when copper prices collapsed in 1901. At that time he also had to sell his Château d’Osny and his magnificent collection of paintings. However, he recovered and went on to found ventures such as a large fleet of Parisian automobile taxis, a manufacturer of airplanes and a wireless telegraphy company, and was on the board of various other companies. Emmanuel Chadeau sees Weiller as a good entrepreneur who did not have the managerial skills needed to operate the firms he founded.

Weiller was a deputy for Charente from 1914 to 1919, and a senator from 1920 until his death. In 1920 Weiller bought the Château de Dampierre, a large 19th-century building close to the "Chais Magelis" in Angoulème. He also built a luxury villa in Cannes, and bought the Hôtel de la lieutenance in Sélestat. Lazare Weiller died in Territet, Vaud, Switzerland on 12 August 1928. During World War II his wife was deported to the Auschwitz concentration camp, where she died on 7 September 1943. His grandson Paul-Annick Weiller married the granddaughter of Alfonso XIII of Spain, and his great-granddaughter Sibilla Weiller y Torlonia married Prince Guillaume of Luxembourg.

== Science and technology ==
Weiller was very interested in the physical sciences, and particularly electricity. In October 1889 he published a major article Sur la vision à distance par l’électricité (On vision at a distance by electricity) where he proposed a way to scan, transmit and project images. Weiller said he was inspired by the experiments by Jules Antoine Lissajous, who had used light reflected from small mirrors to investigate vibratory motion. His proposal was to use a rotating drum to which a number of tangential mirrors were attached, oriented so the image was scanned into a series of lines projected onto a selenium cell. (Note: The English engineer Willoughby Smith had discovered that the electrical conductivity of selenium varied considerably when it was exposed to light, which led to the invention of photoelectric cells. One drawback was that the selenium did not respond quickly enough to rapid changes in light levels, so some other material was needed to convert light to electricity.) The resulting electrical signal was transmitted over a wire, converted by a "telephone à gaz" back to light that was shone onto an identical mirror drum synchronized with the first drum, which would project the image onto a screen.

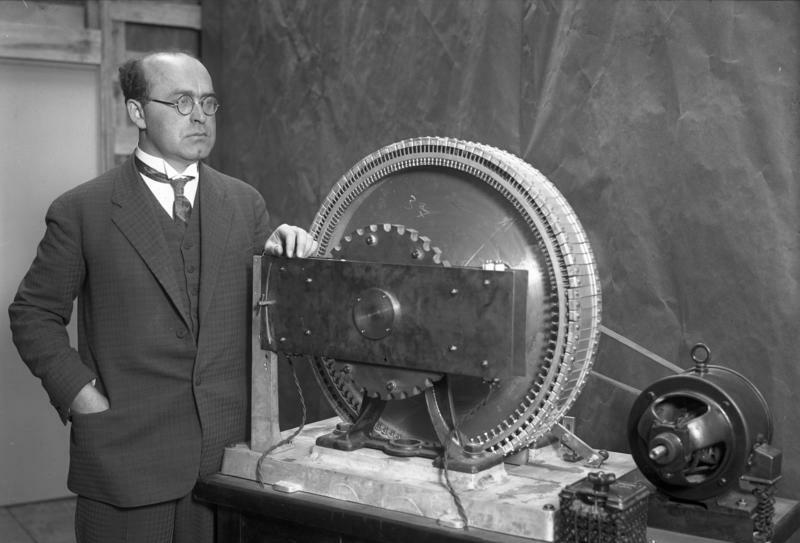
August Karolus with a Weiller mirror drum in 1930

Jules Verne wrote a short story for the New York Forum about a phonotelephotograph machine based on Weiller's invention, which he imagined to have finally become a reality in 2889 AD. Weiller's article on television did not have an immediate impact. The French researcher Marcel Brillouin wrote in the Revue générale des sciences pures et appliquées (Paris, 30 January 1891) that "M Weiller's 360-mirror cylinder ... is almost impossible to construct if you want fidelity." Constantin Perskyi did not mention the proposal in a 1900 paper on television by means of electricity. Later the concept was used by television pioneers in the US, UK and Germany such as Boris Rosing, Ernst Alexanderson, John Logie Baird and August Karolus^{(de)} and was commercially available by 1932. Weiller did not follow up on his television invention, but instead turned to wireless telegraphy.

Weiller wrote papers on scientific subjects such as Etudes électriques et mécaniques sur les corps solides (1885) and Traité général des lignes et transmissions électriques (1892), as well as many articles in the Revue des deux Mondes and Le Temps. Weiller was involved in early aviation experiments, and devoted 500,000 francs to helping the experiments of the Wright brothers, particularly to those of his friend Wilbur Wright. On 23 March 1908 Weiller agreed on terms for the French rights to the Wright brothers' invention. The patents were later used by his Compagnie de navigation aérienne.

Weiller was a member of the Société de Physique, the Société internationale des électriciens and the Société des ingénieurs civils among others.

== Industry ==
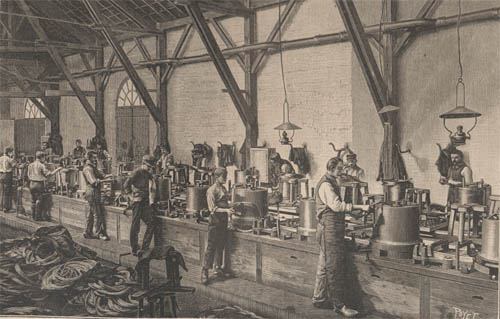
Atelier de tréfilerie Lazare Weiller 1892

While working at his cousin's copper fabric factory Weiller became interested in the problem of drawing copper wires, for which there was growing demand. He adapted the process of rolling hot steel rods to making copper wire. Weiller created the Société Lazare Weiller in 1883, with its first factory in Angoulême, and was the main owner of the enterprise. He developed a bronze alloy that combined the conductivity of copper with the strength to remain stretched between poles 50 metres (160 ft) apart, of great value to telegraph and telephone companies, and obtained several patents in France and other countries. Weiller collaborated with Jules Lair (Note: Jules Lair organized a telephone network in France in 1881, the Société générale des Téléphones^{(fr)}, which was taken over by the state in 1889.) of the Institut de France in manufacturing and distributing telephones in France. Weiller joined the board of the Société des téléphones, which was both a customer and an investor in his company.

Weiller acquired land along the Paris–Le Havre railway and the new Canal de Tancarville in 1895, and in 1896 built a larger factory at Graville^{(fr)} in the Le Havre region. In 1898 the Le Havre factory included forges, foundries, rolling mills and wireworks and processed copper, steel, aluminum, brass, bronze and nickel. The bulk of the output was for electrical equipment and construction of telephone and telegraph lines. In 1901 the company became the Tréfileries et Laminoirs du Havre (TLH). Weiller became associated with Swiss banks, and from 1907 started to acquire facilities and companies to build a huge industrial complex. TLH grew through acquisitions and mergers to gain a dominant position in the industry. In 1913 TLH's assets were 57,800,000 francs, making it the 22nd largest industrial company in France, and the third largest manufacturer of electrical equipment after the Compagnie Francaise Thomson-Houston and Compagnie Générale d'Electricité.

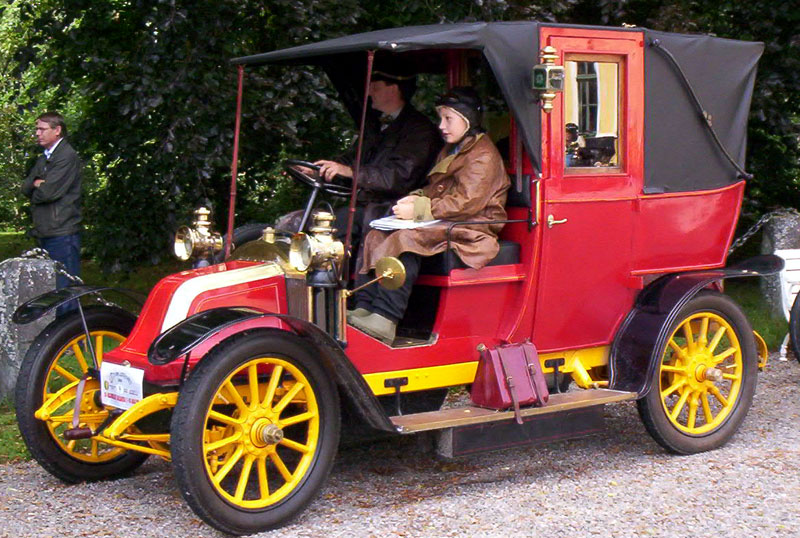
Renault Type AG-9 Taxi 1910

Weiller manufactured "taximeters" to measure mileage and founded the first automobile cab company in Paris. (Note: Friedrich Wilhelm Gustav Bruhn had patented a "fare-registering apparatus" in 1892. Weiller named his devices "taximeters", a term that was shortened to "taxi" to describe automobile cabs as opposed to horse-drawn cabs.) He founded the taximeter company in 1903 and the Société des fiacres automobiles (Automobile Cab Company) in 1905 in partnership with banks and car manufacturers. In 1905 the company ordered 250 8-horsepower 2-cylinder type AG cars from Renault, later called the "Taxis de la Marne". Renault started serial production to fill the order. The cars were fitted with taximeters. As of 1911 the Compagnie des Fiacres Automobiles had more than 3,000 of the small red Renault automobiles. A new town was built in Levallois-Perret where seven or eight thousand employees and workers prepared or drove the automobiles de place.

In 1908 Weiller was president of the TLH, the Chantiers de Dunkerque, the Chantiers de Normandie and the Société métallurgique bordelaise. He was a board member of the Entrepôts du Havre, the Docks de Rouen and the Compagnie des Voitures de Place in Paris. He worked with the Banque française de l'Afrique du Sud and the Maison de Banque Bauer et Marchal. The Weiller family also had interests in German Alsace.

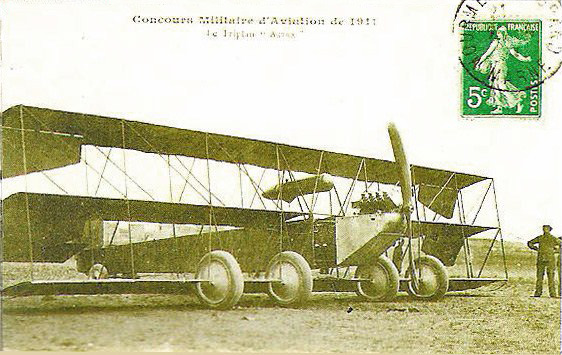
Astra triplane in 1911

In 1908 Weiller created a prize of $10,000 for the first person to achieve flight in France. By June 1908 the recent flights of Henri Farman and Léon Delagrange had reduced Weiller's confidence in the Wrights. Wilbur Wright wrote that he was "about scared out". By the end of the year these doubts had vanished as the Wright brothers made repeated demonstrations of their machines. Weiller formed a syndicate, the Compagnie Générale de Navigation Aérienne (CGNA: General Air Navigation Company), to market aircraft using the Wright design. Henri Deutsch de la Meurthe was his partner in the venture. They did not build the machines, but contracted with the airship firm Société Astra and the Ateliers et Chantiers de France of Dunkirk for the airframes and with Bariquand et Marre^{(fr)} for the engines. Weiller had interests in both the Chantiers de Dunkerque and Barriquand et Marre. The CGNA was not particularly profitable. It claimed to have received 50 orders for airplanes, but probably did not deliver more than 25. The first flight was made on 3 February 1909.

In September 1912 Weiller created the Compagnie universelle de télégraphie et téléphonie sans fil (CUTT: Universal Wireless Telegraphy Company). He was president, and participants included the German firm C. Lorenz AG, French banks and investors, and the American banker J. P. Morgan. CUTT bought Rudolf Goldschmidt's patents for use outside Germany from Hochfrequenmaschinen AG für drahtlose Telegraphie (Homag) and bought its Tuckerton, New Jersey, station. The station was to be delivered as soon as it was completed by Homag. Weiller worked with Guglielmo Marconi to set up the first transatlantic telegraphy station, which Telefunken opened in Hamburg in 1913. The CUTT was forced out of business due to nationalist outrage at a French telegraphy service depending on an alliance between a Jew and a German. In September 1913 the Marconi Wireless Telegraph Company purchased the patents and CUTT shares from Weiller.

Weiller was also director of various mining and electrical companies.

== Politics ==
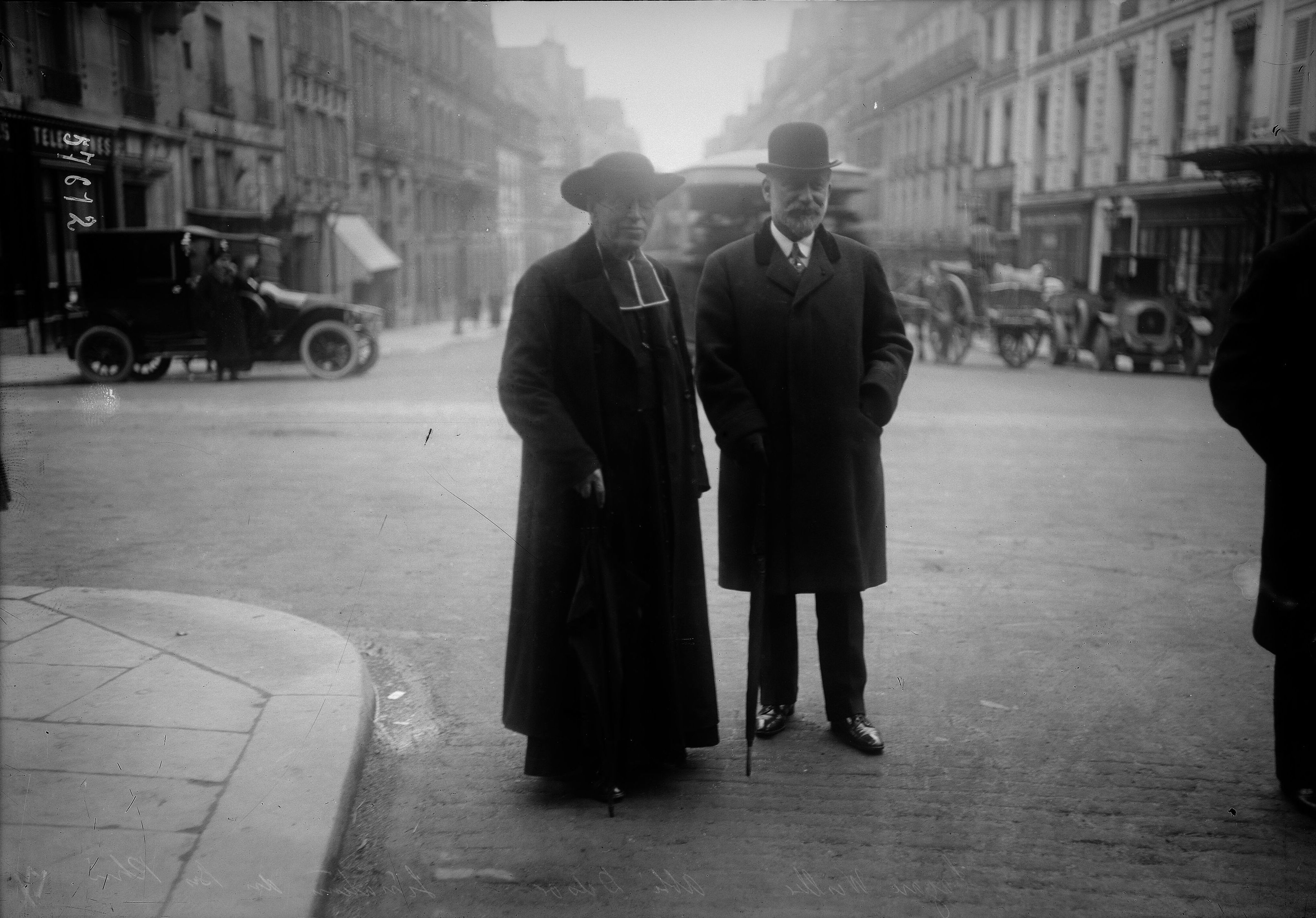
The senators Nicolas Delsor and Lazare Weiller in 1920

Weiller ran for election to the Chamber of Deputies in 1888 as a republican candidate for Angoulême during the Boulangism crisis, but was defeated. In 1914 at the request of the government Weiller visited Switzerland and wrote a report on German propaganda abroad and the shortage of raw materials in Germany. He was elected deputy for Charente from 10 May 1914 to 7 December 1919. In the chamber he spoke for the people of his native Alsace, which was occupied by Germany at that time. He sat with the left, and was a member of the committees on tax legislation and on posts and telegraphs. In 1917 Weiller submitted a project for the people of Alsace-Lorraine to adopt French versions of their [German] names to "protect them from public malignity and the reprisals of the mob". It was rejected for patriotic reasons, since the Alsace-Lorrainers were considered to have always been part of the French family.

Weiller ran for reelection on 16 November 1919 but was defeated. He was elected senator for Charente on 11 January 1920 and reelected on 9 January 1927, holding office until his death. On 23 March 1920 Le Figaro published an article by Weiller in which he argued that France could have achieved a favorable end to the war in 1917 if she had had a representative in the Vatican during peace negotiations at that time. He sat with the democratic left group, and was a member of the foreign affairs committee.

== Publications ==
Publications by Weiller included:

- Lazare Weiller (1881), Conférence faite à l'exposition d'électricité de Paris (Réunion internationale des électriciens, séance du 15 octobre 1881 : lignes téléphoniques aériennes, emploi du fil de bronze phosphoreux), Paris: A. Derenne, p. 10
- Lazare Weiller (1884), Recherches sur la conductibilité électrique des métaux et de leurs alliages, rapports avec la conductibilité calorifique, communication faite à la Société internationale des électriciens, dans sa séance du 7 mai 1884, Paris: impr. de Chaix, p. 47
- Lazare Weiller (1885), Études électriques et mécaniques sur les corps solides, Paris: J. Michelet, p. 223
- Lazare Weiller (1889), "Nouveaux alliages industriels des métaux autres que le fer", Bulletin de la Société de l'Industrie Minérale, Exposition universelle de 1889. Congrès international des mines et de la métallurgie, 2.III, Saint-Étienne: impr. de Théolier: 40
- Lazare Weiller; Henry Vivarez (1892), Traité général des lignes et transmissions électriques, Paris: G. Masson, p. 828
- Lazare Weiller (1894), Forges, fonderie, laminoirs et tréfilerie du cuivre pur et de ses alliages. Affinage et traitement électrolytique des métaux. Manuel pratique pour l'emploi des conducteurs électriques produits par les usines Lazare Weiller et Cie, Paris, p. 60
- Lazare Weiller (1904), Les Grandes idées d'un grand peuple : mission diplomatique aux États-Unis par Lazare Weiller, Paris: F. Juven, p. 401
- Lazare Weiller (1909), "De Montgolfier à Wilbur Wright", Bulletin de la Société archéologique le Vieux papier (compte rendu de la 52e réunion de la Société archéologique Le Vieux), Paris: 33
- Lazare Weiller (1915), Notes sur l'activité allemande en Suisse, p. 28
- Lazare Weiller (1918), La Dépression allemande vue de Suisse, Illustrations de Maurice Neumont, Paris: Union des grandes associations françaises, p. 40
- Lazare Weiller (1925), In memoriam. Pro Alsatia, Paris: la Renaissance du Livre, p. 305

== Sources ==
- Alexander, Robert (2013-04-11), The Inventor of Stereo: The Life and Works of Alan Dower Blumlein, CRC Press, ISBN 978-1-136-12038-1
- Buell, Raymond L. (March 1921), "France and the Vatican", Political Science Quarterly, 36 (1), The Academy of Political Science: 30–50, doi:10.2307/2142660, JSTOR 2142660
- Burns, Russell W. (2004), Communications: An International History of the Formative Years, IET, ISBN 978-0-86341-330-8
- Chadeau, Emmanuel (1986), "Poids des filières socio-culturelles et nature de l'invention: l'aéroplane en France jJusqu'en 1908", L'Année Sociologique (1940/1948-) (in French), 3 (36), Presses Universitaires de France: 93–112, JSTOR 27889911
- Cleveland, Cutler J.; Morris, Christopher G. (2013-11-15), Handbook of Energy: Chronologies, Top Ten Lists, and Word Clouds, Elsevier Science, ISBN 978-0-12-417019-3
- Crouch, Tom D. (2003-04-17), The Bishop's Boys: A Life of Wilbur and Orville Wright, W. W. Norton, ISBN 978-0-393-34746-3
- Devéze, Gérard (25 October 1911), Dumas, François- Guillaume (ed.), "Lazare Weiller", Revue illustrée, Paris: Ludovic Baschet
- Gilliéron, Patrick (18 December 2013), "La visite de l'Usine RENAULT de Cléon Commission "Aérodynamique" 3AF", 3Af (in French), archived from the original on 2018-03-06
- Graf von Polier, Christoph, "Lazare Weiller", geneanet
- Guggenheim, Alain, Alice Javal
- Harré, Rom; Moghaddam, Fathali M. (2016-01-25), Questioning Causality: Scientific Explorations of Cause and Consequence Across Social Contexts, ABC-CLIO, ISBN 978-1-4408-3179-9
- Jolly, Jean (1960–1977), "Weiller (Lazare)", Dictionnaire des parlementaires français de 1889 à 1940 (in French), Paris: Presses universitaires de France, ISBN 2-1100-1998-0
- Lagana, Marc (1990), Le Parti Colonial Français: Éléments d'Histoire, PUQ, ISBN 978-2-7605-2304-3
- Lange, A. (5 March 2018a), "L'impact de la roue à miroirs", Histoire de la télévision (in French)
- Lange, A. (5 March 2018b), "Lazare Weiller (1858-1928), Météore de l'histoire de la television", Histoire de la télévision (in French)
- Lapierre, Nicole (April–June 1993), "La francisation des noms", Ethnologie française (in French), 23 (2, Immigration. Identités. Intégration), Presses Universitaires de France: 207–214, JSTOR 40989461
- Lazare Weiller (in French), Assemblée nationale
- Lazare Weiller (1858-1928) (in French), BnF: Bibliotheque nationale de France
- Passy, Louis (1907), Jules Lair (PDF) (in French), Paris: Pontoise / Imprimierie Lucien
- Portes, Jacques (2006-11-02), Fascination and Misgivings: The United States in French Opinion, 1870-1914, Cambridge University Press, ISBN 978-0-521-02691-8
- Robert, Adolphe; Cougny, Gaston (1889–1891), "Javal (Louis, Emile)", in Edgar Bourloton (ed.), Dictionnaire des Parlementaires français (1789–1889) (in French)
- Smith, Michael S. (Spring 1998), "Putting France in the Chandlerian Framework: France's 100 Largest Industrial Firms in 1913", The Business History Review (in French), 72 (1), The President and Fellows of Harvard College: 46–85, doi:10.2307/3116595, JSTOR 3116595, S2CID 154027899
- Smith, Willoughby (1873), "Effect of Light on Selenium During the Passage of an Electric Current", Nature, 7 (173): 303, Bibcode:1873Natur...7R.303., doi:10.1038/007303e0
- "Texte n° 55 : Arrêté du 18 janvier 2002 portant apposition de la mention " Mort en déportation " sur les actes et jugements déclaratifs de décès", JORF (in French) (85), 11 April 2002
- Thermeau, Gérard-Michel (16 October 2016), "Lazare Weiller : un esprit visionnaire", Contrepoints (in French)
- Ware, Sedley Lynch (January 1922), "France before the War", The Sewanee Review, 30 (1), The Johns Hopkins University Press: 27–38, JSTOR 27533498
- Zelek, Richard; Defortsecu, Jacques (Autumn 2012), "Histoire de l'entreprise Tréfileries et Laminoirs du Havre de de ses salariés" (PDF), Le Fil Rouge (in French) (45), CGT Institut d'histoire sociale
