= 1925 in architecture =

The year 1925 in architecture involved some significant events.

== Events ==
- April–October – International Exhibition of Modern Decorative and Industrial Arts (Exposition Internationale des Arts Décoratifs et Industriels Modernes) in Paris.
- May 25 – Second Madison Square Garden (the version built 1890 and designed by Stanford White) is closed on this date and demolished shortly after.
- St. Bernard de Clairvaux Church (12th century) is shipped from Sacramenia, Segovia, Spain to the United States by William Randolph Hearst.

== Buildings and structures ==
=== Buildings opened ===
- November 18 – Willard Straight Hall, Cornell University, designed by Delano & Aldrich opens. 4,800 people come to see the building on opening day, followed by 3,000 people the next day.

=== Buildings completed ===
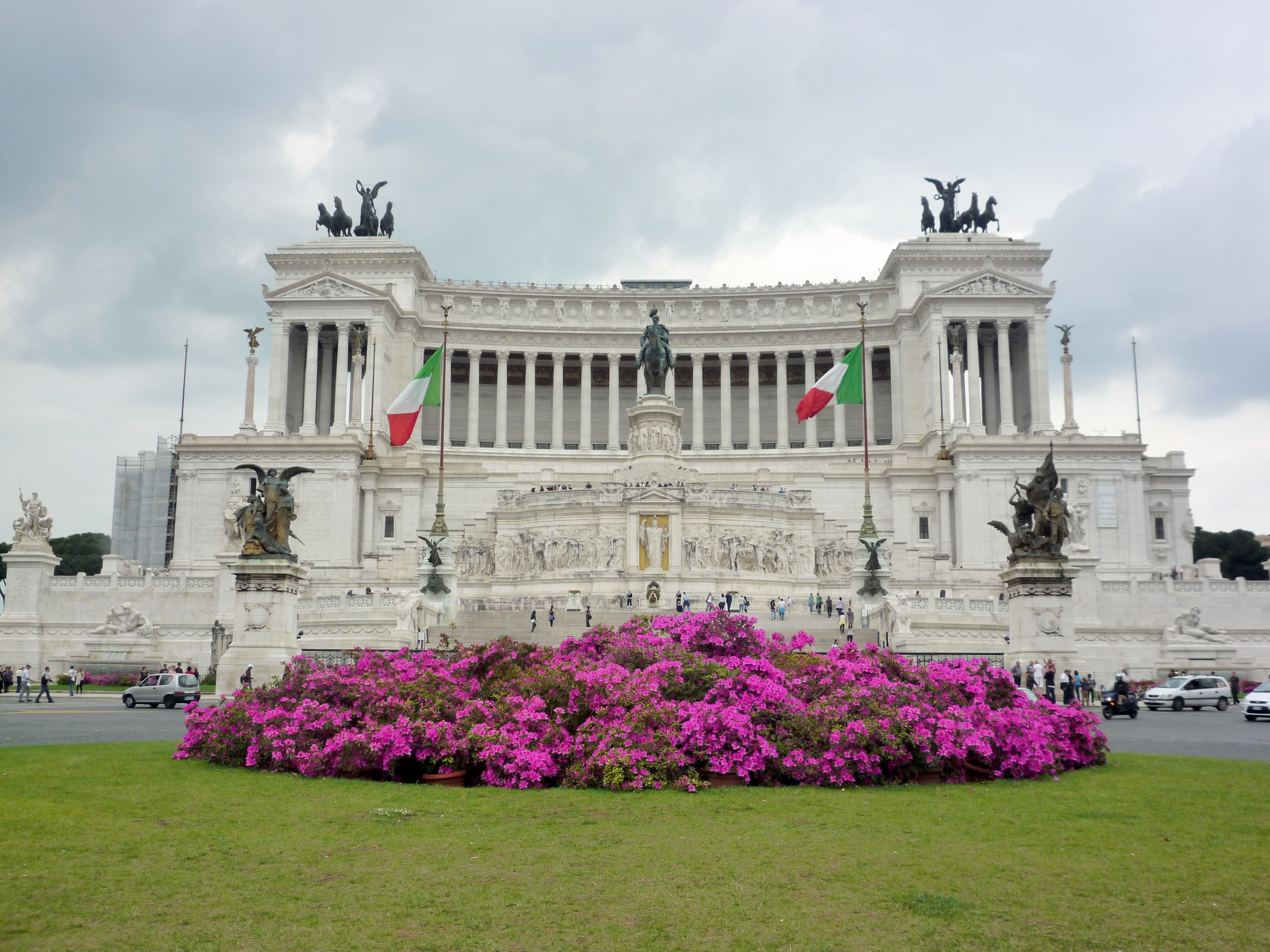
Altare della Patria in Rome, Italy

- Mount Pleasant Library (Washington, D.C.), designed by Edward Lippincott Tilton, opens.
- Great Synagogue (Tel Aviv), designed by Yehuda Magidovitch, is completed.
- Administration Building at Texas Technological College (modern-day Texas Tech University) in Lubbock, Texas, designed by Wyatt C. Hedrick, opens.
- Altare della Patria (Monumento Nazionale a Vittorio Emanuele II) in Rome, designed by Giuseppe Sacconi (died 1905) in 1884, is completed.
- Uppståndelsekapellet (Resurrection Chapel), Skogskyrkogården (Woodland Cemetery), Stockholm, Sweden, designed by Sigurd Lewerentz, is built.
- Villa Le Trident at Théoule-sur-Mer on the French Riviera, designed by Barry Dierks, is built.
- Ennis House in Los Angeles, designed by Frank Lloyd Wright.
- Government House of Thailand, in Bangkok, then known as Baan Norasingha (Thai: บ้านนรสิงห์), designed by Corrado Feroci.

== Awards ==
- AIA Gold Medal – Edwin Lutyens; Bertram Goodhue.
- RIBA Royal Gold Medal – Giles Gilbert Scott.
- Prix de Rome, architecture: Alfred Audoul.

== Births ==
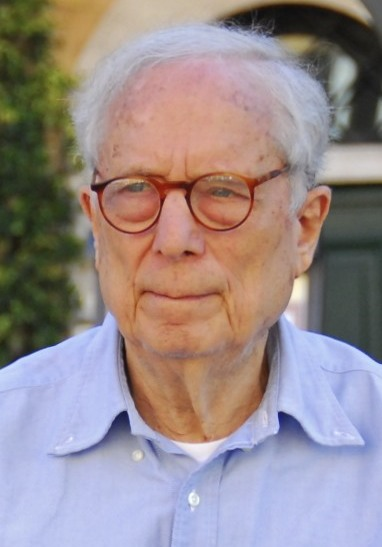
Robert Venturi

- January 14 – Aarno Ruusuvuori, Finnish architect (died 1992)
- January 17 – Gunnar Birkerts, Latvian American architect (died 2017)
- April 6 – Paul Ritter, Australian architect, town planner, sociologist, artist and author (died 2010)
- May 18 – Justus Dahinden, Swiss architect and writer (died 2020)
- May 31 – Frei Otto, German Pritzker Prize-winning architect and structural engineer (died 2015)
- June 25 – Robert Venturi, American Pulitzer Prize-winning architect (died 2018)
- August 20 – Henning Larsen, Danish architect (died 2013)

== Deaths ==
- January 8 – Stewart Henbest Capper, British Arts and Crafts architect (born 1859)
- April 13 – August Endell, German Jugendstil architect and designer (born 1871)
- September 13 – Emily Elizabeth Holman, American architect (born 1854)
- December 26 – Jan Letzel, Czech architect (born 1880)
