= Villa Aujourd'hui =

Villa Aujourd’hui
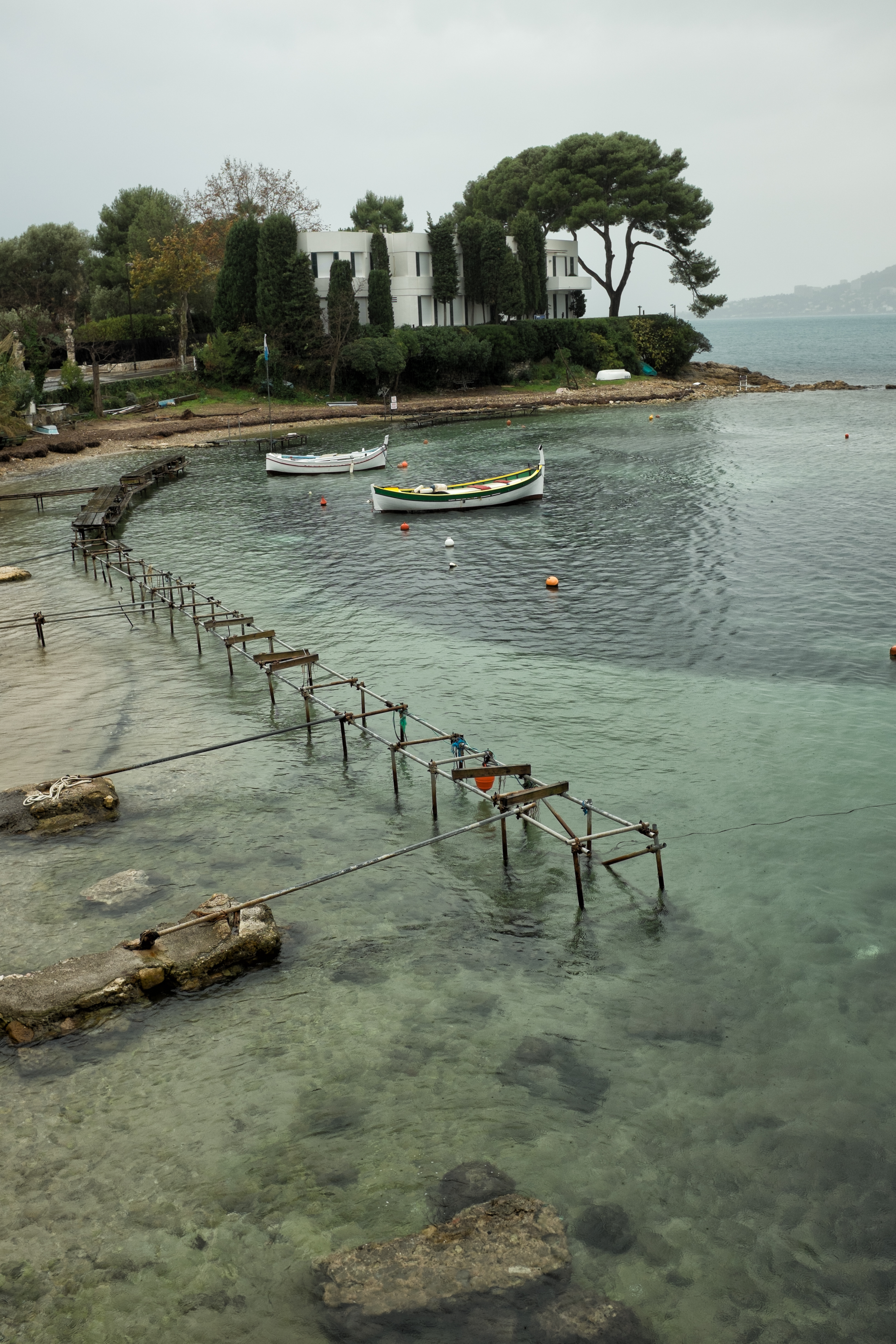
- Side view of the Aujourd'hui Villa with Olivette Harbour in the foreground
- Interactive map of Villa Aujourd’hui
- Location: Antibes, Provence-Alpes-Côte d'Azur, France
- Coordinates: 43.5510°N 7.1198°E
- Designer: Barry Dierks
- Type: Villa
- Completion date: 1938

The villa Aujourd'hui is a Modernist villa built by the American architect Barry Dierks (1899–1960) for the Palm Beach, Florida, socialite, Mrs. Audrey Chadwick. Located in Antibes and built in 1938, the villa Aujourd'hui is one of the most distinctive of Dierks' Riviera homes and was one of the last expressions of the Modernist style to have been built on the Riviera prior to the outbreak of World War II.

== Background ==
Starting in 1923, the Riviera started to become a summer resort, but it was the American multimillionaire, Frank Jay Gould, who was responsible for turning the Riviera into a summer resort by encouraging hoteliers to open their hotels at the beginning of spring rather than in winter as was the tradition in the 19th century. With his wife, Florence, the two attracted friends, family, artists, and the wealthy for not only sporting activities and stylish pursuits under the sun, but also for social and cultural pursuits. Through the couple's financial backing, Juan-les-Pins became a center for summer activities on the Riviera; this was quickly followed in 1926 with their backing of the hotel Palais de la Méditerranée in Nice. The Gould's efforts were continued by Gerald and Sara Murphy, who had moved to cap d’Antibes. Their home, Villa America, was a center of Riviera social life receiving the likes of Scott Fitzgerald, John Dos Passos, Serge Diaghilev and Pablo Picasso.

== History ==
Mrs. Audrey Chadwick was an active member of the Riviera's expatriate social set that espoused the seductive lifestyle of the South of France. Due to her association with Riviera society, she was introduced to the American expatriate architect, Barry Dierks, who was capable of building a villa in the Modernist, Art Deco style that was then popular in Miami. She named this villa, Today, after her home in Palm Beach, Florida. Around 1950, Jack L. Warner purchased the villa and Aujourd’hui received the royalty of Hollywood, notably, Charlie Chaplin and Ava Gardner.

== Description ==
The villa, which was built on a plot of land that Dierks liked to describe as being the size of a grand piano, replaced an earlier modest structure named the Bungalow. He exploited the narrowness of the site and designed a traditional two-story plan with a basement-level garage.

Combining monumentality with symmetry and in response to the undulating topography of the site, Dierks designed a Modernist entry with a bold undulating façade and semi-circular drive that is unique on the Riviera.

The main part of the building houses an enfilade of receptions rooms. On the ground floor, the cross-vestibule, which features a free-standing spiral staircase with a white-enameled banister supported by Venetian glass balusters, opens onto the dining room, which is directly across from the entrance. The stairwell is lit by an arched skylight that is decorated with an abstract design and signed “V. L.”. To the west, a series of terraces line the shore.

To one side of the dining room is the salon, which opens on a panoramic view of the Golfe-Juan and Juan-les-Pins; and on the other side is the pantry, kitchen and service areas including the garage. The salon is further noted by the large carpet designed by Roger-Henri Expert and Pierre Patout (woven in Cogolin) for the French Pavilion at the 1939 World's Fair in New York. The rooms are painted white and appointed with black marble fireplaces.

Upstairs there are five bedrooms with en suite bathrooms; staff quarters that include four bedrooms and one bathroom are also located on this level.

== See also ==
- Barry Dierks
- Modernism
- Antibes
