= Château de l'Horizon =

Villa in southern France

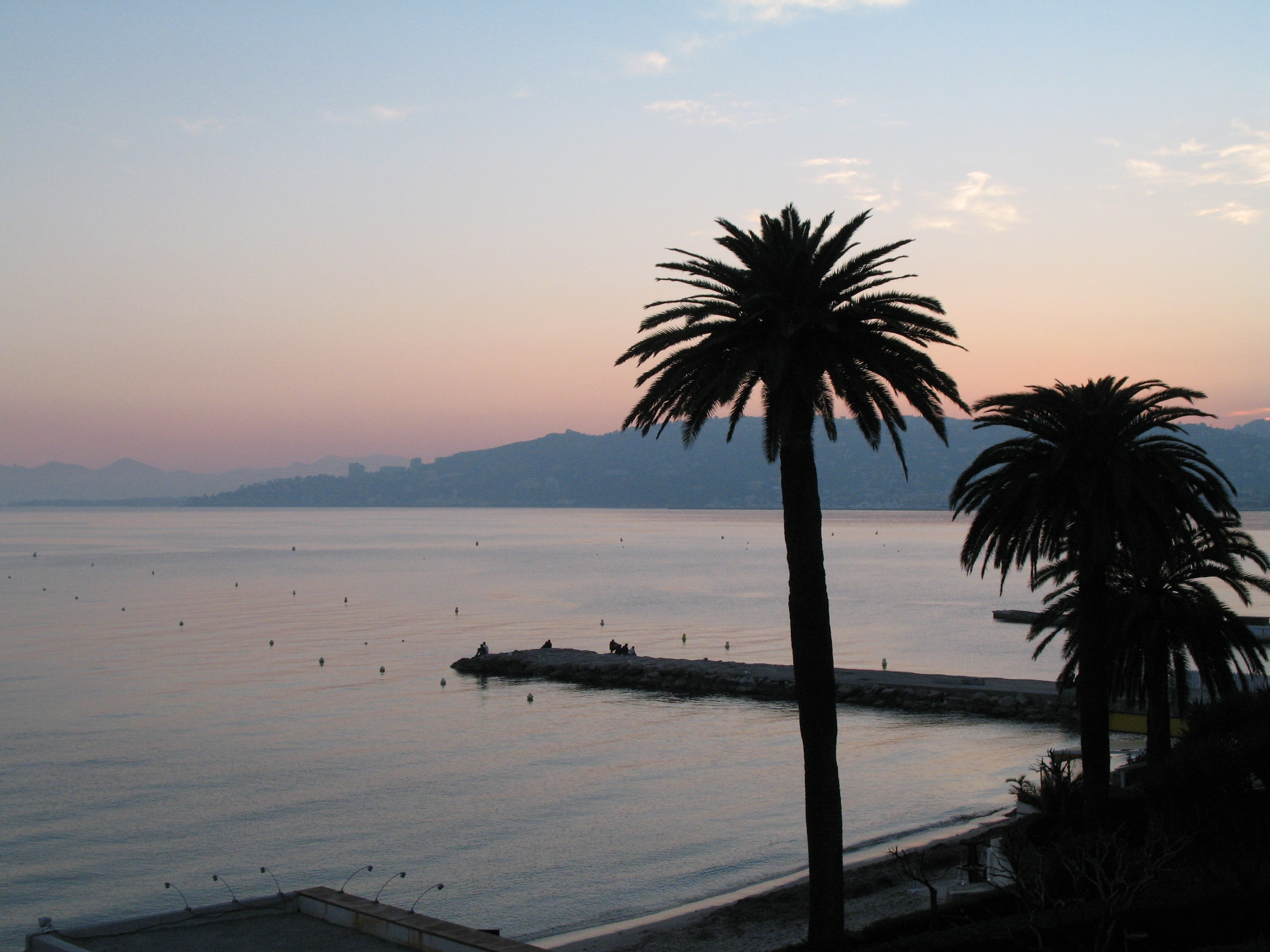
- View of the Golfe Juan on which the château was built
- Interactive map of Château de l'Horizon
- Location: Vallauris, Provence-Alpes-Côte d'Azur, France
- Coordinates: 43°33′17″N 7°03′44″E
- Designer: Barry Dierks
- Type: Villa
- Completion date: 1932

The château de l'Horizon is a Modernist villa that was constructed in 1932 by the American architect Barry Dierks for the actress Maxine Elliott. The villa is located on shores of the Golfe-Juan at Vallauris.

The residence has received a number of distinguished guests, including Sir Winston Churchill, who was a regular guest between 1934 and 1940. Prince Ali Khan purchased the villa in 1948 and his marriage to Rita Hayworth was celebrated here the following year.

== History ==
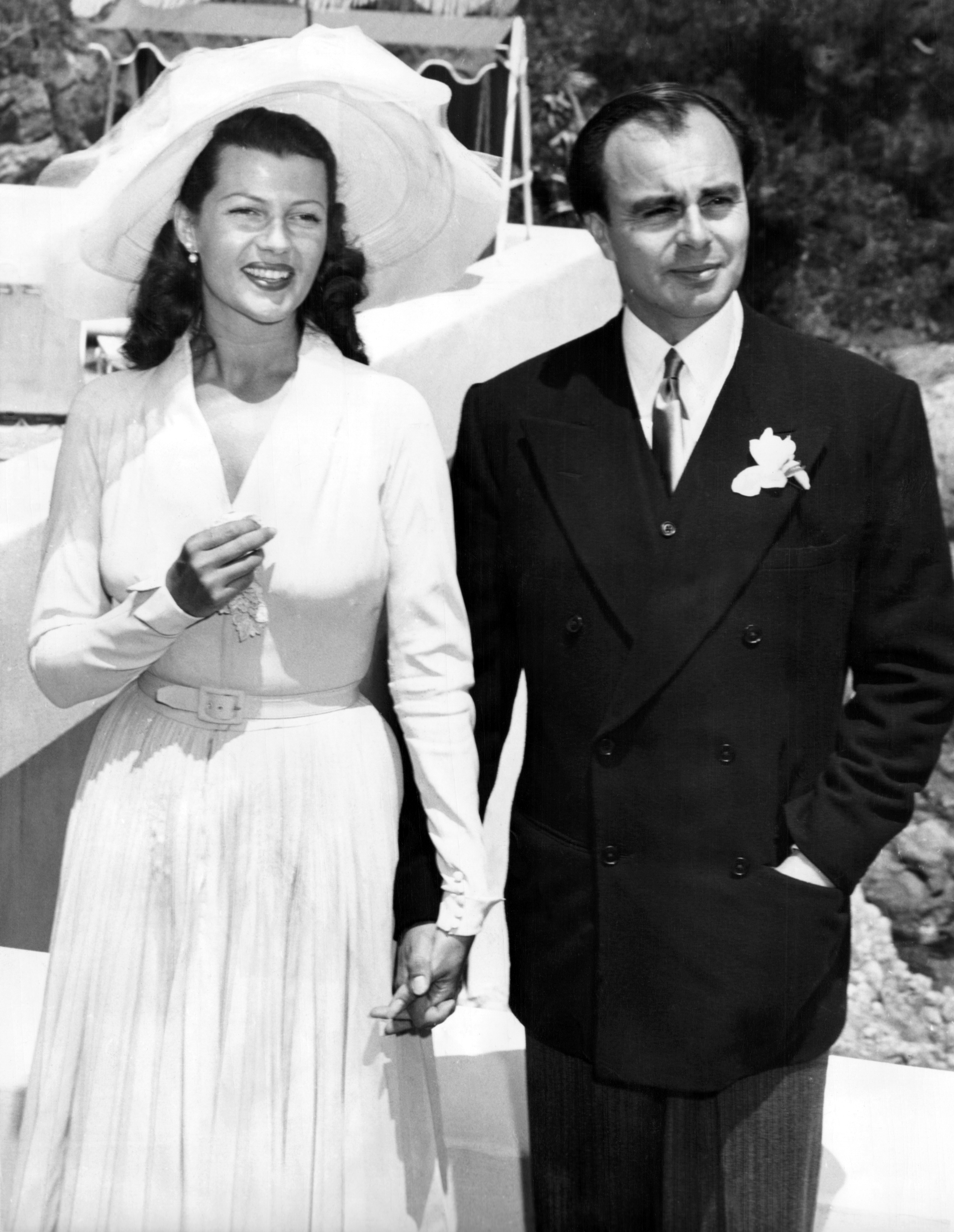
Rita Hayworth and Prince Aly Khan at their wedding reception in the garden of the Château de l'Horizon (May 27, 1949)

In 1932, Maxine Elliott (1868–1940) built directly on coast of the Golfe-Juan an imposing villa, which the magazine Punch later described as "a white palace set on the water." Endowed with an acute business sense and a passion for society, the actress spent $350,000 at the time for this structure anchored on the rocks with its private port. Elliott named the villa "château de l'Horizon."

In her new summer residence Maxine Elliott received many celebrities of the day such as Lloyd George and the Duke and Duchess of Windsor. Sir Winston Churchill came regularly on vacation to paint and to finish his biography of the Duke of Marlborough. In his memoires, Noël Coward recounted the dinners and the arrivals of guest by boat on the jetty of the villa.

Elsa Maxwell claimed – albeit without providing sources – that on the eve of the Second World War, the villa served as a meeting place for Anthony Eden, British minister of Foreign Affairs, and his French and Italian homologues.

Maxine Elliott died in 1940. After the war, the villa was rented for a time by Rosita Winston, wife of the American millionaire Norman K Winston. She maintained the social traditions established by Elliott by giving dinner parties of 20 to 30 guests, which included Greta Garbo, Jack L. Warner or Maurice Chevalier. Her husband maintained, however, not to have "the faintest idea who they are or how they got invited. The trouble is that they all know each other so damn well."

In 1948, the villa was purchased by Prince Ali Khan, the eldest son and heir to the Aga Khan III. Under the leadership of Elsa Maxwell, international café society as well as the "aristocracy of the French Riviera" continued to make the villa a center of attention for the press. On May 27, 1949, after the prince married Rita Hayworth at the Vallauris town hall, a lavish reception was held at the villa: the swimming pool was perfumed with eau de Cologne with the initial of the couple – made from flowers – floating on the surface of the water. After the death of Ali Khan on May 12, 1960, in an automobile accident, his body was temporarily interred in the villa's garden while waiting for the construction of a mausoleum in Syria (the remains were transferred from the villa in 1972).

In 1979, the heir to the Saudi throne, the future King Fahd, acquired the villa

== Description ==
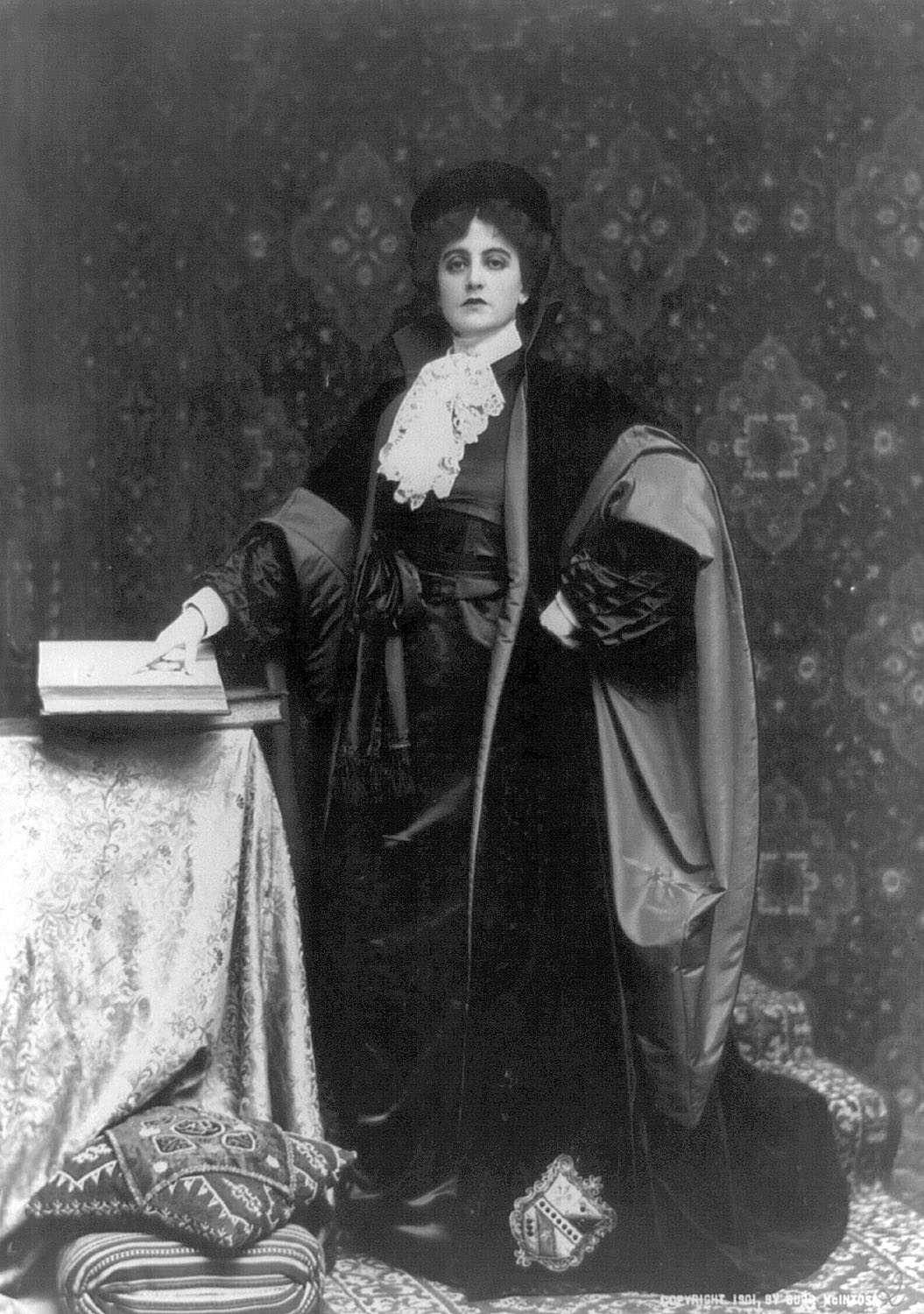
Actress Maxine Elliott (c. 1901 in her celebrated role of Portia in The Merchant of Venice), owner of château de l'Horizon.

According to the study published in 2004 in the magazine In situ (publication of the ministère français de la Culture), the château de L'Horizon is "one of the masterworks of Barry Dierks." Here, the architect created an imposing complex of buildings – all standing in perfect harmony with one another – consisting of a main building of four stories, annexes, a private port, and gardens designed by Dierks himself – which was a hallmark of the architect.

The property, which is wedged between the Route du bord de mer (D 6098) and the coast, extends along the coast. Dierks utilized this topography to design a long building of which nearly all of the rooms open to the sea and the horizon, hence the name of the villa.

For this reason, the entry façade – visible from the roadway – has very few openings: Frédéric Mitterrand speaks of a "forbidding view from the roadway and the railway tracks" but a sumptuous approach from the sea.

Seen from the coast, the extended line of the main building seems to be constructed on the jagged pink rocks. The villa consists of a central corps surrounded by two short wings, all of which are set on a terrace. On the eastern side of the villa, a recessed wing opens, whose joining to the main building forms a square tower. The façades are of white stucco and pierced by numerous openings which create covered arcaded galleries.

The property being on a downward slope, the entry level is on the first floor of sea-side of the villa (the gardens, swimming pool, and the salons frais (garden rooms) are on the ground floor). The entry level is given over entirely by the reception rooms and service areas. The upper floor includes ten bedrooms and seven bathrooms. On the uppermost floor (3rd floor from the entry; 4th floor from the sea-side), which has direct access from the terraces, is a salon and an arcaded loggia

The swimming pool, of a size uncommon in 1932, is a long rectangle that extends the length of the main building parallel with the coast and overlooks the sea. This architectural statement, seen from the villa, is spectacular. A white monumental staircase descends from the swimming pool to the shore.

According to British writer Mary S. Lovell, since becoming property of the Saudi royal family, the Château de L'Horizon has been expanded and altered almost beyond recognition.
