= Barry Dierks =

American architect

- Born: 1899; Pittsburgh, Pennsylvania (US)
- Died: February 20, 1960 (aged 60–61)
- Education: Carnegie Institute of Technology; École des beaux-arts de Paris
- Occupation: Architect
- Known for: Residences in the Modernist style on the French Riviera
- Partner: Colonel Eric Sawyer

Barry Dierks (1899 – February 20, 1960) was an American architect of the Modernist movement. He was active in France, principally on the French Riviera from 1925 to the 1950s.

== Biography ==
Son of W. C. Dierks, managing director of C. C. Mellor pianos, Barry Dierks studied architecture at Carnegie Institute of Technology in Pittsburgh, from which he obtained his diploma in 1921. He continued his studies at the École des beaux-arts in Paris in the studio of Léon Jaussely.

The need to guarantee his stay in France led him to accept a job at the Bank Choillet. Here, he made the acquaintance of the bank's director, Colonel Eric Sawyer, former officer in the British Army, who became his lover and lifelong companion. In 1925, the two decided to leave and establish themselves in the south of France. This carefully considered decision was based on Dierks' profession and the growing demand for country houses in a region where wealthy clients – many of whom were British – built.

At Théoule-sur-Mer, in the Alpes-Maritimes, he discovered a 6,000 square metres (65,000 sq ft) isolated site on a private peninsula on the Pointe de l’Esquillon with an inaccessible cove and a private beach where they built their house, the villa Le Trident. This first effort was noticed by Eric's friends and became the emblem of Dierks’ savoir-faire.

Between 1925 and 1960, the year of Dierks’ death, more than 100 commissions – designs as well as remodeling and enlargements of existing villas – have been tallied. His client base, made up of aristocrats, artists, and business leaders, seemed to have been built by word of mouth. Dierks and his partner were active participants in the social life of the French Riviera.

Dierks' wealthy clientele found his work appealing for its restrained modernity. The architect set out to design elegant and functional buildings, where the views and the light of the Mediterranean were highlighted.

During the Second World War, Barry Dierks conducted humanitarian operations before leaving the regions, and Eric Sawyer joined the Resistance. In 1946, General Georges Catroux noted his consideration, in this respect, in a eulogistic note in the guestbook of the villa Le Trident.

In 1956, Dierks' leg was amputated following an illness. He died on February 20, 1960, with Eric Sawyer surviving him until 1985.

Riviera Dreaming, the authorised biography of Barry Dierks by Maureen Emerson was published in 2018. LB Tauris Ltd ISBN 978-1-78831-162-5

== Achievements ==
According to a study published in 2004, 102 construction sites led by Dierks have been reported. Among these commissions, 66 were for British clients and 25 were for French clients. Nearly one-quarter of the villas built were for aristocrats.

The following table presents a partial list of works by Barry Dierks

| Date | Name | Client | Address | IGPC |
|---|---|---|---|---|
| 1925 | Villa Le Trident | Barry Dierks | 8, impasse Renoir, Théoule-sur-Mer | |
| 1927 | Villa La Mauresque | Somerset Maugham | 52, boulevard du Gal-de-Gaulle, Saint-Jean-Cap-Ferrat | n° IA06000981 |
| 1928 | Villa La Reine Jeanne | Paul-Louis Weiller | Hameau de Cabasson, Bormes-les-Mimosas | |
| 1930 | Villa Saint-Ange | Hedwige d’Ursel | Le Brusc, Six-Fours-les-Plages | n° IA83000435 |
| 1932 | Château de l'Horizon | Maxine Elliott | Route du Bord-de-mer, Golfe-Juan, Vallauris | |
| 1932 | Domaine de L'Oustaroun | Marquise de Brantes | 763, chemin des Salles, Vence | |
| 1932 | Villa Les Aspres | Marquise de Ganay | Grasse | |
| 1933 | Manoir Eden Roc | Marquess of Cholmondeley | Golfe-Juan | |
| 1936 | Villa Lilliput | Amiral-comte Antoine Sala | 40, boulevard James-Wyllie, Antibes | n° IA06001101 |
| 1937 | Villa Lou Vieï | Herman Rogers | 10 bis, ancien chemin de Vallauris, Cannes | n° IA06000561 |
| 1937 | Villa Zéro | Mrs. Grant Milnes | 416, chemin de la Mosquée, Antibes | n° IA06001165 |
| 1937 | Villa Sous le Vent | Mrs. Sidney Allen | impasse Félix, Antibes | n° IA06001166 |
| 1937 | Mas de Terrafial | Frederick Price | 3, avenue Ziem, Cannes | n° IA06000364 |
| 1937 | Villa Tanah Merah | George Benjamin Edward Keun | 64, avenue des Pins, Antibes | n° IA06001245 |
| 1937 | Villa Le Beaurevoir | Diarmid Campbell-Johnson | 450, avenue Mrs.-L.-D.-Beaumont, Antibes | n° IA06001174 |
| 1938 | Pavillon de bains | M. and Mme Boissevain | 365, chemin de la Mosquée, Antibes | n° IA06001175 |
| 1938 | Villa Aujourd'hui | Mrs. Audrey Chadwick | 1546, boulevard Maréchal-Juin, Antibes | n° IA06001178 |
| 1939 | Villa Ad Astra | Général Catroux | 13, avenue Ziem, Cannes | n° IA06000365 |
| 1939 | Villa La Cassine | Comte Damien de Martel | 112 bis, boulevard Francis-Meilland, Antibes | n° IA06001187 |
| 1940 | Villa Casa Lauretta | Grace Moore | Mougins | |
| 1940 | Villa Casa Estella | Mrs. Aubrey Cartwright | impasse Félix, Antibes | n° IA06001164 |
| 1940 | Villa Aigue-Marine | Howard Wilcox | 490, chemin de la Mosquée, Antibes | n° IA06001236 |
| 1940 | Villa Patenôtre | Raymond Patenôtre | 38, boulevard Montfleury, Cannes | n° IA06000568 |
| 1940 | Clos de la Garoupe | Lord and Lady Norman | 1311, chemin de la Garoupe, Cap d'Antibes | n° IA06001210 |
| 1950 | Villa Le Clocher | Lord and Lady Norman | 1472, chemin de la Garoupe, Antibes | n° IA06001154 |
| 1950 | Cottage d'Eilenroc | Mr. and Mrs. Beaumont | 460, avenue Mrs. L-D Beaumont, Antibes | n° IA06001161 |
| 1951 | Villa Hier | Anthony Edgar Somers | 374, avenue Mrs. L-D Beaumont, Antibes | n° IA06001173 |
| 1952 | Villa La Folie | Willoughby Norman | chemin de la Croé, Cap d'Antibes | n° IA06001211 |
| 1952 | Cottage de la Garoupe | Lord and Lady Norman | 1530, chemin de la Garoupe, Cap d'Antibes | n° IA06001153 |
| 1956 | Villa Piccola Bella | Mme G.L.P. Woodward | 122, avenue de Vallauris, Cannes | n° IA06000628 |
| 1958 | Villa Moschetti | Joseph Moschetti | 18, rue Boucicaut, Cannes | n° IA06000620 |
| 1960 | Villa du Bord de mer | Lord and Lady Norman | 1472, chemin de la Garoupe, Antibes | n° IA06001221 |
