= Aly Khan =

Diplomat and socialite (1911–1960)

Prince Aly Aga Khan
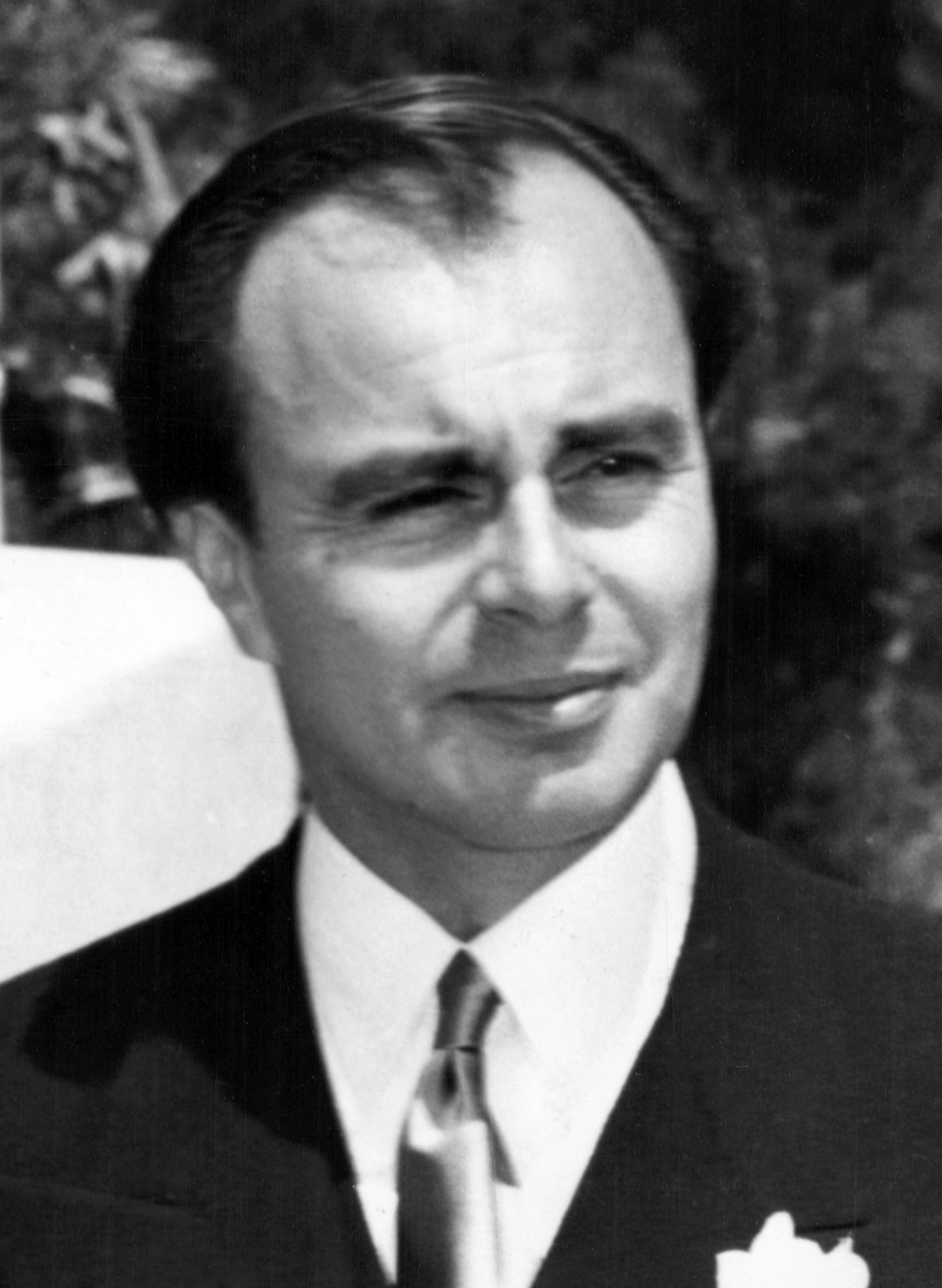
- Aly Khan in 1949

Vice President of United Nations General Assembly
- In office 17 Sep 1958 – 12 May 1960

3rd Permanent Representative of Pakistan to the United Nations
- In office 6 Feb 1958 – 12 May 1960
- Preceded by: Patras Bokhari
- Succeeded by: Sir Muhammad Zafrulla Khan

Personal life
- Born: 13 June 1911 Turin, Italy
- Died: 12 May 1960 (aged 48) Suresnes, France
- Resting place: Salamiyah, Syria
- Spouse: Joan Yarde-Buller (m. 1936; div. 1949) Rita Hayworth (m. 1949; div. 1953)
- Children: Karim al-Hussaini; Amyn Muhammad; Yasmin Aga Khan
- Parent(s): Sultan Muhammad Shah (father); Cleope Teresa Magliano (mother)

Religious life
- Religion: Shia Islam
- Denomination: Isma'ilism
- School: Nizari Ismaili
- Lineage: Fatimid

Prince Aly Salomone Aga Khan (13 June 1911 – 12 May 1960) was an Ismaili Sayyid who served as Pakistan's ambassador to the United Nations. He was the son of Sultan Muhammad Shah (Aga Khan III), and the father of Karim al-Hussaini (Aga Khan IV).

A socialite, racehorse owner and jockey, he was the third husband of actress Rita Hayworth. After being passed over for succession as the Aga Khan, he served as the Permanent Representative of Pakistan to the United Nations from 1958 to 1960, where he became a vice president of the General Assembly.

== Birth and education ==
Aly Khan was born in Turin, Italy, the younger son and only surviving child of Sultan Mohammad Shah (who served as the titular Aga Khan III) and Italian danseuse étoile Cleope Teresa Magliano (born Cleofe Teresa "Ginetta" Magliano, sister of ballet dancer Emma Magliani). His father was born in Karachi, British India (in modern-day Pakistan). His paternal grandparents were born in Iran. He had two brothers: Mohammed Mahdi Khan, known as "Giuseppe" (who died in 1911), and, by his father's third marriage, Sadruddin Aga Khan. Aly Khan was educated by private tutors in India and France during his childhood. He later trained in England as a lawyer. As a 12-year-old boy, he knew Orson Welles, who was approximately four years younger. Welles and Khan both married Rita Hayworth, becoming her second and third husbands, respectively. When Aly was 15, his mother died following an operation on 1 December 1926. His father subsequently remarried in 1929.

== Military service and honours ==
In 1939, Aly Khan joined the French Foreign Legion and served with its cavalry division in Egypt and the Middle East. In 1940, he joined the Royal Wiltshire Yeomanry, becoming a lieutenant colonel in 1944. That year, he participated in the Allied landing in the south of France with the United States Seventh Army, serving as a liaison officer with the rank of captain; for this, he was made an officer in the Legion of Honour in 1950.

He also was awarded the Croix de Guerre and the United States Bronze Star Medal.

Khan was installed as the 1st Colonel of the Regiment of the newly raised 4 Cavalry Regiment (1 November 1956), Pakistan Army in a military ceremony during 1957. He retained this honour until his death.

== Ambassador of Pakistan to the United Nations ==
In November 1957 Aly Khan met President Iskander Mirza of Pakistan and was offered a post as the country's Ambassador to the United Nations. The formal announcement of the appointment was made on 6 February 1958.

As a member of the United Nations Political and Security Committee representing Pakistan, Khan's brief U.N. posting was viewed with surprise by many observers, some of whom considered him "the Asian-African answer to Irene Dunne", an American movie star not known for her political skills; Dunne had recently been designated a member of the United States delegation at General Assembly, largely in recognition of her Republican fundraising efforts.

Khan was elected as vice president of the United Nations General Assembly on 17 September 1958 and also served as chairman of the U.N.'s Peace Observation Committee.

== Personal life ==
Aly Khan was famously a man-about-town in his youth. "I had been involved with several women", he gamely told a reporter when asked about his life. His list of affairs included high-profile lovers such as the British debutante Margaret Whigham, later Duchess of Argyll, Thelma, Viscountess Furness, an American who was simultaneously involved with the Prince of Wales, British entertainer Joyce Grenfell and British socialite and hostess Pat Marlowe. Of his first wife, he remarked, "I was tired of trouble. Joan was a sane and solid girl, and I thought if I married her, I would stay out of trouble."

=== First marriage ===
Aly Khan was named co-respondent in the Guinness v Guinness and Khan divorce suit between Joan Barbara Guinness (née Yarde-Buller, 1908–1997; daughter of John Reginald Lopes Yarde-Buller, 3rd Baron Churston), and Group Captain Thomas Loel Guinness MP, a scion of the Guinness Brewery family. In 1935, Guinness sued for divorce, naming Khan as the "third party", he cited as evidence that his wife and Khan had occupied a hotel room together from 17 May until 20 May 1935, and that his wife had told him that she "had formed an attachment for (Khan) and desired her husband to divorce her". The case was uncontested, and Khan was ordered to pay all costs.

Khan and Joan Barbara Guinness were married in Paris on 18 May 1936, a few days after Guinness's divorce became absolute. Before the wedding, the bride converted to Islam and took the name Taj-ud-dawlah or "crown of the realm". The couple's first child, Karim al-Husseini, was born in Geneva seven months later, on 13 December 1936, and is said to have been a premature child. The couple also had a second son, Amyn Muhammad Aga Khan, who was also born premature at seven months the following year. Joan also had a son by her previous marriage, Patrick Guinness.

Khan and Joan divorced in 1949, in part due to his extramarital affairs with, among others, Pamela Churchill. After the divorce, Joan became the longtime mistress and eventual wife of the newspaper magnate Seymour Berry, 2nd Viscount Camrose. Khan married American actress Rita Hayworth within weeks of his divorce.

=== Second marriage and divorce ===
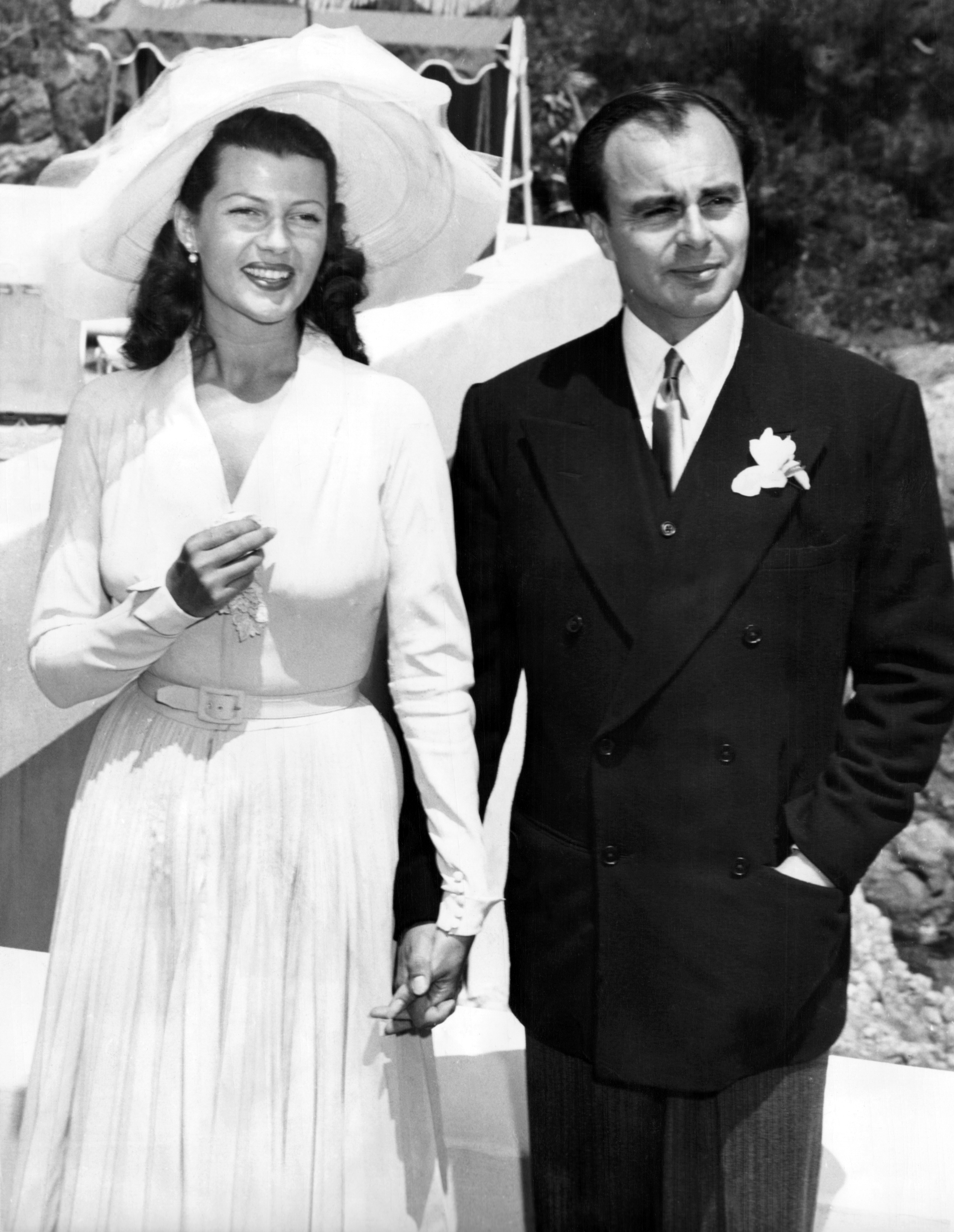
Rita Hayworth and Aly Khan at their wedding reception in the garden of the Château de l'Horizon, near Cannes (27 May 1949)

On 27 May (civil) and 28 May (religious) 1949, in Cannes, France, Aly Khan married American film star Rita Hayworth, who left her film career to marry him. Their daughter, Yasmin Aga Khan, was born on 26 December 1949.

Khan and his family were heavily involved in horse racing, owning and racing horses. Hayworth had no interest in the sport but became a member of the Del Mar Thoroughbred Club anyway. Her filly, Double Rose, won several races in France and finished second in the 1949 Prix de l'Arc de Triomphe.

In 1951, while still married to Hayworth, Khan was spotted dancing with the actress Joan Fontaine in the nightclub where he and his wife had met. Hayworth threatened to divorce him in Reno, Nevada, US. In early May, Hayworth moved to Nevada to establish legal residence to qualify for a divorce. She stayed at Lake Tahoe, Nevada with their daughter, saying there was a risk the child would be kidnapped. Hayworth filed for divorce from Khan on 2 September 1951, on the grounds of "extreme cruelty, entirely mental in nature."

Hayworth said she might convert to Islam, but did not. During the custody fight over their daughter Yasmin, Khan said he wanted her raised as a Muslim; Hayworth (who was raised a Roman Catholic) wanted the child to be a Christian.

Khan and Hayworth divorced in 1953. Hayworth rejected his offer of $1,000,000 if she would raise Yasmin in the Muslim faith from age seven and allow her to go to Europe to visit him for two or three months each year. Hayworth said:

Nothing will make me give up Yasmin's chance to live here in America among our precious freedoms and habits ... While I respect the Muslim faith and all other faiths it is my earnest wish that my daughter be raised as a normal, healthy American girl in the Christian faith. There isn't any amount of money in the entire world for which it is worth sacrificing this child's privilege of living as a normal Christian girl here in the United States. There just isn't anything else in the world that can compare with her sacred chance to do that. And I'm going to give it to Yasmin regardless of what it costs.

=== Engagement ===
While still married to Hayworth, Khan began a relationship with American film and stage actress Gene Tierney, whom he was engaged to marry in 1952; while Tierney mentioned their engagement a few times, it was never formally announced. His father, however, strongly opposed the union with another Hollywood actress. After a year-long engagement, Tierney separated from Khan and moved back to the United States to tend to her mental health. In the late 1950s Khan was known for dating the French top model Simone Micheline Bodin (who called herself Bettina Graziani). Khan persuaded her to retire from modelling and settle down. By 1960, Bettina and Khan were engaged and expecting a child, whom she miscarried after being in a car accident.

=== Inheritance skips a generation ===
On 12 July 1957, upon the reading of the will of the Aga Khan III, Aly Khan's eldest son, Karim Aga Khan, then a junior at Harvard University, was named Aga Khan IV and 49th Imam of the Ismailis. It was the second time that the descent from father to son was circumvented in the community's 1,300-year history. According to the Aga Khan's will, a statement of which was presented to the press by his secretary:

In view of the fundamentally altered conditions in the world in very recent years due to the great changes that have taken place, including the discoveries of atomic science, I am convinced that it is in the best interests of the Shia Muslim Ismaili community that I should be succeeded by a young man who has been brought up and developed during recent years and in the midst of the new age, and who brings a new outlook on life to his office.

== Racehorse owner and breeder ==
Aly Khan was the owner and breeder of racehorses in France, England and Ireland. Noel Murless, the champion trainer on multiple occasions in England, told his biographer "Apart from his immense charm, Aly was also highly intelligent, a first-class judge of a horse and of form and breeding. It is probably fair to say that, with his experience of international racing, he was the best judge of collateral form in the world, and his flair for pedigrees was unique."

Aga Khan III was a prominent racehorse owner and breeder. After the second world war, Aly Khan bought a half share in his father's racing interests. Early success for the partnership led to them heading the list of winning breeders from 1947 to 1949 and 1952.

== Death ==
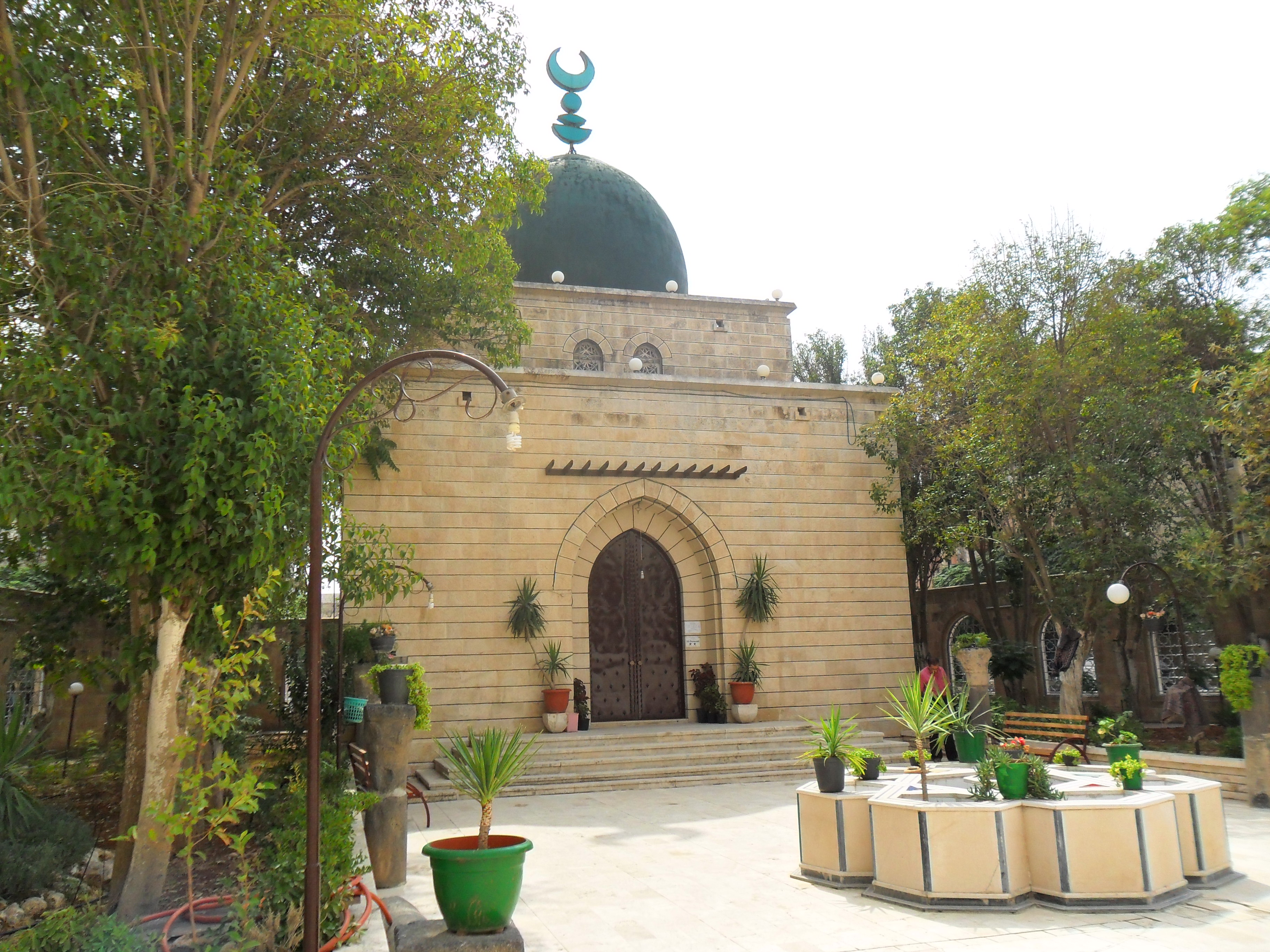
Aly Khan mausoleum in Salamiyah

On 12 May 1960, a little more than two years after his appointment as Pakistan's Ambassador to the UN, Aly Khan sustained catastrophic head injuries in an automobile accident in Suresnes, France, when the car he was driving collided with another vehicle at the intersection of boulevard Henri Sellier and rue du Mont Valerien, while he and his pregnant fiancée, Bettina, were heading to a party. He died shortly afterward at Foch Hospital (in Suresnes). Bettina survived with a minor forehead injury, though the shock of the accident resulted in a miscarriage. Khan's chauffeur, who was in the back seat, also survived, as did the driver of the oncoming car.

Khan was buried on the grounds of Château de l'Horizon, his home in the south of France, where it was intended that he would remain until a mausoleum was built for him in Syria. His remains were removed to Damascus, Syria, on 11 July 1972, and he was reinterred in Salamiyah, Syria.

His fortune went almost entirely to his children. The only beneficiaries of his will outside family and employees were Bettina, who received a US$280,000 bequest, Lord Astor (one of his closest friends) and Sybilla Szczeniowska Sorondo (née Sybilla Emilia hr. Mielżyńska h. Nowina, 1920–1978, daughter of Maciej Mielżyński (powstaniec śląski)), then a New York fashion designer, whom he met in Cairo in 1941, when she was the twenty-one-year-old wife of Jerzy Szczeniowski, a Polish diplomat, and her Cairo-born son, Marek, who received $14,000 and $56,000 respectively.

Writing in The Times a few days after his death Lord Astor paid him a tribute. "If one only knew Aly Khan by repute it was easy to preconceive a dislike towards him. When one met him it was impossible not to be stimulated and attracted by his charm, his perfect manners, his vitality, his gaiety and sense of fun. But if you were fortunate enough to know him really well, and have him as a friend, you acquired a friendship which was incomparable - generous, imaginative, enduring and almost passionately warm."

== In popular culture ==
Due to his well-publicized romances, Aly Khan was mentioned in a verse of Noël Coward's 1950s lyrics for Cole Porter's 1928 song "Let's Do It, Let's Fall in Love": "Monkeys whenever you look do it / Aly Khan and King Farouk do it / Let's do it, let's fall in love."

Lucille P. Markey, owner of Calumet Farm Thoroughbred racing stable in Lexington, Kentucky, named one of her outstanding colts, "Alydar" in his honor because she always addressed him as, "Aly Darling".

In the Season 5 episode of Mad Men, Christmas Waltz, Don Draper mentions that he thought Joan Harris was seeing Aly Khan, given the frequency of flower deliveries to her office. Later on in the episode, Joan Harris receives a bouquet of red roses (purportedly from Don Draper) with a note that says "Your mother did a good job – Ali Khan."

In the Honeymooners episode "The Golfer", which first aired on 15 October 1955, Alice Kramden – when her husband Ralph needs an excuse to not go golfing with his boss – exclaims, "Sure, you can always tell him you're going tiger hunting with Aly Khan."

He also appears in Dominick Dunne's 1985 novel The Two Mrs. Grenvilles.

== See also ==
- List of Ismaili imams
- Fatimids
- Isma'ilism
- Nizari

Diplomatic posts
Preceded by Patras Bokhari	Pakistan Ambassador to the United Nations; February 1958– May 1960	Succeeded by Muhammad Zafrulla Khan
