= Théoule-sur-Mer Castle =

Castle in Alpes-Maritimes, France

- Château de Théoule-sur-Mer
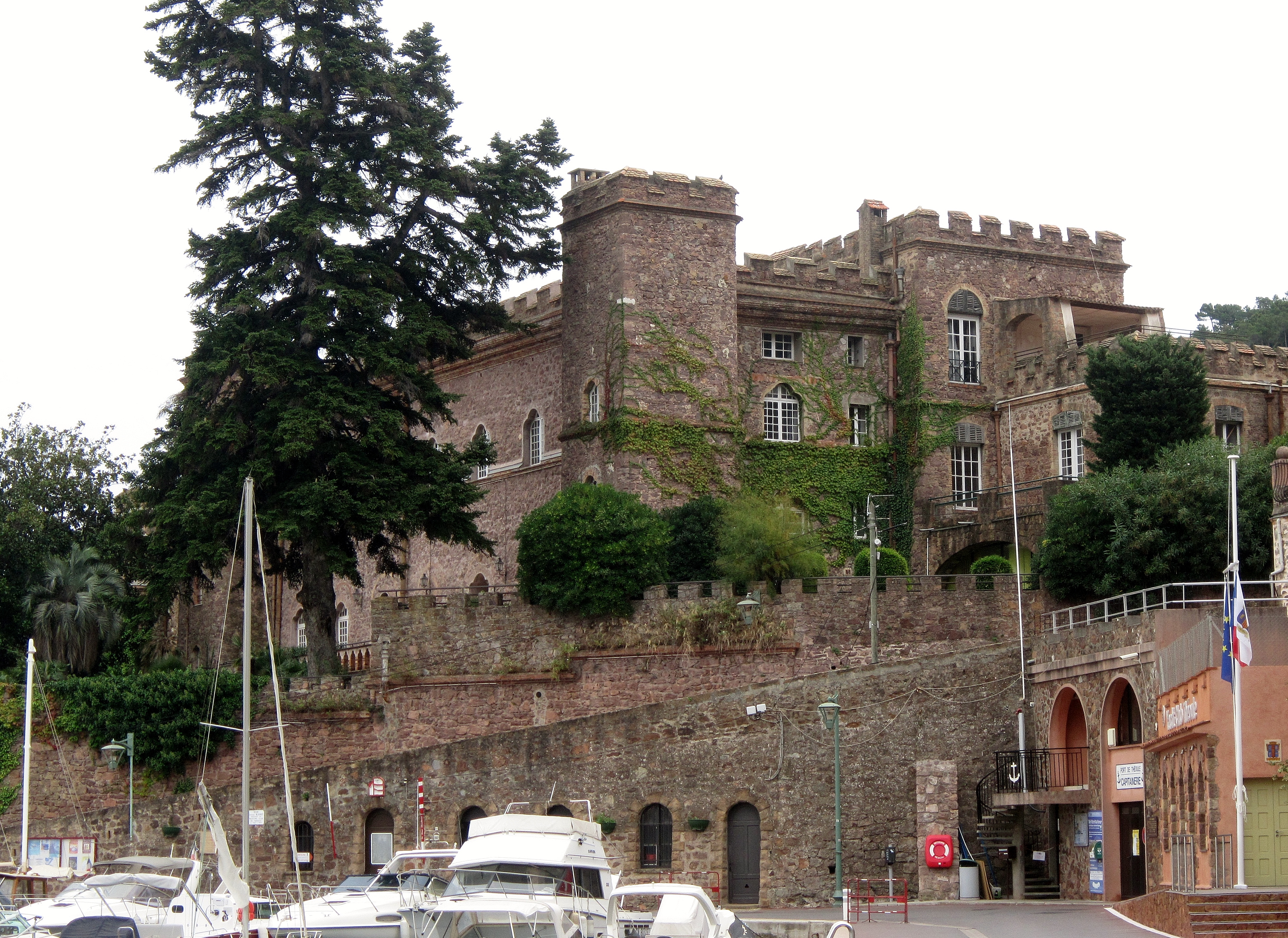
- Théoule-sur-Mer Castle in 2019
- Click on the map for a fullscreen view

General information
- Location: Théoule-sur-Mer, France
- Coordinates: 43°30′29.31″N 6°56′22.91″E

Théoule-sur-Mer Castle (French: Château de Théoule-sur-Mer) is a castle located in Théoule-sur-Mer, France.

== History ==
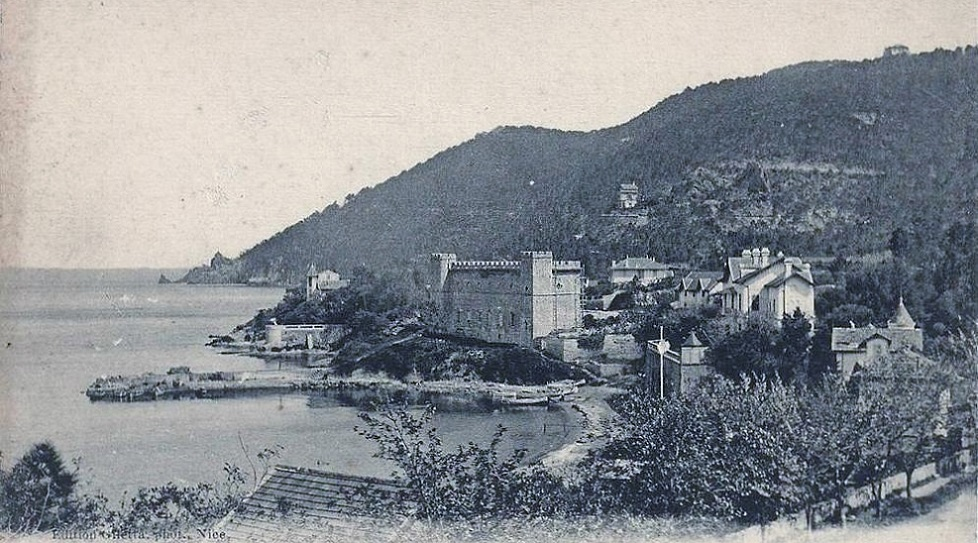
Théoule and its castle around 1910

The structure was built as a feudal soap factory, located by the sea in an area mainly devoted to fishing and part of the Théoule fishery, under the authority of the lords of Villanova, who ruled over the Gulf of La Napoule. Later, roof tiles and terracotta bricks were produced there. In the second half of the 19th century, however, the site's industrial activity went into decline.

The property was subsequently purchased by the Lyon press magnate Auguste Ferrouillat, who radically transformed its appearance: the factory's central roof was removed and walls were erected to give it the look of a noble residence. A prominent member of the Club des Lyonnais and president of the Théoule property owners' association for several years, Auguste sold the building in 1905 to Monsieur Jousseaud de la Lateulière, who died the following year. The residence then remained abandoned for almost a decade.

The estate was acquired in 1913 by the British nobleman Harry Crowford Leland de Langley, who initiated a new campaign of works to emphasize the building's romantic and residential character, turning it into a meeting place for Riviera high society in the years that followed.

In 1964, the château was purchased by industrial designer Henri Varnet, then head of design at Citroën. In 1972, the property was sold to the Caisse Centrale d'Activités Sociales, the mutual and social organization of the French gas and electricity industries, becoming a holiday resort for employees in the sector.

Since 2014, EDF's works council had been trying to sell the property, without finding buyers. The sale was finally completed on December 8, 2021, for €13.6 million. After more than two years of work and restoration, the château reopened in 2024 as a luxury hotel.
