= Hôtel de Ville, Mandelieu-la-Napoule =

Town hall in Mandelieu-la-Napoule, France

Hôtel de Ville
- The main frontage of the Hôtel de Ville in the early 20th century
- Interactive map of the Hôtel de Ville area

General information
- Type: City hall
- Architectural style: Neoclassical style
- Location: Mandelieu-la-Napoule, France
- Coordinates: 43.5427°N 6.9318°E
- Completed: c.1895

The Hôtel de Ville (French pronunciation: [otɛl də vil], City Hall) is a municipal building in Mandelieu-la-Napoule, Alpes-Maritimes, in southeastern France, standing on Rue Jean Monnet.

== History ==
=== The old town hall ===
In the second half of the 19th century, the town council met in the clergy house adjacent to the Church of Saint-Pons. It was in this building that the council welcomed the president of France, Armand Fallières, accompanied by the minister of the interior, Georges Clemenceau, in April 1909. This arrangement continued until the late 1920s, when the council led by the mayor, Laurent Gandolphe, decided to commission a combined town hall and school. The site they selected was on the north side of what is now Rue Charles de Mouchy. The building was designed in the neoclassical style, built in a mix of ashlar stone and rubble masonry and was completed in 1929.

The design involved a symmetrical main frontage of 11 bays facing onto what is now Rue Charles de Mouchy. The building was laid out in three parts, with the town hall in the main block, the girls' school in the left-hand wing and the boys' school in the right-hand wing. The main block consisted of three bays, while the wings were of five bays. The central bay of the main block, which was slightly projected forward, featured a round-headed window on the ground floor, a French door with a balcony on the first floor, a casement window on the second floor, and an oculus in the gable above. The other bays were fenestrated in a similar style. Following the liberation of the town by allied troops on 23 August 1944, during the Second World War, celebrations were held outside the old town hall. After the building was no longer required for municipal use, it became the local police station.

=== The current town hall ===
In the early 1980s, following significant population growth, the council led by the mayor, Louise Moreau, decided to acquire a more substantial building. The building they selected was the former Waldorf Hotel, which was sited on an elevated plateau overlooking the sea and had been commissioned as a luxury hotel for tourists in the late 19th century.

The building had been designed in the neoclassical style, built in brick with a cement render finish and had been completed around 1895. (Note: The building was probably completed several years after the completion of the Waldorf Astoria New York, which was opened in 1893.) The design involved a long symmetrical main frontage facing towards the sea. The central section of the three bays, which was projected forward, featured a wide porch. There were three square-headed windows on the first floor and three round-headed windows on the second floor. The wings were fenestrated by round-headed windows on the first two floors and by small square windows at attic level.

The hotel was converted into a private boarding school, "l'École de l'Estérel", in 1903. It was then acquired by Daisy, Princess of Pless, who converted into a venue for lavish events in 1910. It served as a military hospital for soldiers suffering from tuberculosis during the First World War and then reverted to use as a hotel known as "Le Golf Hotel" in 1924. During the Second World War, it was occupied by Italian troops and, later, by German troops and, from 1949, it was used by the Caisse d'allocations familiales, supporting local families. It was then bought by the council in May 1985. As part of the conversion, one of the new rooms created was the Salle du Conseil (council chamber).

== Sources ==
- "Notre Histoire" (PDF). MLN Magazine. 1 September 2009.
