= Villa La Reine Jeanne =

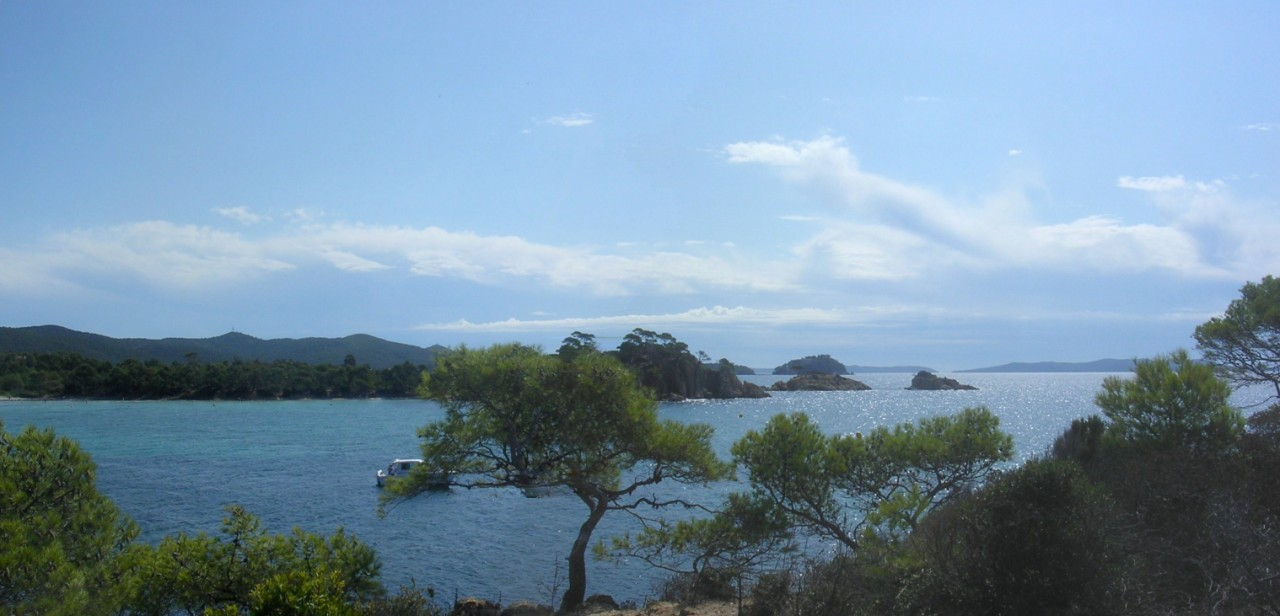
- View of the coast of the Var, near the villa
- Interactive map of Villa La Reine Jeanne
- Location: Bormes-les-Mimosas, Provence-Alpes-Côte d’Azur, France
- Coordinates: 43°09′09″N 6°20′38″E
- Designer: Barry Dierks
- Type: Villa
- Completion date: 1928

The villa La Reine Jeanne is an imposing holiday mansion, built in 1928 by the American architect Barry Dierks for the French industrialist Paul-Louis Weiller.

Located on 70 hectares (170 acres) of land in the village of Cabasson, in the commune of Bormes-les-Mimosas (Var), the property is near the Fort de Brégançon. It is renowned for having received numerous celebrities, stars, writers, monarchs, and heads of state, among whom Charlie Chaplin, Richard Nixon, King Juan Carlos of Spain, and Georges Pompidou are noted.

== History ==
In the mid-1920s, while searching for a place to build his summer home, Paul-Louis Weiller explored the French Riviera at the controls of an airplane. He discovered the site, located on the pointe de la Galère in the village of Cabasson at Bormes-les-Mimosas.

The area, which he purchased, extended over 70 hectares (170 acres), included a forest of maritime pines and cork oak trees near a beach, where, in 1347, queen Joanna I of Naples, comtesse de Provence disembarked. In 1928, Weiller commissioned Barry Dierks to build on the site a Modernist villa capable of accommodating 30 guests.

Until the year before his death in 1993, Weiller continued to receive at the villa La Reine Jeanne international dignitaries from the world of politics, arts and letters, as well as industrialists and giants of the financial world. During the summer of 1969, President Georges Pompidou, who was vacationing at the Fort de Brégançon, was a regular guest at his neighbor's dinner table.

Likewise, Grand Duke Jean of Luxembourg, who owned the adjoining villa, La Tour sarrasine, was a frequent guest. It was at Cabasson that Weiller's granddaughter, Sibilla, met Prince Guillaume of Luxembourg, youngest son of the Grand Duke. The two were married in 1994.

== Notable guests ==
Among those notables invited to the villa were:

- Juan Carlos I
- Elizabeth Taylor
- Richard Burton
- Charlie Chaplin
- Margrethe II
- Baudouin of Belgium
- Juliana of the Netherlands
- Gustaf VI Adolf
- Jean of Luxembourg
- Douglas Fairbanks
- Yul Brynner
- Laurence Olivier
- Aristotle Onassis
- Jean Seberg
- Vivien Leigh
- Merle Oberon
- Greta Garbo
- Jean-Paul Belmondo
- Roger Vadim
- Otto Preminger
- Paul Morand
- Paul Claudel
- André Maurois
- Aldous Huxley
- Maurice Genevoix
- Jean d'Ormesson
- Paul Getty
- Vincent Auriol
- Paul Reynaud
- Georges Pompidou
- Valéry Giscard d'Estaing
- Richard Nixon
- Herbert von Karajan
- Georges Auric
- Christiaan Barnard
- Maurice Herzog

== See also ==
=== See also ===
- Paul-Louis Weiller
- Barry Dierks
- Bormes-les-Mimosas
