= Pat Marlowe =

English socialite (1933–1962)

Pat Marlowe (1933 – 6 August 1962) was an English socialite, party hostess and actress who found minor fame in the 1950s and early 1960s. Her tragic death by suicide aged 28 in 1962, shortly after the death of Marilyn Monroe, caused reflection on the harsh reality of life for apparently glamorous young women striving for success in showbusiness.

== Early life and career ==
Anita Sonia Patricia Wimble was born in late 1933 in Chatham, Kent to Norah and Albert Wimble, a taxi hire proprietor. She left home for London aged fifteen to find success in the entertainment industry and changed her name to Pat Marlowe. She initially found work as a shop assistant, waitress and switchboard operator.

At some point, she landed a small part in a Tommy Trinder revue as a chorus girl ice skater and later featured as a "Corsican Girl" in musical Bet Your Life, starring Arthur Askey in 1952. Askey later described her as "A girl you would notice…[she was] very effervescent and on the ball".

She befriended showbiz entrepreneur and bandleader Jack Hylton in the early 1950s, with whom she had a lengthy relationship and who helped further her career.

She eventually changed her mind about becoming an actress and became a jetsetter and socialite, travelling between New York, Paris, Monte Carlo and the French and Italian Riviera. She was quoted as saying "I've decided on my career; I'm just going to get rich".

By the late 1950s Marlowe had become a party hostess and theatrical agent. The press described her as a shrewd businesswoman. Millionaires used her for projects with which they did not want to be associated, for which she received commission. She hosted parties described as "the talk of London". She held Wednesday night parties for prominent and clandestine gay men and later socialite parties at her home near the Dorchester Hotel.

== Personal life ==
Marlowe was a friend and possible protégé of society osteopath Stephen Ward. According to his friend Christine Keeler, Marlowe was romantically involved with Ward's friend Lord Astor and they used the cottage Ward rented from Astor at Cliveden.

After her early stage career had fizzled out, from the mid-1950s Marlowe featured in British gossip columns as an aspiring Hollywood actress and as a socialite.

In 1957 she appeared in American gossip columns when she was film producer Jack Warner's guest of honour at the Sayonara film premiere after-show party at the Mocambo nightclub in Hollywood. It was rumoured Warner wished her to sign to a film contract. Marlowe later claimed she was about to sign a seven year contract, but it did not come to fruition. Instead, she partook in a partying lifestyle that saw her appear at celebrity events around the world.

Marlowe's celebrity friends besides Hylton and Warner were reported to include Prince Aly Khan, who was said to "adore her" and whom she visited at his house in Sutton Place, Manhattan. She acted as a "feed" for comedian Bob Hope at show business parties; socialite Billy Wallace and Tommy Steele's manager John Kennedy dined with her and attended her parties. She was also friends with producer Mike Todd, singer Max Bygraves and restaurant owner Gerry Calvert.

She befriended novelist Graham Greene in Havana in October 1958, when they travelled by plane to New York, where a new Rolls Royce and a chauffeur awaited her at the airport. He later met up with her in Manhattan's Algonquin Hotel. Greene discovered she was "passionately fond of Havana, blue films and brothels."

In 1960 she drew up a contract for her memoirs to be published in the Sunday Pictorial newspaper. There was widespread interest among her Mayfair and Riviera friends about the disclosures. Suddenly, without explanation, she changed her mind. The manuscript was torn up and the contract cancelled.

Marlowe's son Stephen was born in 1961. His father was for some time suspected to be Hylton and his provision for the child fuelled the rumour. He remained friends with Marlowe long after their affair ended and helped when she fell into drug addiction. In 1987, a newspaper revealed the father to be Max Bygraves who had paid for a £10,000 trust fund in exchange for Marlowe's silence.

In 2019, bespoke Boucheron jewellery dated to having been made in 1958-60 by Aly Khan for Marlowe, whom he "had a liaison" with, which was left to a friend of Marlowe's was valued being worth around £20,000.

== Health issues and death ==
Marlowe suffered from depression. In May 1959, her doctor sent her to a nursing home to receive psychiatric treatment and electric shock therapy, after which she recovered. In January 1960 it was reported she had fallen down stairs at a hotel after accidentally taking sleeping pills, an incident later revealed to be a suicide attempt. She was treated for depression and talked out of suicide in November 1960 and again recovered.

On the morning of August 7, 1962, Marlowe was discovered dead in her bed at her house in Mount Row, Mayfair after a decorator heard and reported her fifteen month old son was found crying in his cot downstairs. PC Lawrence Burrell attended the call and climbed the fence of the mews to find the son, and subsequently the body in bed. She had probably died the previous evening from acute barbiturate and promethazine poisoning after overdosing on sleeping pills. Her death made news in both Britain and the United States, partly due to having happened two days after the death of Marilyn Monroe, in similar circumstances. Marlowe was reported to have known Monroe and to have been affected by her death. PC Lawrence Burrell later attended the inquest at Rochester Row to provide evidence into the death, which was initially thought to be murder due to the Profumo affair.

== Other entertainers called Pat Marlowe ==
At the time Pat Marlowe was active in the entertainment industry, there were several other actresses using the same name, who are sometimes confused with each other. In particular, Pat Marlowe of Squirrel Hill, Pittsburgh, was a dancer and sometime beauty queen born around 1929. She featured in Broadway musicals such as The Toplitzky of Notre Dame and had very similar brunette looks to the British Marlowe. Pat Marlowe, wife of actor Frank Marlowe was a stand-in actress of the late forties and early fifties. Another Pat Marlowe was a TV actress who had minor parts in shows such as Peter Gunn in the early 1960s.
