= Communauté d'agglomération Cannes Pays de Lérins =

Coordinates: 43.56°N 7.02°E

Cannes Pays de Lérins
- Communauté d'agglomération
- Country: France
- Region: Provence-Alpes-Côte d'Azur
- Department: Alpes-Maritimes
- No. of communes: {{{nbcomm}}}
- Established: 2014
- Area: 94.8 km^{2} (36.6 sq mi)
- Population (2018): 158,111
  - Density: 1,670/km^{2} (4,320/sq mi)

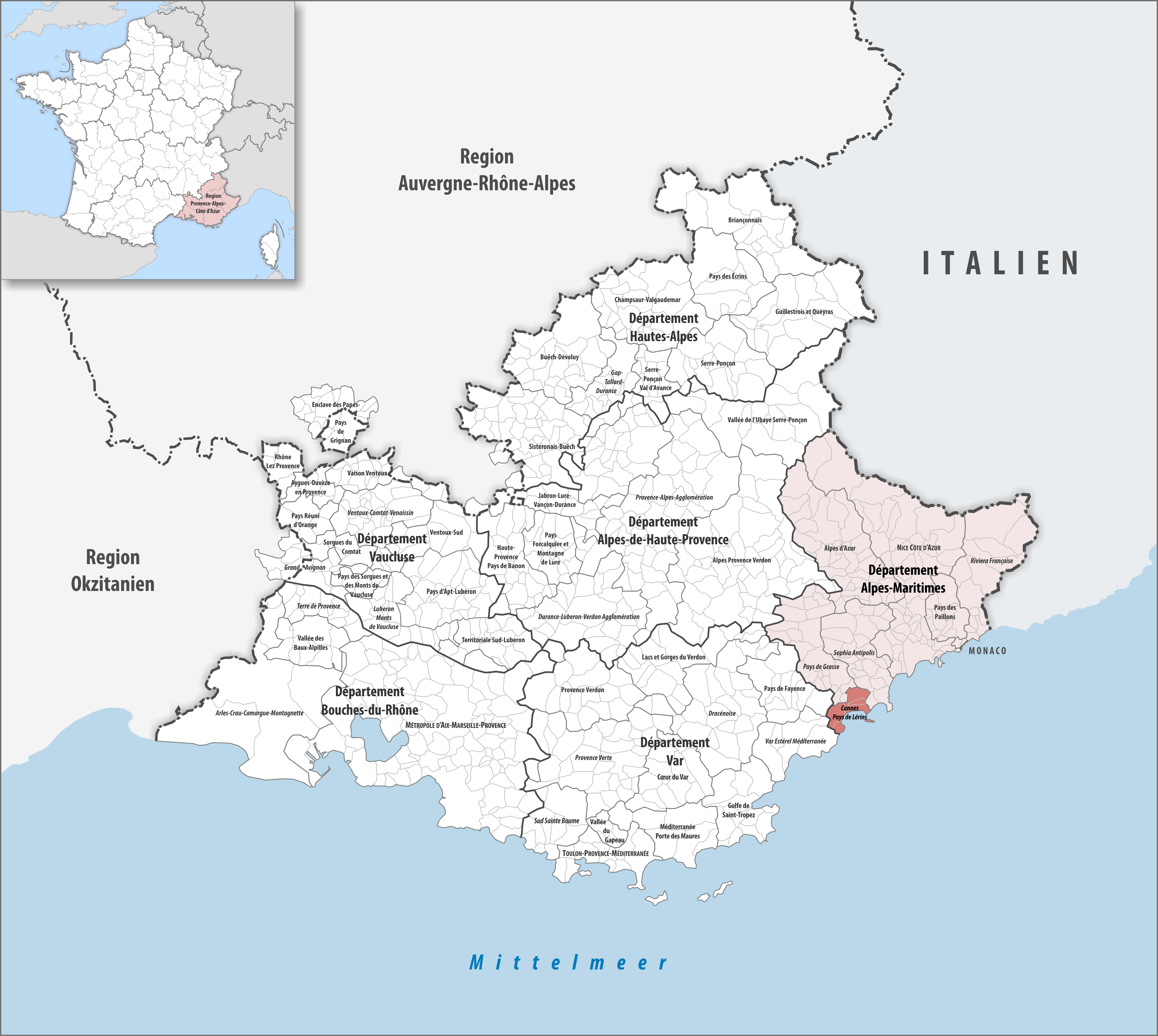
Cannes Pays de Lérins

Communauté d'agglomération Cannes Pays de Lérins is the communauté d'agglomération, an intercommunal structure, centred on the city of Cannes. It is located in the Alpes-Maritimes department, in the Provence-Alpes-Côte d'Azur region, southeastern France. It was created in January 2014. Its area is 94.8 km^{2}. Its population was 158,111 in 2018, of which 73,965 in Cannes proper.

== Composition ==
The communauté d'agglomération consists of the following 5 communes:

1. Cannes
2. Le Cannet
3. Mandelieu-la-Napoule
4. Mougins
5. Théoule-sur-Mer
