= Villa Le Trident =

Villa in Théoule-sur-Mer, France

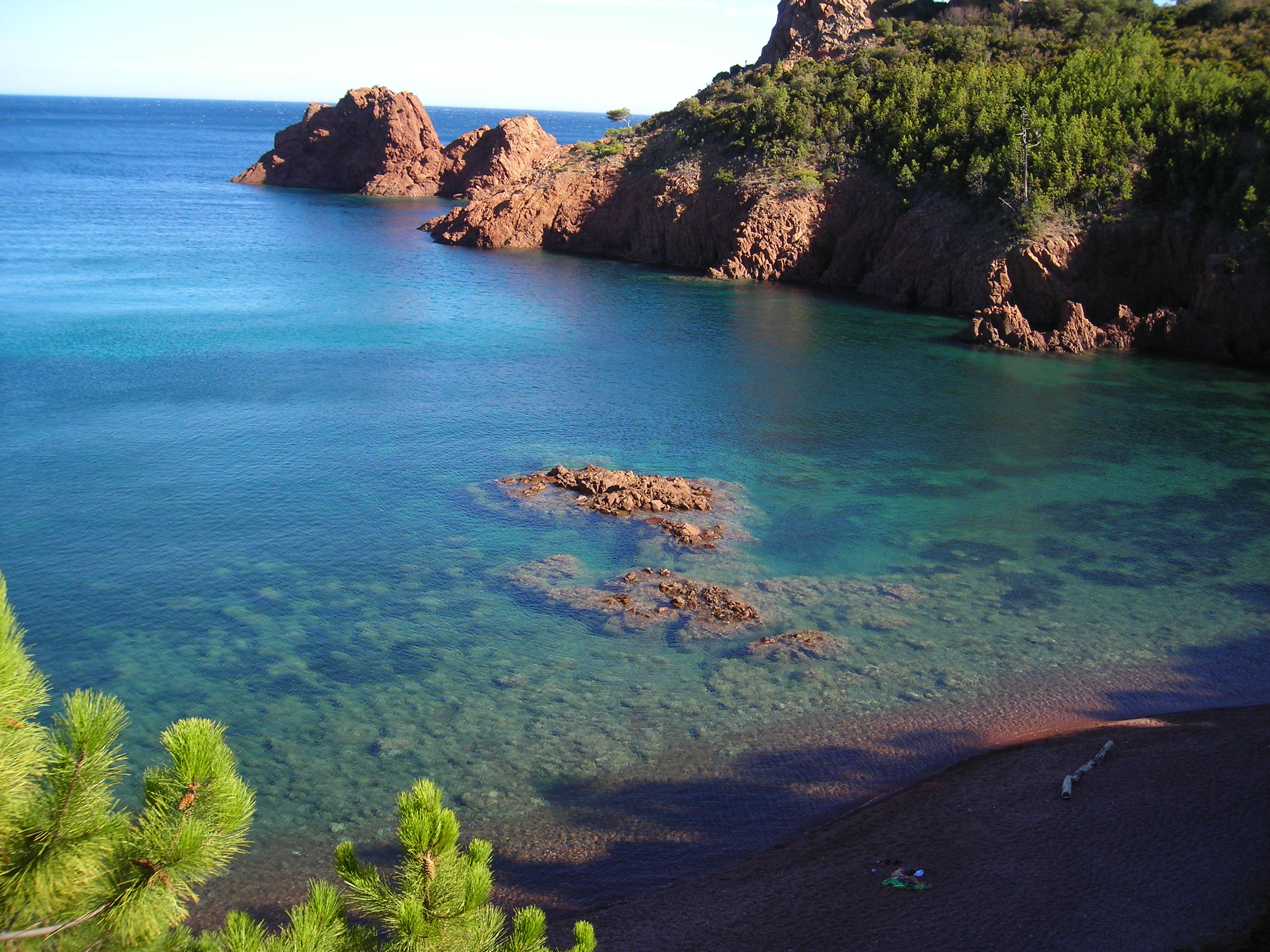
- View of the coast near the villa, not far from Théoule-sur-Mer
- Interactive map of Villa Le Trident
- Location: Théoule-sur-Mer, Provence-Alpes-Côte d’Azur, France
- Coordinates: 43°30′28″N 6°56′27″E
- Designer: Barry Dierks
- Type: Villa
- Completion date: 1925

The villa Le Trident is a Modernist villa built by the American architect Barry Dierks (1899-1960) for himself and his partner, Colonel Eric Sawyer on the pointe de l’Esquillon in Théoule-sur-Mer, Alpes-Maritimes on the French Riviera.

From the moment of its creation in 1925, this villa aroused the interest of cultivated Riviera society, which was searching for new talent. In a few years, Dierks became one of the most sought-after architects on the Riviera, where he built his reputation.

The guestbook of the villa includes such dignitaries of Riviera society as Picasso, Somerset Maugham, Noël Coward and the Duke and Duchess of Windsor.

== History ==
In 1925, the 26-year-old Dierks and his partner, Eric Sawyer (banker and ex-officer in the British army) decided to move to the South of France. Their choice brought them to the Riviera, a decision justified by Dierks’ profession and the growing construction demands by rich Americans in this region.

At Théoule-sur-Mer, in the Alpes-Maritimes, they discovered an 6,000 square metres (65,000 sq ft) isolated site on a small peninsula on the pointe de l’Esquillon with an inaccessible cove and private beach. This promontory on the sea provided a view that extended to the Bay of Cannes, the Massif de l'Esterel, and cap Roux; to the south, the view extended to Corsica.

Dierks, who had solid training in architecture and belonged to that generation of designers who adhered to the Modernist movement, built the villa in this style, which Noël Coward later characterized as "impossibly beautiful". Le Trident became both his residence and studio as well as the best example of his work.

Being well accepted by Riviera society, Dierks and his partner, who lived openly together, became “the darlings of the Riviera” and received many commissions. Today, there are 102 listed constructions by Dierks’ for clients ranging from Paul-Louis Weiller to the marquess of Cholmondeley, and from Louis II, Prince of Monaco to Maxine Elliott and General Catroux.

Most of his clients became his friends and were frequent guests at Le Trident.

In 1956, Dierks’ leg was amputated following an illness. He died on February 20, 1960, with Eric Sawyer surviving him until 1985. Sawyer bequeathed the villa to his nephew, whose children put the property up for sale in 2008 for a price of €20,000,000.

== Description ==
The villa was designed to follow the topography of the land with the house being accessed by some thirty steps below street level. The entry is on the same level as the bedrooms; the reception rooms and terraces are located on the level below. According to François Fray, cultural curator, most of the houses designed by Dierks followed this schema.

Le Trident features façades of white intonaco and roof terraces. Besides the salon, the dining room, loggia, and service areas there are seven bedrooms and five bathrooms that combine to create a living area of 385 square metres (4,140 sq ft). Several pieces of furniture were designed by Dierks that include bookcases and a large table covered with shagreen.

== Protection ==
The villa Le Trident is located at 8 impasse Renoire in Théoule-sur-Mer. The structure receives no protection under the Monument historique de France nor is it listed in the Inventaire général du patrimoine culturel (official listing of heritage sites in France).

== See also ==
- Barry Dierks
- Modernism
- Théoule-sur-Mer
