= Mandelieu-la-Napoule =

Commune in Provence-Alpes-Côte d'Azur, France

Mandelieu-la-Napoule Mandaluec la Napola (Occitan)
- Commune
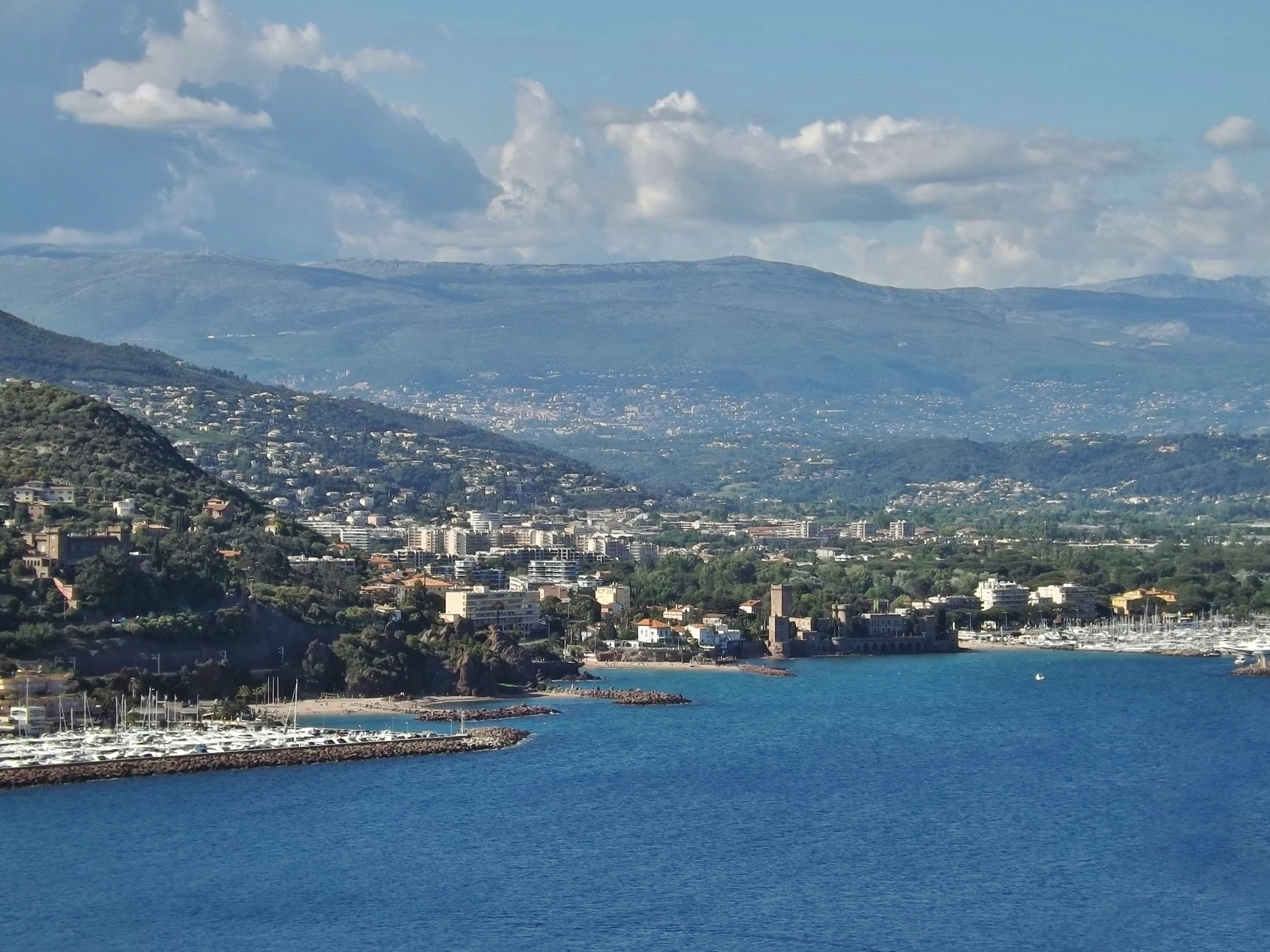
- View of Mandelieu-la-Napoule

- Coat of arms
- Location of Mandelieu-la-Napoule
- Location within France Location within Provence-Alpes-Côte d'Azur
- Coordinates: 43°32′47″N 6°56′17″E
- Country: France
- Region: Provence-Alpes-Côte d'Azur
- Department: Alpes-Maritimes
- Arrondissement: Grasse
- Canton: Mandelieu-la-Napoule
- Intercommunality: CA Cannes Pays de Lérins

Government
  - Mayor (2026–32): Sébastien Leroy (LR)
- Area^{1}: 31.37 km^{2} (12.11 sq mi)
- Elevation: 300 m (980 ft)
- Highest elevation: 486 m (1,594 ft)
- Lowest elevation: 0 m (0 ft)
- Population (2023): 21,640
  - Density: 689.8/km^{2} (1,787/sq mi)
- Time zone: UTC+01:00 (CET)
  - Summer (DST): UTC+02:00 (CEST)
- INSEE/Postal code: 06079 /06210
- ^{1} French Land Register data, which excludes lakes, ponds, glaciers > 1 km^{2} (0.386 sq mi or 247 acres) and river estuaries.

Mandelieu-la-Napoule (French pronunciation: [mɑ̃dəljølanapul]; Occitan: Mandaluec la Napola; locally spelled Mandelieu-La Napoule) is a commune in the Alpes-Maritimes department of the Provence-Alpes-Côte d'Azur region in Southeastern France. Located on the French Riviera, just to the southwest of Cannes and northeast of Théoule-sur-Mer, it had a population of 21,640 in 2023.

== Townscape ==
It is known for the Château de la Napoule, a fortified castle of the 14th century. In the 20th century, Henry Clews Jr (son of the wealthy New York banker Henry Clews) and his wife Marie Clews, entirely renovated the château which they then inhabited. Henry Clews Jr was a painter and sculptor whose work still fills the castle, which is now run as a non-profit arts foundation by his descendants. The château was once an ancient foundation, then a medieval fortress of the Counts of Villeneuve. Today the Roman Tower (4th century) and the Saracen Tower (11th century) are all that remain of the château that was destroyed during the French Revolution. The château designed by the Clews has cloister, terrace overlooking the Mediterranean Sea, Gothic dining room, and studio. In the basement of a tower at the château the remains of Henry (1876–1937) and Marie (1878–1959) are interred in two tombs that Henry designed and sculpted.

The Waldorf Hotel (now the Hôtel de Ville)

The Hôtel de Ville was built as a luxury hotel for tourists in the late 19th century.

== Population ==
Historical population

Year	Pop.	±% p.a.
1793	9	—
1800	33	+20.40%
1806	29	−2.13%
1821	89	+7.76%
1831	78	−1.31%
1836	111	+7.31%
1841	256	+18.19%
1846	305	+3.56%
1851	433	+7.26%
1856	334	−5.06%
1861	495	+8.19%
1866	423	−3.09%
1872	455	+1.22%
1876	423	−1.81%
1881	714	+11.04%
1886	835	+3.18%
1891	779	−1.38%
1896	984	+4.78%
1901	1,695	+11.49%

Year	Pop.	±% p.a.
1906	1,260	−5.76%
1911	1,517	+3.78%
1921	1,723	+1.28%
1926	2,376	+6.64%
1931	2,343	−0.28%
1936	2,342	−0.01%
1946	2,378	+0.15%
1954	2,962	+2.78%
1962	3,981	+3.77%
1968	6,124	+7.44%
1975	9,535	+6.53%
1982	14,283	+5.94%
1990	16,493	+1.81%
1999	17,870	+0.89%
2007	20,621	+1.81%
2012	22,714	+1.95%
2017	22,452	−0.23%
2023	21,640	−0.61%

Source: EHESS and INSEE (1968–2023)

== Transportation ==
Private air transportation for the town (and for nearby Cannes) is provided by Cannes - Mandelieu Airport. The nearest major airport is Nice Cote d'Azur Airport, the second busiest airport in France; it is about 30 minutes drive from the airport to the town. The commune is reached from exit 41 on the autoroute A8. Mandelieu-la-Napoule station is served by regional trains (TER Provence-Alpes-Côte d'Azur) towards Fréjus, Cannes, Nice and Les Arcs–Draguignan.

== Personalities ==
It is the home of ex MI6 agent Richard Tomlinson.

Bertrand of Orléans-Braganza was born in Mandelieu on 2 February 1941. He is the present head of the Vassouras Branch of the Brazilian Imperial House and de jure Emperor of Brazil (Bertrand I of Brazil). He is also considered a royal prince of the deposed monarchies of France and Portugal. His late brother Luiz of Orléans-Braganza was also born there three years before.

Italian Princess Maria Francesca of Savoy, daughter of the King of Italy Victor Emmanuel III and Queen Elena of Montenegro, lived in Mandelieu and died there on 7 December 2001.

Italian athlete Eddy Ottoz was born in Mandelieu on 3 June 1944. He competed for Italy in the 1964 Summer Olympics held in Tokyo, Japan and in the 1968 Summer Olympics in Mexico City, Mexico, where he won the bronze medal in the 110 metre hurdles event.

== Climate ==
On average, Mandelieu-la-Napoule experiences 5.7 days per year with a minimum temperature below 0 °C (32.0 °F), no days per year with a minimum temperature below −10 °C (14.0 °F), no days per year with a maximum temperature below 0 °C (32.0 °F), and 29.9 days per year with a maximum temperature above 30 °C (86.0 °F). The record high temperature was 39.4 °C (102.9 °F) on July 19, 2023, while the record low temperature was −4.3 °C (24.3 °F) on February 11, 2012.

Climate data for Mandelieu-la-Napoule (1991–2020 normals, extremes 1988–present)
Month	Jan	Feb	Mar	Apr	May	Jun	Jul	Aug	Sep	Oct	Nov	Dec	Year
Record high °C (°F)	21.8 (71.2)	24.2 (75.6)	28.0 (82.4)	27.7 (81.9)	32.4 (90.3)	38.1 (100.6)	39.4 (102.9)	39.2 (102.6)	34.3 (93.7)	31.3 (88.3)	26.6 (79.9)	22.4 (72.3)	39.4 (102.9)
Mean daily maximum °C (°F)	12.9 (55.2)	13.5 (56.3)	15.9 (60.6)	18.0 (64.4)	22.0 (71.6)	26.1 (79.0)	29.2 (84.6)	29.6 (85.3)	25.6 (78.1)	21.0 (69.8)	16.5 (61.7)	13.6 (56.5)	20.3 (68.6)
Daily mean °C (°F)	8.8 (47.8)	9.0 (48.2)	11.2 (52.2)	13.5 (56.3)	17.3 (63.1)	21.0 (69.8)	23.8 (74.8)	24.2 (75.6)	20.6 (69.1)	16.8 (62.2)	12.5 (54.5)	9.6 (49.3)	15.7 (60.2)
Mean daily minimum °C (°F)	4.7 (40.5)	4.5 (40.1)	6.6 (43.9)	8.9 (48.0)	12.5 (54.5)	16.0 (60.8)	18.4 (65.1)	18.8 (65.8)	15.6 (60.1)	12.6 (54.7)	8.5 (47.3)	5.5 (41.9)	11.0 (51.9)
Record low °C (°F)	−3.9 (25.0)	−4.3 (24.3)	−3.3 (26.1)	1.6 (34.9)	4.5 (40.1)	7.9 (46.2)	11.8 (53.2)	12.6 (54.7)	7.3 (45.1)	2.4 (36.3)	−2.9 (26.8)	−3.6 (25.5)	−4.3 (24.3)
Average precipitation mm (inches)	90.2 (3.55)	61.4 (2.42)	60.9 (2.40)	82.4 (3.24)	56.7 (2.23)	33.4 (1.31)	15.5 (0.61)	23.9 (0.94)	92.1 (3.63)	146.4 (5.76)	155.5 (6.12)	107.2 (4.22)	925.6 (36.43)
Average precipitation days (≥ 1.0 mm)	6.3	5.3	5.4	6.8	5.6	3.7	1.8	2.5	4.8	7.6	8.2	6.5	64.5
Source: Meteociel

== Gallery ==
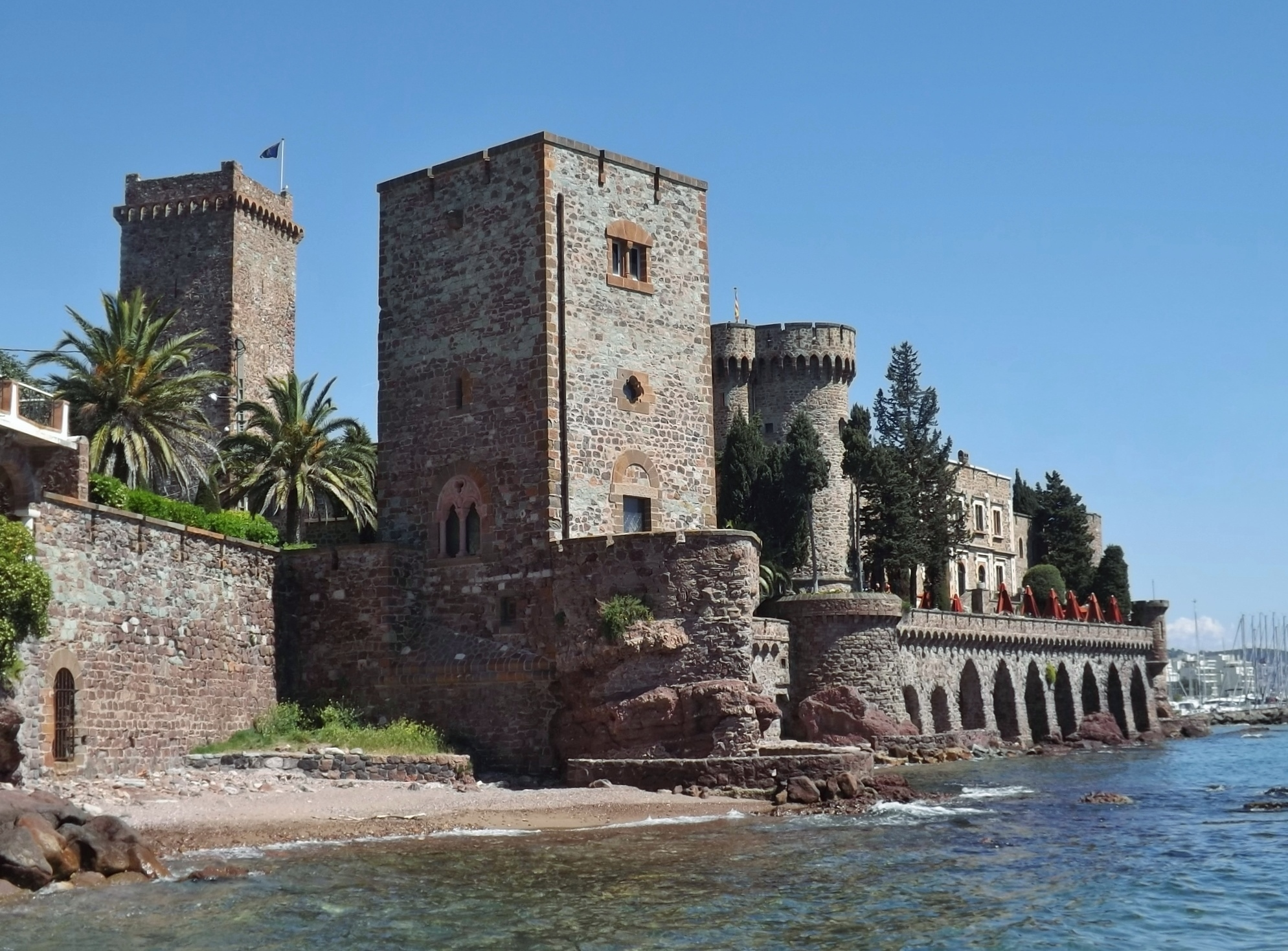
Château de la Napoule

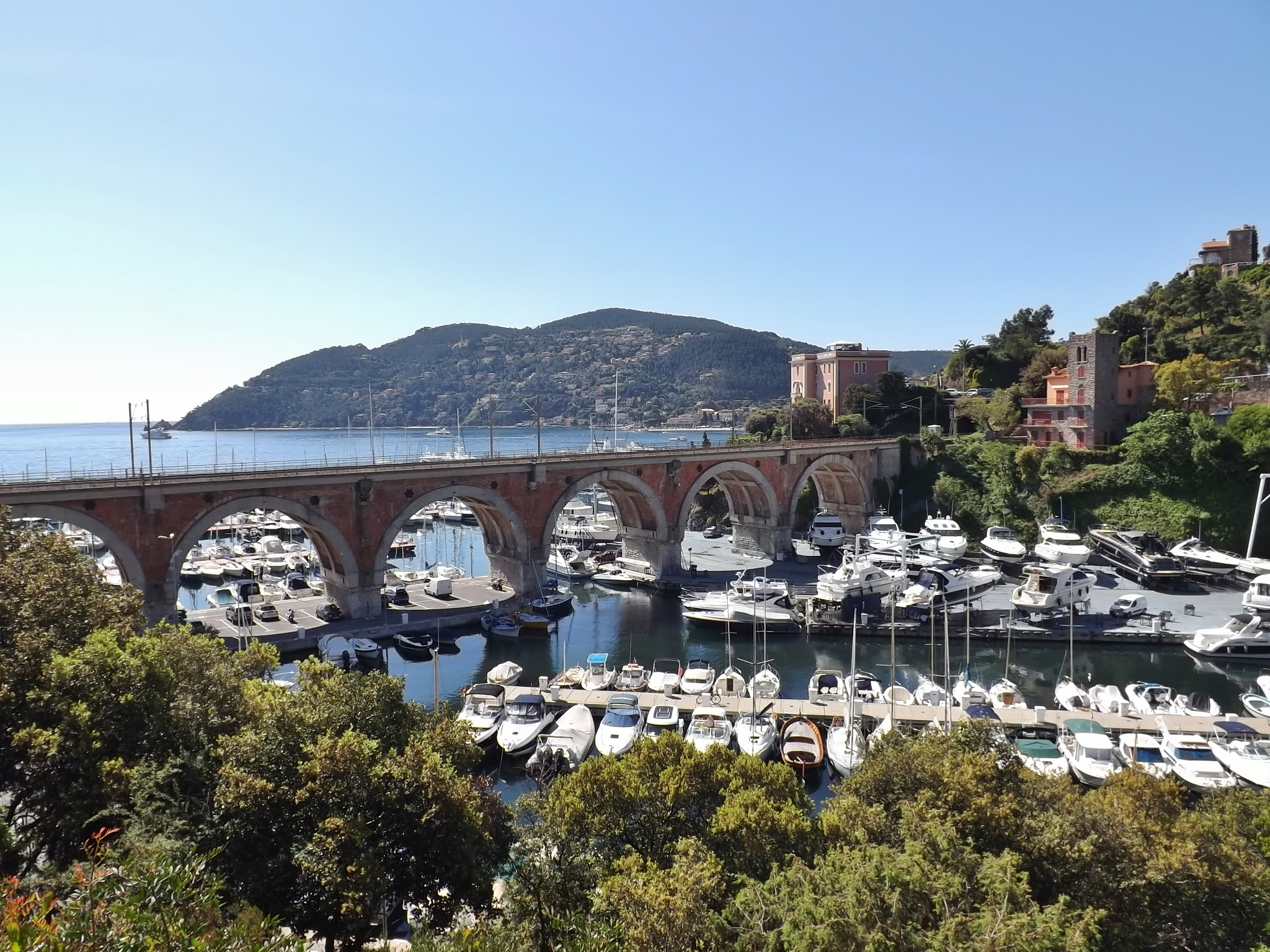
Viaduct and Port de la Rague, with Théoule-sur-Mer in the background

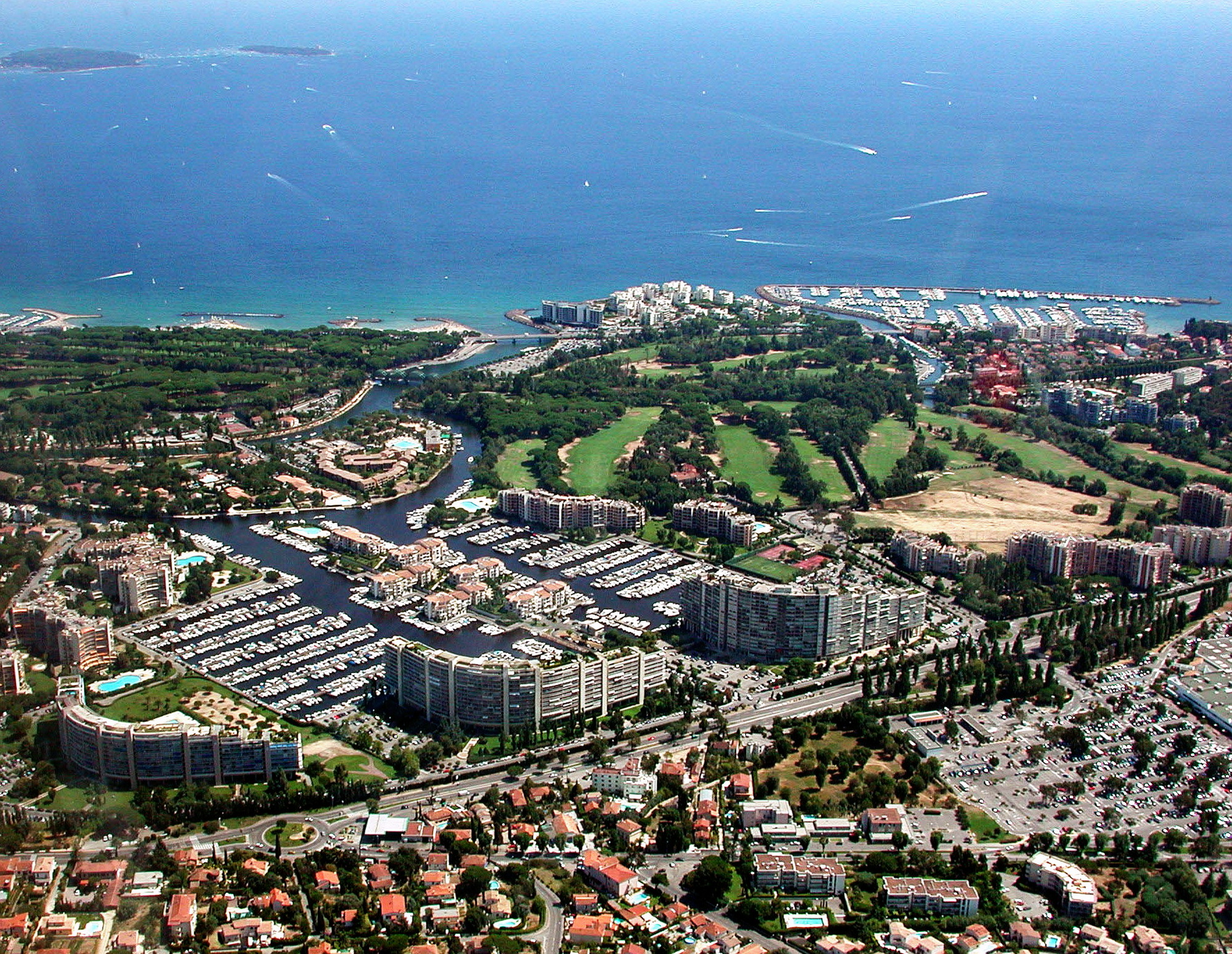
Aerial view of Mandelieu

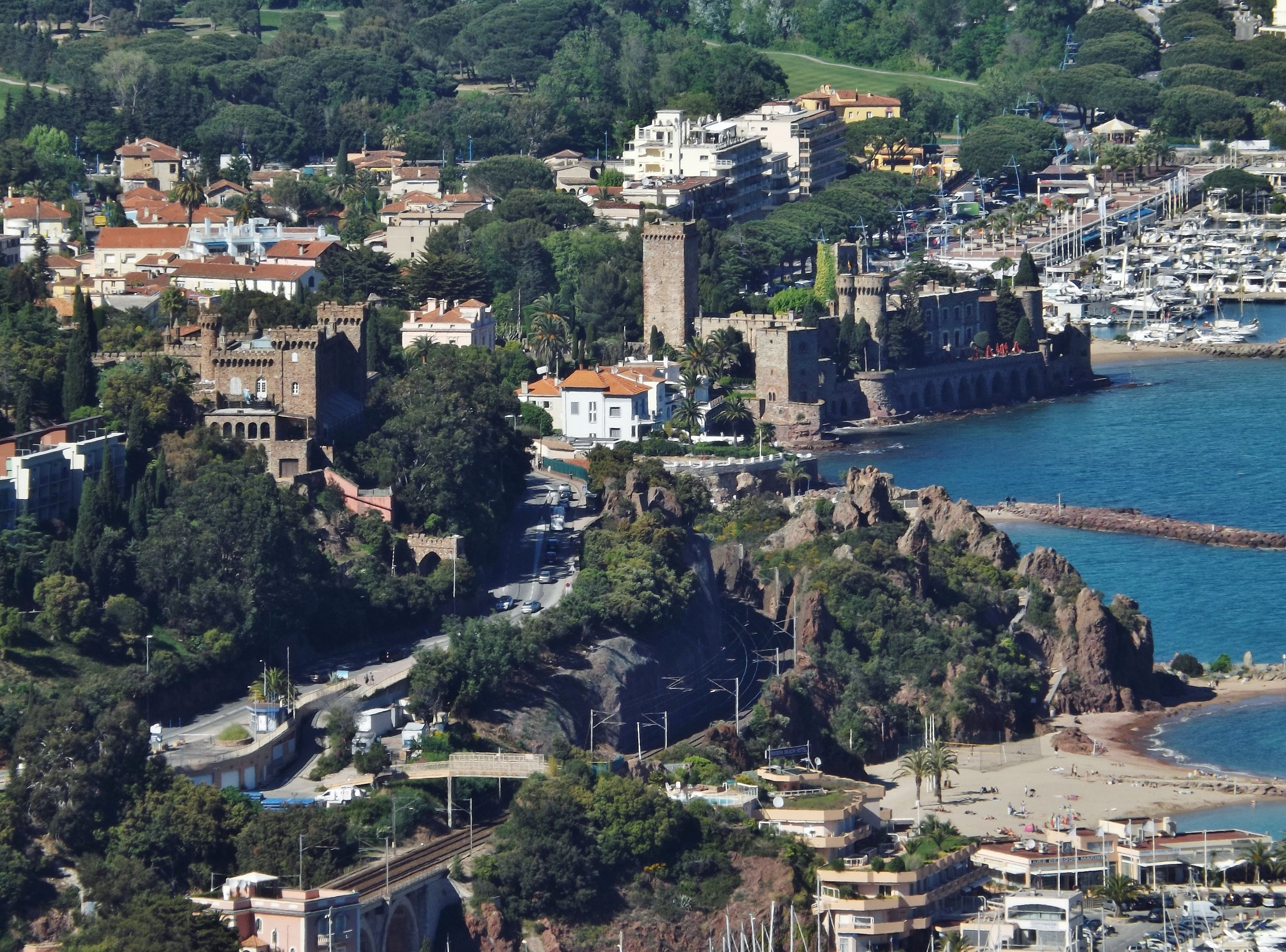
View of La Napoule
