= Golfe-Juan =

Coastal resort in Provence-Alpes-Côte d'Azur, France

Coordinates: 43°34′2.28″N 7°04′27″E

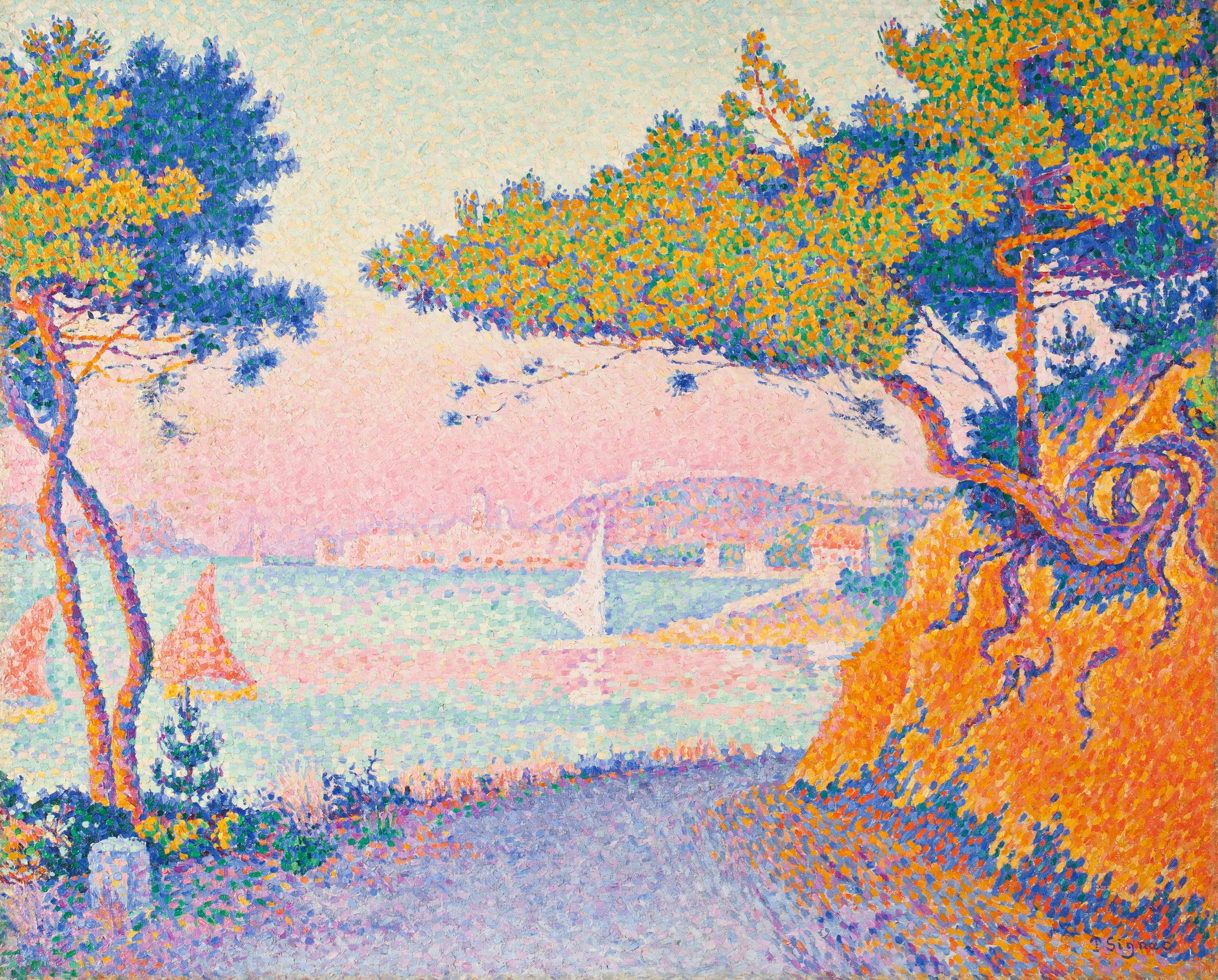
Golfe Juan by Paul Signac

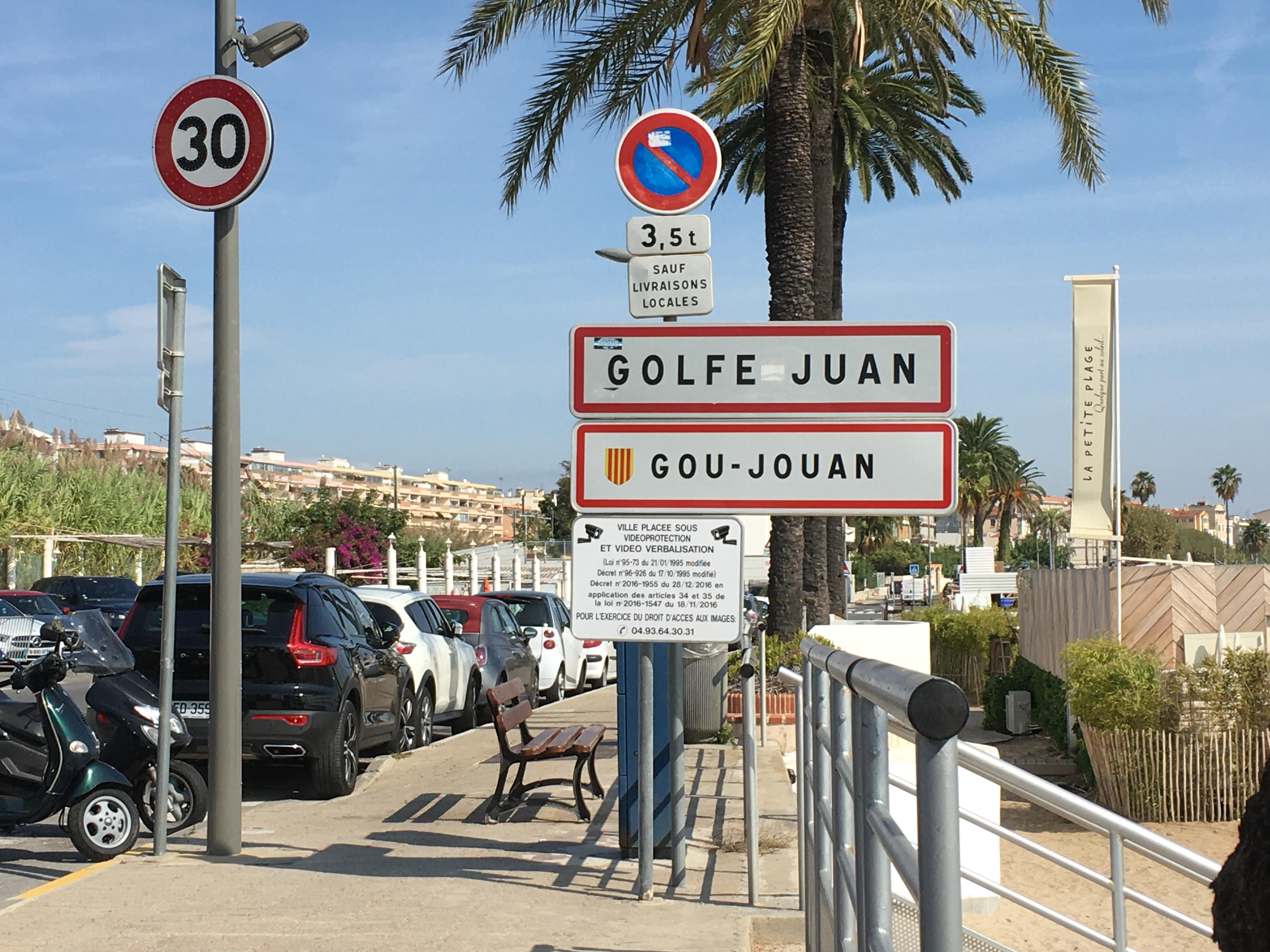
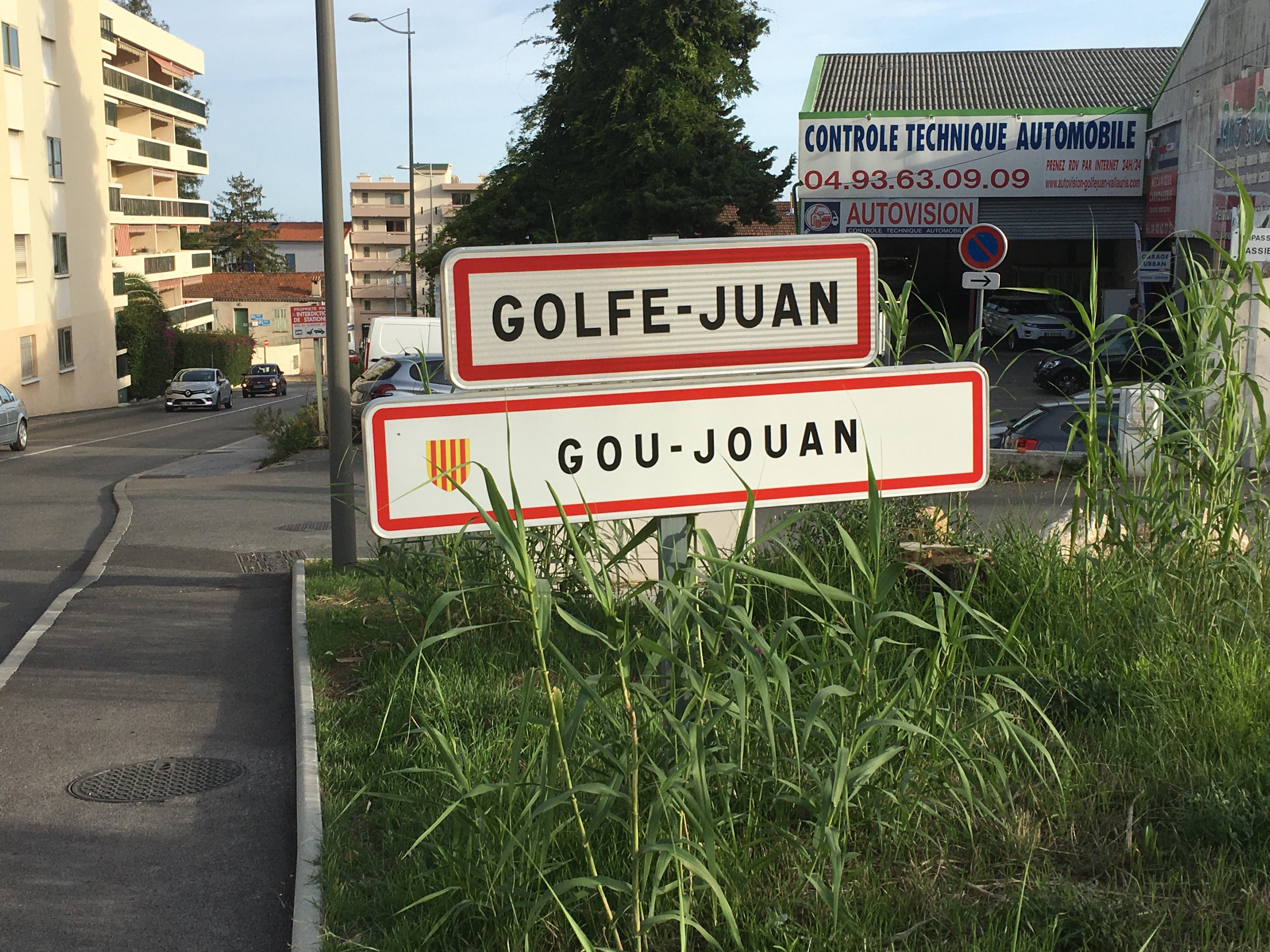
Two road signs of Golfe-Juan in both French and Nissart (Provençal dialect)

Golfe-Juan (French pronunciation: [ɡɔlf ʒɥɑ̃]; Occitan: Lo Gorg Joan, Lo Golfe Joan) is a seaside resort on France's Côte d'Azur. The distinct local character of Golfe-Juan is indicated by the existence of a demonym, "Golfe-Juanais", which is applied to its inhabitants.

== Overview ==
Golfe-Juan belongs to the commune of Vallauris in the Grasse arrondissement of the Alpes-Maritimes department, which belongs in turn to the Provence-Alpes-Côte d'Azur region of France. The area is served by the Golfe Juan-Vallauris railway station.

On 1 March 1815, Napoléon Bonaparte landed at Golfe-Juan with 607 Grenadiers of the Old Guard, 118 Polish Lancers, some 300 Corsicans, 50 Elite Gendarmes, 80 civilians, and 2 light artillery pieces, having escaped exile on the island of Elba. His return to Paris, commemorated by the Route Napoléon, and the campaign that led to his ultimate defeat at the Battle of Waterloo, are known as the "Hundred Days".

"Golfe Juan" is also the name of a pointillist painting done by Paul Signac (1863–1935), a French neo-impressionist, in 1896.
