= Théoule-sur-Mer =

Commune in Provence-Alpes-Côte d'Azur, France

Théoule-sur-Mer Teula de Mar (Occitan)
- Commune
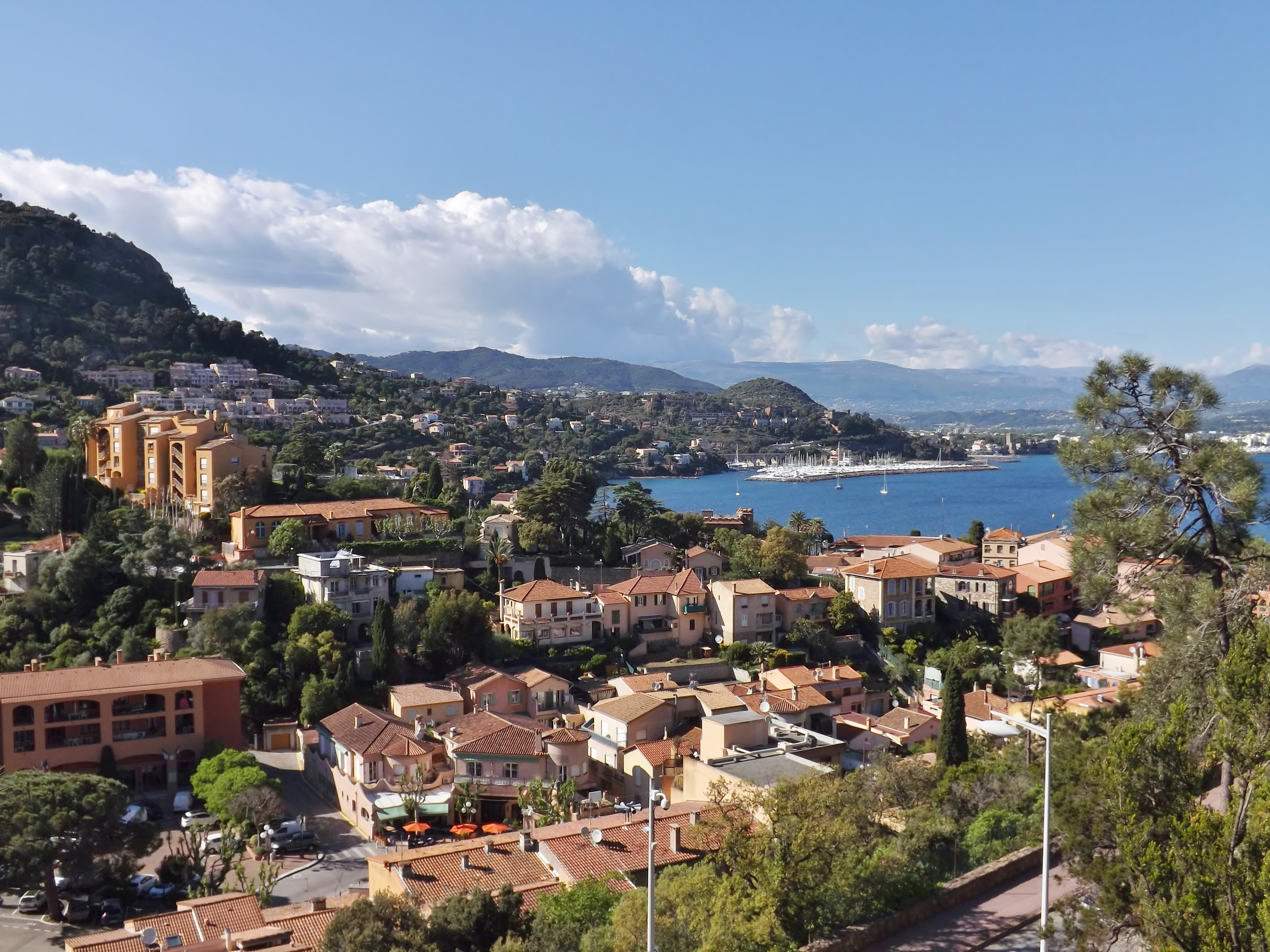
- A view of Théoule-sur-Mer

- Coat of arms
- Location of Théoule-sur-Mer
- Location within France Location within Provence-Alpes-Côte d'Azur
- Coordinates: 43°30′28″N 6°56′27″E
- Country: France
- Region: Provence-Alpes-Côte d'Azur
- Department: Alpes-Maritimes
- Arrondissement: Grasse
- Canton: Mandelieu-la-Napoule
- Intercommunality: CA Cannes Pays de Lérins

Government
  - Mayor (2026–32): Georges Botella (UDI)
- Area^{1}: 10.49 km^{2} (4.05 sq mi)
- Elevation: 10 m (33 ft)
- Highest elevation: 440 m (1,440 ft)
- Lowest elevation: 0 m (0 ft)
- Population (2023): 1,477
  - Density: 140.8/km^{2} (364.7/sq mi)
- Time zone: UTC+01:00 (CET)
  - Summer (DST): UTC+02:00 (CEST)
- INSEE/Postal code: 06138 /06590
- ^{1} French Land Register data, which excludes lakes, ponds, glaciers > 1 km^{2} (0.386 sq mi or 247 acres) and river estuaries.

Théoule-sur-Mer (French pronunciation: [teulsyʁmɛʁ]; Occitan: Teula de Mar or simply Teula), popularly known as Théoule, is a resort village in the Alpes-Maritimes department in the Provence-Alpes-Côte d'Azur region in Southeastern France. It lies to the east of the Esterel Massif, on the French Riviera. Théoule-sur-Mer is on the border with the Var department, 6 km (3.7 mi) south of Mandelieu-la-Napoule.

The village is home to Théoule-sur-Mer Castle.

== Demographics ==
Historical population
Year	Pop.	±% p.a.
1968	733	—
1975	798	+1.22%
1982	1,010	+3.42%
1990	1,216	+2.35%
1999	1,296	+0.71%
2007	1,527	+2.07%
2012	1,526	−0.01%
2017	1,413	−1.53%
2023	1,477	+0.74%
Source: INSEE

== See also ==
- Communes of the Alpes-Maritimes department
