= Boniface (disambiguation) =

Saint Boniface was an 8th century Christian saint and bishop.

Boniface may also refer to:

- Boniface (name), a list of people with either the given name or surname
- Boniface (cover name), the cover name of World War II Ultra decryptions
- SS Boniface (1928), a steam cargo liner
- Innkeeper in The Beaux' Stratagem, hence hypocorism for "mine host", an hotelier

== See also ==
- Pope Boniface (disambiguation)
- Saint Boniface (disambiguation)
- Bonifas (disambiguation)
