= Boniecki =

Boniecki [ˈbɔniɛt͡ski] (with its female form Boniecka [ˈbɔniɛt͡ska] and plural form Bonieccy [ˈbɔniɛt͡st͡sɨ]) is a Polish surname which is most frequent in the central voivodeships of Kuyavia-Pomerania and Masovia and can also be found among the Polish diaspora. It may have been derived from the Polish version Bonifacy of the given name Boniface.

Notable people with the name Boniecki/Boniecka include:

- Jerzy Boniecki (1933–2021), Polish former swimmer
- Maria Boniecka (1910–1978), Polish author and teacher
- Maria Albin Boniecki (1908–1995), Polish artist
