= 1957 in architecture =

The year 1957 in architecture involved some significant architectural events and new buildings.

== Events ==
- July 20 – Civic Trust (England), founded by Duncan Sandys to promote improvement of the built environment, holds its inaugural conference.
- Byrd Station commissioned in West Antarctica.
- Danish architect Jørn Utzon unexpectedly wins the competition to design the Sydney Opera House in Australia. By the time it is opened in 1973 he will have resigned from the project and never sees the completed building.

== Buildings and structures ==
=== Buildings opened ===
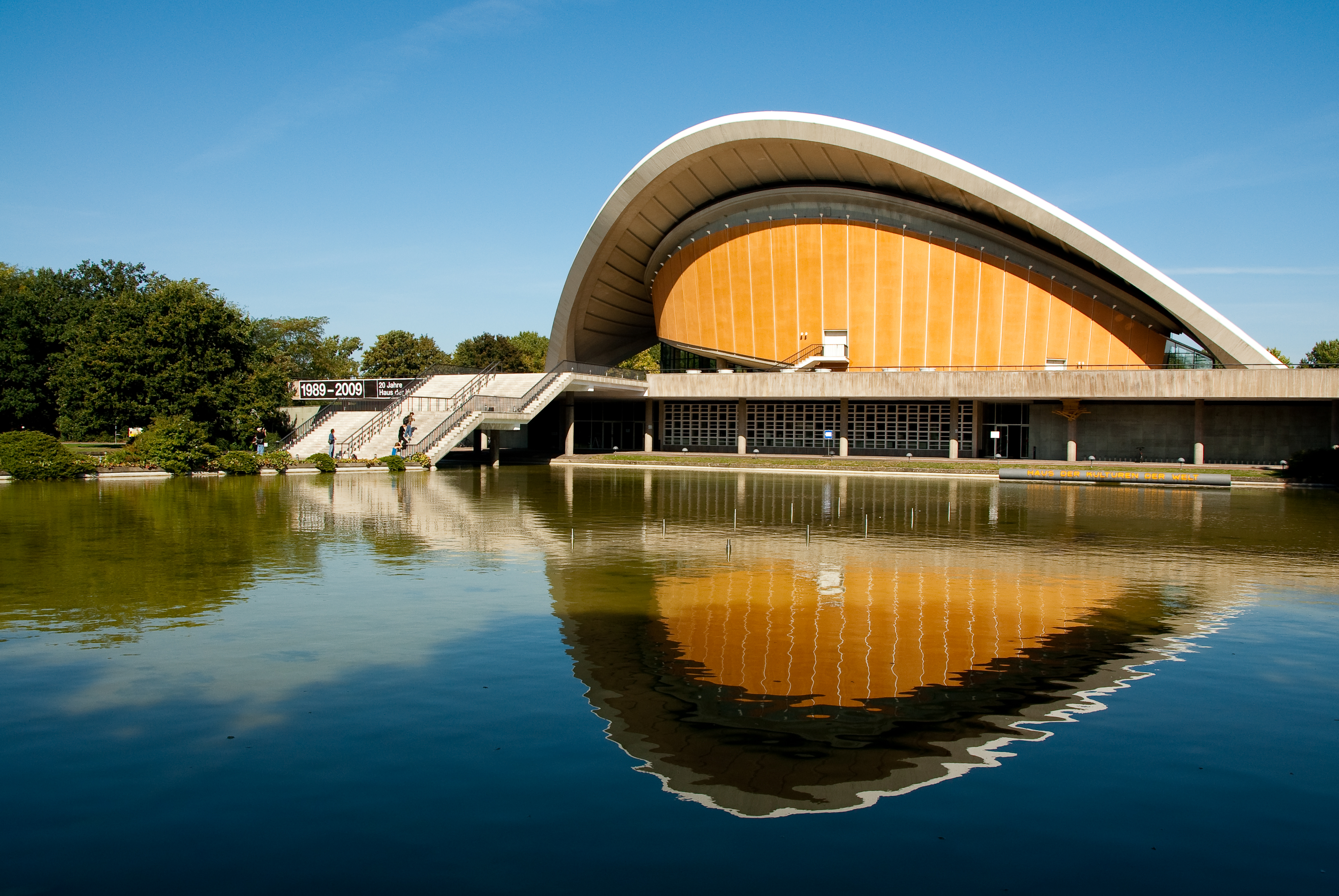
The Congress Hall in Berlin, Germany

- July 22 – Fazle Omar Mosque, Hamburg, Germany.
- September 19 – The Congress Hall Berlin, Germany is opened.
- September 24 – Camp Nou, home stadium of FC Barcelona, officially opens in Barcelona, Spain.
- October 15
  - Torre de Madrid, one of the tallest buildings in Spain, designed by Julián and José María Otamendi Machimbarrena.
  - Wuhan Yangtze River Bridge in China, with Wang Juqian as chief engineer.
- Otaniemi Chapel, Aalto University, Espoo, Finland, designed by Heikki and Kaija Siren.
- Church of St. Bonifatius, Kassel, Germany, designed by Architekturbüro Josef Bieling, consecrated.
- St Luke's Church, Pinner, England, designed by F. X. Velarde.
- First stage of Golden Lane Estate in Finsbury, designed by Chamberlin, Powell and Bon, officially opened. Great Arthur House is (briefly) the tallest residential building in Britain at the time of construction.

=== Buildings completed ===
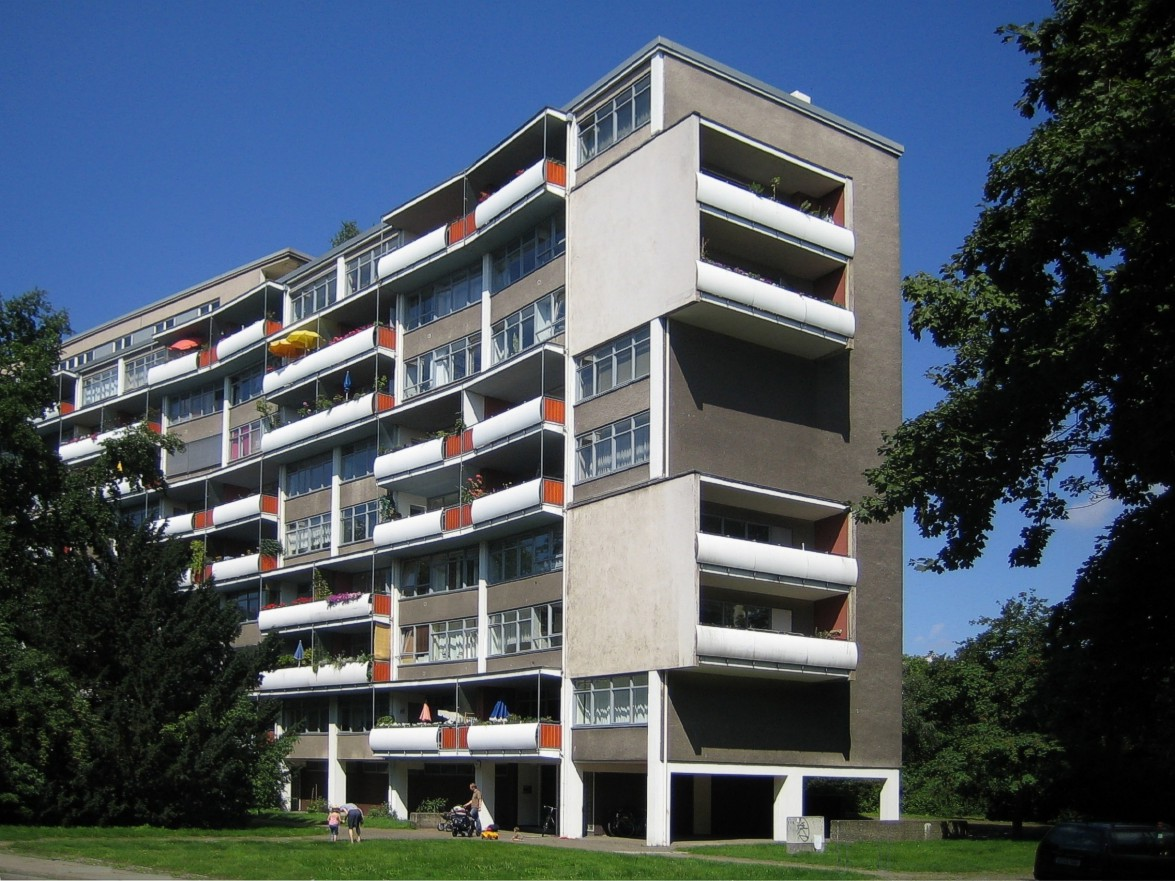
Zeilenbau housing at Interbau, by Walter Gropius

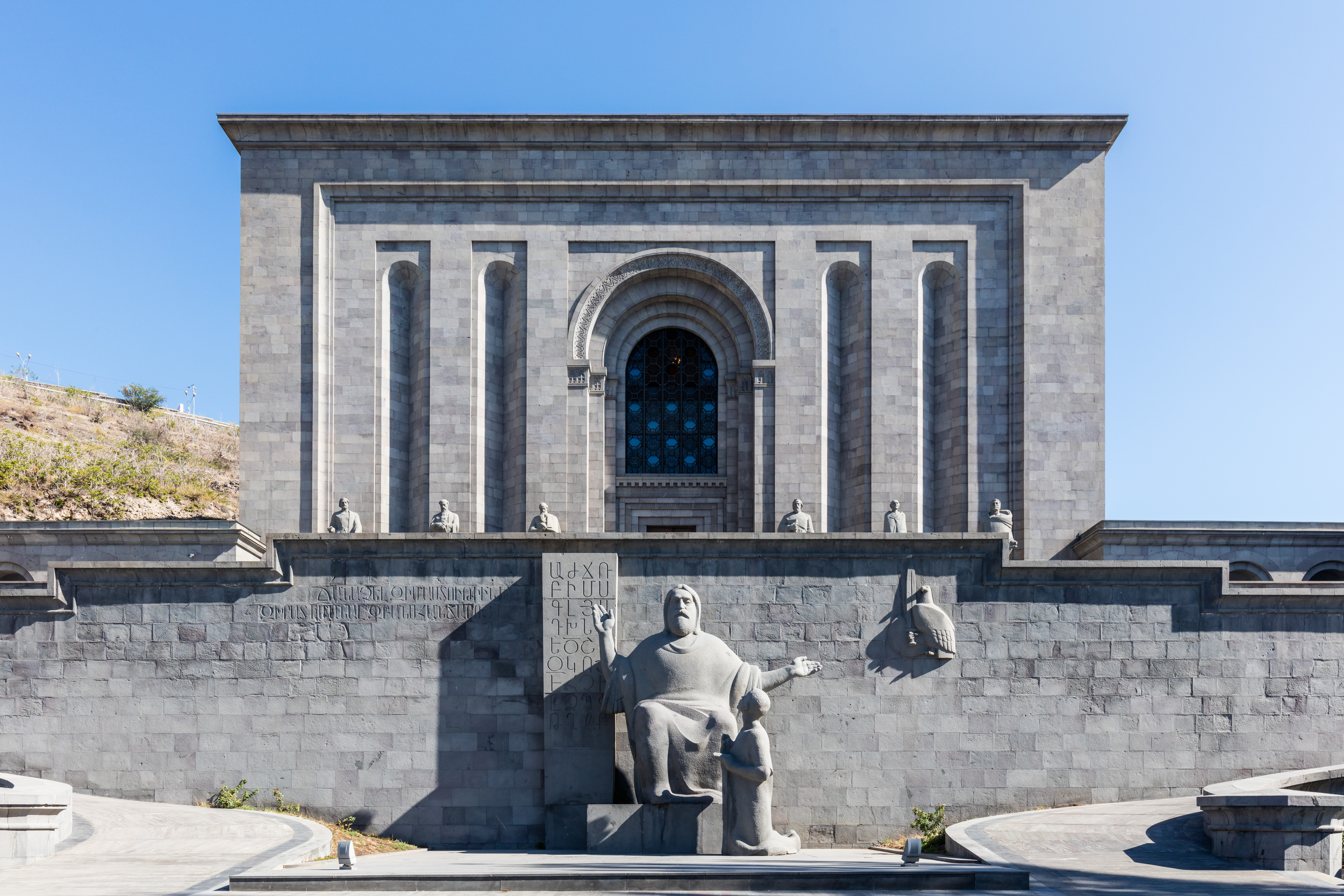
Mashtots Institute of Ancient Manuscripts in Yerevan, Armenia

- Connecticut General Life Insurance Company Headquarters building designed by Gordon Bunshaft of Skidmore, Owings, and Merrill in Bloomfield, Connecticut, USA.
- Friedrich-Engelhorn-Hochhaus in Ludwigshafen am Rhein, at this time the tallest building in Germany.
- The Interbau project in Hansaviertel, West Berlin, with buildings designed by forty-eight architects.
- Mashtots Institute of Ancient Manuscripts in Yerevan, Armenia, designed by Mark Grigorian in 1945.
- Munkegaard School near Copenhagen, Denmark, designed by Arne Jacobsen.
- Spaarbank, Rotterdam, designed by J. J. P. Oud in 1942.
- St James's House, Birmingham, England, by John Madin.
- Richards Medical Research Laboratories by architect Louis Kahn, on the campus of the University of Pennsylvania, USA.
- Unité d'Habitation at Marseille, by Le Corbusier.
- Josep Lluís Sert's house for himself at 64 Francis Avenue, Cambridge, Massachusetts, USA.
- Dr. Robert Hohf House near Kenilworth, Illinois, USA, designed by Keck & Keck.
- High Sunderland (house for Bernat Klein), Scottish Borders, designed by Peter Womersley.
- The Pediment, Aynho, Northamptonshire, England, designed by Raymond Erith.
- Church of Our Lady and St Columba, Wallsend, England, designed by Vincente G. Stienlet of Pascal J. Stienlet & Sons.
- Norms Restaurant, La Cienega Boulevard, Los Angeles, USA by Armét & Davis.

== Awards ==
- AIA Gold Medal – Ralph Walker, Louis Skidmore
- RIBA Royal Gold Medal – Alvar Aalto

== Births ==
- May 18 – Ai Weiwei, Chinese contemporary artist, active in sculpture, installation, architecture, curating, photography, film, and social, political and cultural criticism
- August 5 – Shigeru Ban, Japanese architect known for use of paper and cardboard
- August 8 – Gion A. Caminada, Swiss architect
- September 18 – Tom Wright, English architect known for Burj Al Arab

== Deaths ==
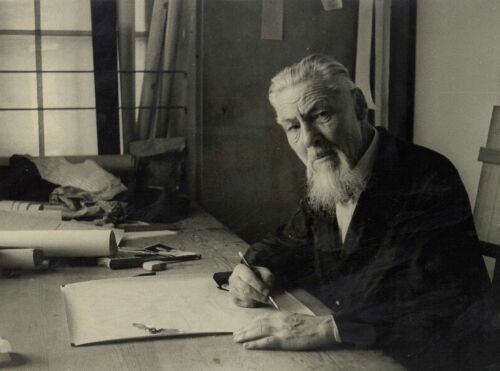
Joze Plecnik

- January 7 – Joze Plecnik, Slovene architect (born 1872)
- February 2 – Julia Morgan, first woman to be admitted to the architecture program at l'École nationale supérieure des Beaux-Arts in Paris, and the first woman architect licensed in California (born 1872)
- August 22 – Beverly Loraine Greene, first African American woman architect to be licensed (born 1915)
- October 3 – Bernard Maybeck, American architect of the Arts and Crafts Movement (born 1862)
- October 15 – Henry Van de Velde, Belgian Flemish painter, architect and interior designer (born 1863)
