= 1964 in architecture =

The year 1964 in architecture involved some significant architectural events and new buildings.

== Events ==
- June 11 – Reconstruction of the Wren church of St Mary-le-Bow in the City of London by Laurence King is completed.
- Architecture Without Architects by Bernard Rudofsky is published.
- Dawson's Heights, social housing apartment blocks in Dulwich, south London, is designed by Kate Macintosh.
- Didcot Power Station layout in England is designed by Frederick Gibberd.

== Buildings and structures ==
=== Buildings opened ===
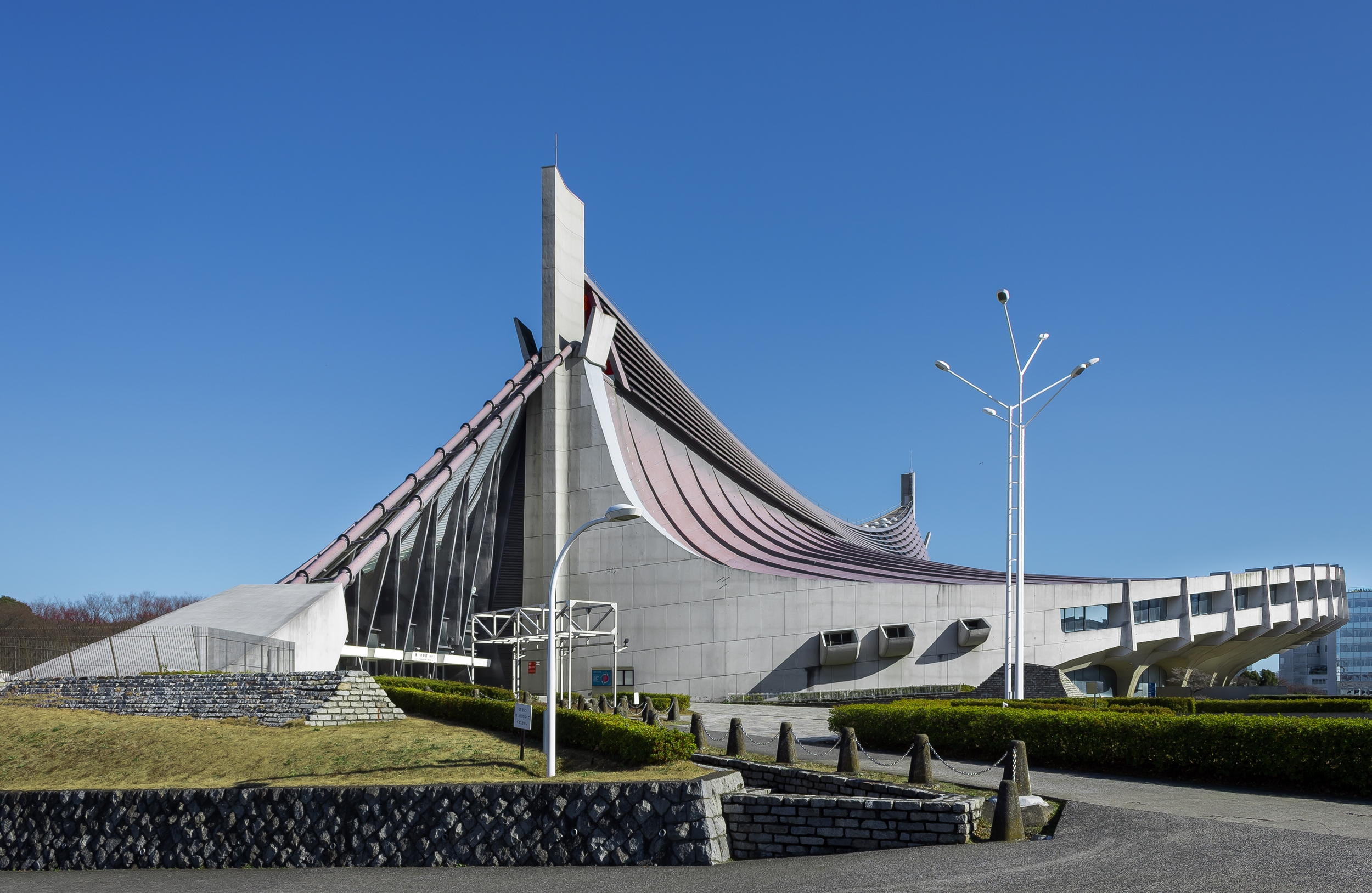
Yoyogi National Gymnasium in Tokyo, Japan

- April – Donauturm (Danube Tower) in Vienna, Austria, designed by Hannes Lintl, opened.
- May 30 – Zu den heiligen Engeln church in Hanover, Germany, designed by Bieling Architekten, consecrated.
- July 23 – Church of the Good Shepherd, Nottingham, England (Roman Catholic), designed by Gerard Goalen, opened.
- October – Yoyogi National Gymnasium in Tokyo, Japan, designed by Kenzō Tange for the 1964 Summer Olympics, opened.
- October 16 – St Catherine's College, Oxford, England, designed by Arne Jacobsen, opened.
- October 17 – Lake Burley Griffin in Canberra, Australia, designed by Walter Burley Griffin (died 1937), opened.
- November 21
  - Verrazzano–Narrows Bridge across New York Harbor, the longest suspension bridge in the world by the length of central span (1964-1981), designed by Othmar Ammann, opened.
  - Gala Fairydean F.C. stand, Netherdale stadium, Galashiels, Scotland, designed by Peter Womersley, opened.
- December 28 – Kyoto Tower in Kyoto, Japan, designed by Makoto Tanahashi, opened.

=== Buildings completed ===
- July 15 – The Post Office Tower in London (now known as the BT Tower), designed by Eric Bedford and G. R. Yeats, is topped out.

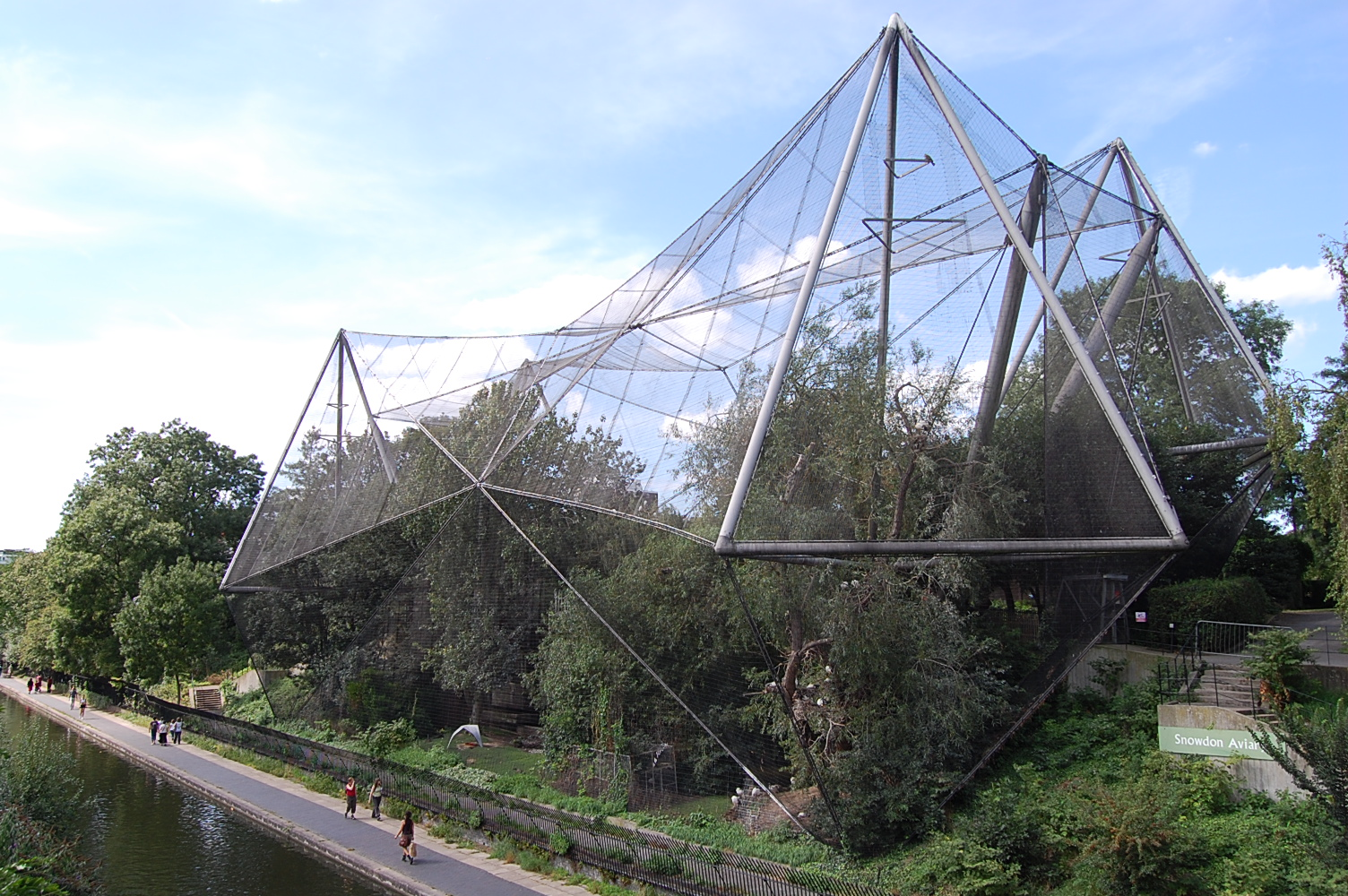
Snowdon Aviary, London Zoo

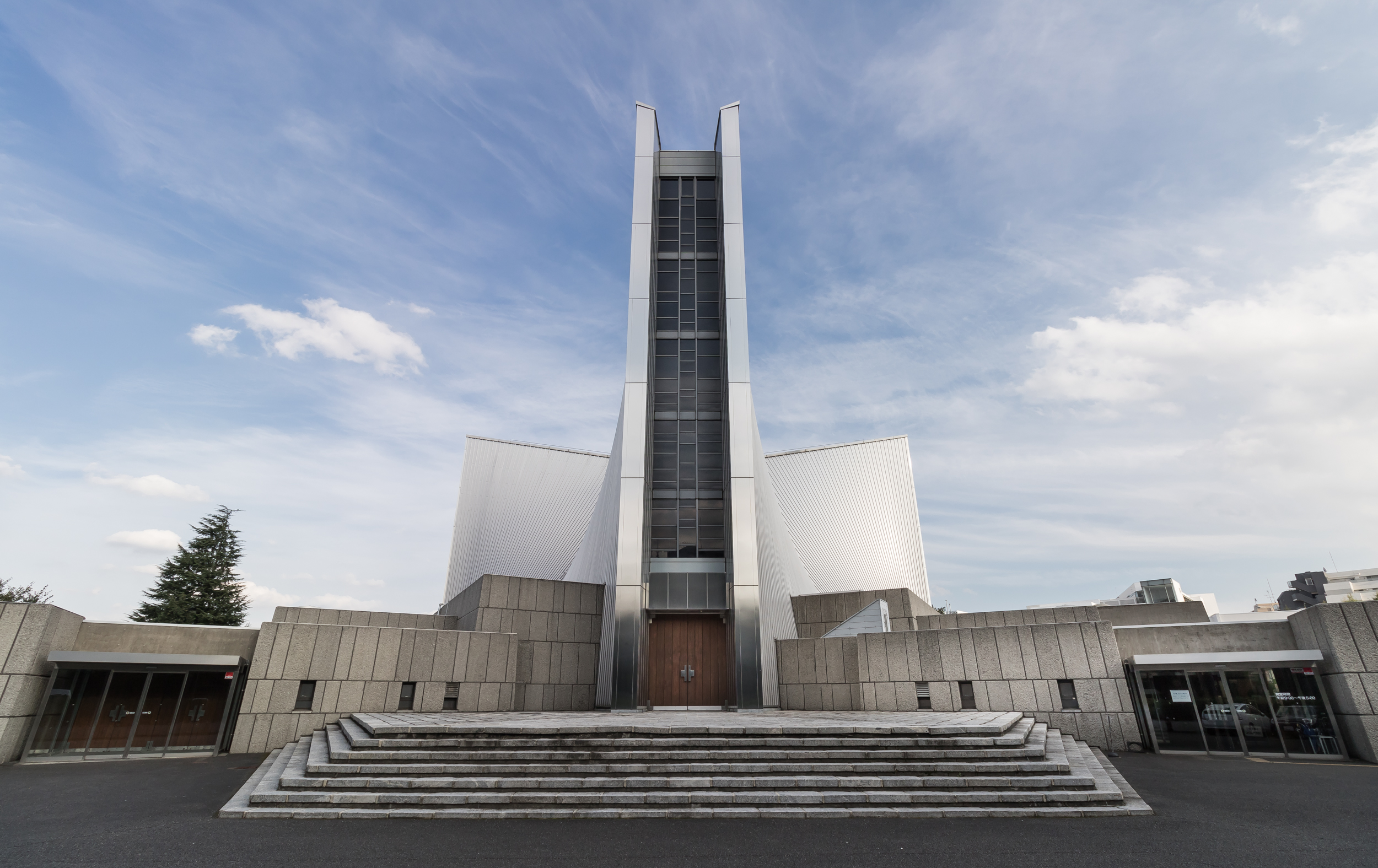
St. Mary's Cathedral, Tokyo, Japan

The Fondation Maeght in Saint-Paul-de-Vence, France

- December 28 – Kyoto Tower in Kyoto, Japan opens.
- date unknown
  - Tour de la Bourse in Montreal, Quebec, Canada, is completed and becomes the tallest building in the British Commonwealth (1964–1967).
  - CBS Building in New York City, the only skyscraper designed by Eero Saarinen (d. 1961).
  - Prudential Tower in Boston, United States, designed by Charles Luckman and Associates.
  - The Erieview Tower in Downtown Cleveland, Ohio, United States, is completed as part of the Erieview urban renewal plan.
  - The Los Angeles County Museum of Art new building, designed by William Pereira.
  - Founders Tower (Oklahoma City).
  - Casino Tower in Niagara Falls.
  - Rohm and Haas Corporate Headquarters in Philadelphia, United States, designed by Pietro Belluschi and George M. Ewing Co.
  - Fernmeldeturm Berlin in Berlin, Germany, is completed after 3 years.
  - The Fernmeldeturm Ulm-Ermingen in Ulm-Ermingen, Baden-Württemberg, Germany.
  - Pääskyvuoren linkkitorni in Turku, Finland.
  - The Ušće Tower in Belgrade, Serbia (badly damaged in 1999 by NATO airstrikes, but reconstructed in 2004).
  - The Royal College of Physicians in London, designed by Denys Lasdun.
  - Swiss Cottage Central Library for the London Borough of Camden, designed by Sir Basil Spence.
  - The Economist Group headquarters in the City of London, designed by Peter and Alison Smithson.
  - The Snowdon Aviary, London Zoo, designed by Lord Snowdon, Cedric Price and Frank Newby, is completed.
  - St. Mary's Cathedral, Tokyo, Japan (Roman Catholic), designed by Kenzō Tange, is completed.
  - St Mary's Church, Leyland, Lancashire, England (Roman Catholic), designed by J. Faczynski of Weightman and Bullen.
  - Synagogue for Belfast Hebrew Congregation (Northern Ireland) designed by Eugene Rosenberg of Yorke Rosenberg Mardall.
  - Extension to the Ulster Museum, Belfast, designed in Brutalist style by Francis Pym, completed.
  - The Smithsonian Institution's Museum of History and Technology in Washington, D.C., designed by McKim, Mead & White, opens to the public (January 23).
  - Fondation Maeght museum of modern art at Saint-Paul-de-Vence in the Alpes-Maritimes of France, designed by Spanish Catalan architect Josep Lluís Sert, is opened (July 28).
  - New House, Shipton-under-Wychwood, England, designed by Roy Stout and Patrick Litchfield.

== Awards ==
- AIA Gold Medal – Pier Luigi Nervi
- Architecture Firm Award – The Architects Collaborative
- RAIA Gold Medal – Cobden Parkes
- RIBA Royal Gold Medal – Maxwell Fry
- Prix de Rome, architecture – Bernard Schoebel
- Rome Prize Fellowship at American Academy in Rome – Charles O. Perry

== Births ==
- September 15 – Alan Jones, Northern Ireland-born architect
- date unknown
  - Heike Hanada, German artist, architect and teacher of architecture
  - Greg Lynn, American architect and academic

== Deaths ==
- February 3 – Albert Richardson, English architect, writer, and Professor of Architecture (born 1880)
- March 28 – Vlastislav Hofman, Czech artist and architect (born 1884)
- June 26 – Gerrit Rietveld, Dutch furniture designer and architect (born 1888)
- July 17 – Maurice Glaize, French architect and archeologist (born 1886)
- July 23 – Arkady Mordvinov, Soviet Stalinist architect (born 1896)
- November 5 – Percy Erskine Nobbs, Montreal Arts & Crafts architect (born 1875)
