= Boniface (name) =

Boniface is a given name and a surname of Latin origin, meaning "fortunate, auspicious". The best known of those who bear the name is Saint Boniface (c. 675?–754), an important leader in early Christianity and the "Apostle of the Germans". Others named Boniface include:

== Given name ==
=== Religious figures ===
- Boniface of Tarsus, saint who was martyred in 307, according to legend
- Boniface, 5th century African martyr
- Pope Boniface I (died 422)
- Pope Boniface II (died 532)
- Pope Boniface III (died 607)
- Pope Boniface IV (c. 550 – 615)
- Pope Boniface V (died 625)
- Saint Curetán (fl. 690–710), Bishop of Rosemarkie, also known as Boniface
- Pope Boniface VI (died 896)
- Antipope Boniface VII (died 985)
- Bruno of Querfurt (c. 974 – 1009), also known as Boniface, sainted missionary bishop and martyr, the "Apostle to the Prussians"
- Boniface of Valperga (died 1243), venerated Bishop of Aosta
- Boniface of Brussels (1183–1260), Bishop of Lausanne
- Boniface of Savoy (bishop) (c. 1217 – 1270)
- Pope Boniface VIII (c. 1230 – 1303), responsible for issuing the papal bull Unam sanctam
- Pope Boniface IX (c. 1350 – 1404)
- Boniface Adoyo, Kenyan bishop and opponent of the theory of evolution
- Boniface Hardin (1933–2012), American Benedictine monk
- Boniface Lele (1947–2014), Kenyan Roman Catholic bishop and archbishop
- Boniface Wimmer (1809–1887), German monk who founded the first Benedictine monastery in the United States

=== Rulers and soldiers ===
- Bonifacius, a 5th-century Roman general also known as Count Boniface
- Boniface, Duke of Alsace (fl. mid 7th century)
- Boniface, Count of Bologna and Margrave of Tuscany (died probably 1101)
- Boniface de Castellane, Marquis de Castellane, (1788–1862), Marshal of France
- Boniface I of Challant (died 1426)
- Boniface I of Montferrat (c. 1150 – 1207), Italian chosen as leader of the Fourth Crusade
- Boniface II of Montferrat (1202–1253)
- Bonifaci VI de Castellana, a Provençal knight known as Boniface de Castellane (fl. 1244–1265)
- Boniface III, Marquess of Montferrat (1426–1494)
- Boniface IV, Marquess of Montferrat, (1512–1530)
- Boniface del Vasto (c. 1060 – c. 1130), Margrave of Savona and Western Liguria
- Boniface, Count of Savoy (1245–1263)
- Boniface I, Margrave of Tuscany (died 823)
- Boniface II, Margrave of Tuscany (died c. 838)
- Boniface III, Margrave of Tuscany (c. 985 – 1052)
- Boniface of Verona (died 1317 or 1318), Lombard Crusader lord in Frankish Greece
- Boniface Sifu, chief of the Mayeyi people of Namibia
- Boniface Bebi, former chief of the Mafwe people of Namibia
- Bonifacio Pinedo (1888–1954), king of the Afro-Bolivian monarchy

=== Politicians ===
- Boniface Alexandre (born 1936), Haitian politician, acting President of Haiti (2004–2006)
- Boniface Berthin Zakahely, Malagasy politician
- Boniface S. Emerengwa (born 1959), Nigerian lawyer and politician
- Boniface Florescu (1848–1899), Romanian polygraph and politician
- Boniface Kabaka (1966–2020), Kenyan politician

=== Athletes ===
- Boniface Ambani (born 1982), Kenyan retired footballer
- Boniface Toroitich Kiprop (born 1985), Ugandan long-distance runner
- Boniface Merande (born 1962), Kenyan retired middle-distance runner
- Boniface N'Dong (born 1977), Senegalese retired professional basketball player
- Boniface Simutowe (1949–2014), Zambian soccer player
- Boniface Songok (born 1980), Kenyan middle-distance runner
- Boniface Usisivu (born 1974), Kenyan marathon runner

=== Other ===
- Boniface Mwangi (born 1983), Kenyan activist

== Surname ==
- André Boniface (1934–2024), French rugby union player
- Andrés Bonifacio (1863–1897), Filipino leader of the revolution against Spanish occupation
- Bruce Boniface (born 1981), singer, songwriter and producer whose stage name is Boniface
- Charles Etienne Boniface (1787–1853), French music teacher, playwright, journalist and polyglot
- Frédéric Boniface (born 1971), French former footballer
- George C. Boniface (1832–1912), American actor
- Guy Boniface (1937–1968), French rugby union footballer
- Gwen Boniface (born 1955), Canadian police officer, lawyer and first female Commissioner of the Ontario Provincial Police (1998–2006)
- Symona Boniface (1894–1950), American film actress, particularly in Three Stooges shorts
- Victor Boniface, (born 2000), Nigerian footballer
- William Boniface (born 1963), American children's book author

== See also ==
- Bonifaci Ferrer (1350–1417), Carthusian monk
- Bonifacio (disambiguation)
- Bonifacius (given name), a short list of people named Bonifacius or Bonifatius
- Bonifas (disambiguation), which includes a list of people with the surname
- Bonifaz
