= Kirchrode-Bemerode-Wülferode =

- Borough of Hanover
- Location of Kirchrode-Bemerode-Wülferode in Hanover
- Interactive map of Kirchrode-Bemerode-Wülferode
- Location within Germany Location within Lower Saxony
- Coordinates: 52°20′48″N 9°50′0″E
- Country: Germany
- State: Lower Saxony
- City: Hanover
- Subdivisions: 3

Area
  - Total: 23.80 km^{2} (9.19 sq mi)

Population (2020-12-31)
  - Total: 32,625
  - Density: 1,371/km^{2} (3,550/sq mi)
- Time zone: UTC+01:00 (CET)
  - Summer (DST): UTC+02:00 (CEST)
- Dialling codes: 0511

Kirchrode-Bemerode-Wülferode (German pronunciation: [kɪʁçˈʁoːdə beːməˈʁoːdə vʏlfəˈʁoːdə]; Eastphalian: Kerkreoe-Beimeroe-Wülferoe) is the sixth borough of Hanover. As of 2020, it has 32,625 inhabitants and consists of the quarters Kirchrode (12,222 inhabitants), Bemerode (19,453 inhabitants) and Wülferode (950 inhabitants).

Since 2011, the SPD politician Bernd Rödel is mayor of the borough.

== Population development ==

The graph shows the population development in the district of Kirchrode-Bemerode-Wülferode since 1 January 2005.

== Kirchrode ==
The formerly independent village Kirchrode was incorporated in 1907 to Hanover. Today, the district is located in the countryside and, with large plots, villas and upmarket residential character of the upper-middle-class neighborhood. Recreation areas such as the Hermann-Löns-Park and Eilenriede can be reached quickly. In the Tiergarten (park) walkers can observe deer, red deer, roe deer, wild pigs and other small game. The park was created out of a ducal hunting ground. Until the 18th century hunting took place in the royal park.

The first church, St. Jakobi, was erected the "Kleiner Hillen" in 1150, dedicated to St. James. Its tower in its present form dates from the 14th century. The church became Lutheran during the Reformation. The nave was rebuilt from 1782 to 1794. A Catholic church Zu den heiligen Engeln was completed in 1964.

== Bemerode ==
Mentioned first in 1204, the village Bemerode was incorporated to Hanover in 1974. In its center lie the family estate of the Von Graevemeyer family and the estate of the Mörlins family. Since 1999 Bemerode is connected to Hanover by the tram network and has good shopping. The undeveloped part of the adjacent forest areas are used for recreation. Local clubs like the Volunteer Fire Department, the Shooting Club and TSV Bemerode maintain community life.

== Wülferode ==
Wülferode was incorporated to Hanover in 1974. The village has a bus stop, but does not have a local shop. Cultural institutions exist in form of a youth center, a playground, the sports club TSV Wülferode, the volunteer fire department and the local citizen's community. In a guest house, guests will find the shortest counter of Hanover. Moreover, there are recreation areas such as the surrounding forests (Bockmerholz, Gaim). One attraction is the landmarked chapel, built in 1756 as a timber-framed building. Its bell dates from 1644.
