= Bonifacio =

Bonifacio may refer to:

== Places ==
- Bonifacio, Corse-du-Sud, a town in Corsica, France
- Strait of Bonifacio, separating Corsica from Sardinia
- Bonifacio, Misamis Occidental, a municipality in the Philippines
- Bonifacio Global City, a central business district in Metro Manila, Philippines
- Fort Bonifacio, an army camp in Metro Manila, Philippines
- Liwasang Bonifacio, a public square in Manila, Philippines
- Andres Bonifacio Avenue, a major road in Quezon City, Philippines
- Bonifacio Drive, a major road in Manila, Philippines

== Other uses ==
- Bonifacio (name), including a list of people with the name
- Bonifacio Transport Corporation, an intercity bus company in the Philippines
- Bonifacio: Ang Unang Pangulo, a 2014 Philippine historical drama film

== See also ==
- San Bonifacio, Verona, Italy, a commune
- São Bonifácio, Santa Catarina, Brazil, a municipality
- Boniface (name)
- Saint Boniface (disambiguation)
