= Zu den heiligen Engeln =

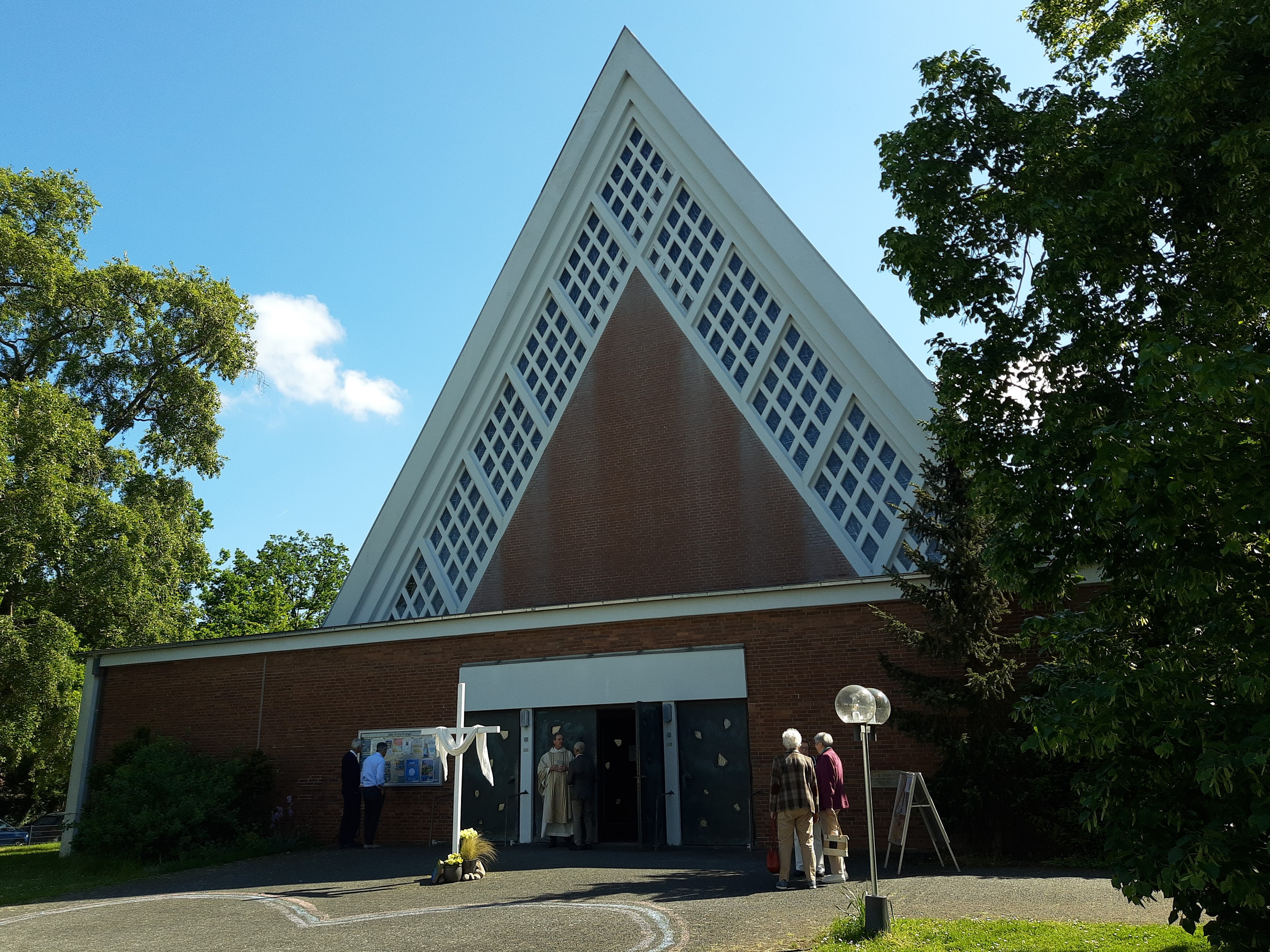
- Front of the church in 2023

- 52°21′15″N 09°49′20″E
- Location: Hanover-Kirchrode, Germany
- Denomination: Catholic
- Website: www.heilige-engel.de

History
- Dedication: The angels
- Consecrated: 30 May 1964

Architecture
- Architect: Josef Bieling

Administration
- Diocese: Hildesheim

Zu den heiligen Engeln (To the Holy Angels) is a Catholic parish and church in Hanover-Kirchrode, Lower Saxony, Germany. The church was built in 1964 on a design by Josef Bieling, and was remodeled in 2014. It is now the parish church of a larger parish, serving the district Kirchrode-Bemerode-Wülferode. It belongs to the deanery of Hanover and the Diocese of Hildesheim. The church is dedicated to the angels.

In 1977, the church served for a pilot project by the ZDF for nation-wide regular live broadcasts of services on television. The parish collaborates in ecumenical partnership with Protestant parishes in the neighbourhood. It was certified for ecological awareness and management.

== History ==
The parish Zu den heiligen Engeln was split off the parish St. Antonius in Kleefeld on 1 July 1964. At that time it had 1,850 members, increasing to 3,400 by 1990. The church was completed in 1964, including a parish hall (Pfarrheim) in 1998.

=== Church ===
The church was designed by Josef Bieling, a prolific designer of churches, in the shape of a tent, as a symbol of the tent of God with men (Zelt Gottes unter den Menschen) with a steep roof almost to the ground. The groundbreaking was in 1962, the ceremonious laying of the cornerstone in 1963. The church was built in 1963 and 1964, and was consecrated on 30 May 1964 by Bishop Heinrich Maria Janssen. The church was among the last, before the liturgical reform (Liturgiereform) after the Second Vatican Council, to have a canopy (Baldachin) above the altar. The interior featured a statue of Mary, the Stations of the Cross, and the windows, which show the Burning bush behind the altar, and an organ built by Emil Hammer Orgelbau in 1987.

For the celebration of the 50th anniversary, the church was restored, including a new lighting system. The former baptism chapel was converted to a room of silence (Raum der Stille), accessible from the entrance hall even when the church is closed. The area around the altar was remodeled by Klaus Determann, but the unique Baldachin was retained, making the church the only one in the diocese with this feature. The total cost was around €400,000. Bishop Norbert Trelle held the reopening on 12 April 2014.

=== Parish ===
From 1969, Norbert Joachim was the parish priest, serving until 2007. He focused on ministry for families and youth, inclusion of voluntary lay people in the parish activities, and on ecumenical exchange. He was instrumental in using digital media. From 1977, the parish was the testing place for a series of live broadcasts of services by the ZDF, which resulted in regular weekly broadcasts from different locations from 1979. The parish collaborates with the Protestant parishes around, St. Jakobi in Kirchrode, St. Johannis in Bemerode, and St. Martin in Anderten in ecumenical partnership. In 2016, it was the second parish in the diocese to be certified for ecological awareness and management according to the European standard EMAS.

== Gallery ==
Interior from the entrance

Glass windows

Altar area

Chapel to Mary, in May
