= St. Boniface Church =

St. Boniface Church, or variants thereof, may refer to:

== Australia ==
- St Boniface Cathedral, Bunbury, Western Australia

== Belgium ==
- St. Boniface Church, Antwerp

== Canada ==
- Saint Boniface Cathedral, St. Boniface, Winnipeg, Manitoba

== Germany ==
- St. Bonifatius, Bergen
- St. Bonifatius, Heidelberg
- St. Bonifatius, Kassel
- St. Bonifatius, Lorchhausen
- St. Bonifatius, Paderborn
- St. Bonifatius, Wiesbaden
- St. Bonifatius, Wirges

== Netherlands ==
- Saint Boniface church, Leeuwarden

== South Africa ==
- St Boniface Church, Germiston

== United Kingdom ==
- St Boniface Church, Bonchurch
- Old St Boniface Church, Bonchurch
- St Boniface's Church, Bunbury

== United States ==
- St. Boniface Catholic Church (Fulda, Indiana)
- St. Boniface Church (Clinton, Iowa)
- Saint Boniface Church (New Vienna, Iowa)
- St. Boniface Catholic Church (Sioux City, Iowa)
- St. Boniface Catholic Church (Waukee, Iowa)
- St. Boniface Catholic Church (Westphalia, Iowa)
- St. Boniface Roman Catholic Church, Detroit, Michigan
- Church of St. Boniface (Melrose, Minnesota), now the Church of St. Mary
- St. Boniface Roman Catholic Church (Perryville, Missouri), a former church
- St. Boniface Roman Catholic Church (Elmont, New York)
- St. Boniface Church (New York City)
- St. Boniface Church (Sublimity, Oregon)
- St. Boniface Roman Catholic Church (Pittsburgh, Pennsylvania)
- St. Boniface Church, Convent and Rectory, Uniontown, Washington
