= Bonifatius (given name) =

Bonifacius or Bonifatius is the given name of:

- Bonifatius (died 432), ancient Roman general and governor of the Diocese of Africa
- Bonifacius of S. Marco (died 1130 or later), Roman Catholic cardinal priest
- Bonifaciu Florescu (1848–1899), Romanian author and politician born Bonifacius Florescu
- Bonifatius Haushiku (1932–2002), Namibian Roman Catholic bishop and archbishop
- Bonifacius Cornelis de Jonge (1875–1958), Dutch politician and Governor-General of the Dutch East Indies

== See also ==
- Boniface (name)
