= Tabernacle =

Temporary dwelling used by Israelites in the biblical Book of Exodus

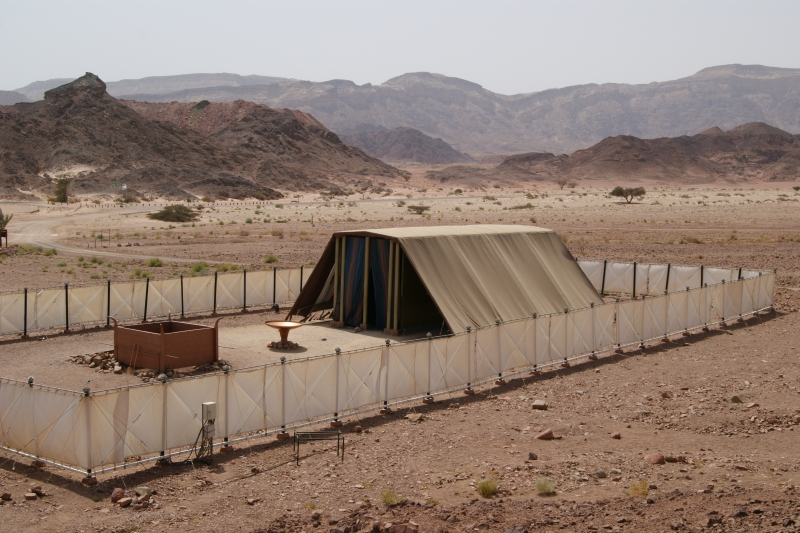
Model of the tabernacle in Timna Valley Park, Israel

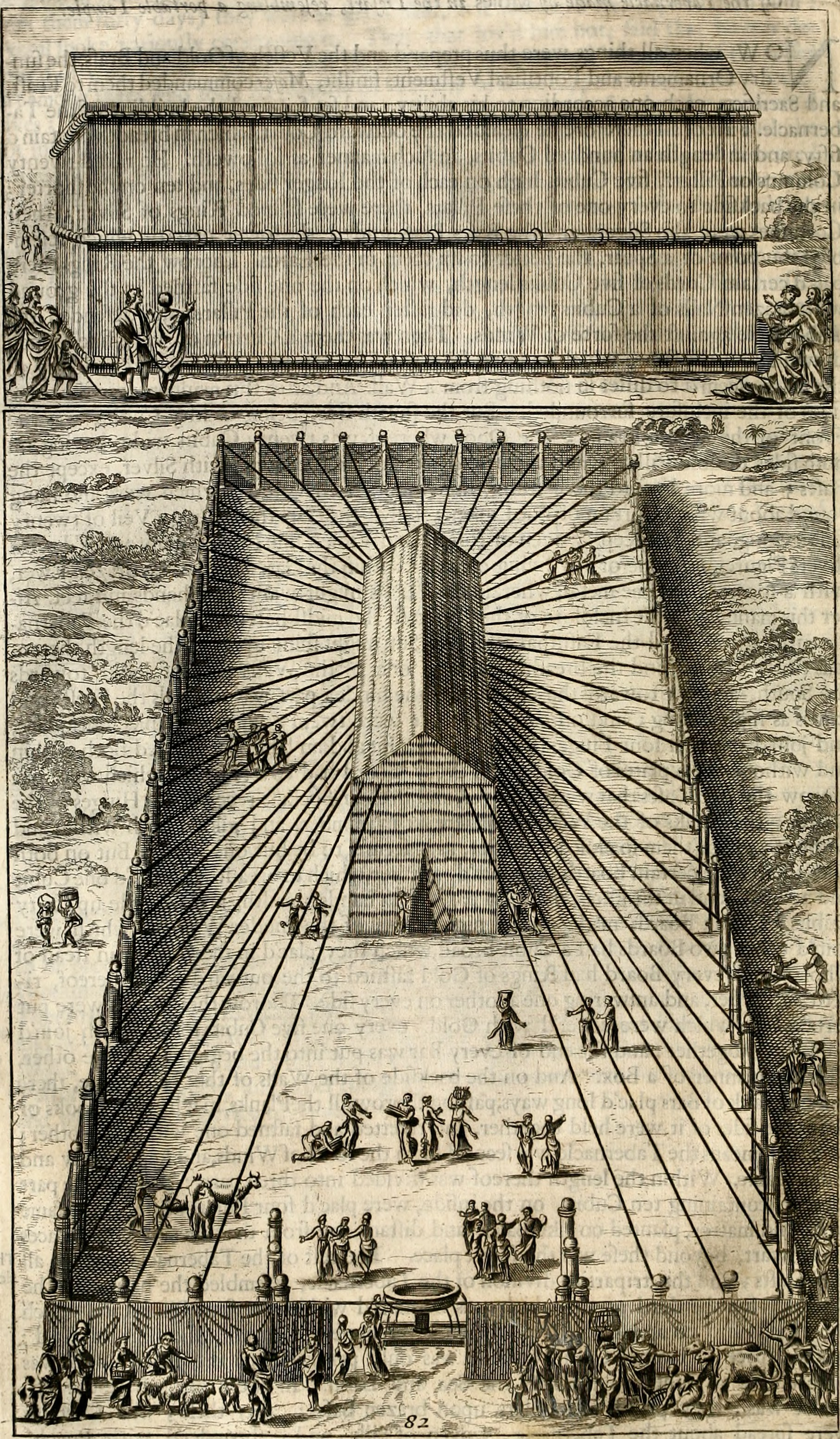
The tabernacle, engraving from Robert Arnauld d'Andilly's 1683 translation of Josephus.

According to the Hebrew Bible, the Tabernacle (Hebrew: מִשְׁכָּן, romanized: miškān, lit. 'residence, dwelling place'), also known as the Tent of the Congregation (Hebrew: אֹהֶל מוֹעֵד, romanized: ˌʔohel-mōˈʕēḏ, also Tent of Meeting), was the portable earthly dwelling of Yahweh used by the Israelites from the Exodus until the conquest of Canaan. According to Numbers 4:1-35, Moses was instructed at Mount Sinai to construct and transport the Tabernacle with the Israelites on their journey through the wilderness and their subsequent conquest of the Promised Land.

Based on 1 Kings 6:1, biblical literalists hold that after either 480 (according to the Masoretic Text (𝕸)) or 440 years (according to the Septuagint (LXX)), Solomon's Temple in Jerusalem superseded it as God's dwelling-place.

The main source describing the tabernacle is the Book of Exodus, specifically Exodus 25–31 and 35–40. Those passages describe the Holy of Holies, a sanctum sanctorum to Yahweh. It was created by the parochet, a curtain or veil suspended by four pillars. The Holy of Holies contained the Ark of the Covenant, with its cherubim-covered mercy seat. An outer sanctuary (the 'Holy Place') contained a gold lamp-stand or candlestick. On the north side stood a table, on which lay the showbread. On the south side was the menorah, which held seven oil lamps for light. On the west side, just before the veil, was the golden altar of incense. It was constructed of four woven layers of curtains and forty-eight 4.6 m (15 ft) tall standing wooden boards overlaid in gold and held in place by its bars and silver sockets. The altar was richly furnished with valuable materials taken from Egypt at God's command.

Historically, according to scholars like Mark S. Smith, William G. Dever and archaeological discoveries, the Tabernacle was based on similar tent shrines from other cultures in the ancient MENA such as Canaan (now the Levant), Babylonia (now in Lower Mesopotamia), and ancient Egypt. These portable shrines would house respective deities, with this custom both predating and surrounding the ancient Israelites. The Midianite tent shrine of Hathor at Timna Valley in southern Israel, which is being excavated by the Madain Project, is an example.

== Meaning ==
The English word tabernacle derives from the Latin tabernāculum (meaning "tent" or "hut"), which in ancient Roman religion was a ritual structure. The Hebrew word mishkan implies "dwell", "rest", or "to live in". In Greek, including the Septuagint, the Hebrew is translated σκηνή (skēnē), itself a Semitic loanword meaning "tent".

Biblical scholar Michael B. Hundley argues that the Priestly source uses the terms "tabernacle" and "tent of meeting" in a complementary way to emphasize the sacred tent’s dual function as a divine dwelling place on earth and a place where the resident deity meets with his people.

Dr. Hacham Isaac S. D. Sassoon argued that the Priestly source’s focus on the Tabernacle, rather than the Temple, serves as a post-exilic critique of the idea of rebuilding a stationary Temple, presenting the mobile Tabernacle as a divinely-ordained permanent structure for the Israelites.

== Description ==
A detailed description of a tabernacle, located in Exodus chapters 25–27 and Exodus chapters 35–40, refers to an inner shrine, the Holy of Holies, housing the ark, and an outer chamber with the six-branch seven-lamp Temple menorah, table for showbread, and an altar of incense. An enclosure containing the sacrificial altar and bronze laver for the priests to wash surrounded these chambers.

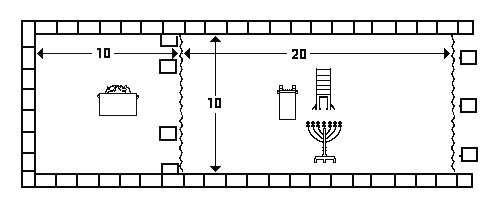
Layout of the tabernacle with the Holy of Holies

Traditional scholars contend that it describes an actual tabernacle used in the time of Moses and thereafter. This view is based on the existence of significant parallels between the biblical Tabernacle and similar structures from ancient Egypt during the Late Bronze Age.

The detailed outlines for the tabernacle and its priests are enumerated in the Book of Exodus:

- Exodus 25: Materials needed: the Ark, the table for 12 showbread, the menorah.
- Exodus 26: The tabernacle, the bars, partitions.
- Exodus 27: The copper altar, the enclosure, oil.
- Exodus 28: Vestments for the priests, ephod garment, ring settings, the breastplate, robe, head-plate, tunic, turban, sashes, pants.
- Exodus 29: Consecration of priests and altar.
- Exodus 30: Incense altar, washstand, anointing oil, incense.

Liane Feldman holds that there are contrasting descriptions of the Meeting Tent in the Pentateuch, where the Priestly source presents a large, ornate tent at the center of the Israelite community, while a non-priestly strand describes a smaller, simpler tent for Moses, which in her view demonstrates the composite nature of the Pentateuch and differing perspectives within it.

Benjamin D. Sommer suggests that while the Holy of Holies in the tabernacle was reserved for God’s presence, the main room featured a metal menorah with six branches on each side, potentially echoing the asherah, which he thinks was used in the cult of Yahweh.

== Tent of the Presence ==
Some interpreters assert the Tent of the Presence was a special meeting place outside the camp, unlike the Tabernacle which was placed in the center of the camp. According to Exodus 33:7–11, this tent was for communion with Yahweh, to receive oracles and to understand the divine will. The people's elders were the subject of a remarkable prophetic event at the site of this tent in Numbers 11:24–30.

== Builders ==
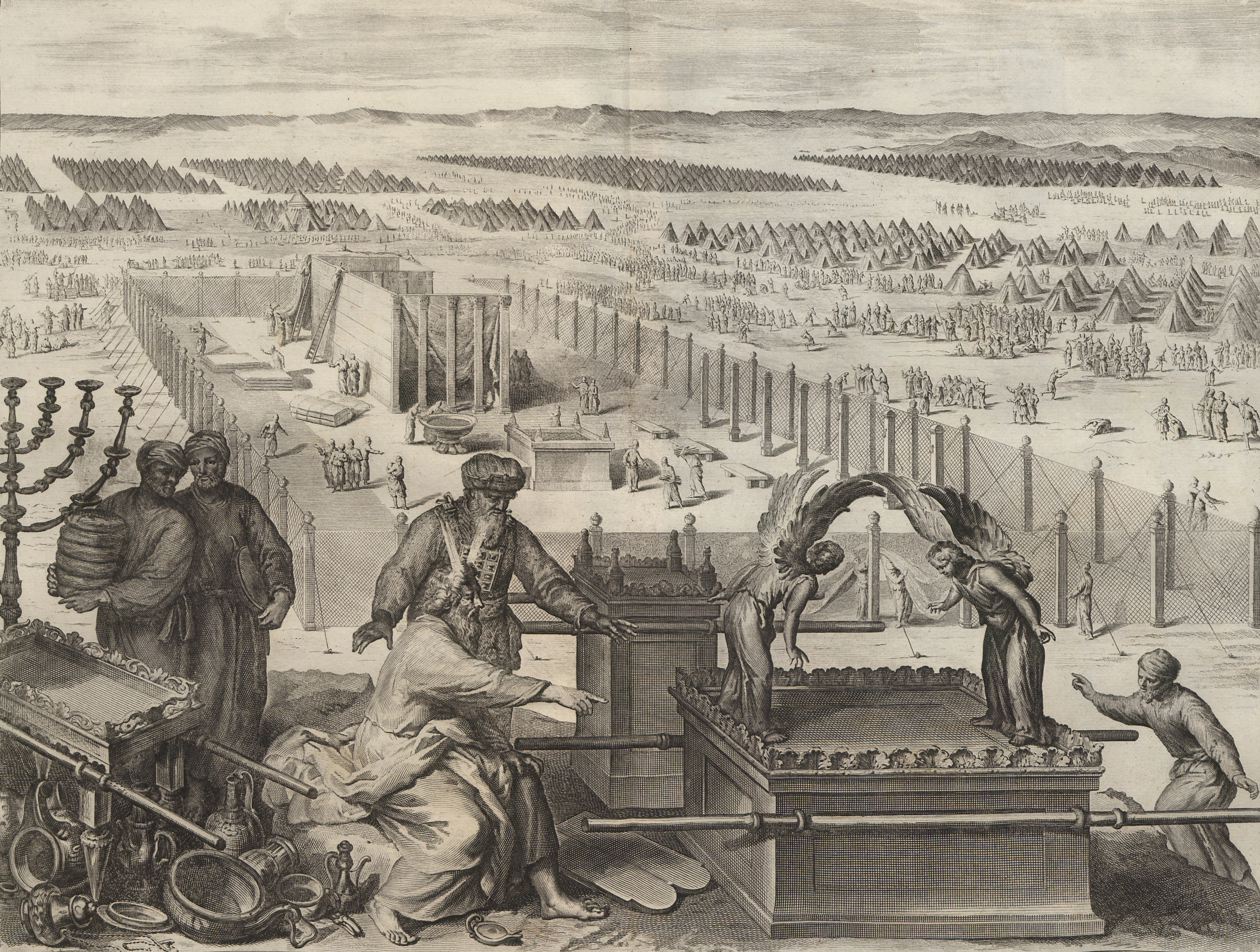
The erection of the tabernacle and the Sacred vessels, as in Exodus 40:17–19; from the 1728 Figures de la Bible

In Exodus 31, the main builder and maker of the priestly vestments is specified as Bezalel, son of Uri son of Hur of the tribe of Judah, who was assisted by Oholiab and a number of skilled artisans.

== Plan ==
During the Exodus, the wandering in the desert and the conquest of Canaan, the Tabernacle was in part a portable tent, and in part a wooden enclosure draped with ten curtains, of blue (tekhelet תְּכֵלֶת), purple (’argāmān אַרְגָּמָן), and scarlet (šānî שָׁנִי) fabric. It had a rectangular, perimeter fence of fabric, poles and staked cords. This rectangle was always erected when the Israelite tribes would camp, oriented to the east as the east side had no frames. In the center of this enclosure was a rectangular sanctuary draped with goat-hair curtains, with the roof coverings made from rams' skins.

=== Holy of Holies ===
Beyond this curtain was the cube-shaped inner room, the Kodesh Hakedashim (Holy of Holies). This area housed the Ark of the Covenant, inside which were the two stone tablets brought down from Mount Sinai by Moses on which were written the Ten Commandments, a golden urn holding the manna, and Aaron's rod which had budded and borne ripe almonds (Exodus 16:33–34, Numbers 17:1–11, Deuteronomy 10:1–5; Hebrews 9:2–5).

=== Tachash ===
Tachash is referred to fifteen times in the Hebrew Bible; 13 of these refer to the roof coverings.

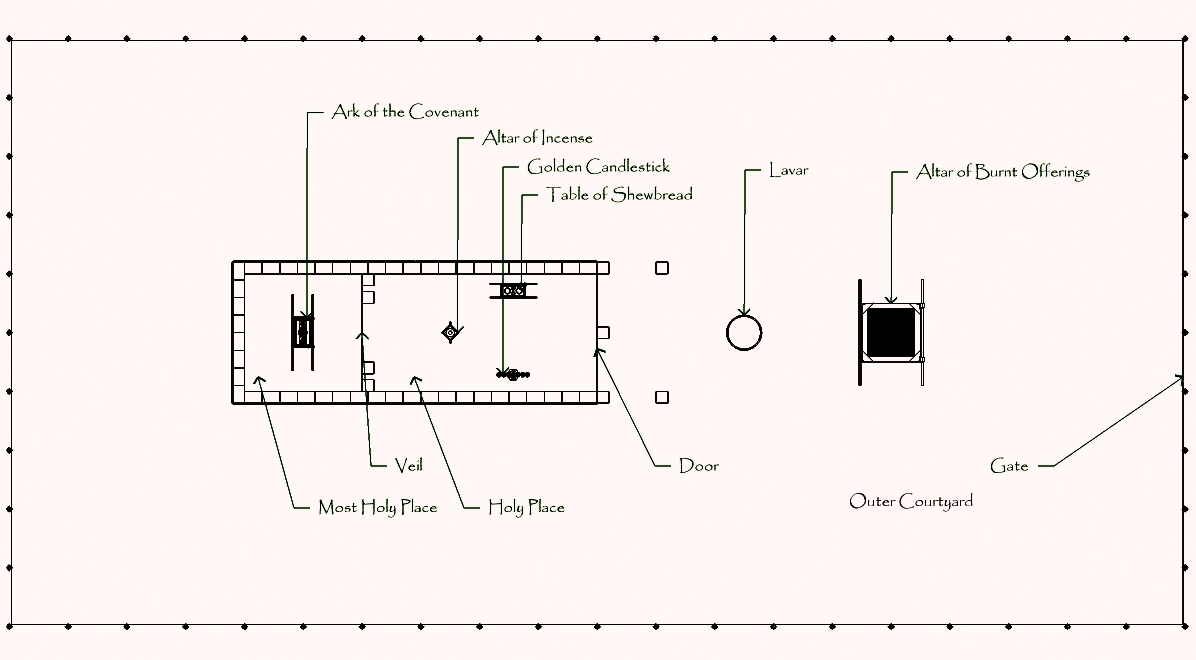
Top view, parallel projection of tabernacle.

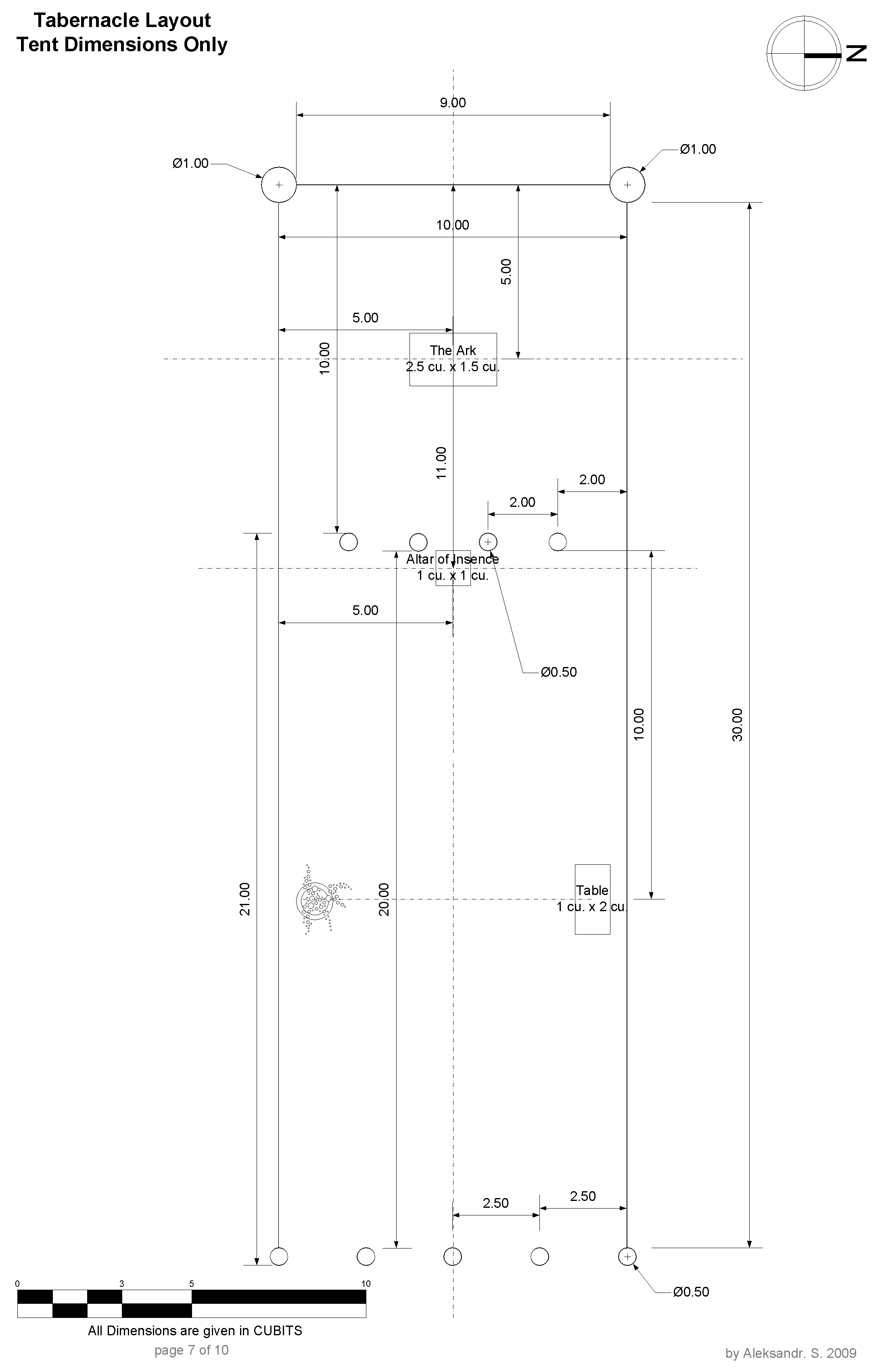
Tabernacle Tent dimensions according to the Book of Exodus

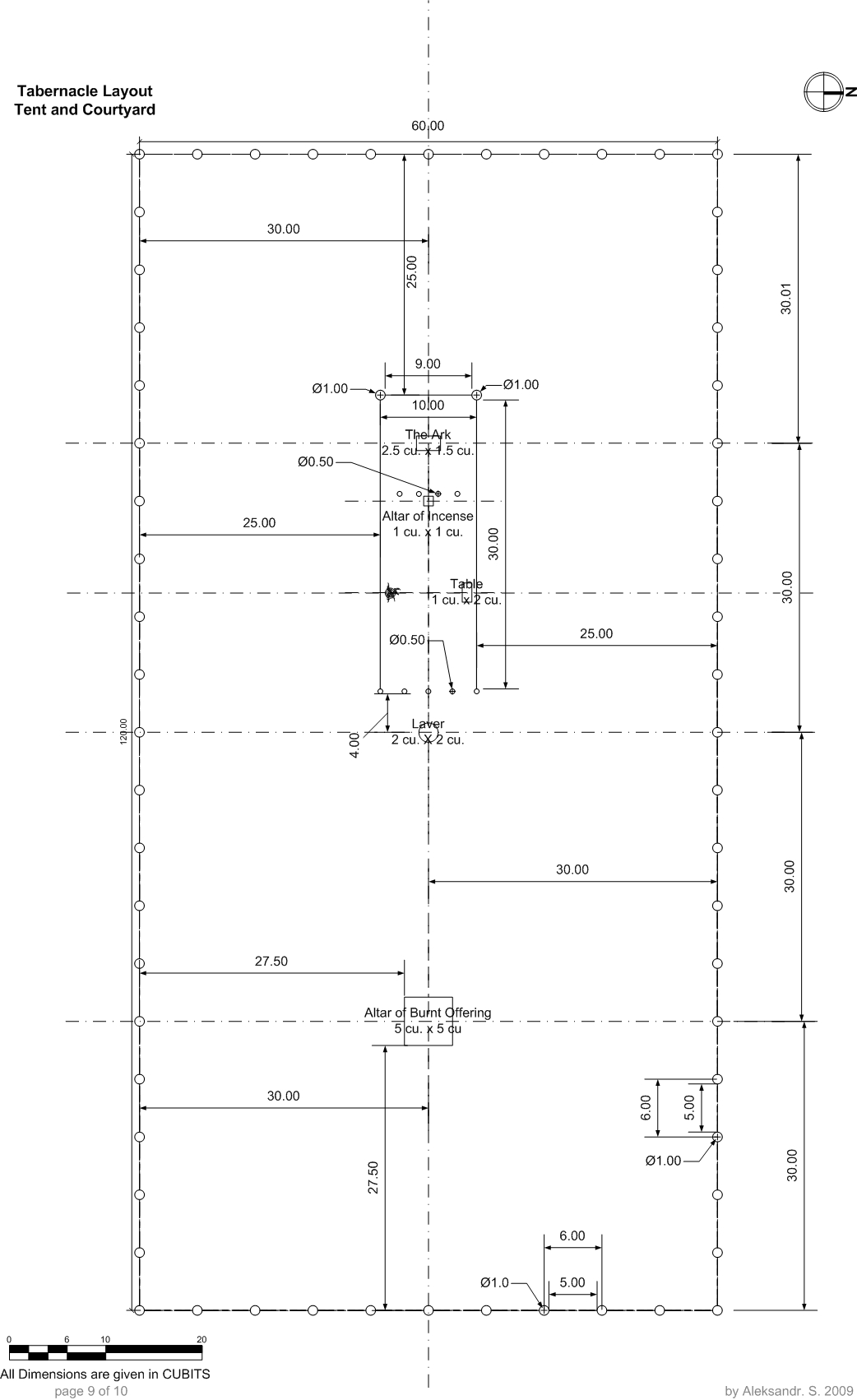
Tabernacle Tent and Courtyard dimensions according to the Book of Exodus

== Restrictions ==
- Wine forbidden to priests in the tabernacle: Leviticus 10:8–15
- Individuals with the Tzaraat skin affliction were not permitted entry to the tabernacle: Leviticus 22:4
- Sacrifice only at the tabernacle: Leviticus 17
- Priests could only enter into the third room of the tent once a year: Leviticus 16

There is a strict set of rules to be followed for transporting the tabernacle laid out in the Hebrew Bible. For example:

You must put the Levites in charge of the tabernacle of the Covenant, along with its furnishings and equipment. They must carry the tabernacle and its equipment as you travel, and they must care for it and camp around it. Whenever the Tabernacle is moved, the Levites will take it down and set it up again. Anyone else who goes too near the tabernacle will be executed.

— Numbers 1:48–51 NLT

== Rituals ==
Twice a day, a priest would stand in front of the golden prayer altar and burn fragrant incense. Other procedures were also carried out in the tabernacle:

- The daily meal offering: Leviticus 6:8–30
- Guilt offerings and peace offerings: Leviticus 7
- Ceremony of Ordination: Leviticus 8
- Octave of Ordination: Leviticus 9
- Yom Kippur: Leviticus 16
- Ordeal of the bitter water for suspected adulteresses: Numbers 5:11–29
- Dedication of Nazirites: Numbers 6:1–21
- Preparation of the ashes of a red heifer for the water of purification: Numbers 19

An Israelite healed of tzaraath would be presented by the priest who had confirmed his healing "at the door of the tabernacle of meeting", and a woman healed of prolonged menstruation would present her offering (two turtledoves or two young pigeons) to the priest "at the door of the tabernacle of meeting".

It was at the door of the tabernacle that the community wept in sorrow when all the chiefs of the people were impaled and the men who had joined in worship to the Baal of Peor were killed on God's orders.

== Subsequent history ==
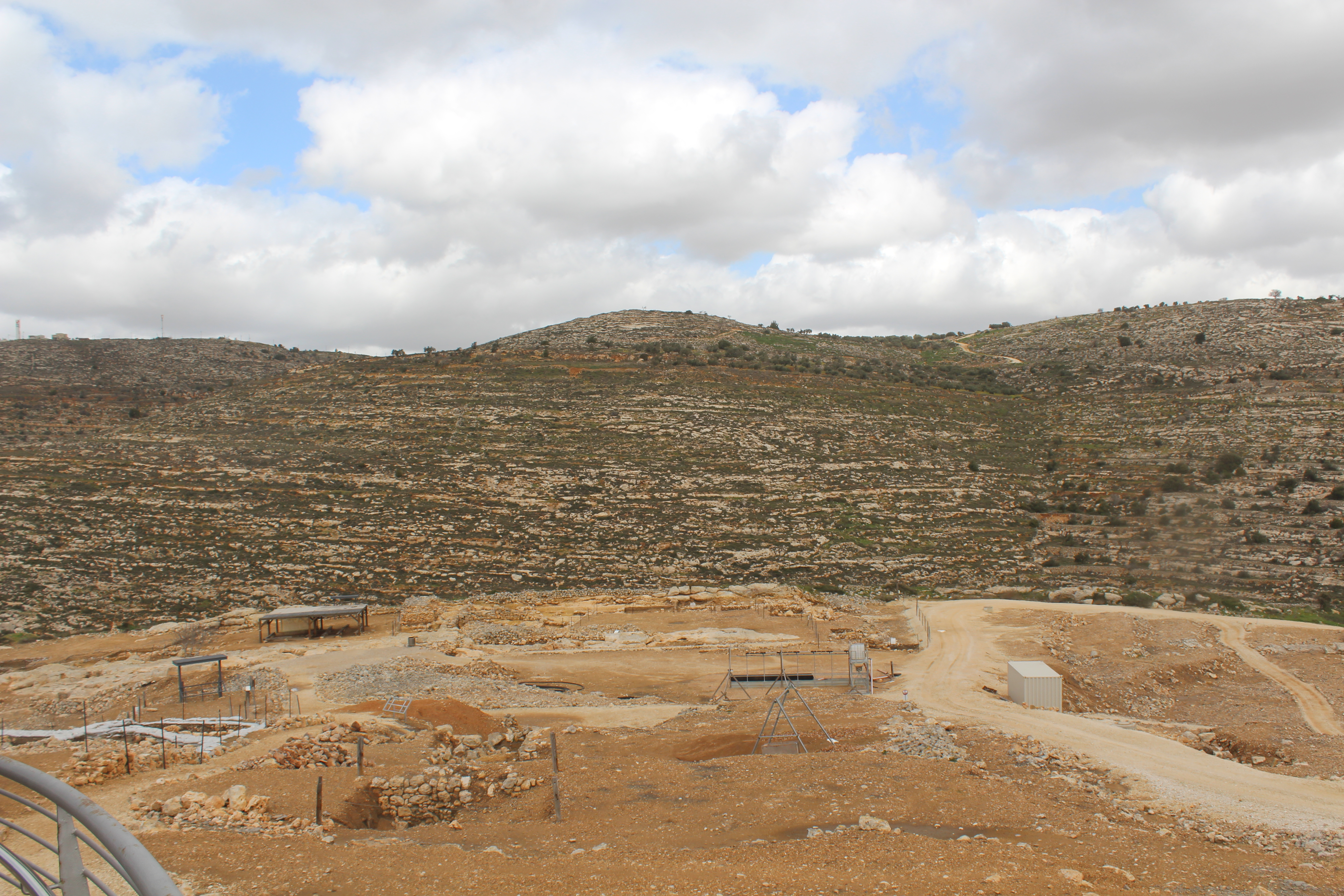
Location and remains of the Tabernacle at Shiloh, 2019

During the conquest of Canaan, the main Israelite camp was at Gilgal (Joshua 4:19; 5:8–10) and the tabernacle was probably erected within the camp: Joshua 10:43ESV "…and returned into the camp" (see Numbers 1:52–2:34 "…they shall camp facing the tent of meeting on every side").

After the conquest and division of the land among the tribes, the tabernacle was moved to Shiloh in Ephraimite territory (Joshua's tribe) to avoid disputes among the other tribes (Joshua 18:1; 19:51; 22:9; Psalm 78:60). It remained there during most of the rule of the Judges. According to a possible translation of Judges 20:26–28, the Ark, and thus the tabernacle, was at Bethel while Phinehas, grandson of Aaron, was alive.

After the Ark of the Covenant was captured by the Philistines, the subsequent history of the tabernacle is separate from that of the Ark, even after the latter was returned. Under King Saul, the tabernacle was eventually moved to Nob, near Saul's home town of Gibeah, but after he massacred the priests there (1 Samuel 21–22), it was moved to Gibeon, a hill-shrine (1 Chronicles 16:39; 21:29; 2 Chronicles 1:2–6, 13). Just prior to David's moving the ark to Jerusalem, the ark was located in Kiriath-Jearim (1 Chronicles 13:5–6).

The Ark was eventually brought to Jerusalem, where it was placed "inside the tent David had pitched for it" (2 Samuel 6:17; 1 Chronicles 15:1), not in the tabernacle, which remained at Gibeon. The altar of the tabernacle at Gibeon was used for sacrificial worship (1 Chronicles 16:39; 21:29; 1 Kings 3:2–4), until Solomon brought the structure and its furnishings to Jerusalem to furnish and dedicate the Temple (1 Kings 8:4).

There is no mention of the tabernacle in the Tanakh after the destruction of Jerusalem and the Temple by the Babylonians in c. 587 BCE.

Scholars believe that the tabernacle as described may have never existed, but it does reflect Jerusalem cultic iconography and objects, and thus has some historical basis.

== Relationship to the golden calf ==
Some rabbis have commented on the proximity of the narrative of the tabernacle with that of the episode known as the sin of the golden calf recounted in Exodus 32:1–6. Maimonides asserts that the tabernacle and its accoutrements, such as the golden Ark of the Covenant and the golden Menorah were meant as "alternates" to the human weakness and needs for physical idols as seen in the golden calf episode. Other scholars, such as Nachmanides, disagree and maintain that the tabernacle's meaning is not tied in with the golden calf, but instead symbolizes higher mystical lessons that symbolize God's constant closeness to the Children of Israel.

== Blueprint for synagogues ==
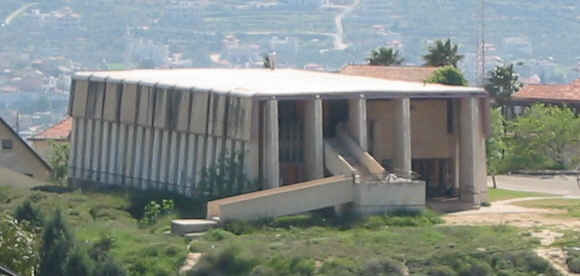
The Mishkan Shilo synagogue in Shilo is a replica of the Jewish Temple

Synagogue construction over the last two thousand years has followed the outlines of the original tabernacle. Every synagogue has at its front an ark, aron kodesh, containing the Torah scrolls, comparable to the Ark of the Covenant which contained the tablets with Ten Commandments. This is the holiest spot in a synagogue, equivalent to the Holy of Holies.

There is also usually a constantly lighted lamp, Ner tamid, or a candelabrum, lighted during services, near a spot similar to the position of the original Menorah. At the center of the synagogue is a large elevated area, known as the bimah, where the Torah is read. This is equivalent to the tabernacle's altars upon which incense and animal sacrifices were offered. On the main holidays the priests gather at the front of the synagogue to bless the congregation as did their priestly ancestors in the tabernacle from Aaron onwards (Numbers 6:22–27).

== Inspiration for churches ==
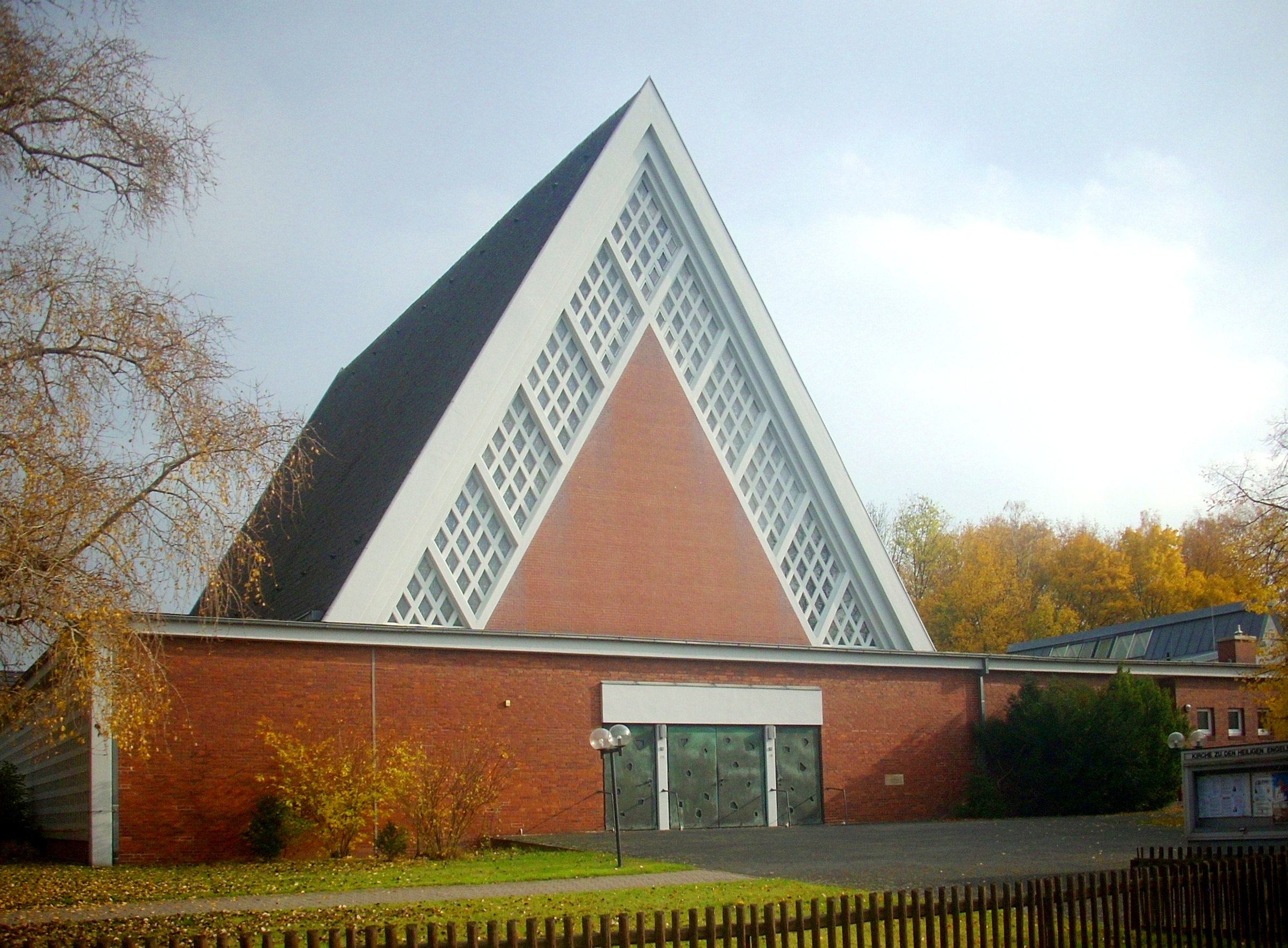
Zu den heiligen Engeln, Hanover, completed 1964

Some Christian churches are built like a tent, to symbolize the tent of God with men, including St. Matthew Cathedral, São Mateus, Brazil, Zu den heiligen Engeln (To the Holy Angels), Hanover, Germany and the Cardboard Cathedral, Christchurch, New Zealand.

== Mandaeism ==
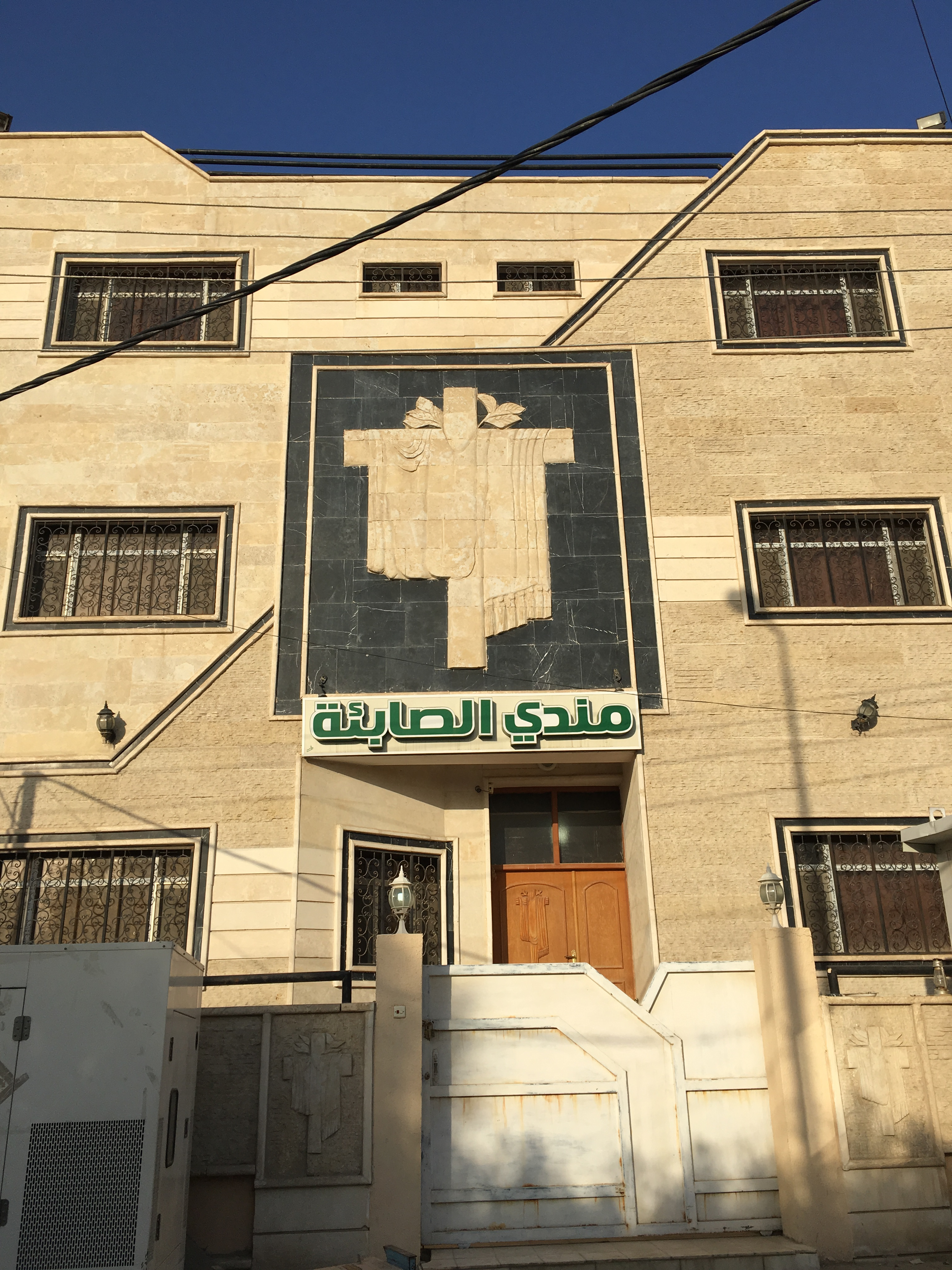
Mandaean Mashkhanna (Beth Manda) in Nasiriya, Iraq

A mashkhanna ࡌࡀࡔࡊࡍࡀ maškna (Hebrew cognate מִשְׁכַּן mishkān), Beth Manda ࡁࡉࡕ ࡌࡀࡍࡃࡀ, Beit Manda, or Mandi ('house of knowledge'), is a cultic hut and place of worship for followers of Mandaeism. A Mashkhanna must be built beside a river in order to perform maṣbuta (baptism) and other ceremonies because Living Water is an essential element in the Mandaean faith.

== See also ==
- Church tabernacle
- Priestly covenant
- Replicas of the Jewish Temple
- Tabernacle (LDS Church)
- Tabernacle (Methodist)
