= Boniface Berthin Zakahely =

Malagasy politician

Boniface Berthin Zakahely is a Malagasy politician. A member of the National Assembly of Madagascar, he was elected as an independent in the 2002 Malagasy parliamentary election and 2007 Malagasy parliamentary election. He represents the constituency of Mananara Avaratra.

In 2019 Malagasy parliamentary election he was a candidate in the same constituency for the AREMA but obtained only 23,55% of the votes and was not elected.
