= Maria Boniecka =

Polish author and teacher

Maria Antonina Boniecka (19 June 1910 – 19 June 1978) was a Polish author and teacher, who also served in the Polish Home Army during the Second World War. She received several awards, including the Silver Cross of Merit, the Home Army Cross, the Szczecin Literary Award, and a Gold Award from the Towarzystwo Wiedzy Powszechnej (Society for Universal Knowledge). Opposed to Communism, she was persecuted by the Polish government of the time; among other things, she lost her position as editor of the periodical Ziemia i Morze and was taken to court over an article published therein. She emigrated to Australia in 1965, where she wrote her memoir, Ucieczka za Druty.

== Life and career ==
Boniecka studied in Warsaw where she finished a degree in pedagogy in 1934, and then obtained a master's degree in philosophy in 1937. From 1928 Boniecka worked as a teacher in adult education in Warsaw, and in 1937 she was awarded the Silver Cross of Merit for her work with illiterate adults.

Boniecka spent the occupation in Warsaw. Though she served the resistance from 1940, she officially joined the Polish Home Army in 1942, and was later awarded the Home Army Cross.

During 1946–1949, Boniecka taught Polish at a secondary school, and was in charge of the student literary circle, one of whose members was Włodzimierz Odojewski, who was to become a distinguished author and who, like Boniecka, would emigrate. In 1959 she received the Szczecin Literary Award. Up until 1963 she delivered lectures on various subjects including literary history, earning her a Gold Award from the Towarzystwo Wiedzy Powszechnej (Society for Universal Knowledge) in 1960.

During the political "thaw" known as Polish October, Boniecka was chosen to be the first editor of the socio-literary weekly Ziemia i Morze (Land and Sea) in the city of Szczecin. In 1957, she was removed from this position in absentia, for "political transgressions regarding the issue of Hungary, censorship, elections, inadequate condemnation of erroneous tendencies, failing to consult with the State Committee (KW) in regards to editorial politics, failing to bring the publication in line with the party line...". A few weeks after losing her job, Boniecka was taken to court over an article she published in Ziemia i Morze which exposed the appalling conditions existing in the local education system. The court found in favour of Boniecka.

As time progressed, the efforts of the communist state to intimidate Boniecka increased. In 1960, the party confiscated a number of her manuscripts. In 1963 she was placed on a blacklist preventing her from being published and from giving lectures, and in 1964 her pension was revoked, effectively depriving her of income. Also in 1963 an unruly tenant, backed by the communist party, took up residence in her home, verbally and physically abusing Boniecka and her family. In an effort to get the man evicted, she took him to court in 1964, but the proceedings dragged on until 1966 (finding in her favour), by which time she had left the country. In 1964 she tried to take her own life, but was medically revived.

In 1965 Boniecka succeeded in an attempt to leave the country. Together with her husband and daughter, she emigrated to Australia to join her other children. She subsequently published in various Polish-language publications on political subjects, both in Australia and abroad. Her last book, Ucieczka za Druty (Escape across the [barbed] wire), a work of creative non-fiction, was written in Sydney, and published in London in 1975.

== Selected works ==
- Synkretyzm myślenia dorosłego analfabety (1936)
- Fantazja w rysunkach dorosłych uczniów szkół wieczorowych (1937)
- Wpływ dziedziczności psychicznej na przestępczość nieletnich (1938)
- Zmiany psychopatyczne jako motyw przestępczości nieletnich (1938)
- Nad Wielkim Zalewem (1950)
- Szklane kulki (1955)
- Domy przy szosie (1956)
- Na jarmarku odpustowym (1956)
- Księga miłości i cierpienia (1958)
- Ucieczka za druty (1975)
