= Maria Albin Boniecki =

Polish artist

Maria Albin Bończa-Boniecki (1908–1995) was a Polish artist. A survivor of the Nazi concentration camp Majdanek, he took part in the Warsaw Uprising and upon liberation from German POW camps settled in Paris. He emigrated to the United States of America in 1957.

== Biography ==
=== Early life ===
Boniecki's father, Antoni a Polish patriot, was deported to Siberia when Boniecki was five. Boniecki's mother, Stanisława, chose to follow with her children. The circumstances following the Russian Revolution produced an opportunity for Boniecki, his mother and his siblings to slip away. With much difficulty they found a way to Poland, arriving in 1921.

Boniecki studied at the Academy of Fine Arts in Warsaw, and graduated in 1929. He produced many sculptures before the war, notably Birth of Thought, presently held at the National Museum, Warsaw. He was awarded a permanent membership of Zachęta, the Polish Masters National Museum of Fine Arts.

=== World War II ===
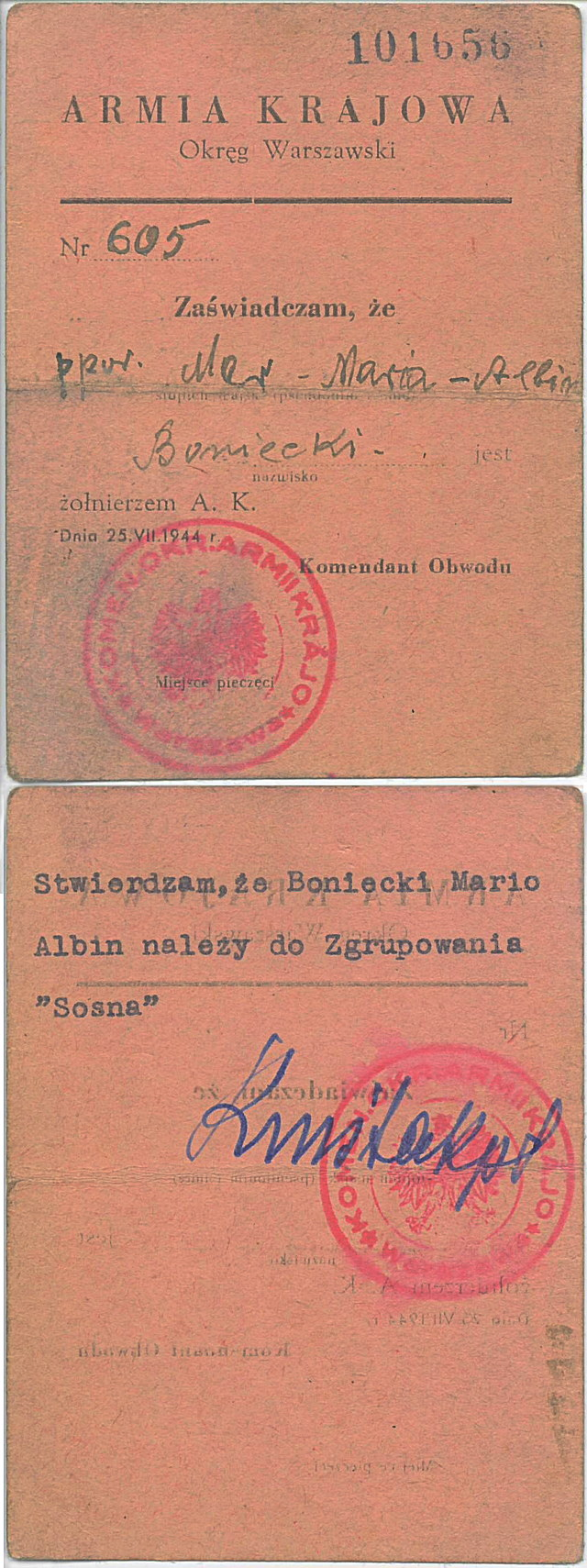
Boniecki's Polish Home Army card

After the war broke out, Boniecki joined the Polish underground resistance. In 1939 he worked as a volunteer medic, and from 1940 to 1942 took part in counterintelligence in Warsaw, Sub-district II under the pseudonym "Adam".

He was arrested by the Gestapo in October 1942 and imprisoned and interrogated at the infamous Pawiak prison. Thence he was sent to Majdanek concentration camp.

Despite being a subject of Nazi experiments and appalling conditions at the camp, Boniecki continued fashioning sculptures out of whatever he could find to encourage hope and endurance in his fellow prisoners, and in memory of those murdered. His heavily symbolic sculptures included:

- The Frog (fountain)
- The Tortoise
- The Three Eagles Mausoleum (also known as the Column of Three Eagles)
- The Seal with Fish
- The Lizard
- The Shrine

When presented with an opportunity, Boniecki proposed a sculpture of three eagles to the camp officials, who accepted the offer, believing the eagles were a German symbol. But the Three Eagles Mausoleum that he produced symbolized, among other things, the freedom of Poland, brotherhood, and triumph. Some human ashes of the victims of the gas chambers were secretly placed within the sculpture.

The Three Eagles Mausoleum was destroyed after the war and a reconstruction was created in 1962 by Stanisław Strzyżyński, by order of the Polish government and against Boniecki's wishes. This reconstruction (see External links) remains on display at the Majdanek Museum.

At the same time, Boniecki was the chief of section V of Wachlarz, and gathered information within the camp for delegates of the Polish government-in-exile. Information was smuggled in and out of the camp routinely.

With the help of the Polish Home Army, Boniecki escaped in 1944 and, rather than fleeing the country, resumed his counterintelligence activities. He took part in the Warsaw Uprising and was again captured by the Nazis. He passed through the German prisoner-of-war camps at Lamsdorf, Gross Born, and finally Sandbostel, where he was liberated by British forces.

=== Post-war ===
Boniecki settled in Paris where he met his artist wife Krystyna Boniecki (née Binental), daughter of the noted musicologist, Leopold Binental, himself murdered with his wife, Krystyna's mother, at Auschwitz concentration camp. The Bonieckis continued sculpting and painting, and also developed educational toys for children, among them a tactile alphabet for the blind.

In 1957 the couple moved to Denver, USA, and became US citizens in 1964. Later they moved to Tulsa, Oklahoma. He died aged 87 and was buried in Rose Hill Cemetery and Memorial Park, Tulsa, Oklahoma.

== Solo exhibits ==
- "Polish Masters Exhibitions", National Art Museum in Warsaw
- "Polish Artists Exhibitions", National Art Gallery in Warsaw
- City Hall in Polish Silesia, Bielsko-Biała
- "Exhibition of Polish Artists Association in Paris", Polish Seminary in Paris
- "Esposizione Internazionale di Arte Sacra", Pontificia Academia del Pantheon, Rome
- International House, Denver, Colorado
- Englewood State Bank, Englewood, Colorado
- "Millenium of Poland", Colorado University, Boulder, Colorado
- Creative Art Gallery, Denver, Colorado

== Permanent works available in public space ==
- The Tortoise, State Museum at Majdanek (original concrete)
- The Column of Three Eagles, State Museum at Majdanek (reconstruction)
- The Lizard, State Museum at Majdanek (original concrete)
- St. Francis D'Assises, Museum in Rome (model, bronze)
- Annunciation, Polish Church in Rome (tabernacle, bronze)
- Tribute to General Marquis de Lafeyette, Civic Center Park, Denver, Colorado (plaque, bronze - see External Links)
- St. Francis D'Assises, Museum in Rome (model, bronze)
- The Seal, in front of the Children's Hospital, Lublin (fountain, bronze)

== Military awards ==
- Cross of Valor (London, 1942)
- Cross of Valor (1944)
