= Bonifaz =

Bonifaz is surname and a variation of the name Bonifatius. Notable people with the surname include:

- John Bonifaz (born 1966), Boston-based attorney and political activist
- Rubén Bonifaz Nuño (1923–2013), Mexican poet and classical scholar
- Ramón de Bonifaz (1196–1252 or 1256), medieval Spanish naval leader
- Santiago Alba y Bonifaz (1872–1949), Spanish politician, lawyer, and politician
