= Saint Boniface (disambiguation) =

Saint Boniface (c. 675? – 754), known as the "Apostle to the Germans", was an important figure in early Christianity.

Saint Boniface, Saint-Boniface or St. Boniface may also refer to:

== Other saints ==
- Boniface of Brussels (1183–1260)
- Boniface of Tarsus, martyred in 307, according to legend
- Boniface, 5th century African martyr (died 484)
- Bruno of Querfurt (970–1009), also known as Boniface, sainted missionary bishop and martyr, the "Apostle to the Prussians"

== Places ==
- Saint Boniface, Winnipeg, Manitoba, Canada, an historically francophone neighbourhood and former city
  - Saint Boniface—Saint Vital, a federal electoral district in Winnipeg containing the area of St. Boniface, formerly called simply "St. Boniface" (1924–1996) and "Saint Boniface" (1996–2013)
  - St. Boniface (provincial electoral district), a provincial electoral district containing the northern section of the area of St. Boniface
  - Roman Catholic Archdiocese of Saint Boniface
- Saint-Boniface, Quebec, Canada, a town
- St Boniface Down, a chalk down on the Isle of Wight in the British Isles
- Saint Boniface, Pennsylvania, United States, an unincorporated community

== Churches and cathedrals ==
- St Boniface Cathedral, Bunbury, Western Australia, Australia
- Saint Boniface Cathedral, St. Boniface, Winnipeg, Manitoba, Canada
- St. Boniface Church (disambiguation)

== Schools ==
- Université de Saint-Boniface, St. Boniface, Winnipeg, a French-language post-secondary institution
- St Boniface College, a secondary school in the Kavango Region of Namibia
- St Boniface's College, a secondary school in Plymouth, Devon, UK
- St Boniface Missionary College, Warminster, Wiltshire, UK, a former Anglican educational institution

== Other uses ==
- HMCS St. Boniface (J332), a Canadian Second World War minesweeper
- Saint Boniface Hospital, Manitoba, Canada
- St. Boniface College, a fictional Oxbridge college in Pendennis by William Thackeray

== See also ==
- St. Bonifacius, Minnesota, United States, a city
