= St. Jakobi, Kirchrode =

St. Jacobi
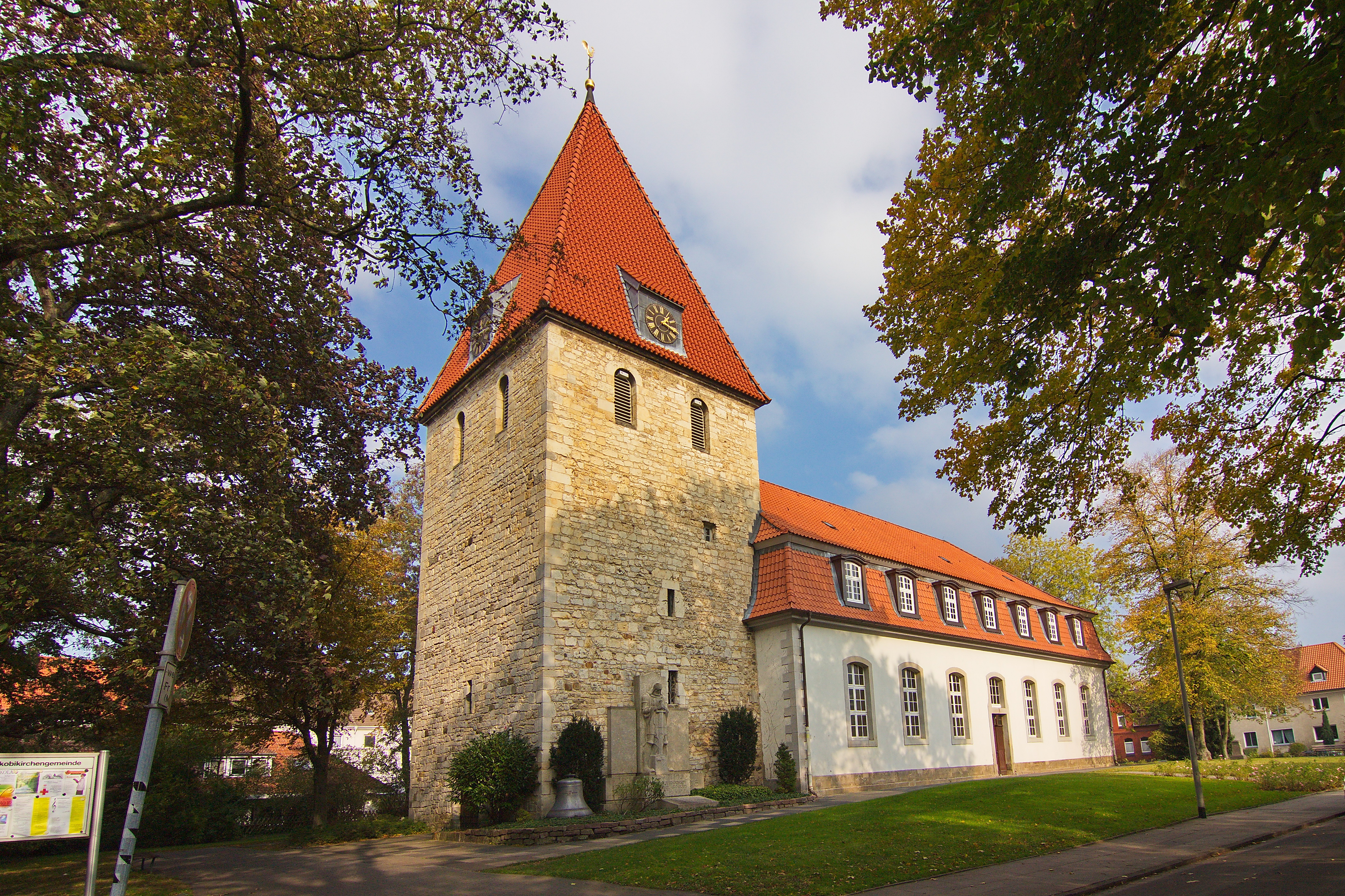
- The church with its medieval steeple
- St. Jacobi
- 52°21′31″N 9°49′35″E
- Location: Hanover-Kirchrode
- Country: Germany
- Denomination: Lutheran
- Previous denomination: Catholic
- Website: www.jakobi-kirchrode.de

Architecture
- Style: medieval; baroque

St. Jakobi is the name of a Lutheran parish and church in Hannover-Kirchrode, Lower Saxony, Germany. It dates back to the 12th century, was remodeled in Baroque style, destroyed in World War II, and restored.

== History ==
The church dates back to the 12th century when it was first mentioned in a document of 1295. It belonged to the Diocese of Hildesheim and serve as the parish church for a region. It was dedicated to Saint James. The steeple is a medieval construction.

The parish became Lutheran during the Reformation around 1540. After the Thirty Years War, the sacristy and other adjacent buildings were demolished. In the 17th century, the church was remodeled in Baroque style, with a new pulpit, balconies and paintings. In 1679/80, H. J. Schrader created paintings, including portraits of the twelve disciples, the Ten Commandements, passion scenes, the Last Judgment, John the Baptist and Paul the Apostle. In 1701/02, the first organ was built. A sacristy was added again in 1777. From 1782, the nave was replaced, inaugurated in 1784. A new organ was completed in 1809, but it was replaced in 1888 by an instrument in Gothic Revival style by F. Becker.

The church was destroyed by Bombing in World War II on 4 November 1944, leaving only the steeple and the outer walls. It was restored in the 1950s in small steps. In 1950, the parish was split, forming a new parish St. Johannis of Bemerode. St. Jakobi was further restored from 1980. In 1989, the present organ was built by Orgelbau Hillbrand from Altwarmbüchen. Its disposition is based on works by Gottfried Silbermann. It has 24 stops (1374 pipes), on two manuals and pedal.

== Literature ==
- wolfgang Puschmann: Jakobikirche, in: Hannovers Kirchen. 140 Kirchen in Stadt und Umland. ed. Wolfgang Puschmann. Hermannsburg: Ludwig-Harm-Haus 2005, ISBN 3-937301-35-6.

== External ==
- Official website
