= Bieling Architekten =

- Company type: Architecture firm
- Founded: 1955
- Founder: Josef Bieling
- Headquarters: Kassel, Germany
- Key people: Thomas Bieling; Kurt Bieling
- Number of employees: c. 15–20
- Website: bieling-architekten.de/de/

Bieling Architekten is a German architecture firm located in Kassel, Hesse, with another office in Hamburg. Founded by Josef Bieling in 1955, the firm has projects throughout Germany. His son Thomas Bieling, a director since 2011, runs the company as a group of independent architects. Earlier names included Architekturbüro Josef Bieling, Bieling & Bieling Architekten, and Bieling & Bieling. They designed apartment buildings and offices, and became known for winning competitions for new quarters, such as Waidmarkt in Cologne and Wallhöfe in Hamburg.

== History ==
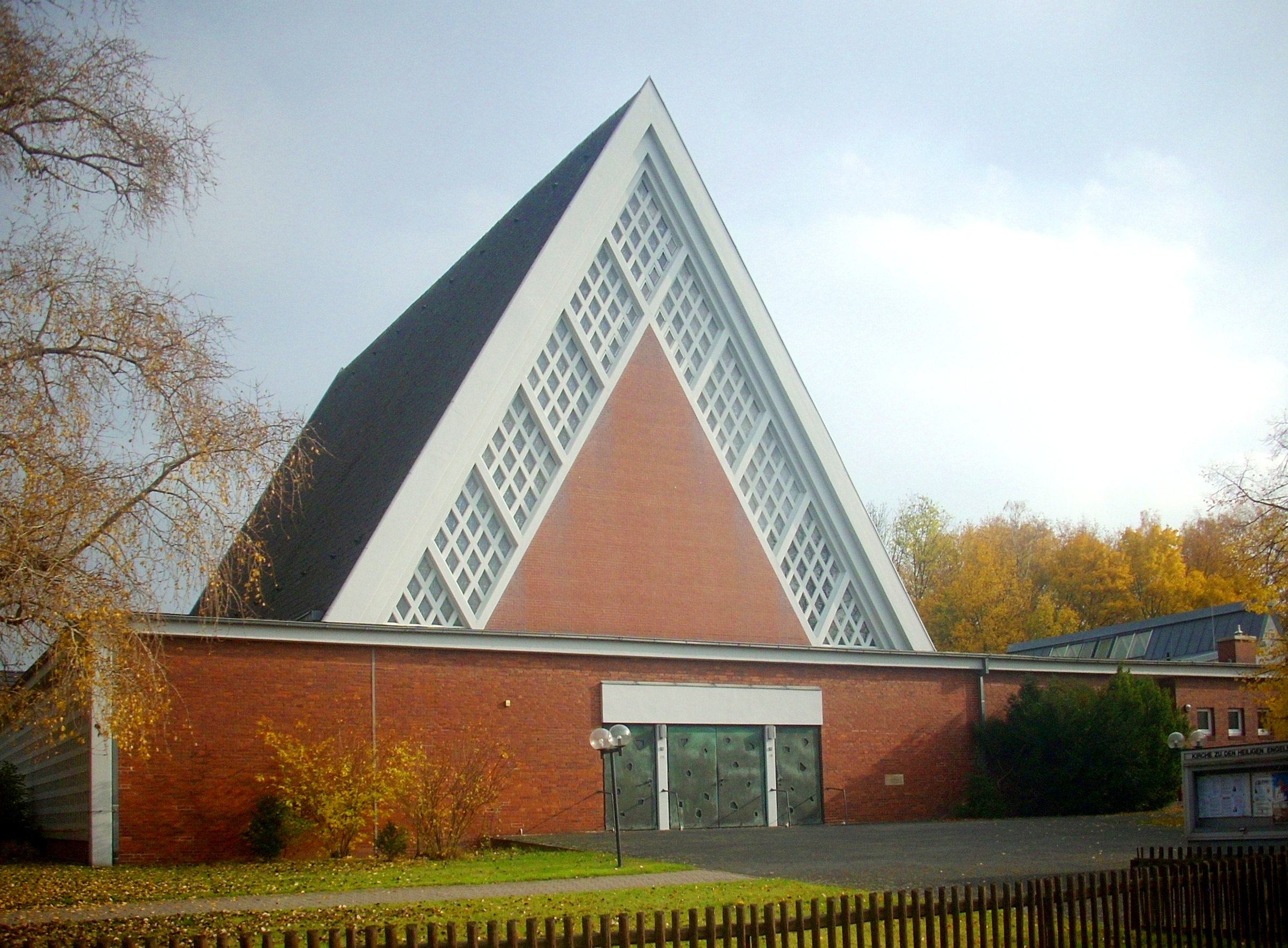
Front of Zu den heiligen Engeln in Hanover in 2011, built by Josef Bieling in 1964

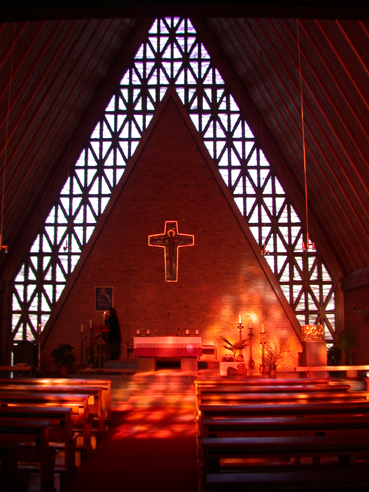
Interior of the Maria Hilf in Trutzhain, built by Bieling in 1965

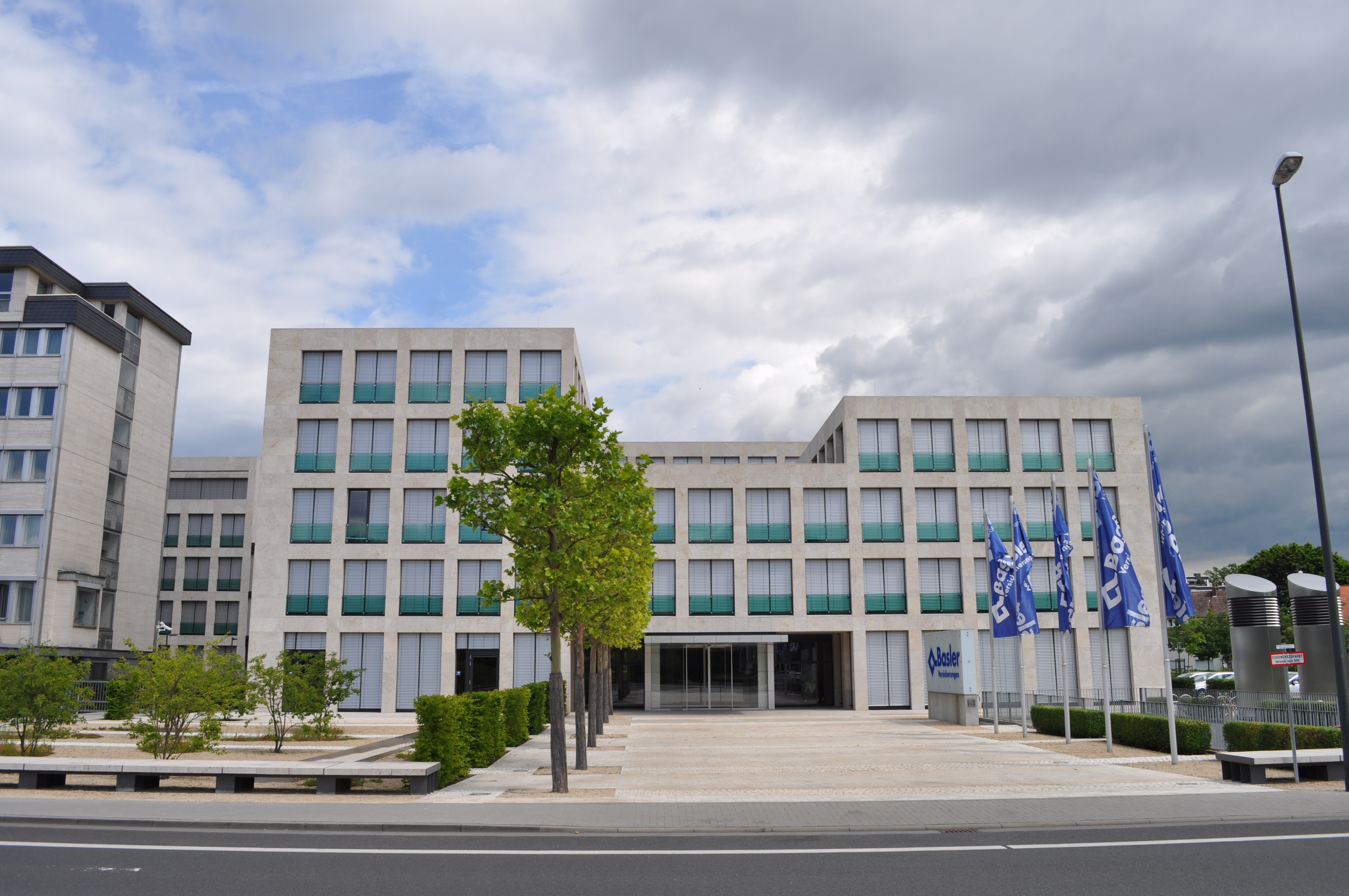
New buildings for the Basler Versicherungen in Bad Homburg, in 2012

In 1955, the architect Josef Bieling (1919–1981) founded the Architekturbüro Josef Bieling in his hometown Kassel. He focused on the planning and building of churches in the dioceses of Fulda, Paderborn and Hildesheim. He built 35 new churches, among other sacred buildings, and restored and remodeled several others. He also engaged in the building of senior citizens’ homes, kindergartens, parish halls, hospitals, schools, hotels and private homes. The new churches have included St. Bonifatius and St. Theresia, both in Kassel, Zu den heiligen Engeln in Hanover, and the pilgrimage church Maria Hilf in Trutzhain.

His sons, Kurt Bieling (born 1951) and Thomas Bieling (born 1956), also studied architecture, at the Technische Universität Braunschweig. From 2011, Thomas Bieling has been the only director of the firm now called Bieling Architekten.

The firm is known for large projects in several German cities, such as the restoration of the Unterneustadt in Kassel, and the new quarters Waidmarkt in Cologne's Oversburg, and Wallhöfe in Hamburg-Neustadt.

== Competitions ==
The office took part in several competitions for architecture and realization, and has received more than 100 awards at competitions, including:

- 2006: Quartiersentwicklung Neustadt / Wallhöfe in Hamburg
- 2007: Wohn- und Gewerbequartier Waidmarkt in Cologne
- 2008: Geschäftshaus Große Packhofstraße in Hanover
- 2009: Geschäftshaus an der Fürstenrieder Straße in Munich
- 2009: Erzbischöfliches Theologenkonvikt in Paderborn
- 2010: Hybrid Houses, model project of the exhibition IBA Hamburg

== Awards ==
Bieling Architkten has received several awards:

- 1994: Hessischer Denkmalschutzpreis: Ursulinenschule Fritzlar
- 2001: Deutscher Fassadenpreis ... (recognition): new building Ambulantes Herzzentrum Kassel
- 2002: Deutscher Fassadenpreis für vorgehängte hinterlüftete Fassaden: Crematory in Kassel
- 2002: Vorbildliche Bauten in Hessen: Home for several families (Mehrfamilienhaus) Barth in Kassel
- 2003: Prize of the Association of German Architects in Hesse (BDA Prize, Simon-Louis-du-Ry-Plakette: Entrance hall of the hospital Städtische Kliniken in Kassel, and an office building
- 2003: BDA Prize: offices and stores (Büro- und Geschäftshaus) at the Friedrichsplatz in Kassel
