= St. Bonifatius, Kassel =

St. Bonifatius
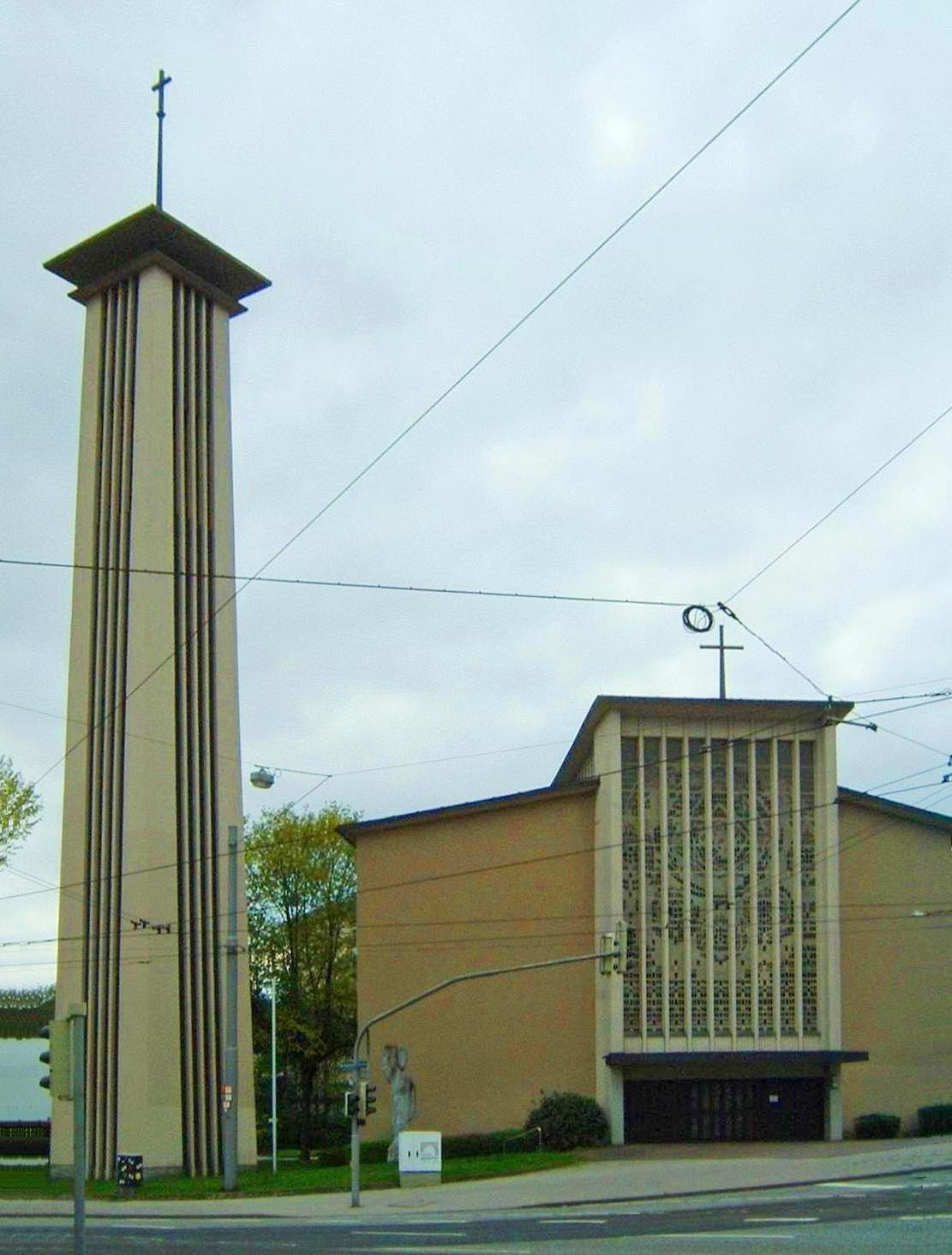
- Exterior of the church with the free steeple
- St. Bonifatius
- 51°19′28″N 9°30′45″E
- Location: Kassel, Germany
- Denomination: Catholic
- Website: www.st-bonifatius-kassel.de

History
- Dedication: Saint Boniface
- Consecrated: 1957

Architecture
- Architect: Josef Bieling

Administration
- Diocese: Fulda

St. Bonifatius is a Catholic church and parish in Kassel, Hesse, Germany. It was completed in 1956, designed by Josef Bieling. The parish is dedicated to Saint Boniface, and belongs to the Diocese of Fulda. It is now part of a merged parish St. Elisabeth.

== History and architecture ==
The parish is dedicated to Saint Boniface, also called the apostle of the Germans because of his missionary work in the 8th century. The parish St. Bonifatius in the Wesertor district of Kassel is large by area and members, serving the university, a hospital, three senior citizen's homes and several schools. The parish runs a Kindergarten. It is a Kirchort of the Pfarrverband St. Elisabeth.

The church was built in 1956 and 1957 on a design by the local architect Josef Bieling. It is a Saalkirche without columns. The floor plan is based on two entwined trapezoids, with a rounded altar area. It is constructed from beton, which is seen inside. The church features a high free-standing steeple, which was originally open. While the exterior is simply white, the interior is colourful. The crucifix was created in 1958 by Otto Sonnleitner from Würzburg. The mosaics are by Gerhard Dechant. The church was remodelled in 1968, especially the altar area in response to the Second Vatican Council. In 1973, the windows in the rear in pastel colours were replaced in stronger colours (Buntglas).

The church is widely visible. It got an entry in the Brockhaus Enzyklopädie, as the most striking building in Kassel from the time after World War II ("markantestes Kasseler Bauwerk der Nachkriegszeit"). It became a model for other churches.

== Literature ==
- G. Lange: Festschrift zur Einweihung der katholischen Kirche "St. Bonifatius" in Kassel. Weber & Weidemeyer, Kassel 1957.
