= Bonifas =

Bonifas may refer to:

== People ==
- Arthur Bonifas, one of two victims in a 1976 Korean axe murder incident
- Catherine Bonifas (1864–1948), Irish-born American philanthropist
- Paul Bonifas (1902–1975), French actor

== Other uses ==
- Camp Bonifas, a United Nations Command military post in South Korea named after Arthur Bonifas
- The Bonifas, original name of Aztec Challenge, a 1982 Atari video game
