= 1954 in architecture =

The year 1954 in architecture involved some significant events.

== Events ==
- June 29 – Buckminster Fuller patents his geodesic dome design, later expressed in his Dymaxion House
- November – Postwar United Kingdom government limitations on housebuilding are lifted

== Buildings and structures ==
=== Buildings opened ===
- April – Bevin Court public housing in the London borough of Finsbury, designed by Berthold Lubetkin with Francis Skinner and Douglas Carr
- Autumn – Inauguration of the city district of Vällingby, in Stockholm, Sweden, planned by Sven Markelius
- date unknown
  - Ciudad Universitaria (University City), UNAM's main campus in Mexico City, designed by Mario Pani and Enrique del Moral
  - Pruitt–Igoe housing project in St. Louis, Missouri, designed by Minoru Yamasaki, first occupied

=== Buildings completed ===
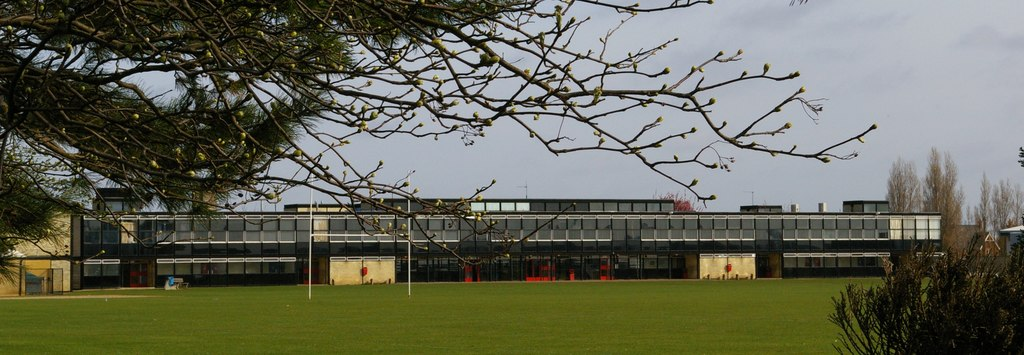
Hunstanton Secondary Modern School, England

- date unknown
  - Hunstanton Secondary Modern School, Hunstanton, Norfolk, England, designed by Peter and Alison Smithson, is completed
  - St Mary and St Joseph Roman Catholic Church on the Lansbury Estate in Poplar, East London, designed by Adrian Gilbert Scott, is completed
  - Goddard House, 22 Avenue Road, Stoneygate, Leicester, England, designed by Fello Atkinson and Brenda Walker of James Cubitt & Partners
  - Martin's (private house), Toys Hill, Brasted, Kent, England, designed by Powell and Moya, is completed

== Awards ==
- Prix de Rome, architecture – Michel Marot.
- Rome Prize Fellowship at American Academy in Rome – Robert Venturi.
- RIBA Royal Gold Medal – Arthur George Stephenson.

== Births ==
- February 22 – Jean-Philippe Vassal, French architect
- June 23 – Carme Pinós, Spanish architect
- October 12 – Keith Griffiths, Welsh-born architect
- January 6 – Hans Robert Hiegel, German architect
- date unknown – Kengo Kuma, Japanese architect
- date unknown – Salma Samar Damluji, Iraqi-British architect, professor and author

== Deaths ==
- February 25 – Auguste Perret, French architect, pioneer of reinforced concrete (born 1874)
- March 28 – Kaare Klint, Danish architect and furniture designer (born 1888)
- December 12 – Alker Tripp, English town planner (born 1883)
- date unknown – Salvador Valeri i Pupurull, Catalan architect (born 1873)
