= 1873 in architecture =

The year 1873 in architecture involved some significant architectural events and new buildings.

== Events ==
- May 1–October 31 – 1873 Vienna World's Fair (Weltausstellung 1873 Wien) is staged with the Rotunde as centrepiece. Architect for the exposition is Karl von Hasenauer, who is created Freiherr for his services; engineer for the Rotunda roof is John Scott Russell.

== Buildings and structures ==
=== Buildings opened ===
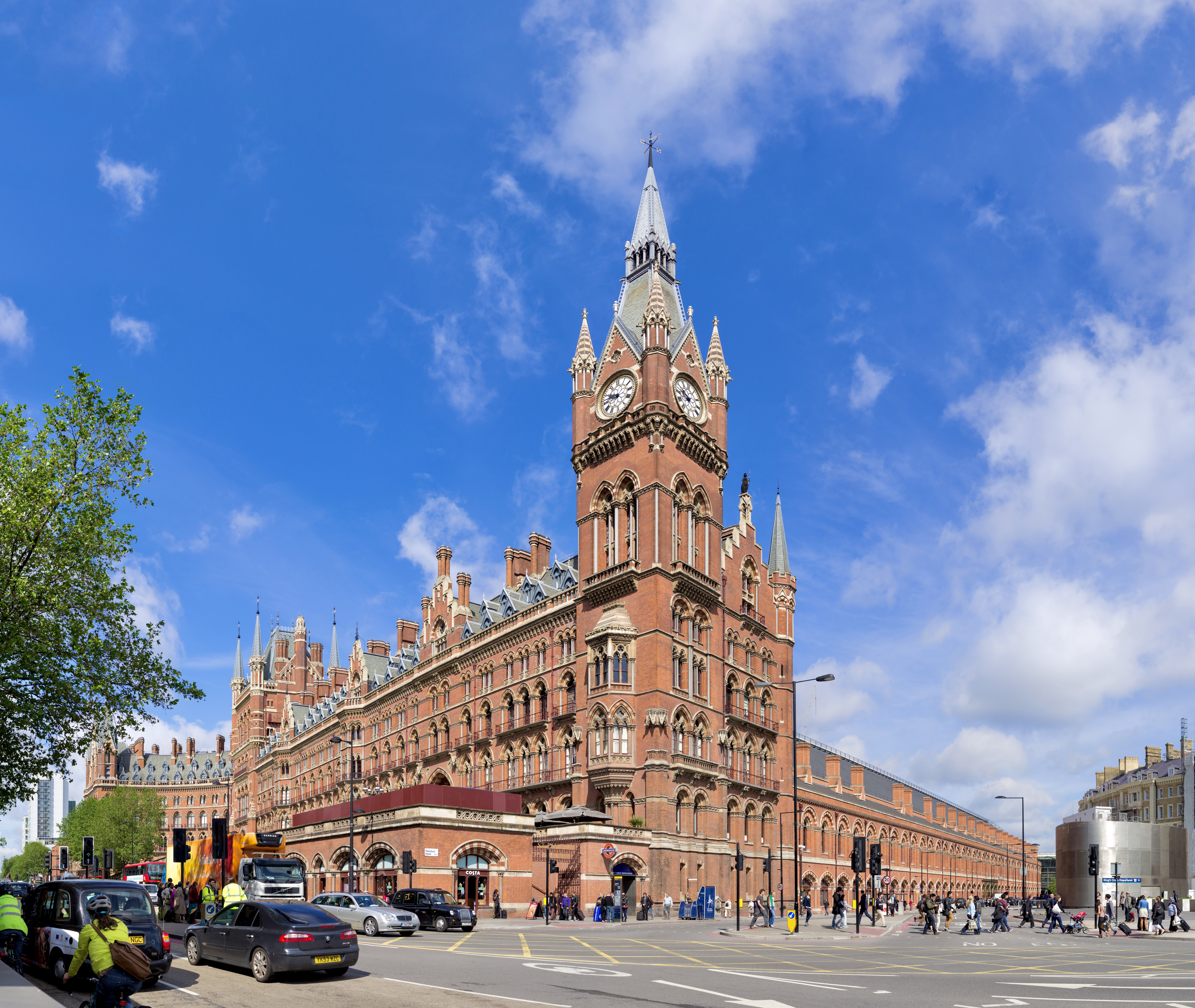
A high point of Victorian architecture: G. G. Scott’s Midland Grand Hotel fronting London St Pancras station

- May 5 – Midland Grand Hotel in London, England, is substantially completed and opened, the largest hotel in the world at this time.
- August 22 – Garrett Theatre, Póvoa de Varzim, Portugal.
- September 2 – The Berlin Victory Column in Berlin, Germany.
- September 29 – Christ Church Cathedral, Ottawa, Canada.

=== Buildings completed ===
- Ørskog Church, Norway, by Jacob Wilhelm Nordan.
- Rua Augusta Arch in Lisbon, built to commemorate the city's reconstruction after the 1755 earthquake.
- Trinity Church, Copley Square, Boston, Massachusetts, USA, designed by H. H. Richardson.
- Rood Building, Grand Rapids, Michigan.
- 549 Lordship Lane: the "Concrete House", East Dulwich, London.
- Buckley Arms hotel, Dinas Mawddwy, Wales, built in reinforced concrete.

== Awards ==
- RIBA Royal Gold Medal – Thomas Henry Wyatt
- Grand Prix de Rome, architecture: Marcel Lambert

== Births ==
- February 2 – Oskar Kaufmann, Hungarian-Jewish architect (died 1956)
- August 20 – Eliel Saarinen, Finnish art deco architect (died 1950)
- November 10 – David Lynn, US architect, Architect of the Capitol 1923–1954 (died 1961)
- date unknown – Salvador Valeri i Pupurull, Catalan architect (died 1954)

== Deaths ==
- May 2 – Samuel Sanders Teulon, English Gothic Revival architect (born 1812)
- date unknown – Sampson Kempthorne, English architect and workhouse designer also practising in New Zealand (born 1809)
