= 1891 in architecture =

The year 1891 in architecture involved some significant architectural events and new buildings.

== Buildings and structures ==
=== Buildings ===
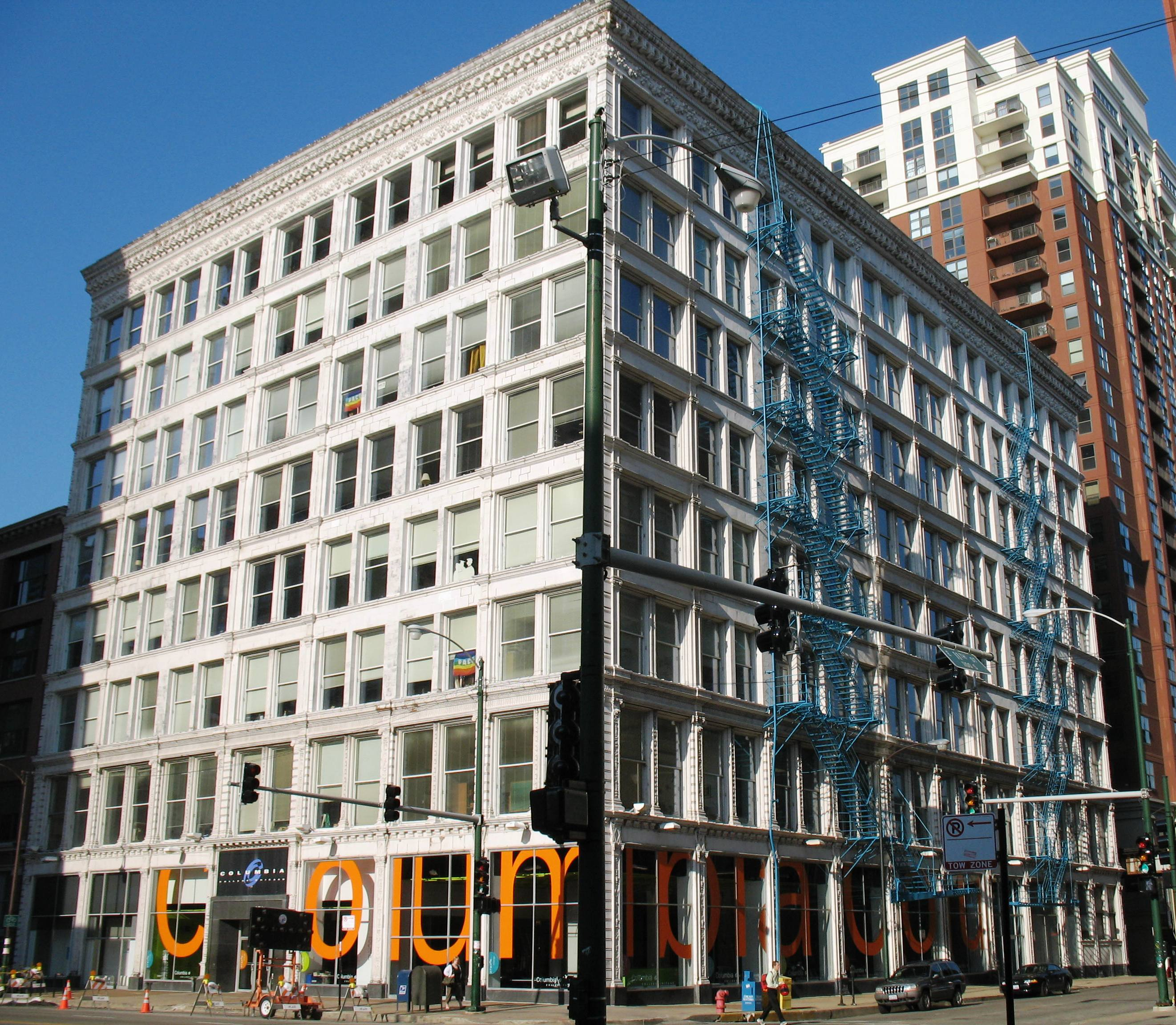
Ludington Building – Chicago

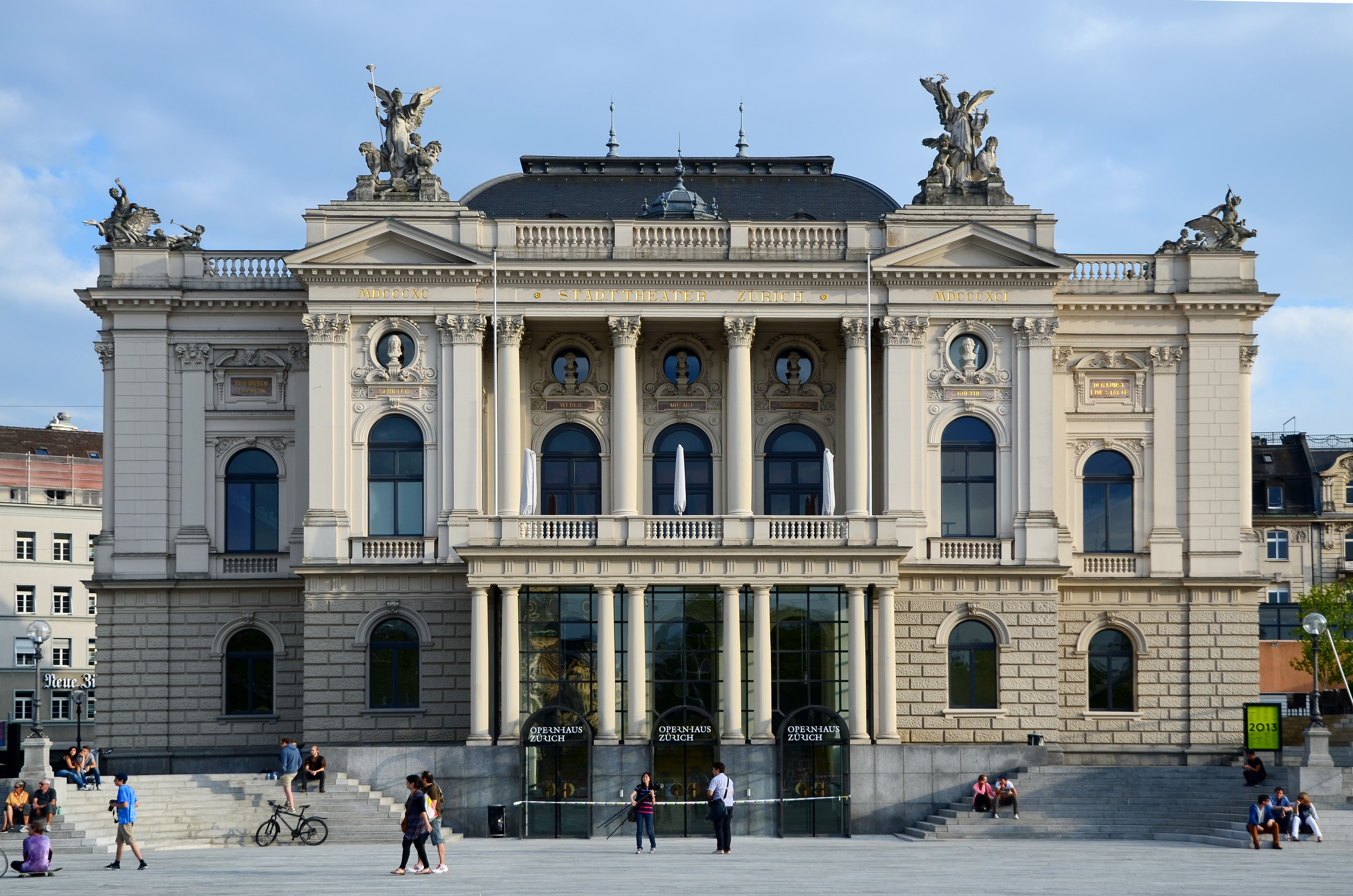
Stadttheater Zürich, Switzerland

- October 7 — Uris Library at Cornell University, designed by William Henry Miller, opens
- Ludington Building – Chicago, designed by William Le Baron Jenney, earliest surviving steel-framed building in the city, and the earliest entirely terracotta-clad skyscraper (8 storeys).
- Manhattan Building – Chicago, designed by William Le Baron Jenney, completed; world's earliest surviving steel-framed building to use a purely skeletal supporting structure.
- Second Leiter Building – Chicago, designed by William Le Baron Jenney.
- Monadnock Building – Chicago, tallest masonry load-bearing wall building when built.
- Sacred Heart Cathedral – Davenport, Iowa, designed by James J. Egan.
- St. Ambrose Cathedral – Des Moines, Iowa, designed by James J. Egan.
- San Sebastian Church (Manila).
- Wainwright Building – St. Louis, Missouri, designed by Dankmar Adler and Louis Sullivan.
- University of Pennsylvania Library – Philadelphia, Pennsylvania, designed by Frank Furness.
- Several buildings constructed for the General Land Centennial Exhibition world fair – Prague, including the Art Nouveau Průmyslový Palace.
- Victoria Hall (Geneva), Switzerland, a concert hall designed by Marc Camoletti.
- Stadttheater Zürich, designed by Fellner & Helmer, opened.
- House of the Estates in Helsinki, Finland, built.
- General Post Office, Birmingham, England, designed by Henry Tanner.
- Palace Theatre, Manchester, England, designed by Alfred Darbyshire.
- Château de l'Île (Schloss Inselburg), Ostwald, Bas-Rhin, France (then Germany).

== Awards ==
- RIBA Royal Gold Medal – Arthur Blomfield.
- Grand Prix de Rome, architecture: Henri Eustache.

== Births ==
- January 2 – Giovanni Michelucci, Italian architect, urban planner and engraver (died 1990)
- August 2 – Joseph Charles Fowell, Australian architect (died 1970)
- date unknown – Kanippayyur Shankaran Namboodiripad, Nambudiri Brahmin and Royal Architect (died 1981)
- date unknown – Giuseppe Psaila, Maltese Art Nouveau architect (died 1960)

== Deaths ==
- January 11 – Baron Haussmann, French civic planner notable for the rebuilding of Paris in the 1860s (born 1809)
- January 15 – John Wellborn Root, Chicago architect (born 1850; pneumonia)
- January 22 – Miklós Ybl, Hungarian architect (born 1814)
- January 23 – Friedrich von Schmidt, Austrian architect working in Vienna (born 1825)
- March 19 – Jānis Frīdrihs Baumanis, Latvian architect (born 1834)
- April 7 – J. D. Sedding, English ecclesiastical architect (born 1838)
- May 7 – John Hayward, English Gothic Revival architect (born 1807)
