= Hiegel =

Hiegel is a surname. Notable people with the surname include:

- Catherine Hiegel (born 1946), French actress
- Hans Robert Hiegel (born 1954), German architect
