= 1956 in architecture =

The year 1956 in architecture involved some significant events.

== Buildings and structures ==
=== Buildings opened ===
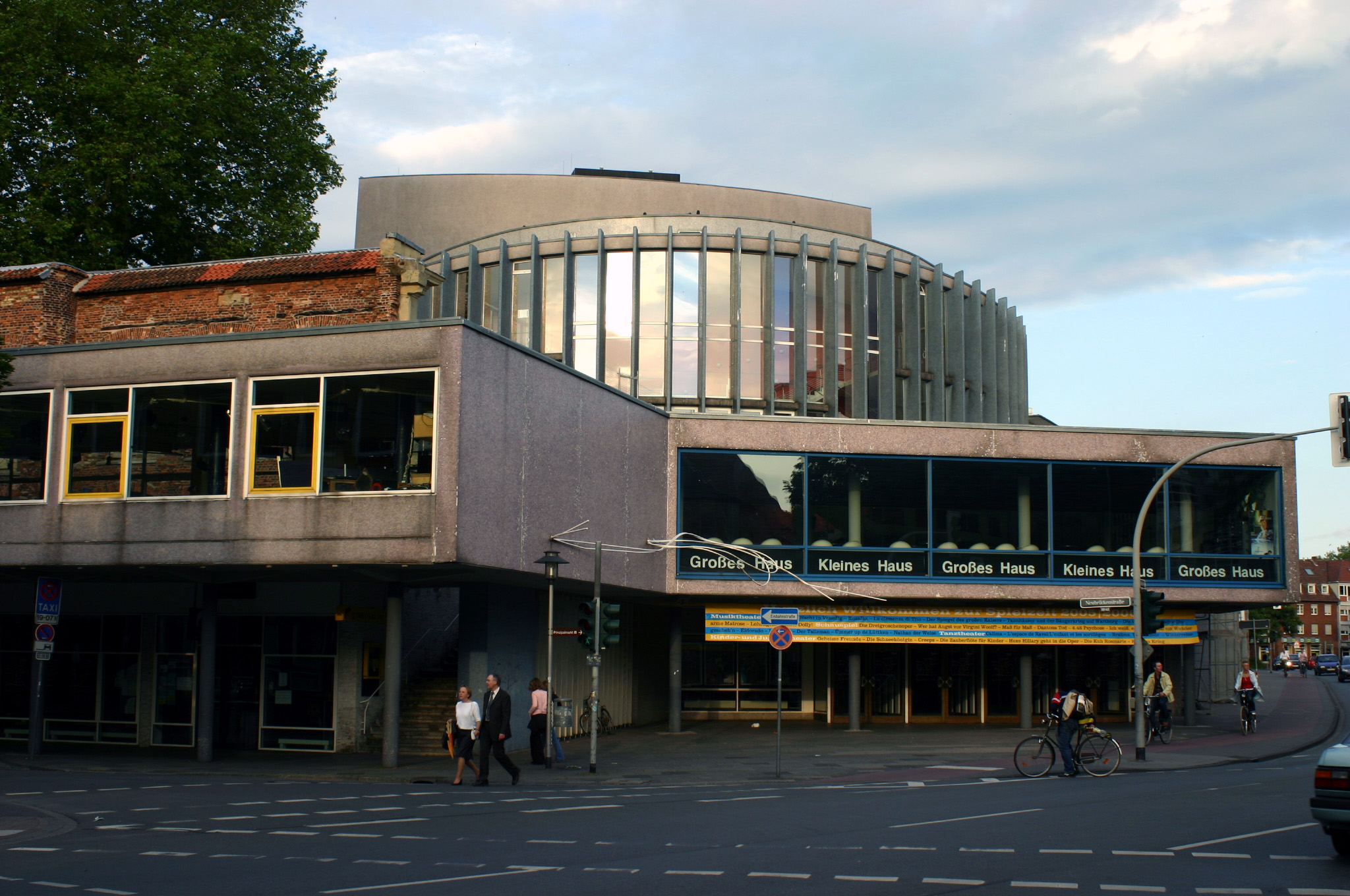
Theater Münster, Germany

- February – Price Tower, Bartlesville, Oklahoma, United States designed by Frank Lloyd Wright.
- February 4 – Theater Münster in Germany, designed by Werner Ruhnau, Harald Deilmann, Max von Hausen and Ortwin Rave.
- April 17 – Council House, Bristol, England, UK, designed by Vincent Harris (begun 1938).
- April 30 – Torre Latinoamericana in Mexico City, Mexico, designed by Augusto H. Alvarez.
- July 31 – Luzhniki Stadium in Moscow, Russia, USSR.

=== Buildings completed ===
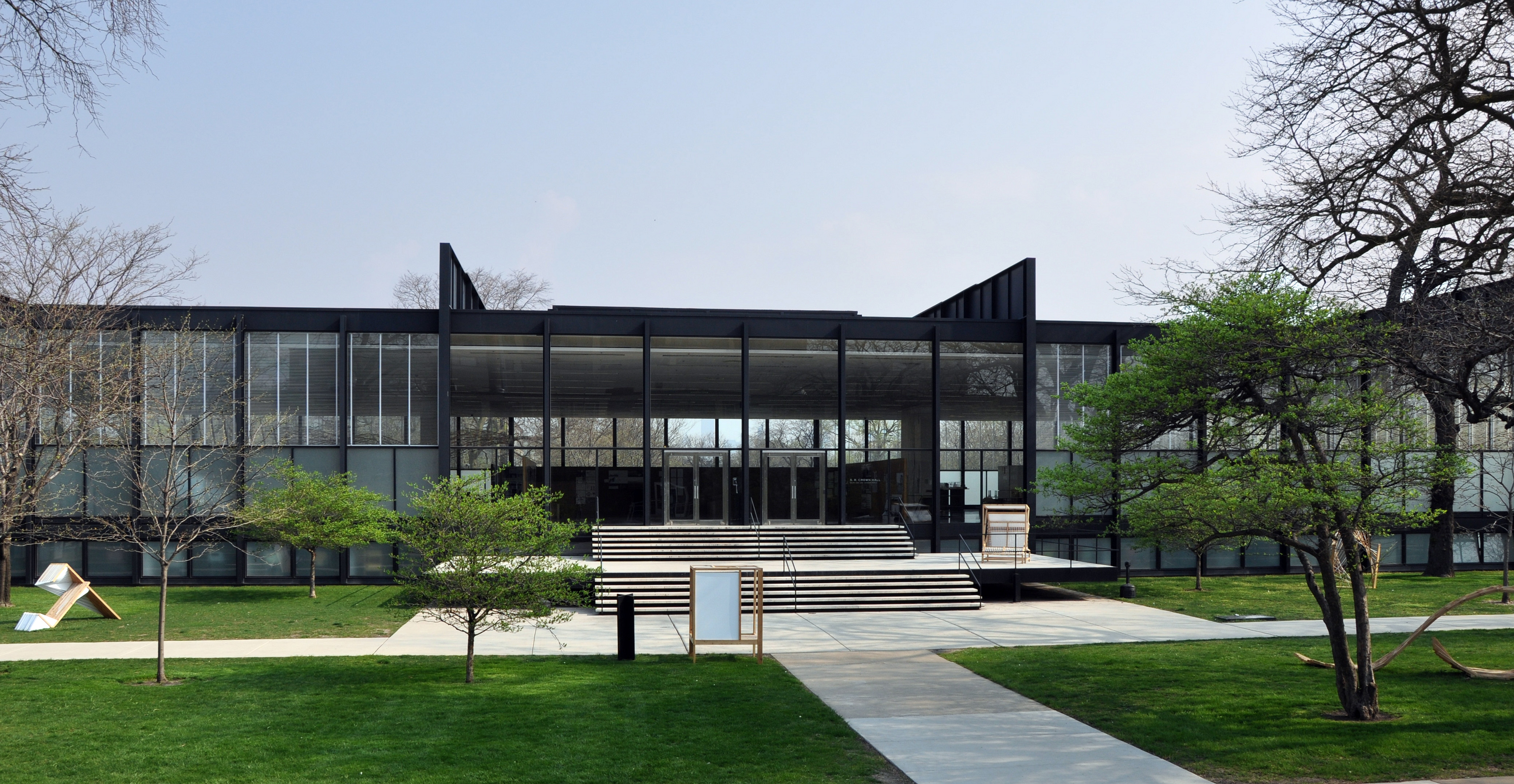
S. R. Crown Hall at the Illinois Institute of Technology, Chicago, USA

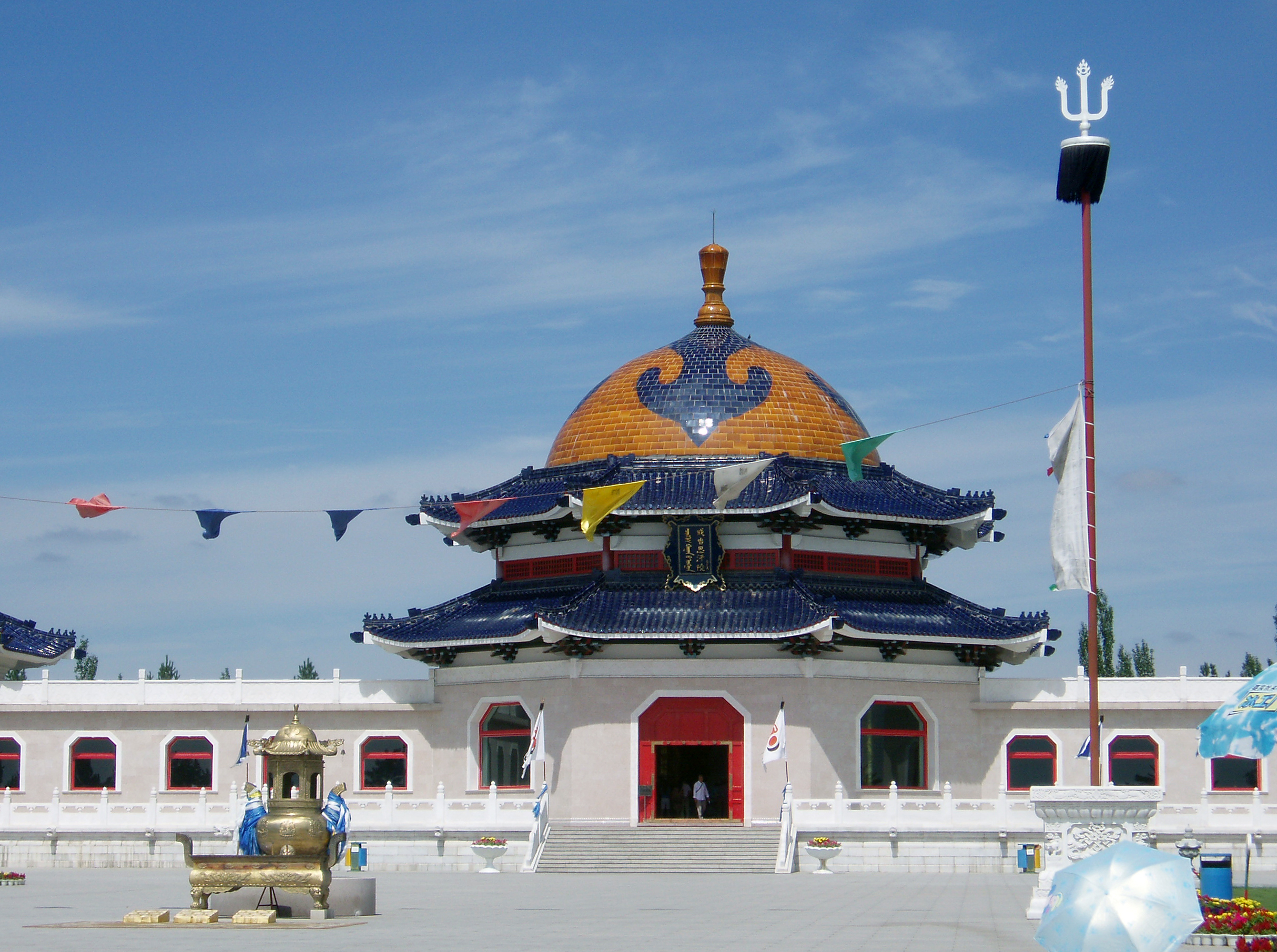
Mausoleum of Genghis Khan in Inner Mongolia, China

- Capitol Records Building in Hollywood, California, the world's first round office building, designed by architect Welton Becket.
- S. R. Crown Hall at the Illinois Institute of Technology, Chicago, United States, designed by the current head of IIT's architecture department Mies van der Rohe.
- General Motors Technical Center in Warren, Michigan, United States, designed by Eero Saarinen.
- Latvian Academy of Sciences, Riga, Latvia, designed by Lev Rudnev.
- Maisons Jaoul in the Paris suburb of Neuilly-sur-Seine, designed by Le Corbusier in 1937.
- Mausoleum of Genghis Khan completed as a cenotaph in Inner Mongolia, People's Republic of China.
- Vidhana Soudha, completed in Bangalore, India, designed by Kengal Hanumanthaiah.
- Bank of England Printing Works at Loughton, designed by Howard Robertson.
- National Pensions Institute, Helsinki, Finland, designed by Alvar Aalto.
- Rødovre Town Hall, Denmark, designed by Arne Jacobsen.
- St Mark's Church (Markuskyrkan), Björkhagen, Stockholm, Sweden, designed by Sigurd Lewerentz.
- Faculty of Letters building at the University of Reading, England, UK, designed by Howard Robertson.
- Rothschild estate cottages, Poplar Meadow, Rushbrooke, Suffolk, England, UK, designed by John Weeks.
- H. J. Lovink Pumping Station on the Flevopolder in the Netherlands, designed by Dirk Roosenburg.

== Awards ==
- AIA Gold Medal – Clarence S. Stein.
- Grand Prix de Rome, architecture – Michel Folliasson.
- RIBA Royal Gold Medal – Walter Gropius.

== Births ==
- January 15 – Vitaly Kaloyev, Russian architect and politician
- October 29 – Kazuyo Sejima, Japanese architect
- November 25 – Stefano Boeri, Italian architect and urban planner
- November – Teresa Borsuk, British architect

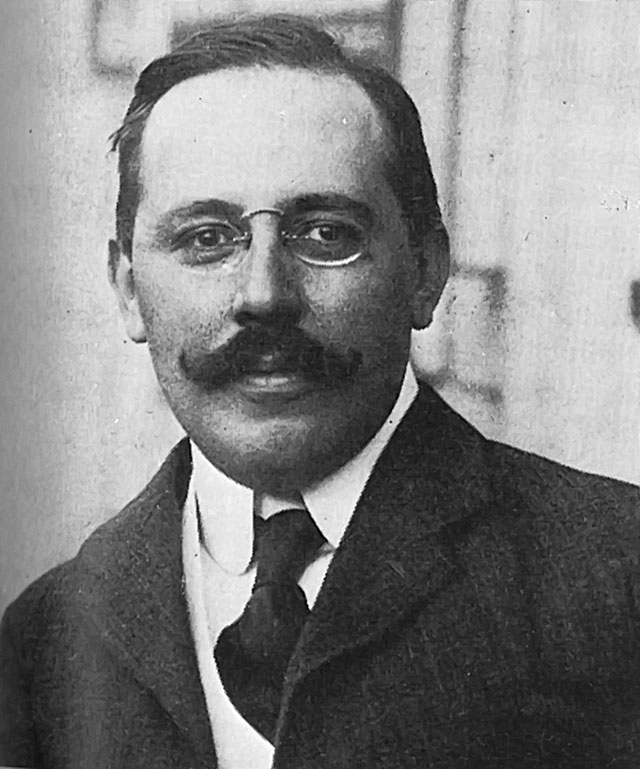
Josef Hoffmann

== Deaths ==
- February 25 – Philip Tilden, English domestic architect (born 1887)
- May 7 – Josef Hoffmann, Austrian architect and designer (born 1870)
- July 21 – Lionel Bailey Budden, English architect and academic (born 1877)
- September 8 – Oskar Kaufmann, Hungarian-Jewish architect known for his works in Berlin (born 1873)
- November 20 – Joseph Emberton, English modernist architect (born 1889)
- December 21 – Josep Puig i Cadafalch, Catalan Spanish Modernista architect known for his works in Barcelona (born 1867)
