= Portsmouth Public Library =

Portsmouth Public Library may refer to:

- Portsmouth Public Library (Ohio), United States
- Portsmouth Public Library (New Hampshire), United States
