= Hôtel de Ville, Illkirch-Graffenstaden =

Town hall in Illkirch-Graffenstaden, France

Hôtel de Ville
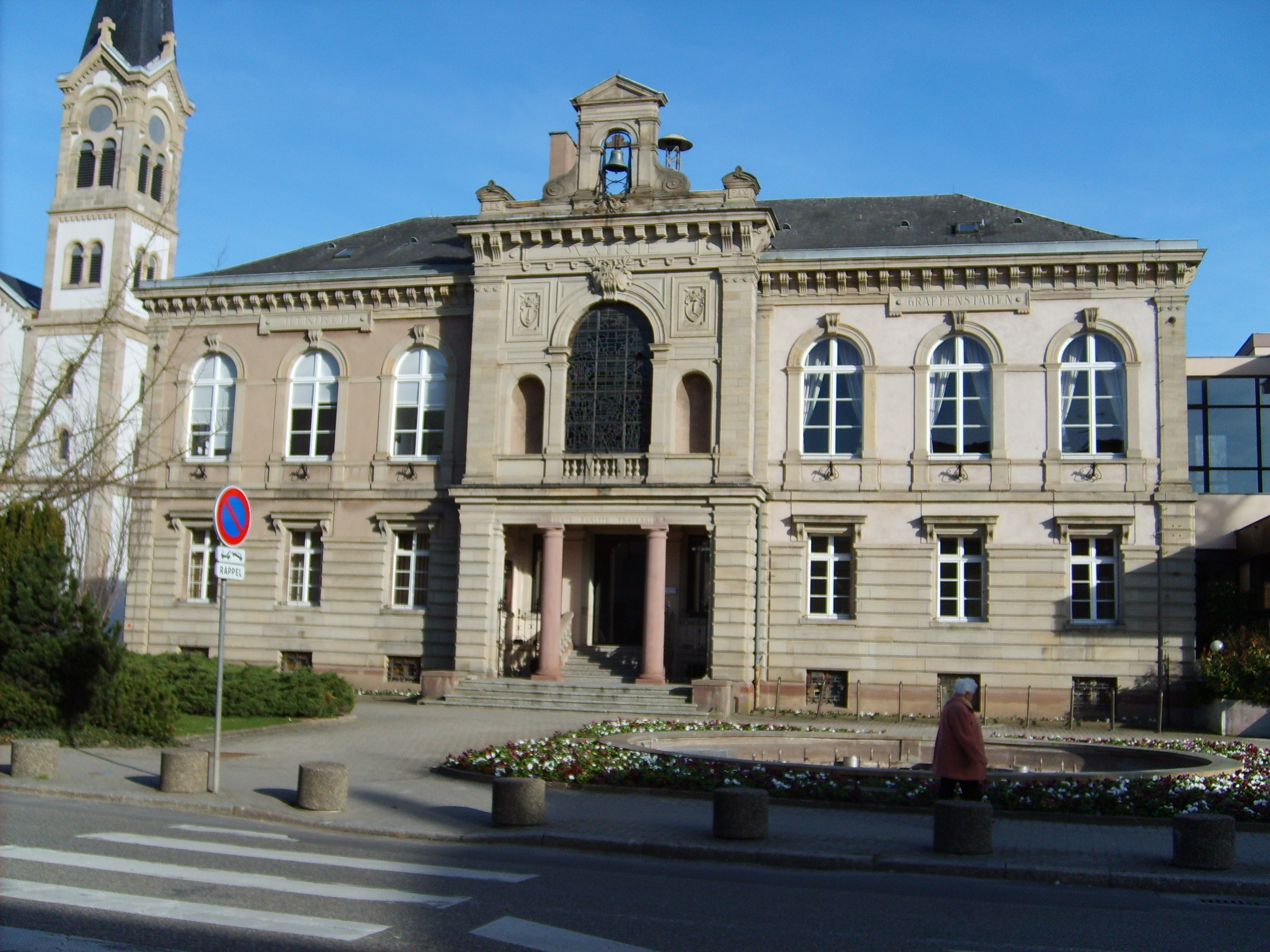
- The main frontage of the Hôtel de Ville in March 2007
- Interactive map of the Hôtel de Ville area

General information
- Type: City hall
- Architectural style: Neoclassical style
- Location: Illkirch-Graffenstaden, France
- Coordinates: 48.5287°N 7.7110°E
- Completed: 1882

Design and construction
- Architect: Jacques Albert Brion

The Hôtel de Ville (French pronunciation: [otɛl də vil], City Hall) is a municipal building in Illkirch-Graffenstaden, Bas-Rhin, in northeastern France, standing on Route de Lyon.

== History ==
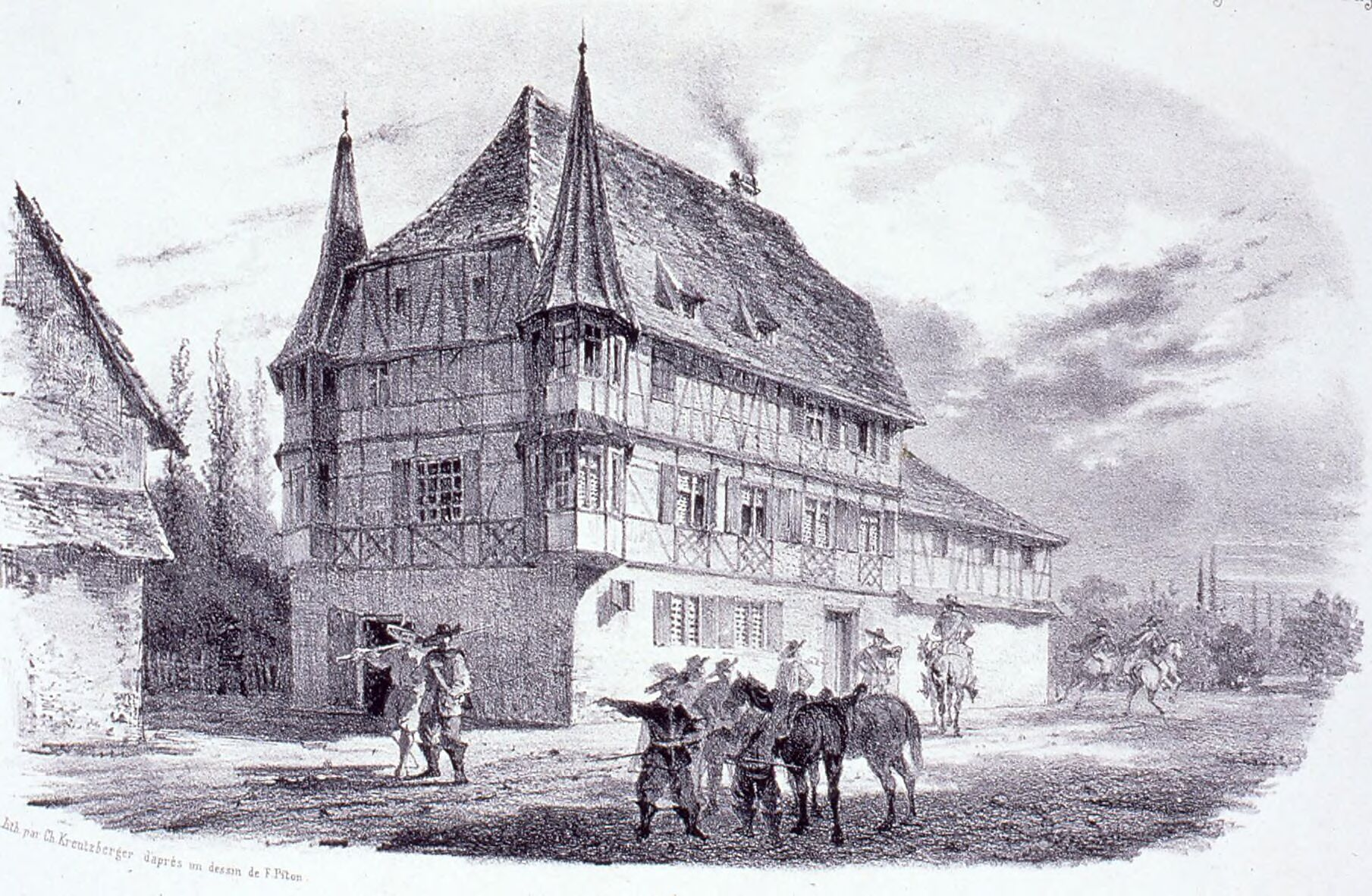
The Maison de la Capitulation

The first municipal building in the town was the Maison de la Capitulation on the east side of Route de Lyon near the junction with what is now Rue Vincent Scotto. It was designed in the medieval style using half-timbering and was completed in around 1600. The design involved a three-storey main frontage facing onto the street with bartizans at the north end. The building was the place where the Secretary of State for War, François-Michel le Tellier, Marquis de Louvois, signed the deed of capitulation annexing the city of Strasbourg by France on 30 September 1681. After it was no longer required for municipal purposes, the building was sold to the Scheidecker family. (Note: Scheidecker, de Régel & Co. was a major manufacturer of fabrics established by Jean Georges Scheidecker in Lutzelhausen in the mid-19th century.) It eventually became dilapidated and was demolished.

In the mid-19th century, after operating out of temporary premises, the council decided to commission a purpose-built town hall. The site they selected was further to the south along Route de Lyon. The new building was designed by Jacques Albert Brion in the neoclassical style, built in ashlar stone and was officially opened by the mayor, Johann Schertzer, in 1882.

The design involved a symmetrical main frontage of seven bays facing onto the street. The central bay, which was slightly projected forward, featured a recessed porch area, formed by a pair of Doric order columns supporting an entablature, on the ground floor. There was a round headed window with a moulded surround and a keystone, flanked by a pair of niches, on the first floor, and there was a bellcote above. The wings were fenestrated by casement windows with cornices on the ground floor and by round headed windows with moulded surrounds and keystones on the first floor. Internally, the principal room was the Salle des Mariages (wedding room).

The building was extended to the south in the 1970s but work to restructure that extension, to a design by the architectural firm Renato Filippini, began in 2012. The work, which cost €6.8 million, included the creation of a new reception hall, in the shape of a perforated stainless-steel shell, immediately in front of the original extension. The complex was officially reopened by the mayor, Jacques Bigot, on 13 June 2014.
