= Illkirch-Graffenstaden =

Illkirch-Graffenstaden Ìllkìrich-Gràffestàde (Alsatian) Illkirch-Grafenstaden (German)
- Commune
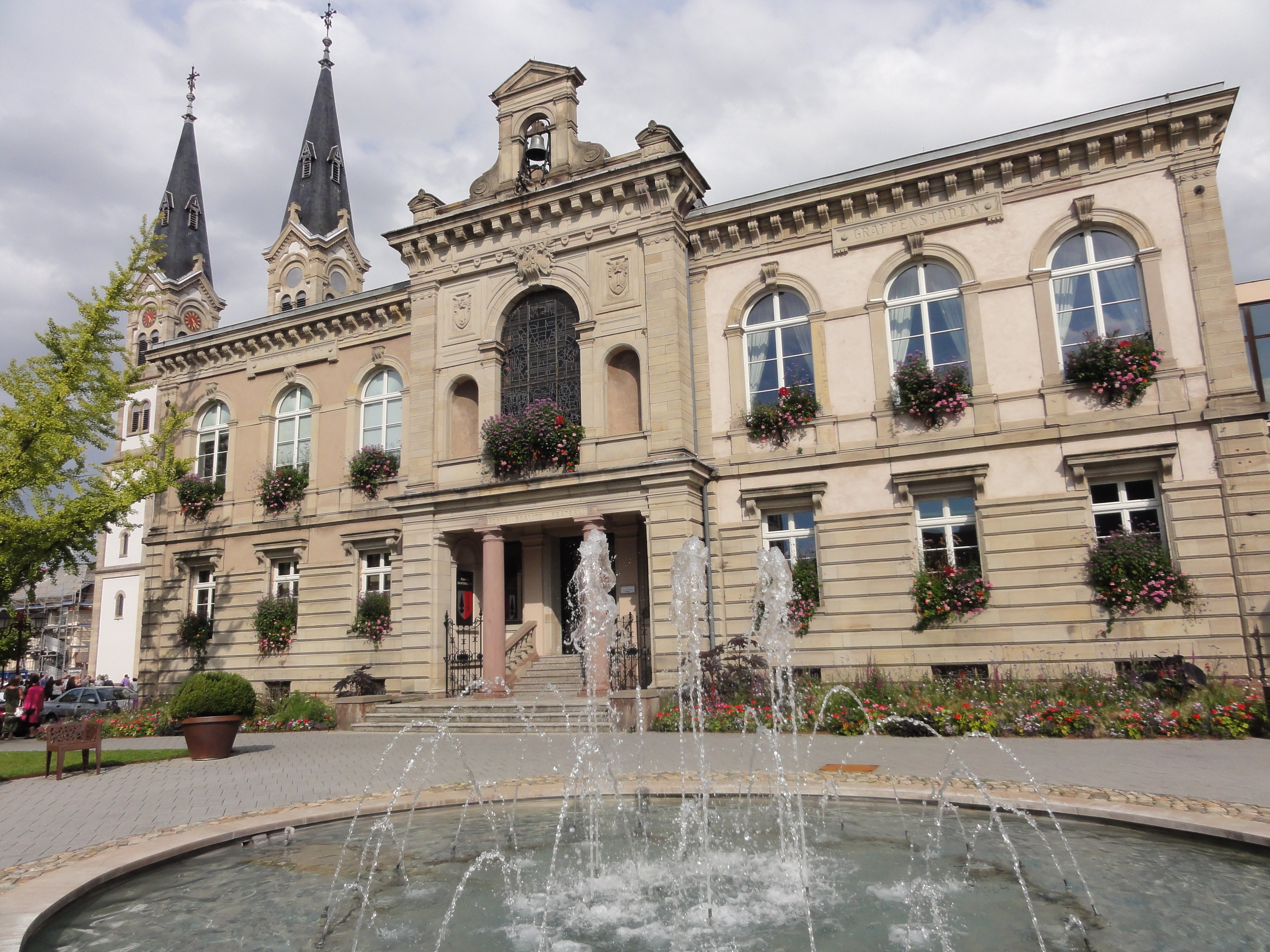
- The Hôtel de Ville

- Coat of arms
- Location of Illkirch-Graffenstaden
- Location within France Location within Grand Est
- Coordinates: 48°32′N 7°43′E
- Country: France
- Region: Grand Est
- Department: Bas-Rhin
- Arrondissement: Strasbourg
- Canton: Illkirch-Graffenstaden
- Intercommunality: Strasbourg Eurométropole

Government
  - Mayor (2020–2026): Thibaud Philipps (LR)
- Area^{1}: 22.21 km^{2} (8.58 sq mi)
- Elevation: 140 m (460 ft)
- Highest elevation: 146 m (479 ft)
- Lowest elevation: 139 m (456 ft)
- Population (2023): 27,872
  - Density: 1,255/km^{2} (3,250/sq mi)
- Time zone: UTC+01:00 (CET)
  - Summer (DST): UTC+02:00 (CEST)
- INSEE/Postal code: 67218 /67400
- ^{1} French Land Register data, which excludes lakes, ponds, glaciers > 1 km^{2} (0.386 sq mi or 247 acres) and river estuaries.

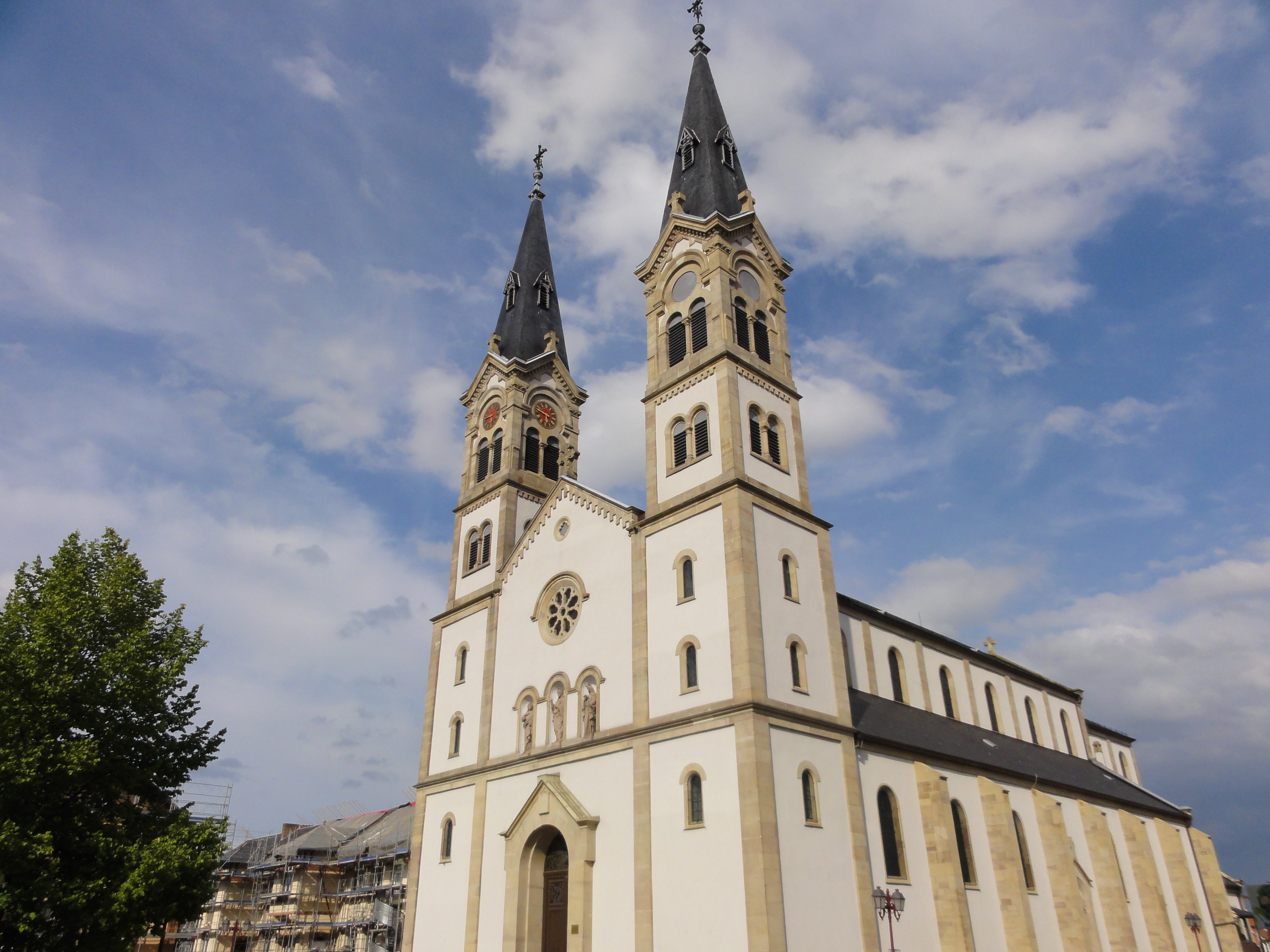
Church of St Symphorian

Illkirch-Graffenstaden (French pronunciation: [ilkiʁʃ gʁafənʃtadən]) is a commune in the Bas-Rhin department in Grand Est in north-eastern France. It is the second-largest suburb of the city of Strasbourg, and is adjacent to it on the south-southwest. Illkirch-Graffenstaden's population more than doubled in 55 years (from 11,648 in 1968 to 27,872 in 2023).

== Name ==
During periods when Alsace-Lorraine was part of Germany (1871–1918, 1940–1945) the commune was known by its German name, Illkirch-Grafenstaden, with a single 'f' in place of the French 'ff'. Among French speakers from outside Alsace the commune is sometimes known colloquially as the shorter 'Illkirch'.

== Demographics ==
Illkirch-Graffenstaden is the third most populous commune in the urban community of Strasbourg, the fourth largest in the département and the sixth largest taking together the two departments comprising Alsace.

Historical population

Year	Pop.	±% p.a.
1793	1,520	—
1800	1,621	+0.92%
1806	1,667	+0.47%
1821	1,907	+0.90%
1831	1,766	−0.77%
1836	2,293	+5.36%
1841	2,545	+2.11%
1846	3,187	+4.60%
1851	3,208	+0.13%
1856	4,209	+5.58%
1861	4,437	+1.06%
1866	4,668	+1.02%
1871	4,755	+0.37%
1875	4,739	−0.08%
1880	4,733	−0.03%
1885	5,017	+1.17%
1890	5,228	+0.83%
1895	5,549	+1.20%
1900	6,111	+1.95%

Year	Pop.	±% p.a.
1905	6,313	+0.65%
1910	6,522	+0.65%
1921	6,450	−0.10%
1926	6,979	+1.59%
1931	7,739	+2.09%
1936	7,936	+0.50%
1946	7,774	−0.21%
1954	7,942	+0.27%
1962	9,607	+2.41%
1968	11,648	+3.26%
1975	16,330	+4.95%
1982	19,857	+2.83%
1990	22,307	+1.46%
1999	23,815	+0.73%
2007	26,829	+1.50%
2012	26,379	−0.34%
2017	26,780	+0.30%
2023	27,872	+0.67%

Source: EHESS and INSEE (1968-2023)

== Geography ==
The larger adjacent communes, like Illkirch-Graffenstaden, are effectively outer suburbs of the Strasbourg conurbation. These include Strasbourg-Meinau, Ostwald and Geispolsheim. Illkirch-Graffenstaden is crossed by the river Ill which here runs from south to north, parallel with and roughly ten kilometres to the west of the river Rhine: the two finally converge a short distance to the north of Strasbourg. The town also lies by the Rhône-Rhine Canal which here runs between the two rivers. Graffenstaden station has rail connections to Strasbourg and Colmar.

Extensive quarrying has been undertaken in the area for many years, giving rise to a number of small lakes in the region, a couple of which have been adapted for recreational swimming.

The International Space University is located on the part of the University of Strasbourg campus lying in the territory of Illkirch-Graffenstaden.

== History ==
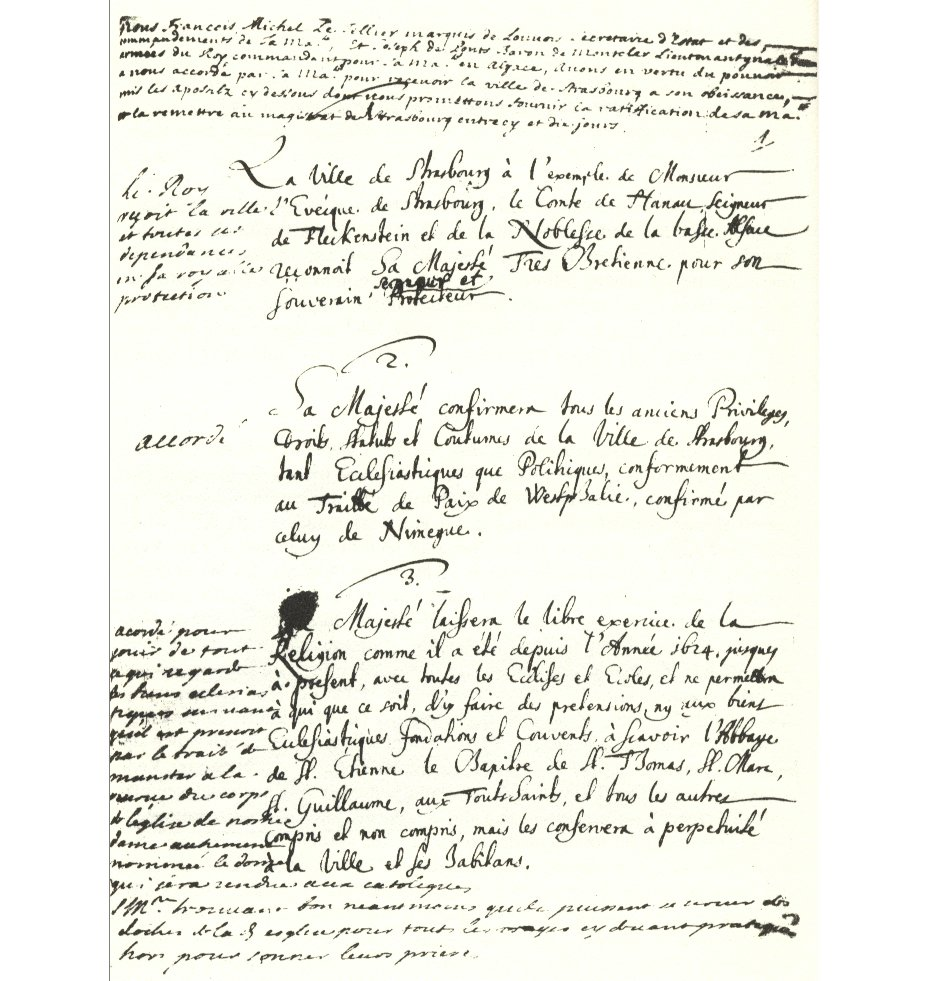
The first page of the Illkirch capitulation document (Kapitulationsurkunde).

Illkirch is believed to be a Frankish foundation. The town, like Alsace, takes the first syllable of its name from the river that crosses it: the second syllable is simply the German word for a church. The spelling of the name has changed as language developed: Ellofanum (720 AD; see fanum), Illechilechen (826), Illenkirche (845), Illekiriche (920), Illachirecha (1163) and Illenkirchen (1172) which mutated into the contemporary name, Illkirch.

When Rudolf of Habsburg was elected King of the Romans in 1273, he urgently needed military help from his leading supporters against his rival, Ottokar II of Bohemia, who was reluctant to accept Rudolf as emperor. As a reward for their services, Rudolf in 1284 elevated several leading Strasbourgers to the knighthood. To his favoured supporter, Bernhard von Müllenheim, he also granted the ford at Grafenstaden, with the right to levy tolls on travelers: the value of the concession was enhanced by the absence of any bridge. Hitherto the citizens of Strasbourg had been able to use the Grafenstaden ford without payment, and in 1391 ownership of the ford reverted to the city: from that year, there was a requirement weekly to transfer money collected from tolls to Strasbourg.

Historians know of Illkirch from the Illkirch capitulation document. In 1681, facing the prospect of imminent French invasion, Hans Georg von Zedlitz, mayor of Strasbourg, tried to obtain imperial support to turn back the advancing French army from Strasbourg, which enjoyed privileged status as a free imperial city. Imperial support did not materialize, however, and von Zedlitz was finally obliged to surrender on 30 September 1681.

Graffenstaden was a village bordering Illkirch: the two communes were merged for economic reasons between 1790 and 1794.

The Hôtel de Ville was completed in 1882.

== Economy ==
After the First World War the largest employer was the Société Alsacienne de Constructions Mécaniques (SACM), a heavy engineering business that specialised in the manufacture of railway locomotives and machine tools. The factory had originally been built before the annexation of Alsace by Germany, but had been operated separately as a German business between 1871 and 1918.

Although heavy engineering still plays a part in the local economy, the second half of the twentieth century saw a massive decline in the sector and much of the old industrial site is today covered by a large shopping centre, offices and even residential developments. Today it is the tertiary sector that provides most of the employment in the area. Another important employer is Leclerc barracks (Quartier Leclerc), home to the French 2nd Armoured Brigade and the German 291st Light Infantry Battalion, a unit of the Franco-German Brigade.

== People ==
=== Science and industry ===
- Jean-Baptiste Schwilgué, horologist

=== Sports ===
- Mehdi Baala, track and field athlete

=== Culinary ===
- Jean-Georges Vongerichten, chef

== See also ==
- Château Klinglin
- Communes of the Bas-Rhin department
