= 1809 in architecture =

The year 1809 in architecture involved some significant architectural events and new buildings.

== Events ==
- September – Demolition of most of the Anglo-Saxon St Mary's Church, Reculver, on the coast of south-east England, begins.

== Buildings and structures ==
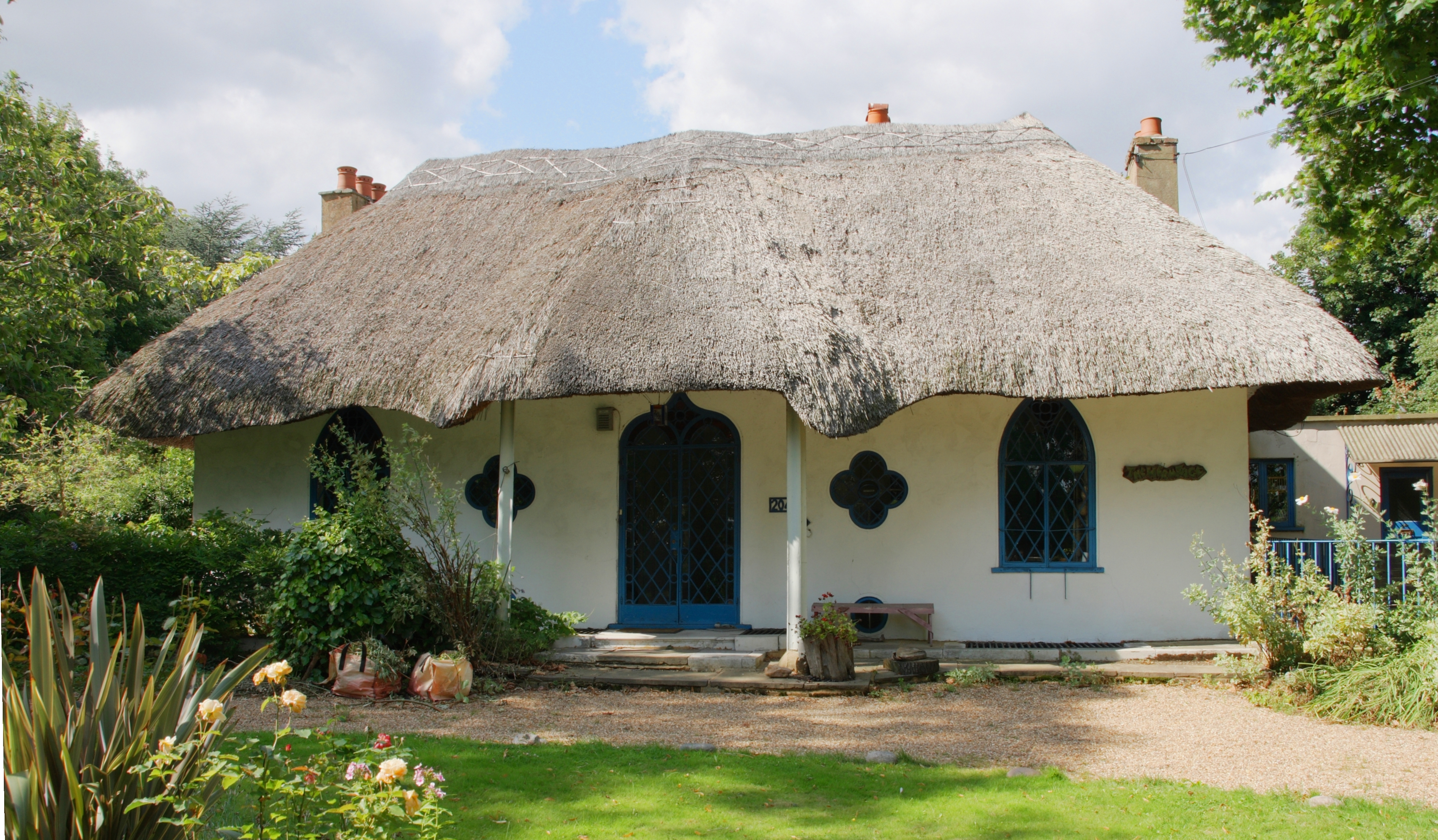
The Hermitage, Hanwell, London - cottage orné of 1809

- Gordon House, Chelsea, London, England, designed by Thomas Leverton for Colonel James Willoughby Gordon.
- Nelson's Column, Montreal, Canada, designed and built by Coade & Sealy of London.
- Nelson's Pillar, Dublin, Ireland, design by William Wilkins amended by Francis Johnston, opened.
- Armagh Courthouse, Ireland, designed by William Wilkins, completed.
- Portsmouth Academy building, Portsmouth, New Hampshire, United States, designed by James Nutter.
- Second Theatre Royal, Covent Garden, London, designed by Robert Smirke, opened.
- Dunkeld Bridge, Scotland, designed by Thomas Telford, completed.

== Awards ==
- Grand Prix de Rome, architecture: André Chatillon.

== Births ==
- February 15 – Owen Jones, Welsh architect and designer (died 1874)
- March 29 – Georges-Eugène Haussmann, French town planner (died 1891)
- October 31 – Edmund Sharpe, English architect and architectural historian (died 1877)
- November 26 – Thomas Talbot Bury, English architect and lithographer (died 1877)

== Deaths ==
- November 4 – Gabriel Manigault, American architect (born 1758)
