= Portsmouth Public Library (New Hampshire) =

Public library of Portsmouth, New Hampshire

Coordinates: 43°04′26″N 70°45′28″W

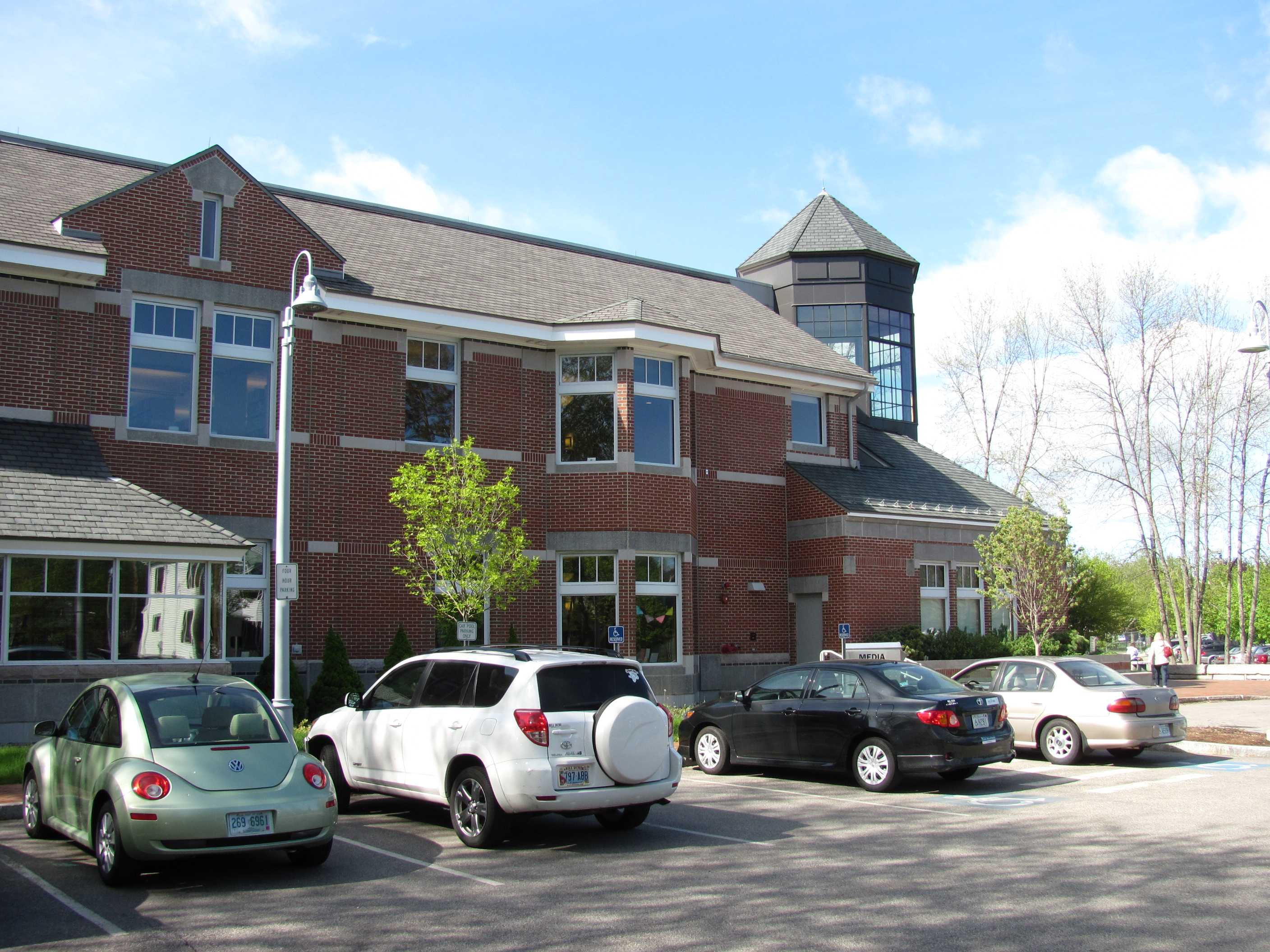
- Portsmouth Public Library
- Location: 175 Parrott Avenue, Portsmouth, NH
- Established: 1896

Collection
- Size: 128,000+

Access and use
- Circulation: ~375,000
- Population served: ~20,600
- Members: ~14,000

Other information
- Director: Steve Butzel
- Website: www.cityofportsmouth.com/library

Portsmouth Public Library is the public library of Portsmouth, New Hampshire. Established in 1896, the library's mission is to provide popular media materials to the public as well as to supply information and access to reference works. It also does community outreach, attempting to provide services and material to foster an appreciation for reading and learning in youth as well as offering activities engineered to appeal to older demographics. It is located at 175 Parrott Avenue.

== Services ==
The library is open 7 days a week, from 10–8 Monday through Thursday, 10-5 Friday and Saturday, and 1–5 on Sunday (the library is not open on Sunday during the summer months). It hosts computer stations with a variety of applications and library databases, as well as internet access. The building and its immediate grounds provide wireless access as well. It also provides printing and copying services.

The library makes available special passes for free or reduced-price admission to a variety of regional resources such as Museums and Art Galleries.

The library, which is handicapped-accessible, contains three larger meeting rooms available to the public as well as three smaller study/conference rooms on the premises. It has seating areas scattered throughout. The library includes a café.

== Facilities ==
When the library was first established in 1896, it was located in the old Portsmouth Academy building at 8 Islington Street. In 1954 this building was joined to the adjacent Benedict House. This facility housed the library until 2006, when it occupied its present facility.

The new library, an $8 million construction project has Leadership in Energy and Environmental Design (LEED) certification from the U.S. Green Building Council. It is the first municipal building in New Hampshire and among the first public buildings in New England so certified. According to the Portsmouth city website, the library scored "high marks in the areas of energy conservation, recycling, building materials selection, and daylight and views".

=== Special Collections room ===
The library's Special Collections room focuses on primary and secondary source reference materials related to Portsmouth, but also includes material on Rockingham County, Strafford County and, in Maine, York County. Among the collections are such documents as vital records, maps and historical newspapers.

The library also includes several unique collections, including:

- Henry Clay Barnabee Collection: Material belonging to or related to actor and singer Henry Clay Barnabee (1833–1917)
- World War II Records: Documents of historical interest compiled by the Portsmouth War Records Committee during World War II
- Art Collections: Including but not limited to watercolors by Sarah Haven Foster (1827–1900), drawings by Helen Pearson (1871–1949), works by Susan Ricker Knox (~1875–1959) and paintings by Russell Cheney (1881–1945)
