= Château Klinglin =

Château in Bas-Rhin, Alsace, France

Coordinates: 48°31′58″N 7°42′53″E

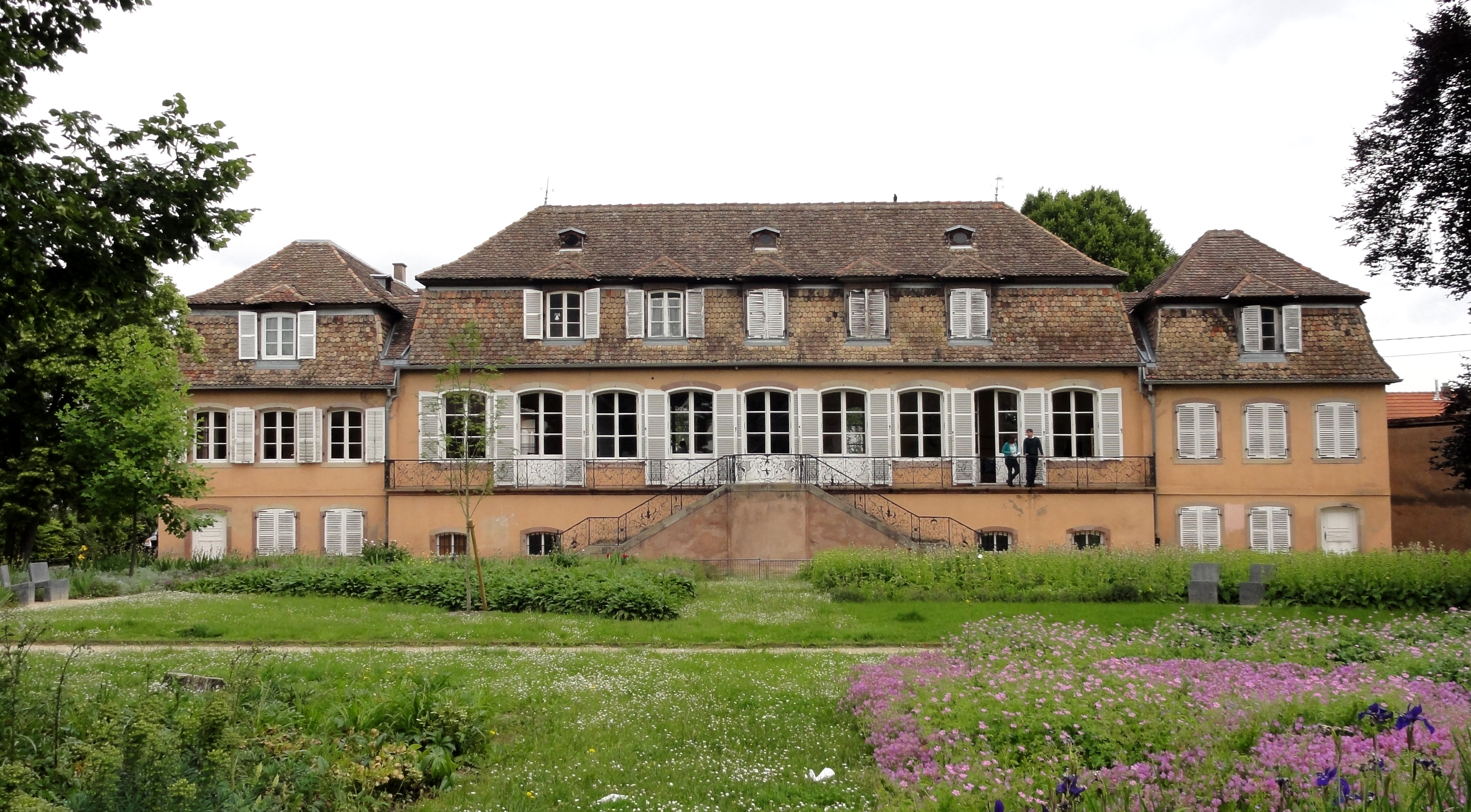
Former Klinglin or Illhaeusern castle

Château Klinglin is a château in the commune of Illkirch-Graffenstaden, in the department of Bas-Rhin, Alsace, France. Built in 1735, it became a Monument historique in 1970.
