= 1877 in architecture =

The year 1877 in architecture involved some significant events.

== Buildings and structures ==
=== Buildings ===
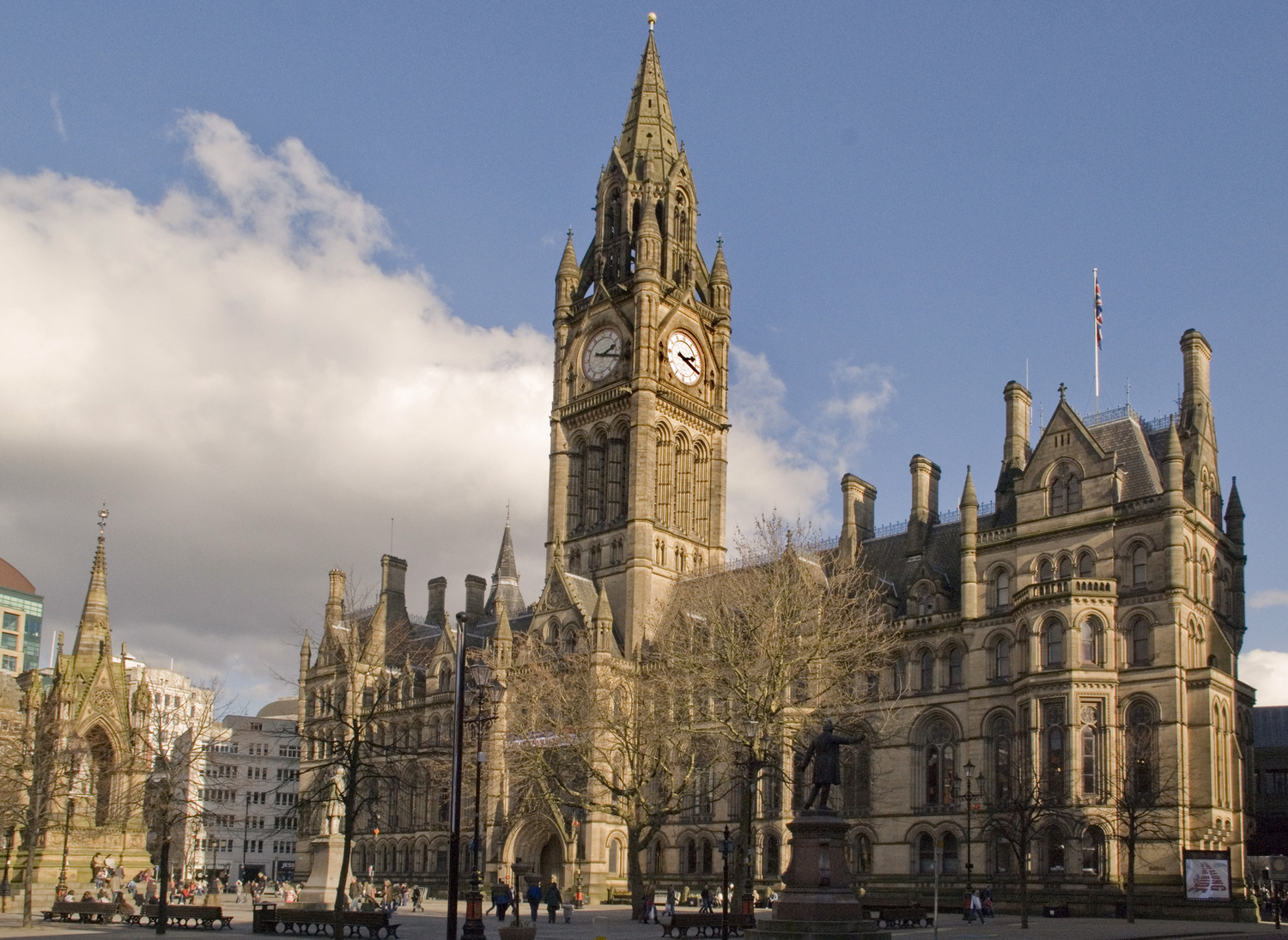
Manchester Town Hall, England

- Galleria Vittorio Emanuele II (shopping arcade) in Milan, designed by Giuseppe Mengoni, is completed.
- Galleria dell'Industria Subalpina in Turin, designed by Pietro Carrera, is completed.
- Manchester Town Hall in Manchester, England, designed by Alfred Waterhouse, is completed.
- Trinity Church (Boston) in the United States, designed by Henry Hobson Richardson, is consecrated.
- New railway stations for the North Eastern Railway (United Kingdom) are completed at York, largely designed by Thomas Prosser, and Middlesbrough, designed by William Peachey.
- Maria Pia Bridge in Porto, Portugal, built by Gustave Eiffel, is completed.
- Rebuilt Ardverikie House in Scotland, designed by John Rhind, is completed.

== Events ==
- March 22 – Society for the Protection of Ancient Buildings established by William Morris and others meeting in Bloomsbury, London.
- Richard Norman Shaw appointed architect to Bedford Park, London.

== Awards ==
- RIBA Royal Gold Medal – Charles Barry (junior).

== Births ==
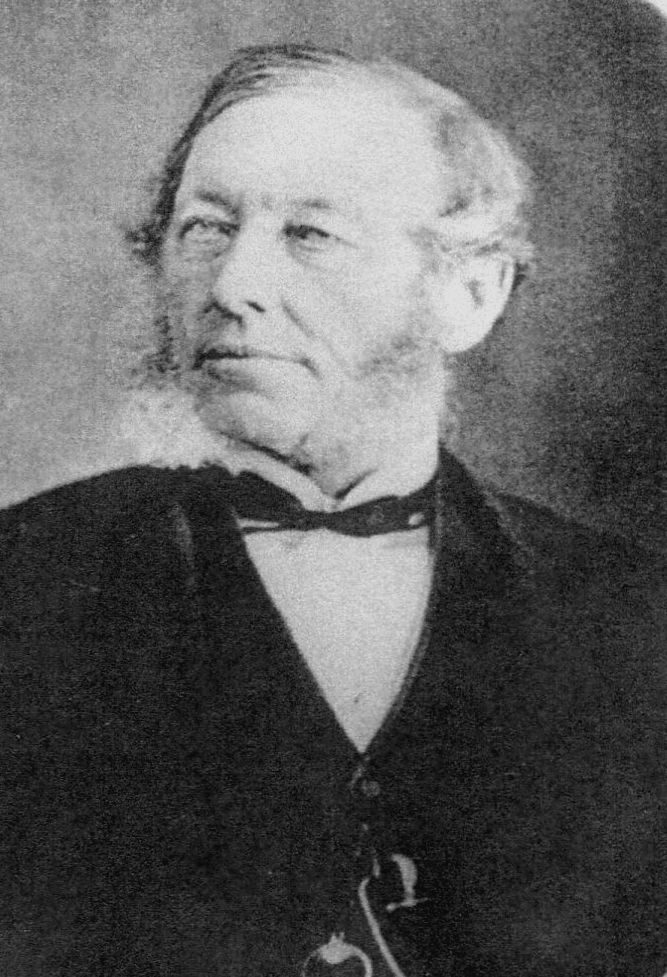
Edmund Sharpe

- May 14 – Randall Wells, English Arts and Crafts architect (died 1942)
- June 12 – Johann Friedrich Höger, German architect (died 1949)
- December 6 – Paul Bonatz, German architect (died 1956)
- Frank Baines, English Arts and Crafts architect (died 1933)

== Deaths ==
- February 23 – Thomas Talbot Bury, English architect and lithographer (died 1809)
- May 8 – Edmund Sharpe, English architect and architectural historian (born 1809)
- October 8 – John Raphael Rodrigues Brandon, English Gothic Revival architect (born 1817)
