= Portsmouth Academy building =

- Portsmouth Public Library
- U.S. National Register of Historic Places
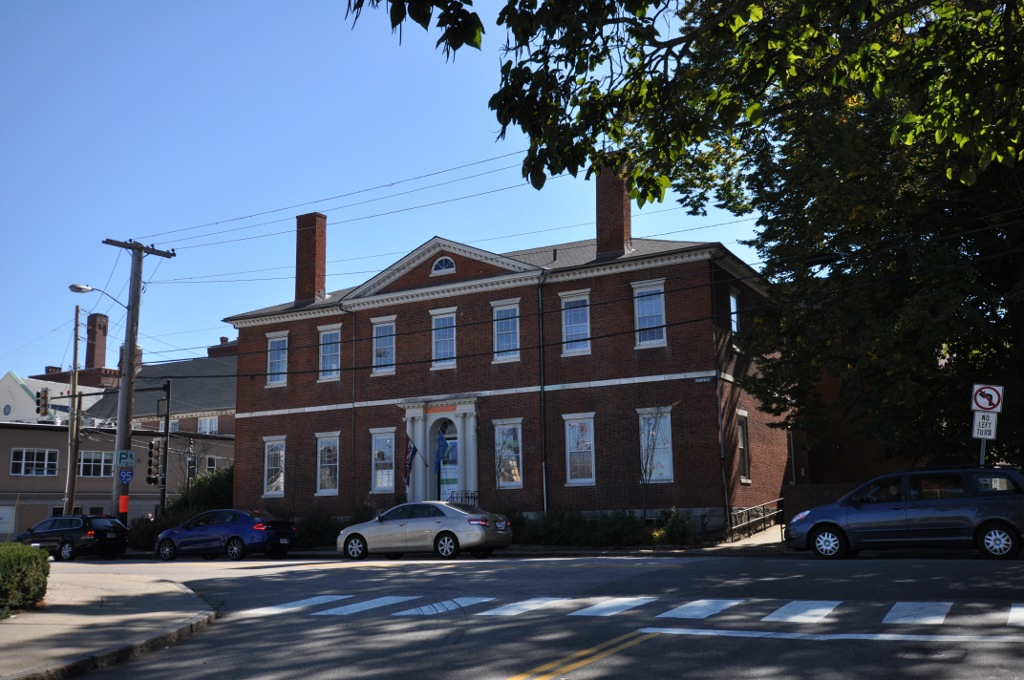

- Location within New Hampshire Location within the United States
- Location: 8 Islington St., Portsmouth, New Hampshire
- Coordinates: 43°4′31″N 70°45′41″W
- Area: 0.3 acres (0.12 ha)
- Built: 1809
- Architect: Nutter, James
- NRHP reference No.: 73000172
- Added to NRHP: March 20, 1973

The Portsmouth Academy building is a historic academic and civic building at 8 Islington Street in Portsmouth, New Hampshire. Built in 1809, it is one of the finest surviving examples of an early 19th-century academic building in northern New England, and is attributed to James Nutter, one of the finest local builders of the period. In addition to housing the Portsmouth Academy, it later housed the city's public library, and presently houses the Portsmouth Historical Society galleries, gift shop and the Discover Portsmouth Welcome Center. It was listed on the National Register of Historic Places in 1973 as "Portsmouth Public Library".

== Description and history ==
The former Portsmouth Academy building stands on the western fringe of downtown Portsmouth, at the southeast corner of Middle and Islington Streets. It is a two-story brick structure with a hip roof and a cut granite foundation. Its original main facade faces Islington Street, and is seven bays wide. Windows are set in rectangular openings, with marble sills and splayed lintels. A marble stringcourse separates the two floors, and the roof cornice is adorned with dentil moulding. The center three bays project slightly, and are topped by a pedimented gable with a half-round window at its center. The main entrance is in the center bay, set in a round-arch opening flanked by paired engaged Ionic columns.

The academy was designed by local designer-builder James Nutter and built in 1809. Its Federal style resembles other academy buildings (including an early building at the Phillips Exeter Academy), and its design was for a time attributed to Charles Bulfinch. The building was acquired by the city and converted for use to house the Portsmouth Public Library in the 1890s. At this time its interior was extensively altered; the extant skylights were probably added at this time as well. In 1954 a brick connector joined this building to the adjacent Benedict House. The building served as the public library until 2006, when the library moved to a new facility at 175 Parrott Avenue. The buildings are now leased to the Portsmouth Historical Society, which operates the Discover Portsmouth center.

== See also ==
- National Register of Historic Places listings in Rockingham County, New Hampshire
