= Ostwald, Bas-Rhin =

Ostwald
- Commune
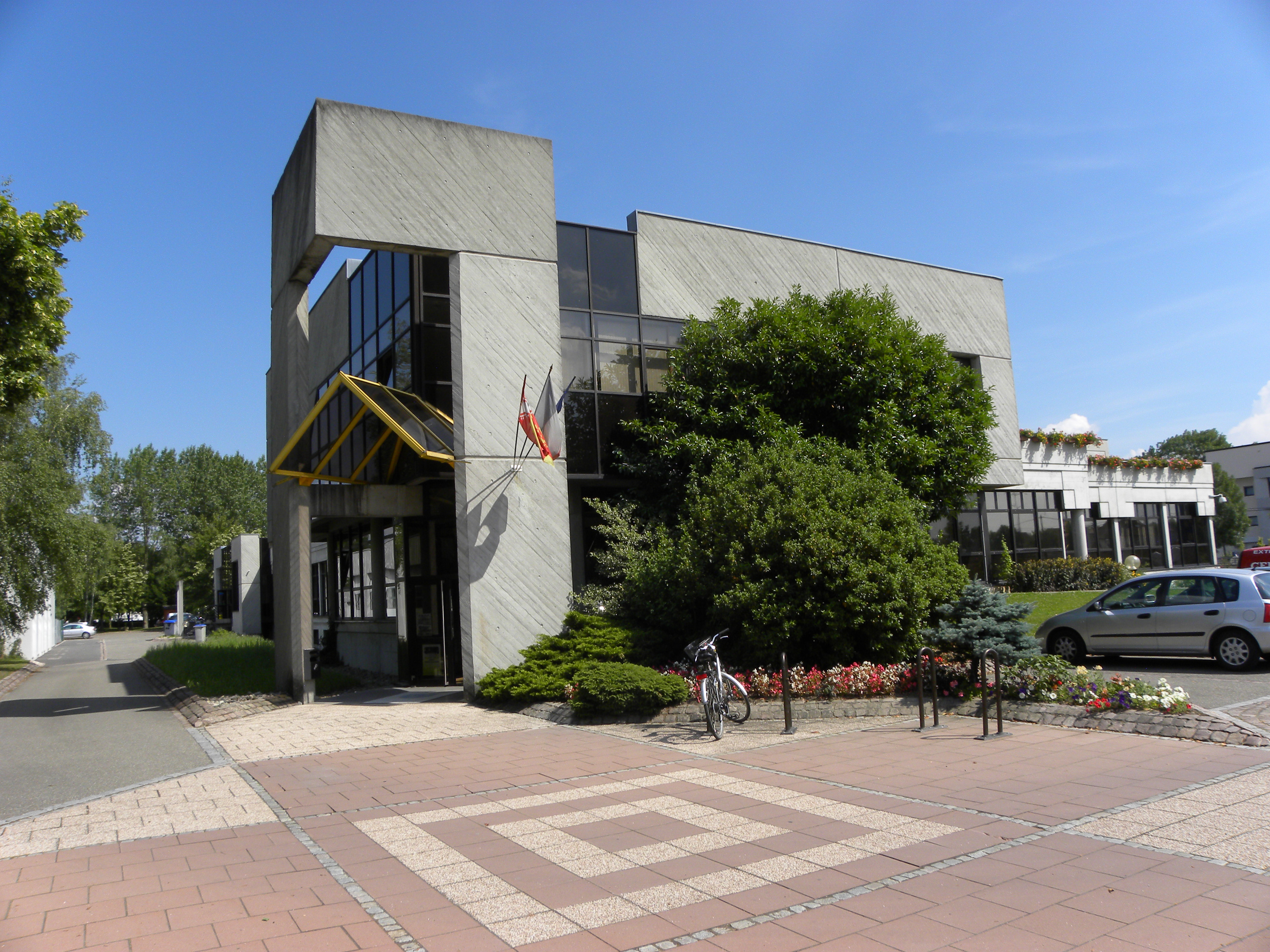
- The town hall in Ostwald

- Coat of arms
- Location of Ostwald
- Location within France Location within Grand Est
- Coordinates: 48°32′33″N 7°42′37″E
- Country: France
- Region: Grand Est
- Department: Bas-Rhin
- Arrondissement: Strasbourg
- Canton: Illkirch-Graffenstaden
- Intercommunality: Strasbourg Eurométropole

Government
  - Mayor (2020–2026): Fabienne Baas
- Area^{1}: 7.11 km^{2} (2.75 sq mi)
- Elevation: 140 m (460 ft)
- Highest elevation: 144 m (472 ft)
- Lowest elevation: 139 m (456 ft)
- Population (2023): 13,946
  - Density: 1,960/km^{2} (5,080/sq mi)
- Time zone: UTC+01:00 (CET)
  - Summer (DST): UTC+02:00 (CEST)
- INSEE/Postal code: 67365 /67540
- ^{1} French Land Register data, which excludes lakes, ponds, glaciers > 1 km^{2} (0.386 sq mi or 247 acres) and river estuaries.

Ostwald (French pronunciation: [ɔstvald]; Alsatian: Oschwold) is a commune in the Bas-Rhin department in Grand Est in north-eastern France.

== History ==
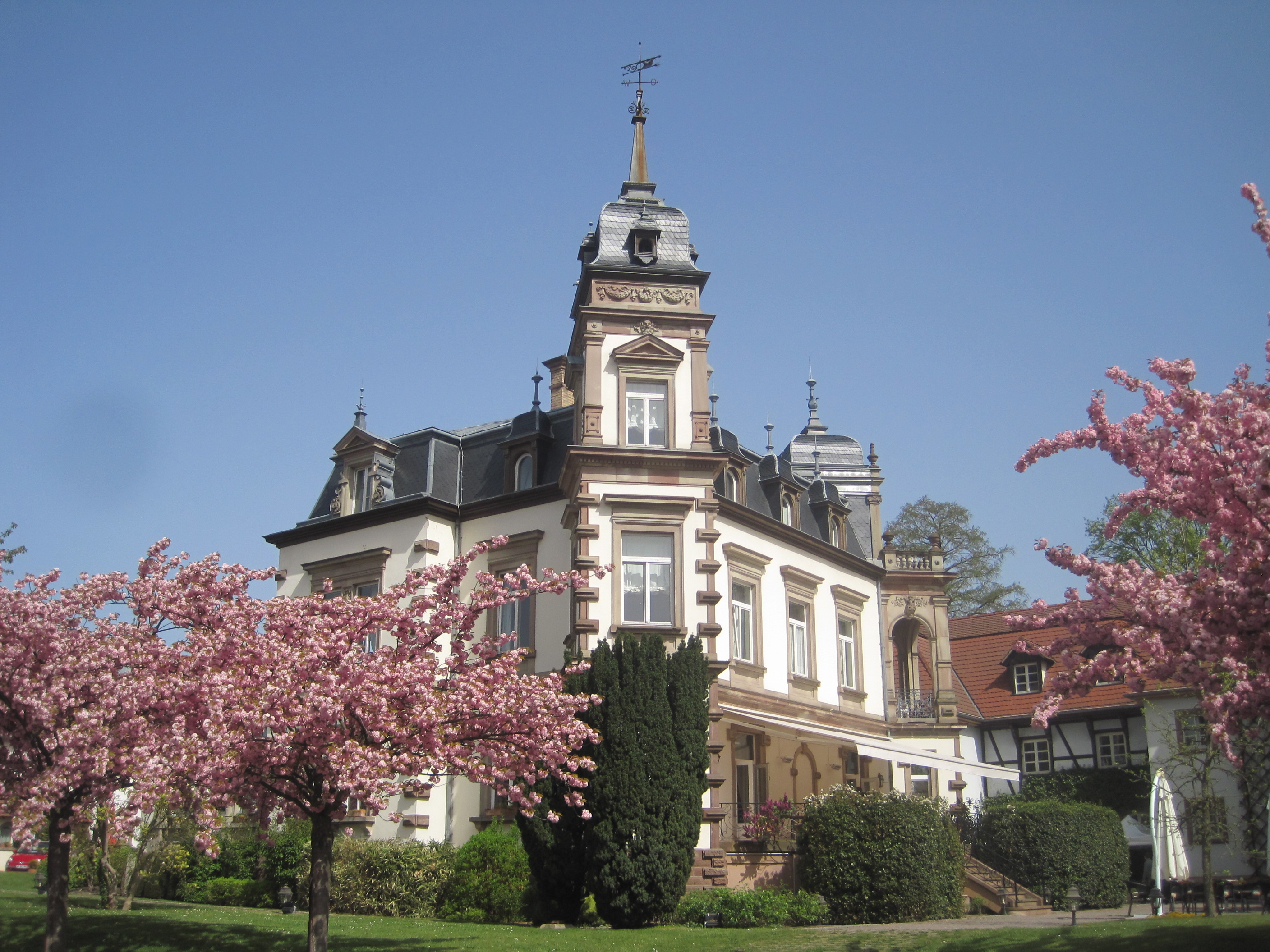
Château de l'Île in Ostwald

The ancient name of Ostwald, Wickersheim, is first attested on a map of the emperor Charles the Fat in 884. In the time of the emperor Frederick I Barbarossa, within the realm of the Holy Roman Empire, the Hohenstaufens built a castle by the Ill River. In 1285, the city was acquired by the Zorn family of Strasbourg and took the name of Illwickersheim, also sometimes called Sankt Ostwald after the name of a parish.

The plague of 1348 and mercenary raids in 1365 and 1376 decimated the population.

In 1418 the city of Strasbourg gained control of Illwickersheim; at the same time it acquired Illkirch-Graffenstaden.

The act of annexation of Alsace to the kingdom of France took place in Illkirch in 1681, after which Illwickersheim experienced a period of peace and prosperity, with the introduction of potato farming, which saw an increase in the city's area and population. A new name under the influence of Irish missionaries was Oswald, in honor of Oswald of Northumbria.

After the French Revolution the name settled on Ostwald, and during the 19th century the population doubled from 657 residents in 1806 to 1,290 in 1895. Ostwald became independent while it developed industry around the Société Alsacienne de Constructions Mécaniques (S.A.C.M.), agriculture and services, such as the Colonie agricole, the name of a youth internment center.

In 1912 a quarry opened, creating many jobs, while the commune of Ostwald developed and augmented its infrastructure. The Second World War caused a recession and a bombing on 25 September 1944 reduced its population.

During the postwar period the population grew, and in 1946 there were 3,200 residents. In 1954 the Société de Construction d'Ostwald (S.C.O.) constructed tenements. The urban development of the 1960s and 1970s caused expansion to new neighborhoods such as Wihrel and the construction of facilities such as schools and daycare centers. Population growth was rapid, from 3,584 residents in 1954 to 9,900 in 1982 and 10,820 in 1999.

In the 1980s a shopping center, La Vigie, was constructed, which contained more than 40 businesses. Despite this, there are still 180 commercial establishments and artisans in the urban center.

== Population ==
Historical population
Year	Pop.	±% p.a.
1968	5,717	—
1975	8,688	+6.16%
1982	9,876	+1.85%
1990	10,197	+0.40%
1999	10,761	+0.60%
2007	10,761	+0.00%
2012	11,682	+1.66%
2017	12,604	+1.53%
2023	13,946	+1.70%
Source: INSEE

== See also ==
- Communes of the Bas-Rhin department
