= Château de l'Île =

Coordinates: 48°32′41″N 7°42′50″E

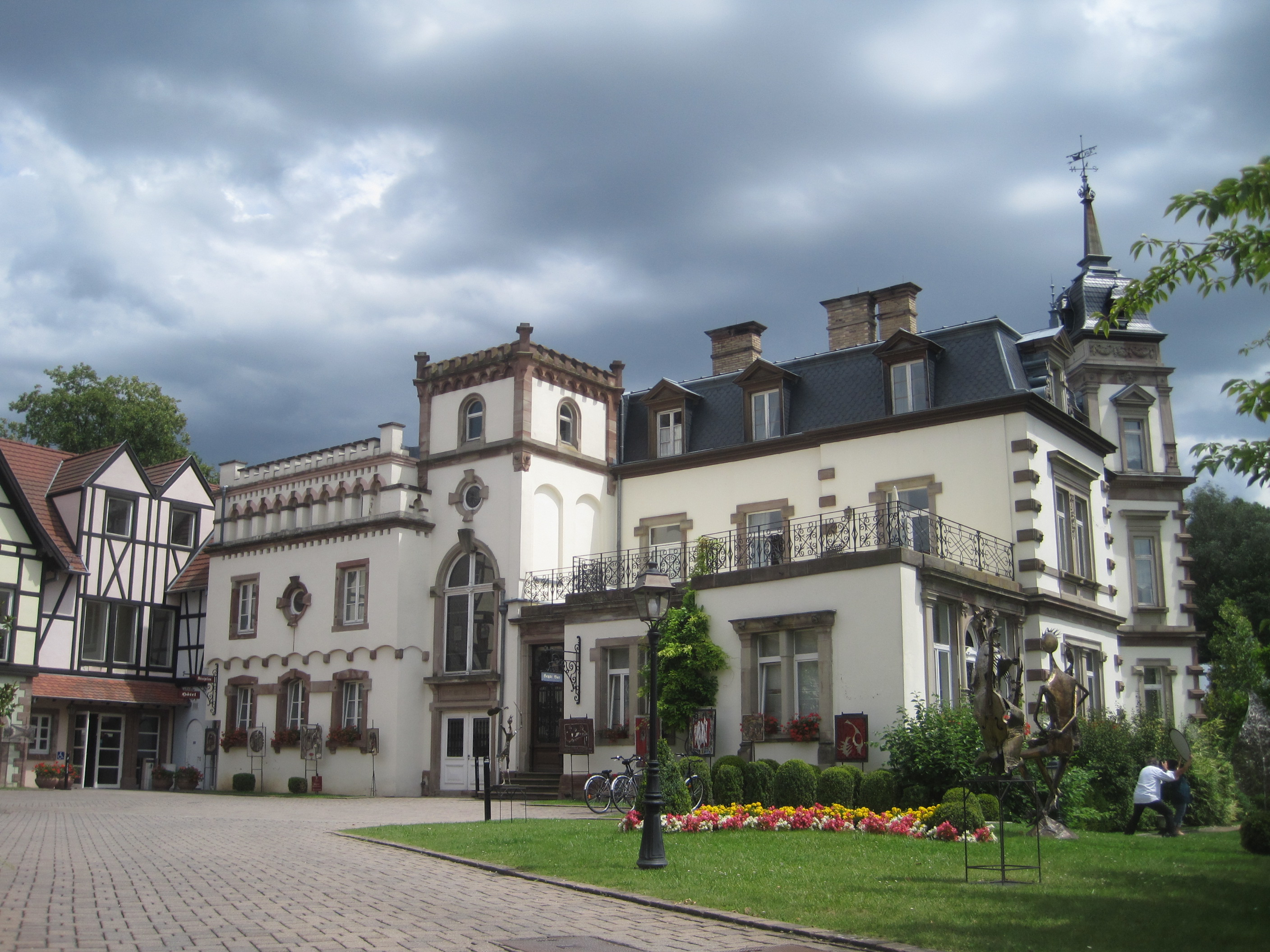
- Interactive map of the Château de l'Île area
- Former names: Schloss Inselburg

General information
- Type: Castle
- Architectural style: Renaissance, Neo-Renaissance
- Location: Ostwald, Bas-Rhin, 4, quai Heydt; 67540 Ostwald, France
- Current tenants: Les Grandes Étapes Françaises
- Construction started: 17th century
- Completed: 1891; 1994

Other information
- Number of rooms: 62 (including modern wing)

Website
- http://www.grandesetapes.com/en/castle-hotel-ile-strasbourg

The Château de l'Île is a former castle in Ostwald, France, now used as luxury hotel.

The present building was built in 1891 by the entrepreneur Léonard Heydt (1829–1901), who also served as the mayor of Ostwald from 1861 until his death. It re-employs elements of a previous castle from the early 17th century, which had probably replaced an even earlier castle (the first mention of a castle in Ostwald dates from the year 1226). The Renaissance elements of the 17th-century castle were integrated into the Neo-Renaissance designs commissioned by Heydt, who called his property by the German name of Schloss Inselburg (literally: "Castle Fortress-on-the-Island"), since Alsace was part of the German Empire in 1891. The French name of the castle translates as "Castle of the Island", since the grounds are indeed surrounded by a small lateral arm of the river Ill.

In 1918, the castle was bought by the Darbois family and used as a tea factory (Les thés du château de l'Île) starting in 1921. It was abandoned in the late 1960s, with the end of the Darbois's business, and stood empty until 1991, when it was bought by Pierre Traversac of the luxury hotel group Les Grandes Étapes Françaises. Traversac added lateral wings in the local half-timbered architectural style and the hotel opened in 1994.

== Gallery ==
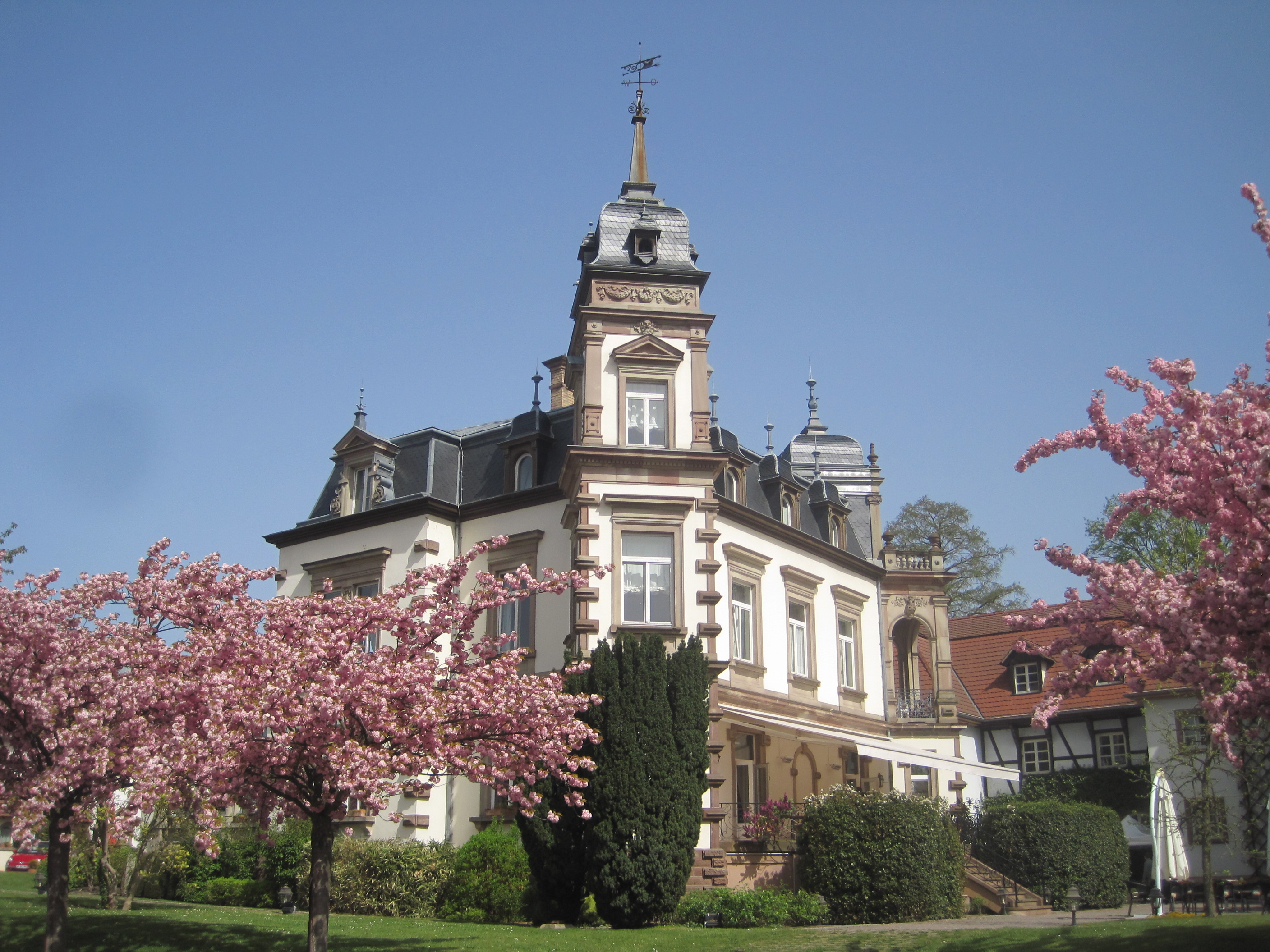
The castle

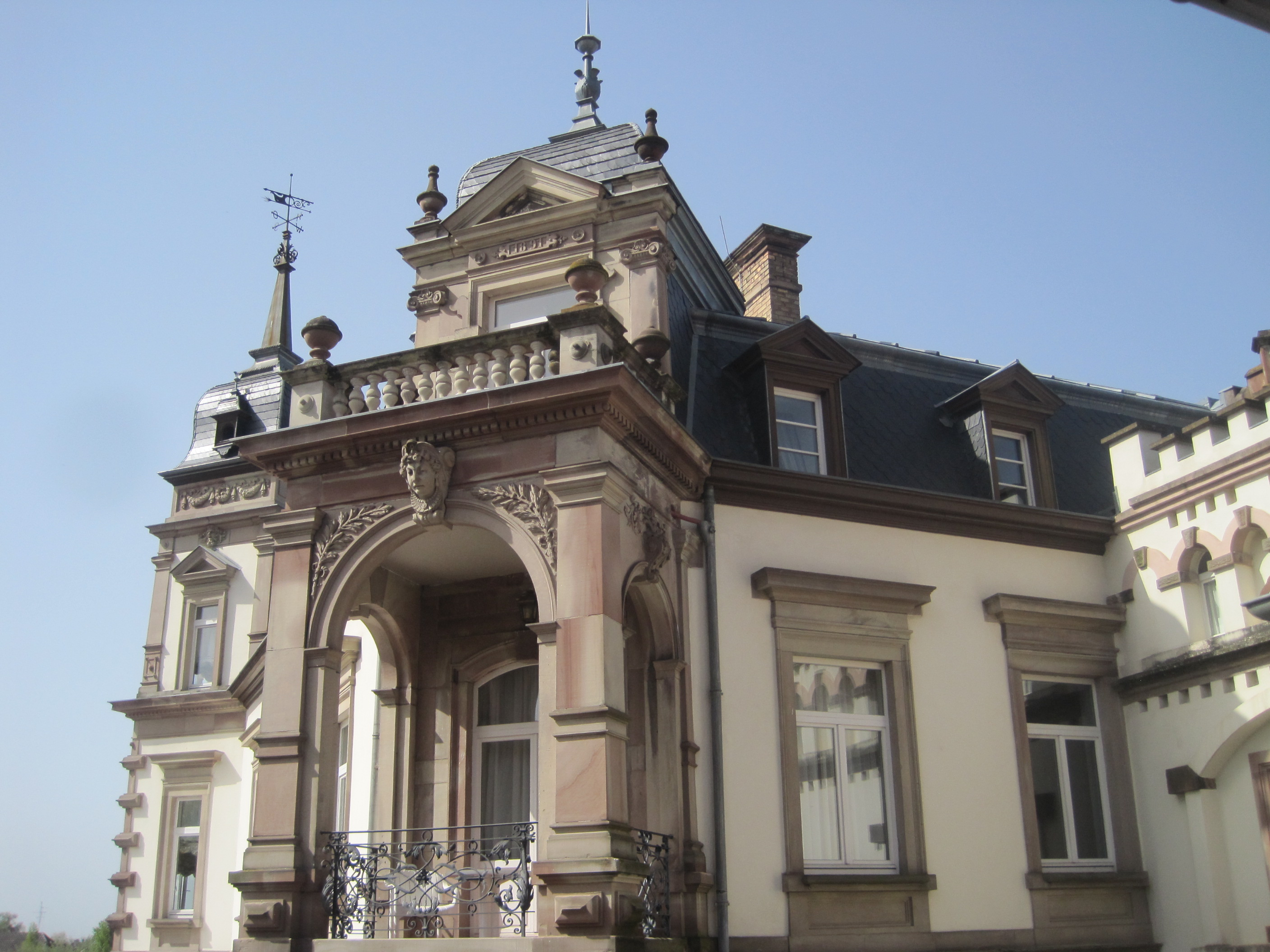
Detail of the castle with the completion date 1891

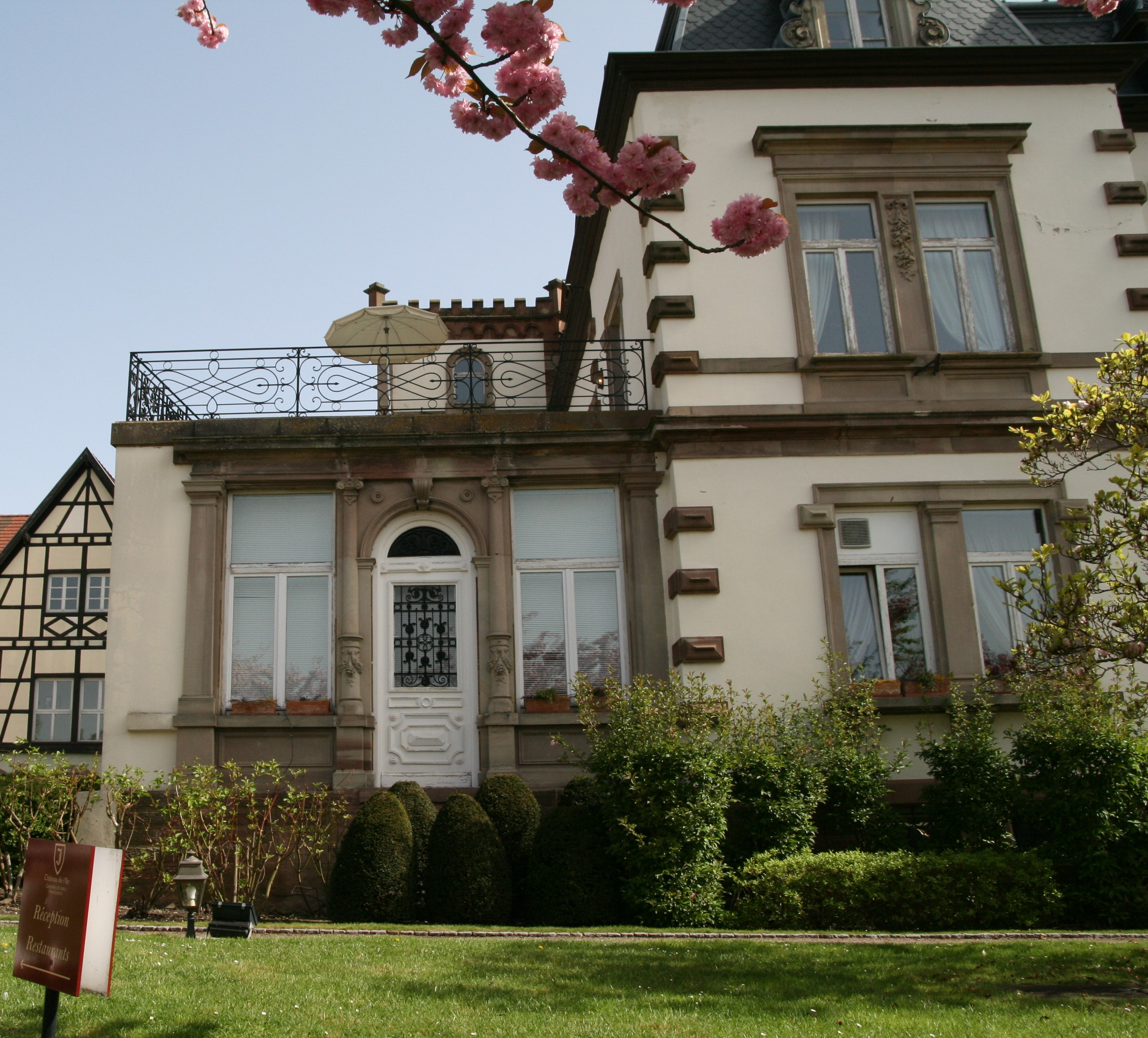
Detail of the castle with re-employed Renaissance elements on the left

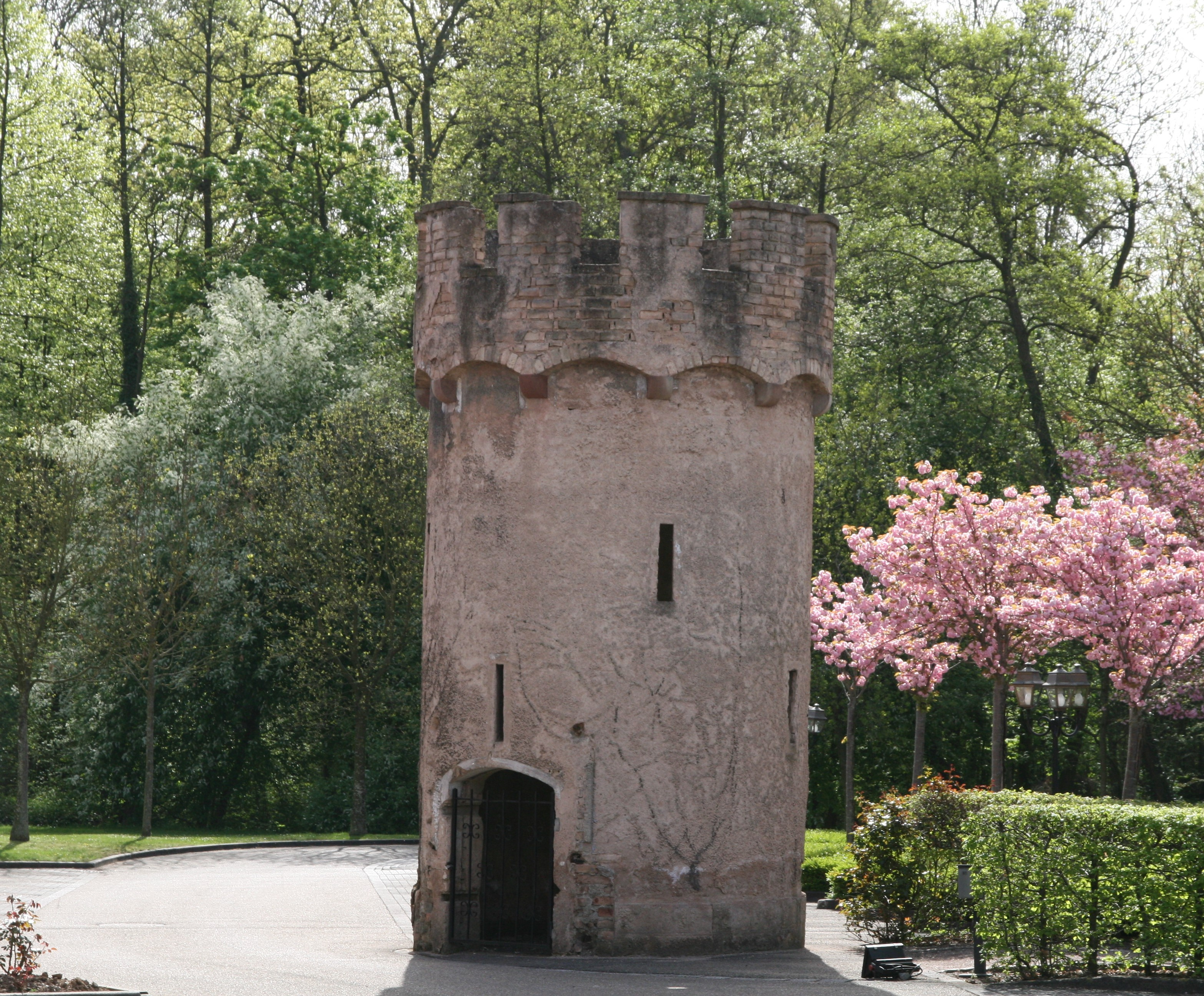
Ancient guard tower in the castle garden
