= Benedict House (Portsmouth, New Hampshire) =

Historic house in New Hampshire, United States

- U.S. National Register of Historic Places
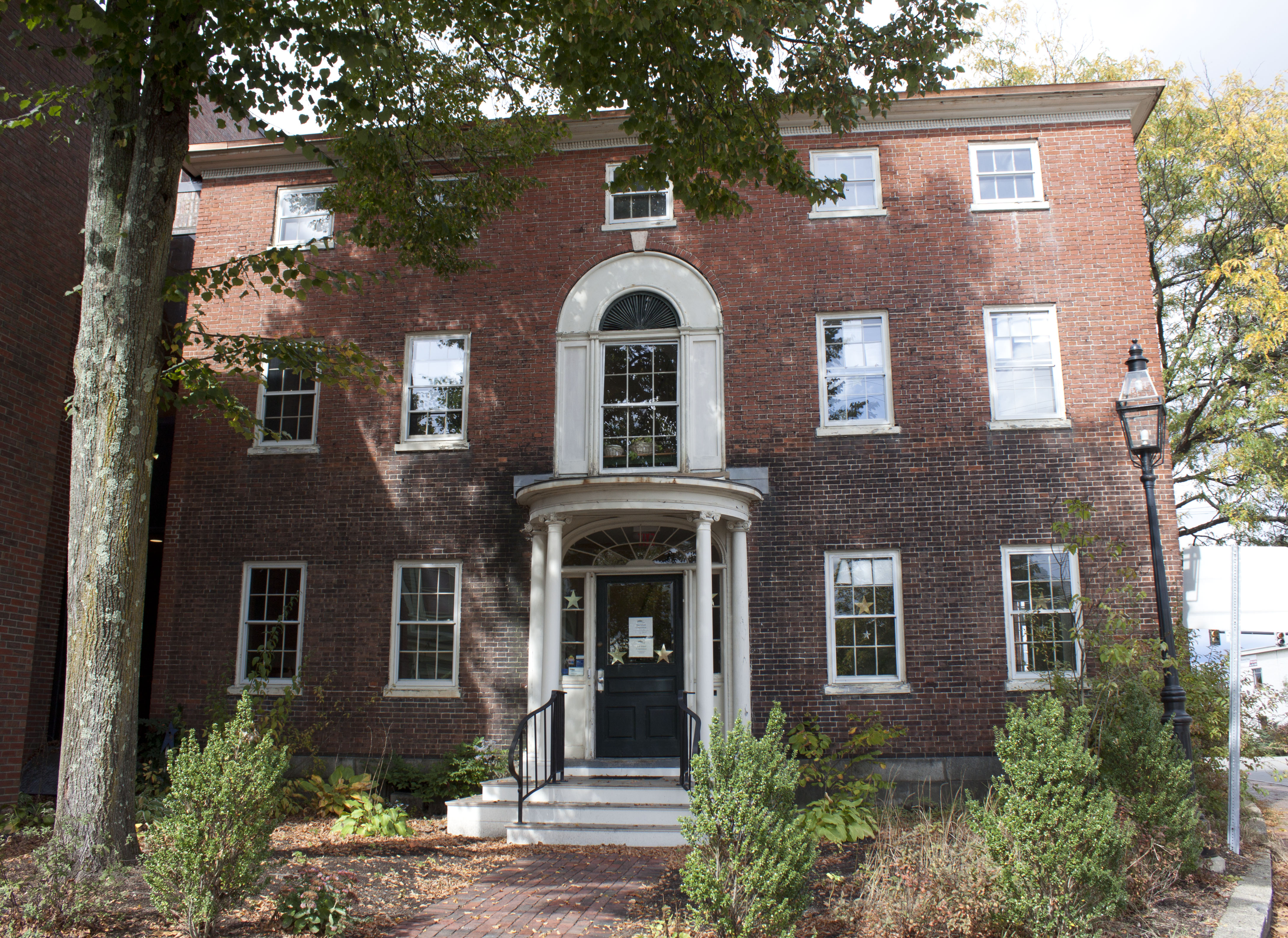

- Location within New Hampshire Location within the United States
- Location: 30 Middle St., Portsmouth, New Hampshire
- Coordinates: 43°4′31″N 70°45′41″W
- Area: 0.3 acres (0.12 ha)
- Built: 1811
- Built by: Folsom, Jonathan
- NRHP reference No.: 73000168
- Added to NRHP: May 11, 1973

The Benedict House, also known as the Thomas Penhallow House, is a historic house at 30 Middle Street in Portsmouth, New Hampshire. Built in 1810–1813, it is a fine example of Federal style architecture, and may be an early work of the noted local builder Jonathan Folsom. The house was joined in 1954 to the adjacent Portsmouth Academy building when it housed the city's public library; this complex is now home to Discover Portsmouth, a local tourism promotion organization. It was listed on the National Register of Historic Places in 1973.

== Description and history ==
The Benedict House stands near the western end of Portsmouth's Congress Street business district, on the west side of Middle Street. The Academy building, to which it is connected, faces north to Congress Street; the house faces south toward a parking lane. It is three stories in height, and is built out of brick and covered with a gabled roof. The brick is laid in Flemish bond throughout, and its workmanship is of exceptionally high quality when compared to that of other period buildings in the city. The main entrance is its most elaborate exterior feature, with sidelights and fanlight transom window sheltered by a half-round portico supported by columns with Ionic capitals. Above the entrance is a sash window with half-round fan, framed by wooden paneling. The interior features include a fine curving staircase and carved fireplace mantels.

The house was built sometime between 1810 and 1813 for Thomas Morton, a local merchant. Its construction just outside central Portsmouth also apparently kicked off a minor building boom of fashionable houses in the immediate area. In 1814 Morton sold the house to Thomas Penhallow, another merchant. He sold it in 1835, and it passed through many owners before its acquisition by the city, originally to house the library.

== See also ==
- National Register of Historic Places listings in Rockingham County, New Hampshire
