= Teresa Borsuk =

British architect

Teresa Anna Borsuk
- Born: November 1956 (age 69)
- Occupation: Architect
- Awards: Woman Architect of the Year
- Practice: Duffy, Eley, Giffone, Worthington, Pollard Thomas Edwards
- Projects: Waltham Abbey Royal Gunpowder Mills

Teresa Anna Borsuk (born November 1956) is a British architect. She is senior partner at the architectural firm Pollard Thomas Edwards, and was named Woman Architect of the Year by Architects' Journal in 2015. Her projects include the restoration of the Royal Gunpowder Mills in Waltham Abbey.

== Biography ==
Teresa Anna Borsuk was born in November 1956. She was interested in architecture from a young age; she has said that building model homes in her father's garage and playing with Lego "made me curious about the profession". She attended The Bartlett School of Architecture at University College London, receiving her Graduate Diploma in Architecture in 1981. She also spent a scholarship year at the University of Kansas.

The first architectural firm where Borsuk practised was DEGW, an architecture and design company founded by Frank Duffy, Peter Eley, Luigi Giffone and John Worthington that specialised in workplace design. Her first project was a conversion of Christie's offices in Amsterdam. She joined the practice Pollard Thomas Edwards in 1984 and has since completed projects in housing, refurbishments and mixed-use developments. These projects include the award-winning project 'The Granary', Walthamstow Town Centre in Walthamstow, Greater London, and the restoration of the Royal Gunpowder Mills in Waltham Abbey.

Borsuk was appointed executive director of Pollard Thomas Edwards in 1999 and became senior partner in 2014 as the firm celebrated its 40th anniversary. In the same year Borsuk completed a 76-home residential development called "The Avenue" in Saffron Walden, Essex. In 2015 she was named Woman Architect of the Year by Architects' Journal for her efforts to improve gender equality in her practice; the proportion of women on the staff of Pollard Thomas Edwards increased to over 50 percent under Borsuk's leadership.
