= Hans Robert Hiegel =

German architect

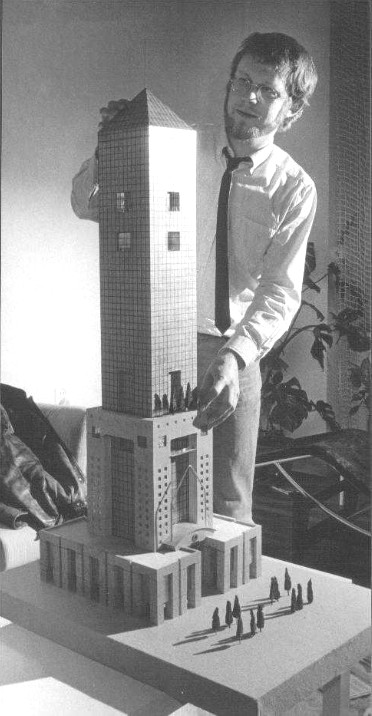
Hans Robert Hiegel.

Hans Robert Hiegel (born 1954) is a German architect based in Karlsruhe.

== Career ==
Hiegel was born in Kaiserslautern. He lived in London until 1978 and in 1982 he founded the architecture firm H.R. Hiegel Architekten. His first work was House Agne, 1983. Succeeding projects tend to a classical architectural style. Important articles include Werkheft04 (ISBN 3-923222-03-3), and by Thilo Hilpert in the Frankfurt Lounge, first published in the Japanese architectural journal A+U, Tokyo. He studied architecture at the University of Karlsruhe and at the Architectural Association (AA), together with Steven Holl. His teaching locations include the AA, the HfG Karlsruhe and the Bezalel Academy, Jerusalem.

== Work ==
In 1983, he designed the project Campanile in Frankfurt am Main, a skyscraper design with a height of 180 m. The pyramid atop the design turned out to be influential on the design of the Messeturm. Personal contacts to Joseph Rykwert who introduced him to the work and the person of Hans-Georg Gadamer were seminal to his philosophy and his thinking. "Oase" is the name of his prizewinning design for a Kindergarten near Baden-Baden which continues his quest for classical positions in architectural language.

== Publications ==
- Architecture in Transition, (exhibition catalog) Kaiserslautern Architekten: Gianni Braghieri, Hans Robert Hiegel, Steven Holl, Lars Lerup, Mark Mack, Simon Ungers, Peter Wilson; ISBN 3-89422-003-1
- Architekturbiennale 1985, Venice, ISBN 88-208-0323-2
- L`Architettura nella società post-industriale, Paolo Portoghesi, Philip Johnson, Peter Eisenman, Michael Graves, Emilio Ambasz, Hans Robert Hiegel, Massimo Scolari; Electra Editrice: Milan, Paris, New York
- Campanile, LEGO ua Architekten/Künstler W. Hahn, Jochem Jourdan, EO Parry, HR Hiegel, K. Lafitte Abrams, New York, ISBN 0-8109-1790-4
- H.R.Hiegel, Werkheft eines Architekten, 2001, sw-Abbildungen und Text von Dr. Mathias Schreiber, ISBN 3-923222-01-7
- Neoclassico, C.di R. Masiero; ua Sol LeWitt, G. Merz, Ann u Patrick Poirier; ua James Stirling, Mario Campi, Aldo Rossi, Hans Robert Hiegel, Leon Krier, Robert Venturi, Venice: Marsillo Editori ISBN 88-317-5384-3
- Werkheft 08, Oswald Mathias Ungers, 80th birthday, Jo. Franzke, Vittorio Magnago Lampugnani, Vittorio Gregotti, Hans Robert Hiegel, Robert A. M. Stern, Klaus-Dieter Lehmann, Jean-Louis Cohen ISBN 978-3-923222-06-3
