= Salvador Valeri i Pupurull =

Catalan architect

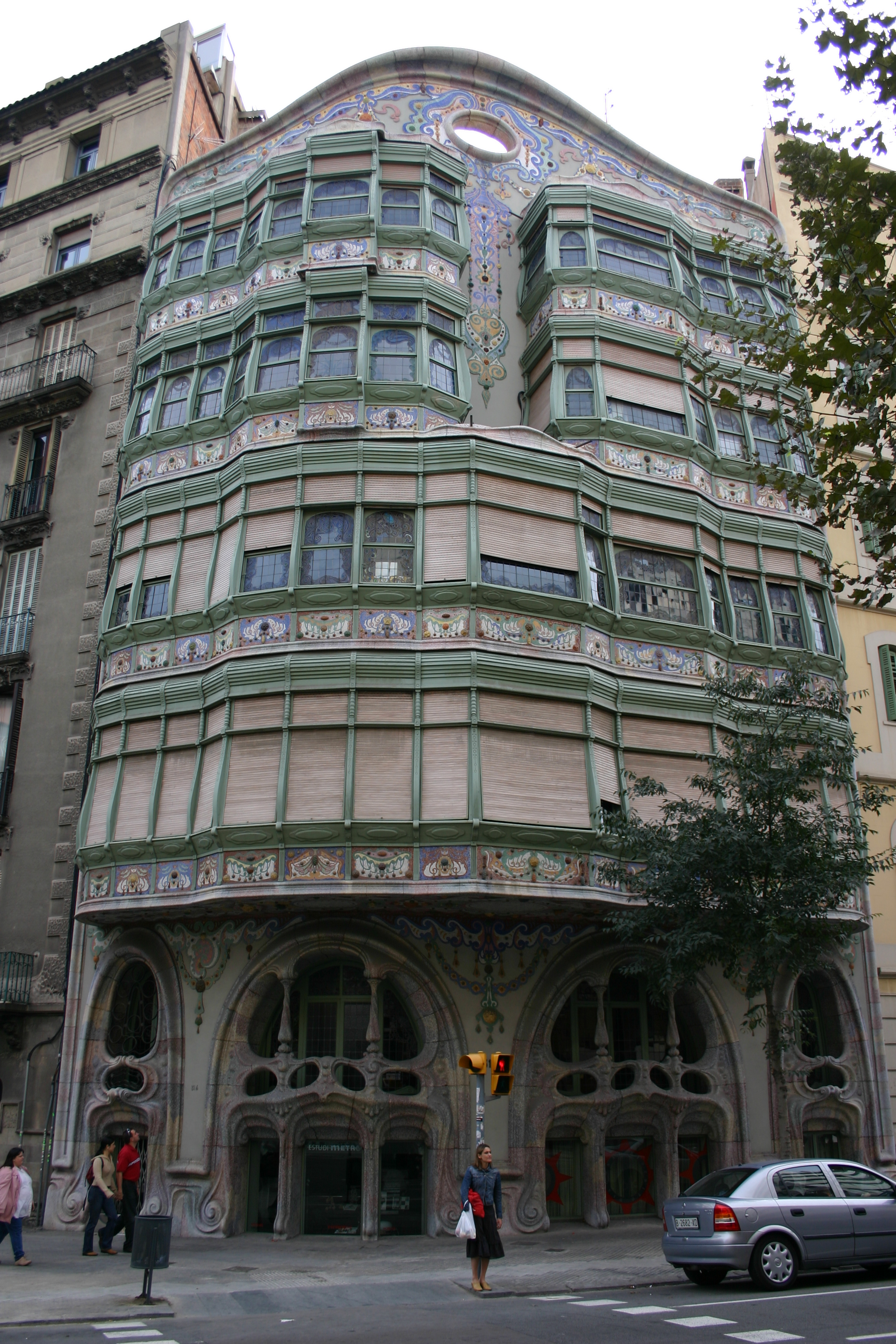
Casa Comalat

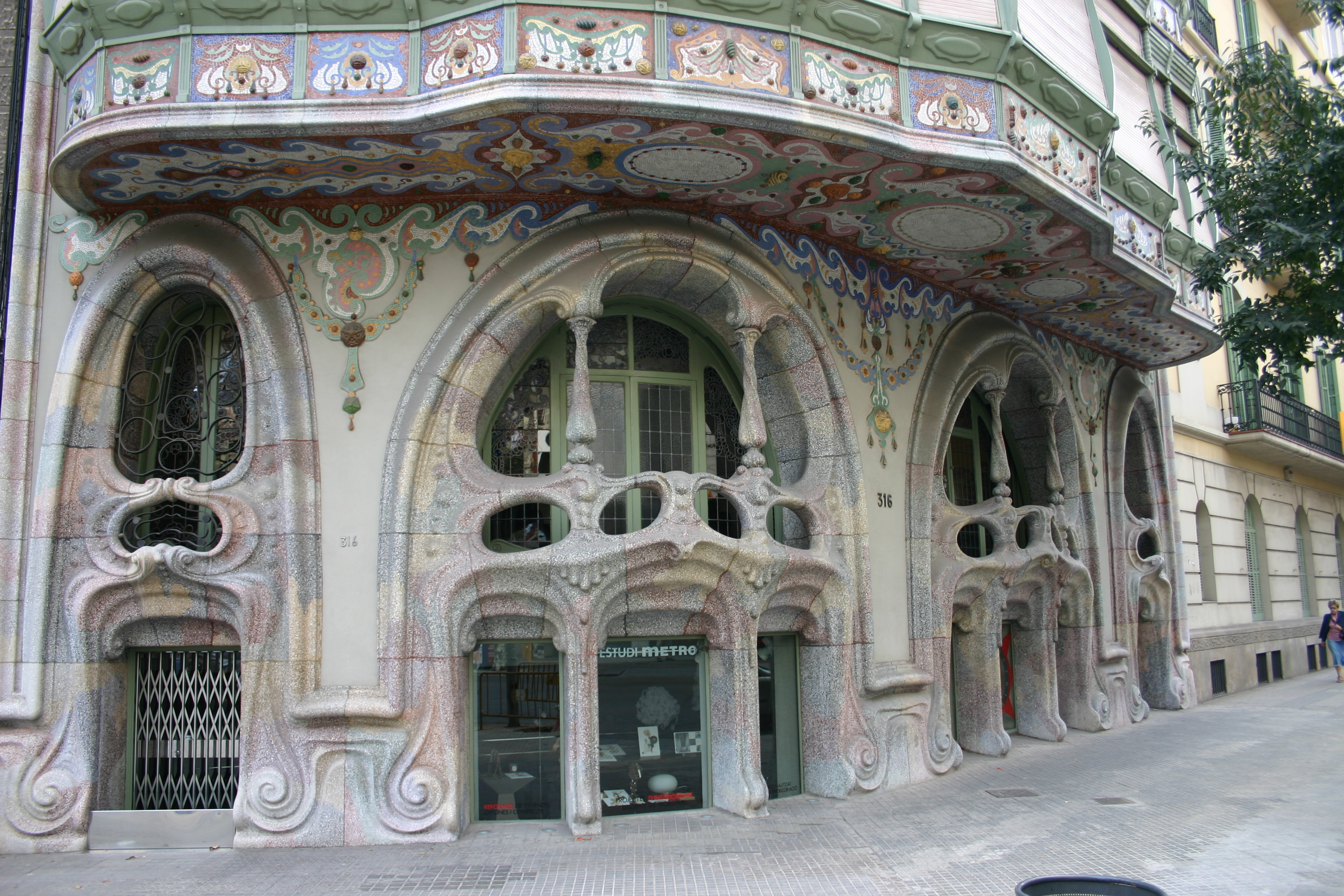
Casa Comalat

Salvador Valeri i Pupurull (1873–1954) was a Catalan architect who worked in the style of Modernisme.

Valeri was born in Barcelona and studied in the Polytechnical School of Madrid and the School of Architecture of Barcelona, where he obtained the degree of architect in 1899.

== See also ==
- Modernisme
- Art Nouveau
- Barcelona
