= 1974 in architecture =

The year 1974 in architecture involved some significant architectural events and new buildings.

== Events ==
- October – The Victoria and Albert Museum in London under Roy Strong opens an influential exhibition. 'The Destruction of the Country House 1875–1975', documenting the destruction of country houses in 20th-century Britain.
- Heikkinen – Komonen Architects established by Mikko Heikkinen and Markku Komonen in Helsinki, Finland.

== Buildings and structures ==
=== Buildings opened ===
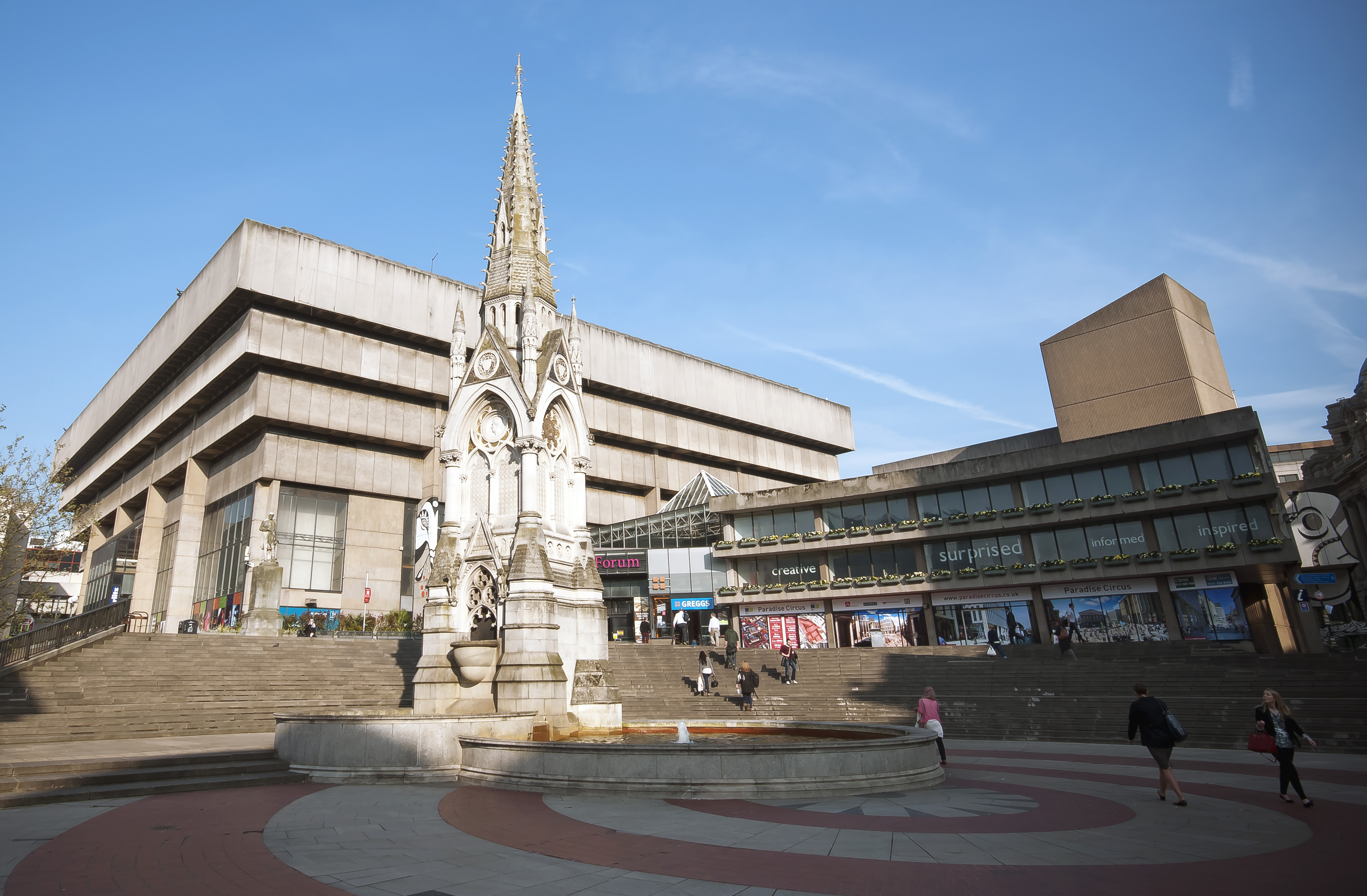
Birmingham Central Library in Birmingham, England

- Sears Tower in Chicago, Illinois, United States, designed by Skidmore, Owings and Merrill.
- Birmingham Central Library, Birmingham, UK, designed by John Madin (closed 2013).
- Horseferry Road Magistrates' Court in Westminster, London, designed by C. A. Legerton

=== Buildings completed ===
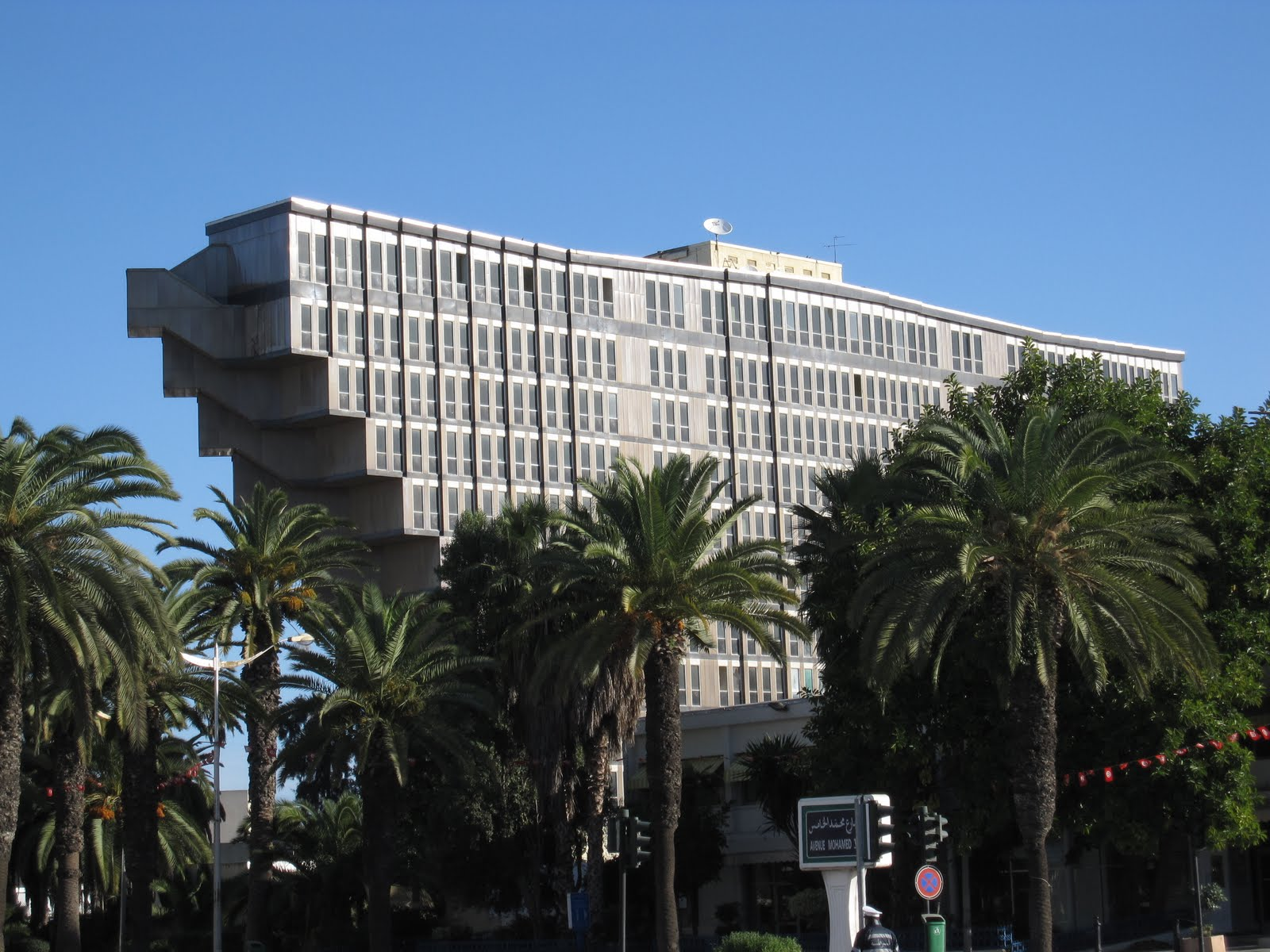
Hotel du Lac

- May 18 – The Warsaw radio mast in Poland, the second tallest structure ever built (it collapses on August 8, 1991).
- date unknown
- Renaissance Tower in Dallas, Texas, USA.
- AT&T Long Lines Building, 33 Thomas Street, New York, USA, designed by John Carl Warnecke.
- Kamzik TV Tower in Bratislava, Slovakia.
- Guy's Tower in London, United Kingdom, the world's tallest hospital at this time.
- Hudson Bay Centre in Toronto, Ontario, Canada.
- Palace of Weddings, Vilnius, Lithuanian Soviet Socialist Republic, designed by Gediminas Baravykas.
- Plastic classroom, Kennington Primary School, Preston, England.
- Hotel du Lac, Tunis, designed by Raffaele Contigiani.
- Laurie Short House in Sydney, Australia, designed by Glenn Murcutt.

== Awards ==
- Architecture Firm Award – Kevin Roche John Dinkeloo and Associates
- RAIA Gold Medal – Raymond Berg
- RIBA Royal Gold Medal – Powell & Moya
- Twenty-five Year Award – Johnson and Son Administration Building

== Births ==
- October 2 – Bjarke Ingels, Danish architect

== Deaths ==
- March 17 – Louis Kahn, American architect based in Philadelphia, USA (born 1901)
- April 6 – Willem Marinus Dudok, Dutch modernist architect (born 1884)
- April 25 – Gustavo R. Vincenti, Maltese architect and developer (born 1888)
- September 3 - Romuald Gutt, Polish architect (born 1888)
- November 28 – Konstantin Melnikov, Russian architect and painter (born 1890)
- December 12 – Sir Edward Maufe, English architect (born 1882)
