= 1884 in architecture =

The year 1884 in architecture involved some significant architectural events and new buildings.

== Buildings and structures ==
=== Buildings ===
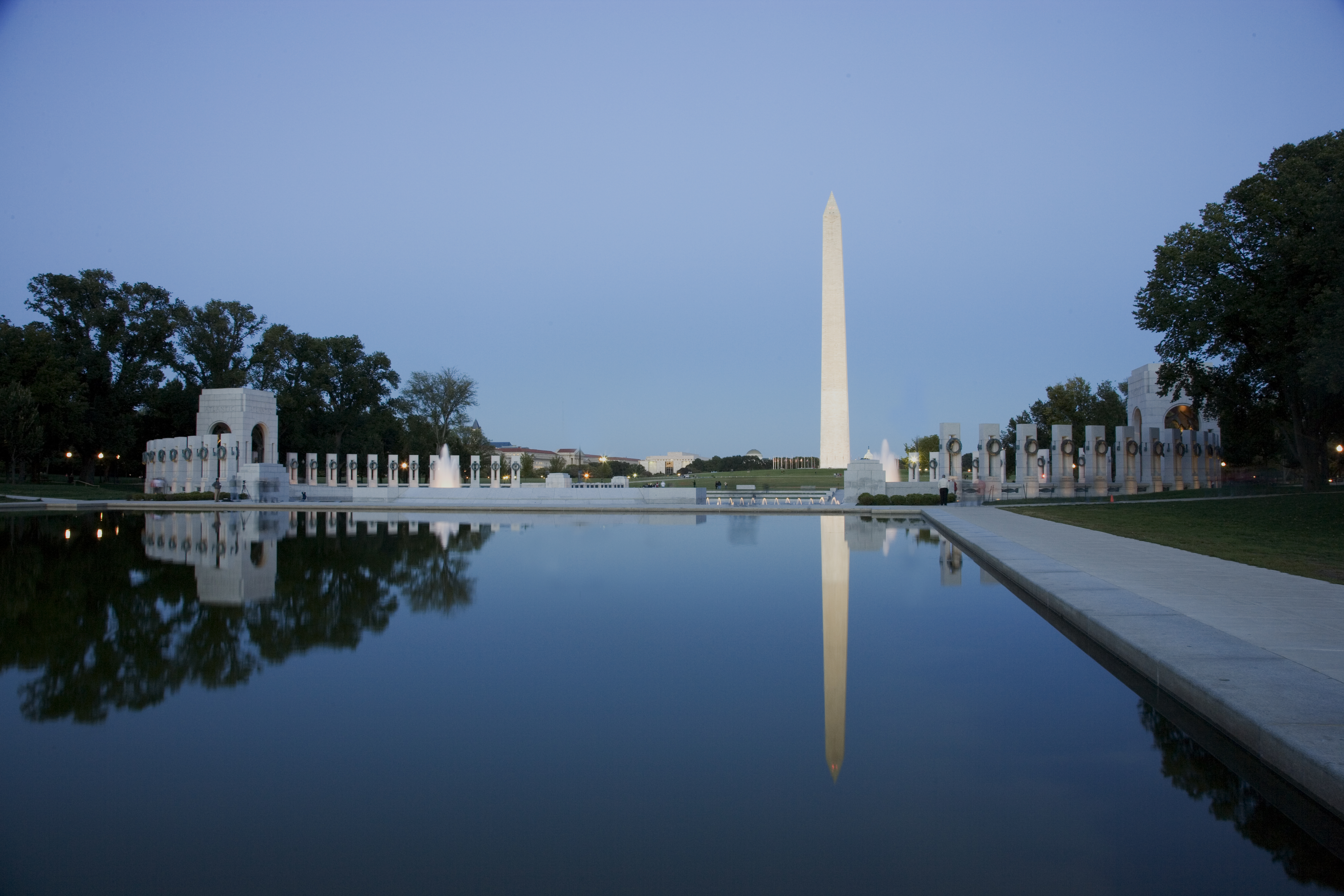
Washington Monument

- Antoni Gaudí becomes architect for the Sagrada Família church in Barcelona.
- Gustav Adolf Church, Liverpool, England, designed by W. D. Caröe, is completed.
- Washington Monument in Washington, D.C., designed by Robert Mills, is completed.
- Hungarian Royal Opera House in Budapest, designed by Miklós Ybl, is opened.
- Budapest Keleti railway station, designed by Gyula Rochlitz and János Feketeházy, is completed.
- Garabit viaduct in France, engineered by Gustave Eiffel and Maurice Koechlin, is completed.
- The Dakota apartment building on the Upper West Side of Manhattan in New York City, designed by Henry Janeway Hardenbergh, is completed.
- Cornerstone of Statue of Liberty laid in New York Harbor.

== Publications ==
- Frederic Growse – Bulandshahr: Or, Sketches of an Indian District: Social, Historical and Architectural

== Awards ==
- RIBA Royal Gold Medal – William Butterfield.
- Grand Prix de Rome, architecture: Hector d'Espouy.

== Births ==
- February 6 – Vlastislav Hofman, Czech artist and Cubist-influenced architect (died 1964)
- February 12 – Norman Jewson, English Arts and Crafts architect (died 1975)
- July 6 – Willem Marinus Dudok, Dutch Modernist architect (died 1974)
- August 27 – Alfredo Baldomir, Uruguayan soldier, architect and politician (died 1948)
- September 26 – Antonio Barluzzi, Italian Franciscan friar and architect, known as the "Architect of the Holy Land" (died 1960)
- November 24 – Michel de Klerk, Dutch Amsterdam School architect (died 1923)
- Ernest George Trobridge, British architect (died 1942)

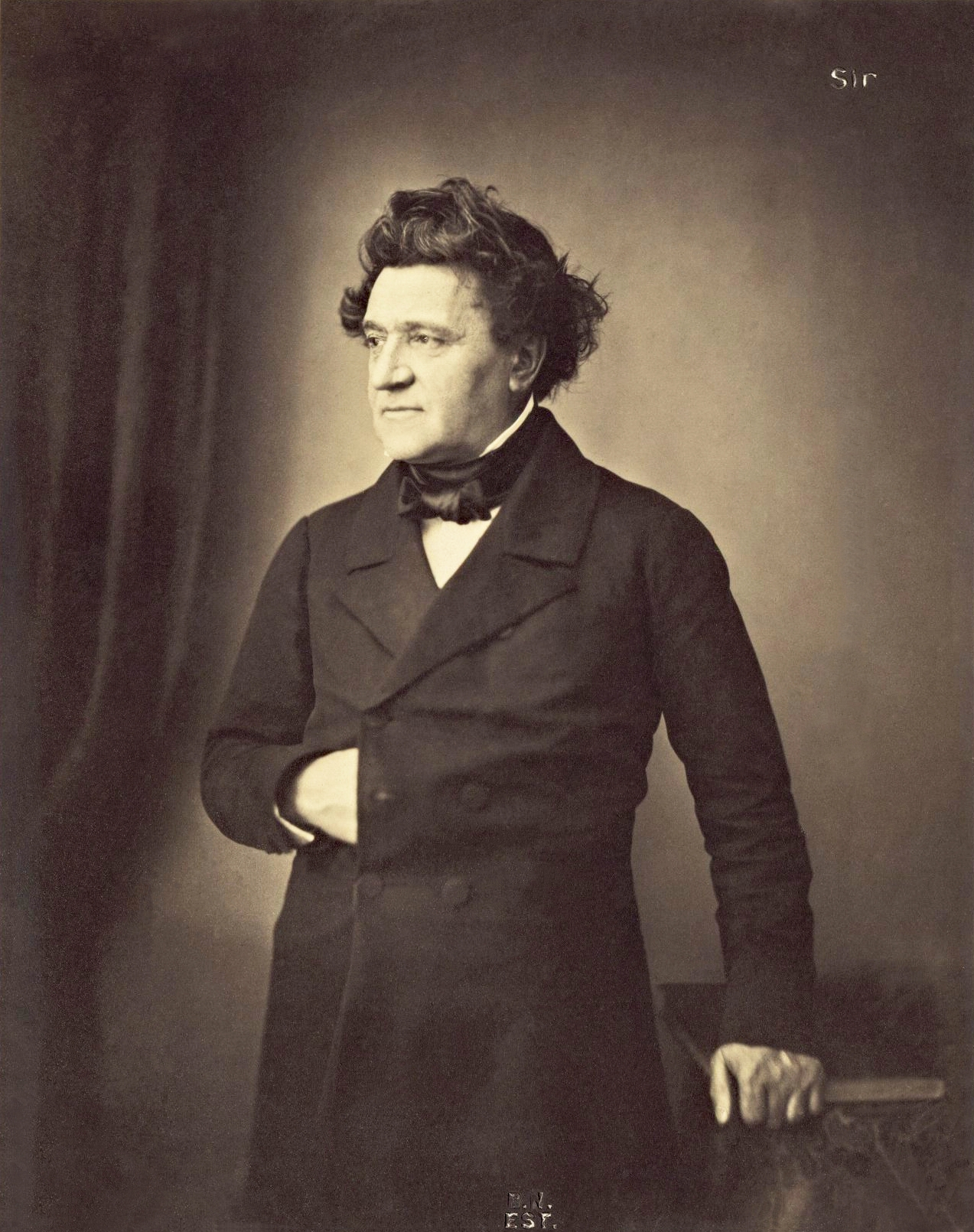
Paul Abadie

== Deaths ==
- January 8 – Eugenius Birch, English naval architect, engineer and noted pier builder (born 1818)
- February 10 – Richard Shackleton Pope, English architect working in Bristol (born 1793)
- March 26 – Edward Milner, English landscape architect (born 1819)
- July 27 – Frigyes Feszl, Hungarian architect, a significant figure in the romantic movement (born 1821)
- August 3 – Paul Abadie, French architect and building restorer (born 1812)
- October 19 – Major Rohde Hawkins, English school and church architect (born 1821)
