= Deak (disambiguation) =

Deák or Deak is a surname.

Deak may also refer to:

- Pavle Nestorović, also known as Deak, 17th century Austrian military officer
- William Sterling Parsons (1901–1953), nicknamed "Deak", American rear admiral, ordnance expert and weaponeer on the Enola Gay when it dropped the first atomic bomb, on Hiroshima
- Major Vic "Deak" Deakins, villain of the 1996 film Broken Arrow, played by John Travolta
- Deák Party, a Hungarian political party in the 1860s and 1870s led by Ferenc Deák
