= 1761 in architecture =

The year 1761 in architecture involved some significant architectural events and new buildings.

== Events ==
- Robert Adam and Sir William Chambers are jointly appointed Architect of the King's Works to King George III of Great Britain.

== Buildings and structures ==
=== Buildings completed ===
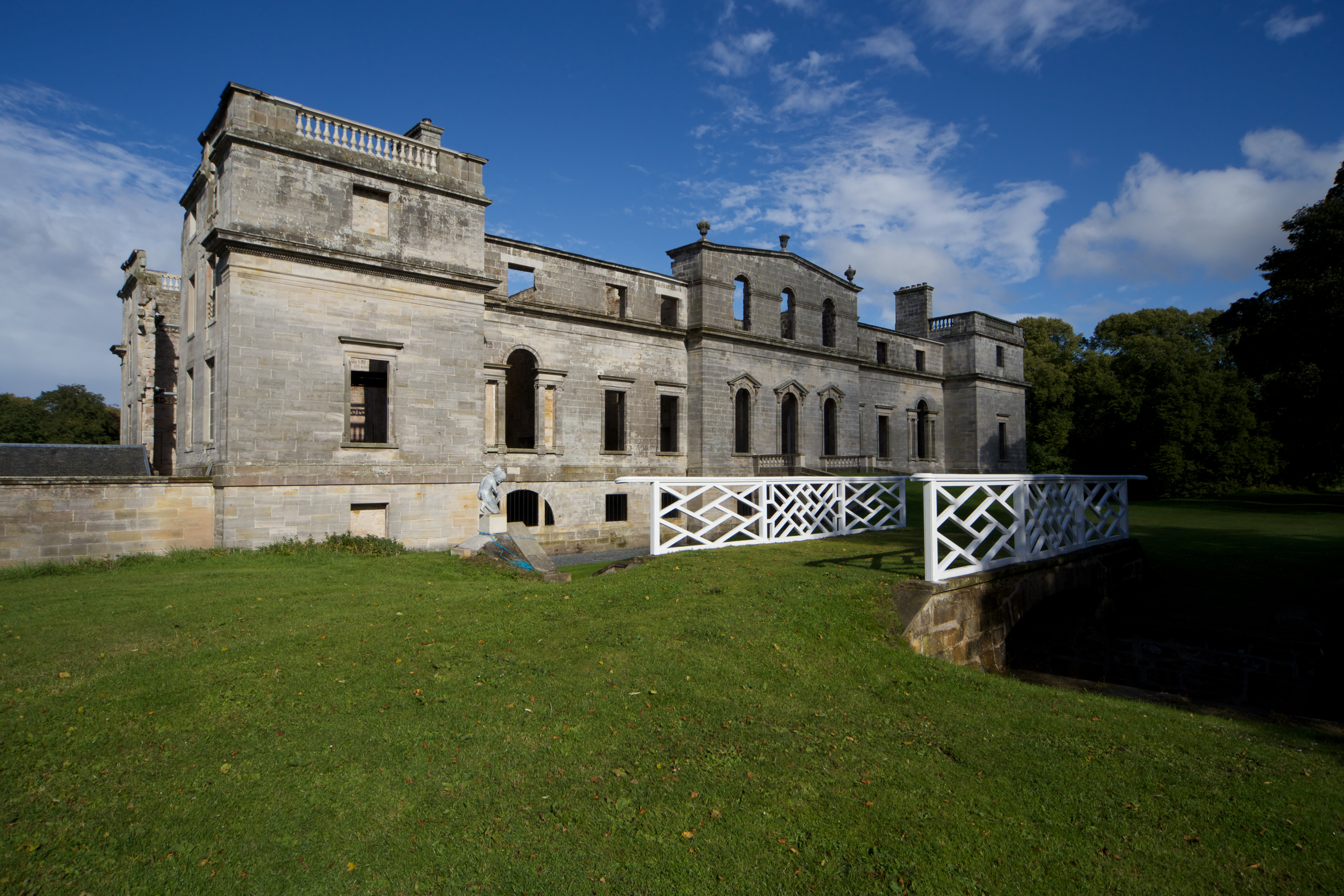
Penicuik House in Scotland

- Aina Mahal in Bhuj, Gujarat, India, built by Rao Lakhpatji.
- Christ Church (Cambridge, Massachusetts), designed by Peter Harrison, is completed.
- St. George Church, Moldavia, with a 99-foot (30-m) high bell tower once gilded in 18-carat gold.
- Penicuik House in Scotland built by Sir James Clerk, 3rd Baronet.
- Dunmore Pineapple in Scotland built.
- Église Saint-Georges de Châtenois completed

== Births ==
- June 7 – John Rennie the Elder, Scottish-born civil engineer (died 1821)
- August 19 – Andreyan Zakharov, Russian architect of the "Empire" style (died 1811)
- August 30 (bapt.) – Archibald Elliot, Scottish architect (died 1823)

== Deaths ==
- April 7 – Gabriele Valvassori, Italian architect (born 1683)
- date unknown – Domenico Cachia, Maltese master builder (born c. 1690)
