= 1888 in architecture =

The year 1888 in architecture involved some significant architectural events and new buildings.

== Events ==
- Roof and dome of Seville Cathedral collapse in an earthquake.
- Friedrich von Schmidt is ennobled.

== Buildings and structures ==
=== Buildings opened ===
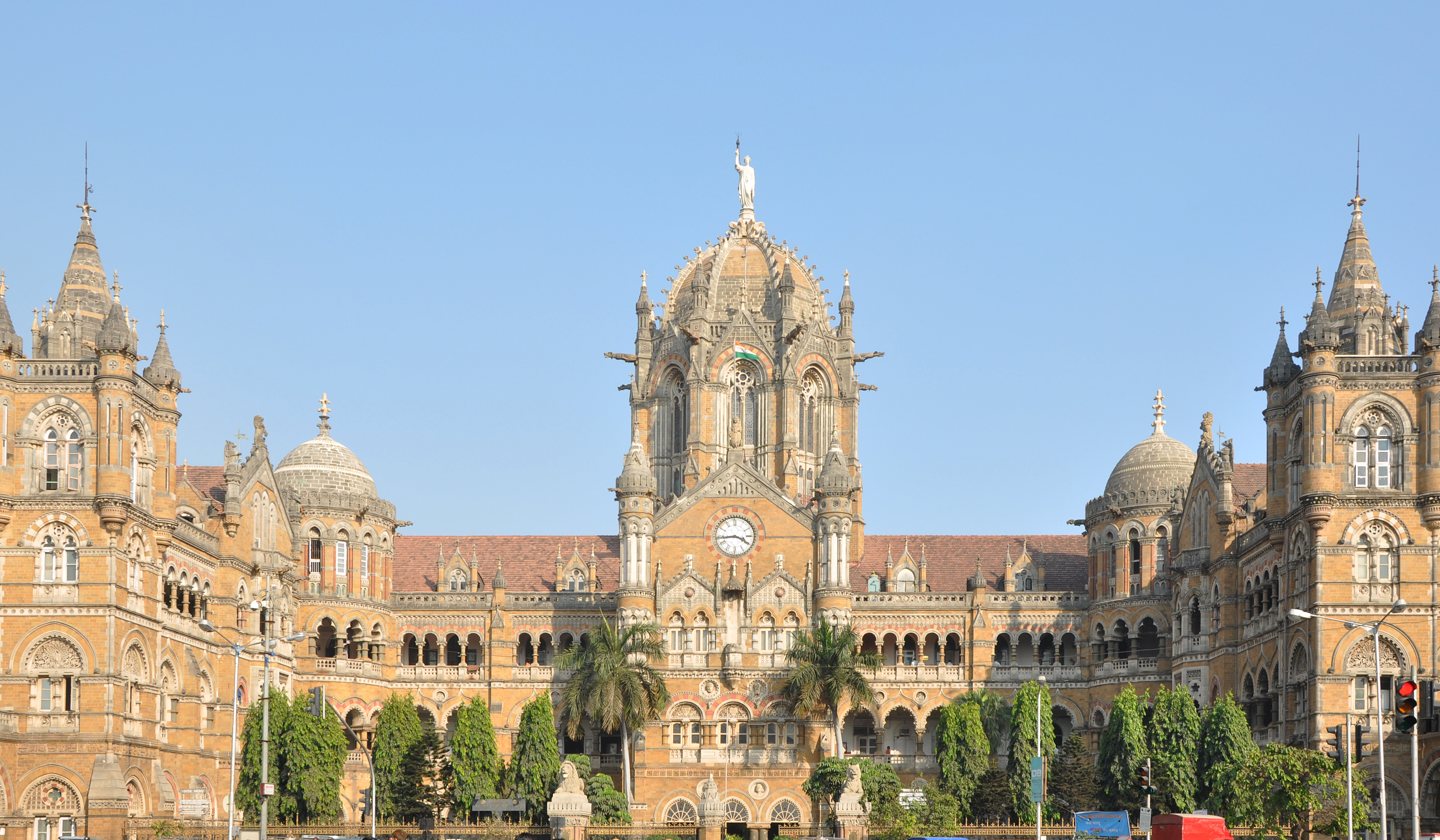
Victoria Terminus, Bombay

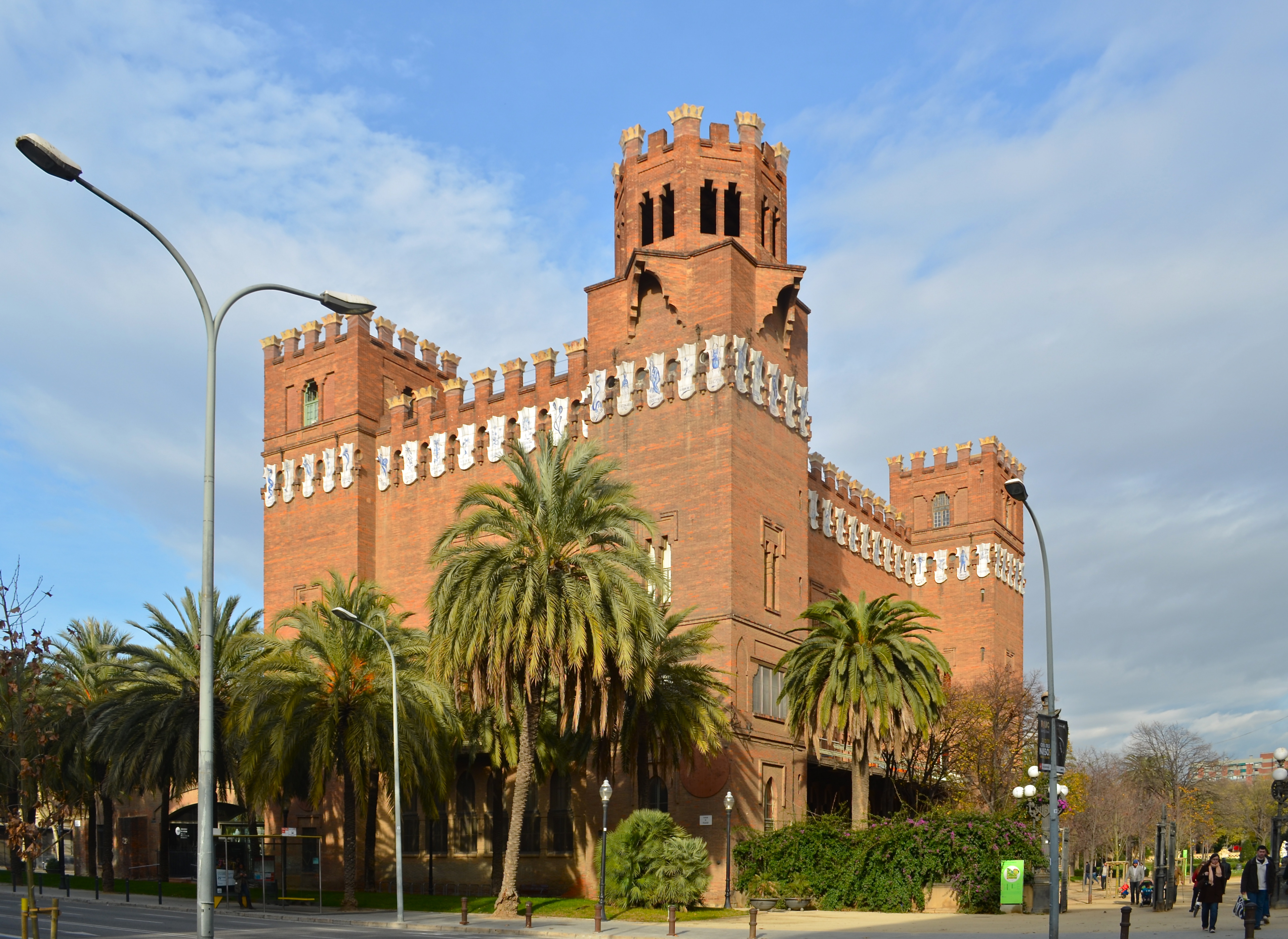
Castle of the Three Dragons, Barcelona

- January 5 – The Neues Deutsches Theater, Prague, designed by Fellner & Helmer with Baron Karl von Hasenauer and Alfons Wertmüller.
- April 11 – The Concertgebouw in Amsterdam, designed by Adolf Leonard van Gendt.
- May – Victoria Terminus station building, designed by Frederick William Stevens for the Great Indian Peninsula Railway, in Bombay's Bori Bunder district (modern-day: Chhatrapati Shivaji Terminus, Mumbai).
- August 12 – Plaza de Toros de El Bibio, Gijón, Asturias, Spain.
- August 17 – Castle of the Three Dragons for 1888 Barcelona Universal Exposition, Spain, designed by Lluís Domènech i Montaner.
- August 18 – Frankfurt (Main) Hauptbahnhof, designed by Hermann Eggert and Johann Wilhelm Schwedler.
- September 20 – Ghazanchetsots Cathedral (Armenian Apostolic Church), designed by Simon Ter-Hakobian(ts).
- October 2 – Annunciation Cathedral, Kharkiv, Ukraine, designed by Mikhail Lovtsov.
- October 4 – Princes Bridge, Melbourne, Australia, designed by John Harry Grainger.
- October 14 – Burgtheater, Ringstraße, Vienna, designed by Gottfried Semper and Baron Karl von Hasenauer.
- October 20 – Zappeion, Athens, designed by Theophil Hansen.
- Autumn – Georgia Institute of Technology, Atlanta, Georgia, USA (as the "Georgia School of Technology"), with Tech Tower used for classrooms.

=== Buildings completed ===
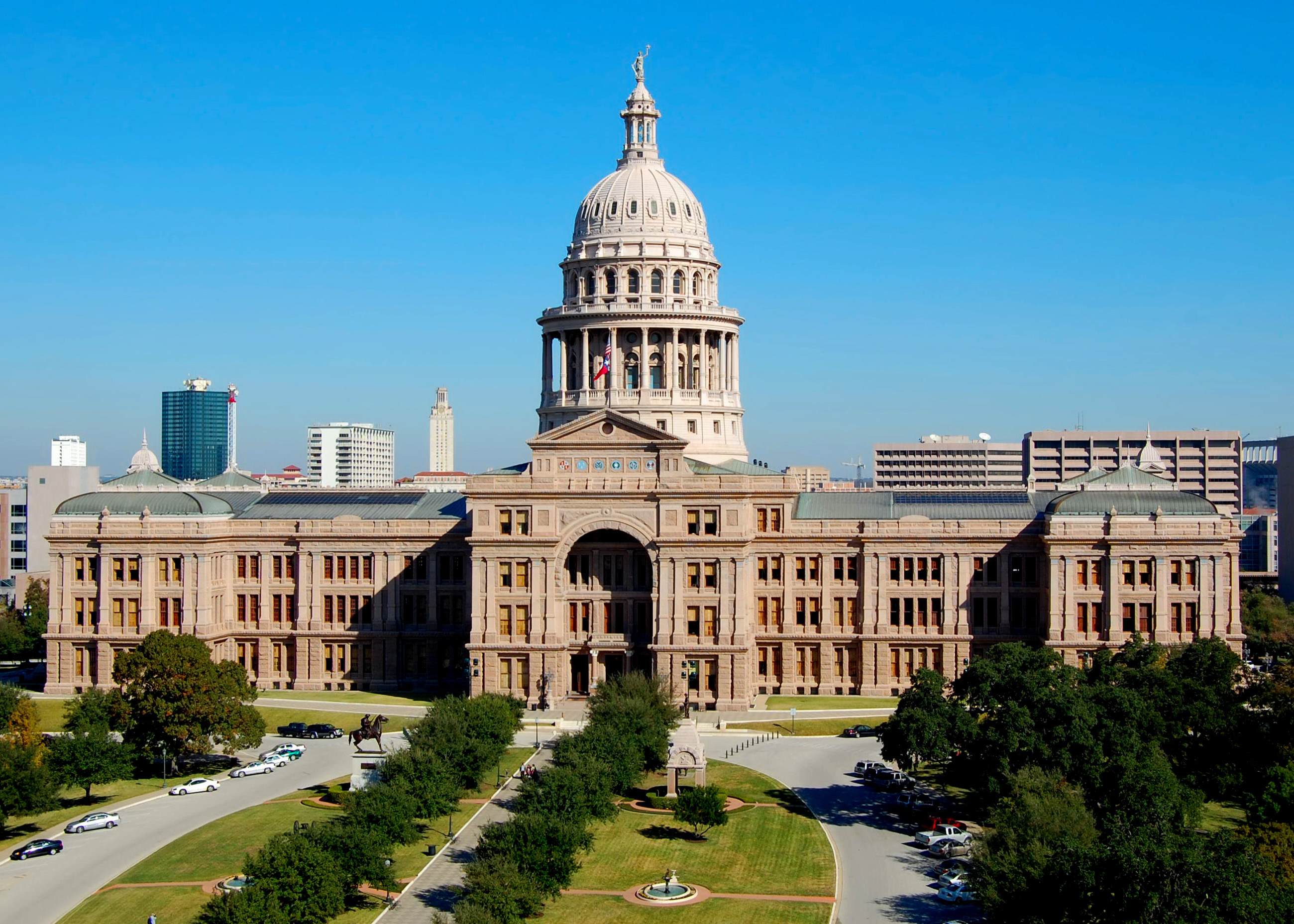
Texas State Capitol, Austin, Texas, USA

- St. Anne's Church, Bukit Mertajam, Malaysia.
- Cathedral of Melo, Uruguay.
- Conquest Plantation, Pointe Coupee, Louisiana, USA, built in Victorian style.
- Illinois State Capitol, Springfield, Illinois, USA.
- Ponce de León Hotel, St. Augustine, Florida, USA, designed by John Carrere and Thomas Hastings.
- Texas State Capitol, Austin, Texas, USA, designed by Elijah E. Myers.
- Allegheny County Courthouse, Pittsburgh, Pennsylvania, designed by H.H. Richardson.
- High Royds Hospital (West Riding Pauper Lunatic Asylum) near Leeds, England, designed by J. Vickers Edwards.
- Several buildings for the International Exhibition of Science, Art and Industry held in Glasgow, key architect being James Sellars.
- Elizabeth Plankinton House, Milwaukee, Wisconsin, USA, designed by E. Townsend Mix.
- Casino Notabile, Mdina, Malta, designed by Webster Paulson.

== Awards ==
- RIBA Royal Gold Medal – Theophil Freiherr von Hansen.
- Grand Prix de Rome, architecture: Albert Tournaire.

== Births ==
- January 20 – Léon Azéma, French architect (died 1978)
- February 6 - Romuald Gutt, Polish architect (died 1974)
- March 19 – Piero Portaluppi, Italian architect (died 1967)
- March 19 – Gordon Kaufmann, English-born US architect (died 1949)
- April 30 – Antonio Sant'Elia, Italian Futurist architectural theorist (killed in action 1916)
- June 24 – Gerrit Rietveld, Dutch furniture designer and architect (died 1964)
- August 26 – Gustavo R. Vincenti, Maltese architect and developer (died 1974)
- December 15 – Kaare Klint, Danish architect and furniture designer (died 1954)

== Deaths ==
- January 10 – James Campbell Walker, Scottish architect (born 1821)
- March 16 – Thomas Thomas, Welsh chapel architect and minister (born 1817)
- March 25 – William Eden Nesfield, English domestic revival architect (born 1835)
- August 5 – Edmund Wright, Australian architect, engineer and businessman (born 1824)
- November 25 – Christian Jank, scenic painter and stage designer, commissioned by Ludwig II of Bavaria to create concepts for architectural projects (born 1833)
