= 1821 in architecture =

The year 1821 in architecture involved some significant events.

== Buildings and structures ==
=== Buildings ===
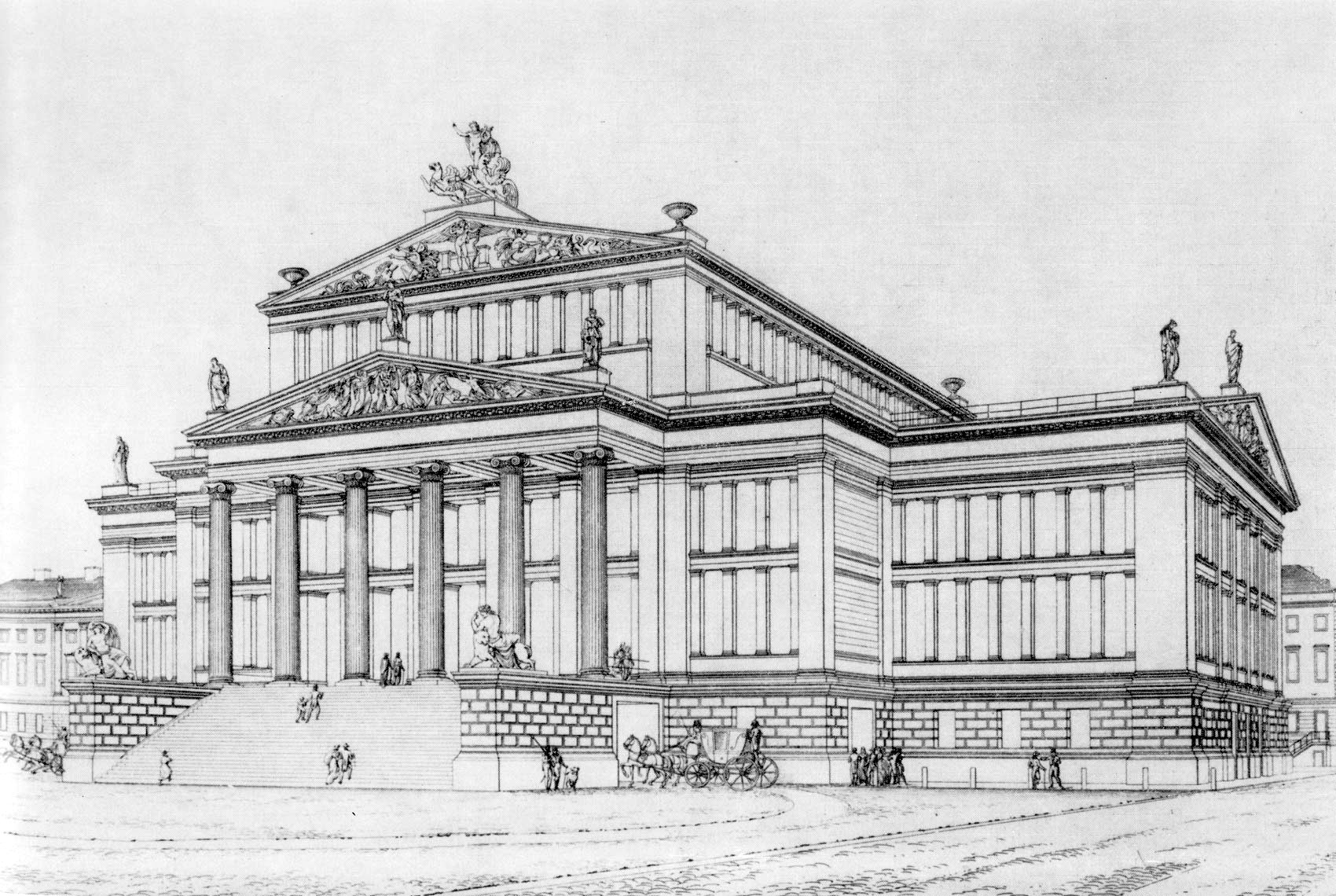
Karl Friedrich Schinkel's design for the Schauspielhaus Berlin

- The Schauspielhaus in Berlin (begun in 1819), designed by Karl Friedrich Schinkel, is completed.
- The Palais Leuchtenberg in Munich (begun in 1817), designed by Leo von Klenze, is completed.
- The Haymarket Theatre in London, designed by John Nash, is completed.
- Prince Ludwig I of Bavaria, wishing to build a monument to German unity and heroism (and the defeat of Napoleon), commissions Leo von Klenze to build a replica of the Parthenon on a bluff overlooking the Danube River near Regensburg, the Walhalla memorial.
- The Strasbourg Opera House is completed
- The Maitland Monument in Corfu, designed by George Whitmore, is built.

== Awards ==
- Grand Prix de Rome, architecture: Guillaume-Abel Blouet

== Births ==
- January 2 – Napoleon LeBrun, American architect (died 1901)
- February 4 – Major Rohde Hawkins, English school and church architect (died 1884)
- February 13 – John Turtle Wood, English architect (died 1890)
- February 20 – Frigyes Feszl, Hungarian architect (died 1884)
- April – Thomas Brunner, English-born architect working in New Zealand (died 1874)

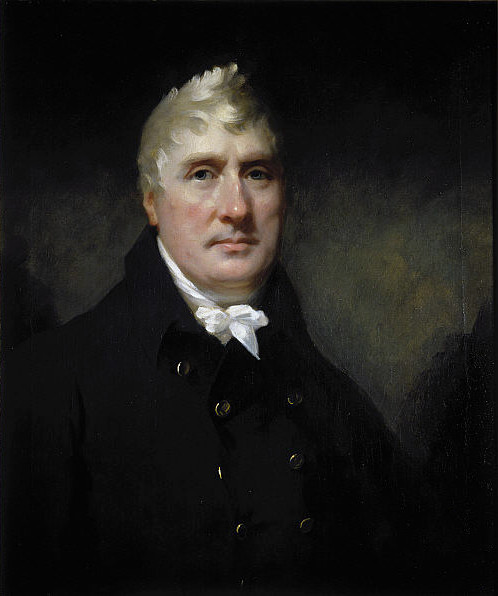
John Rennie the Elder

- April 11 – James Campbell Walker, Scottish architect (died 1888)
- July 4 – A. J. Humbert, English architect patronised by the royal family (died 1877)
- August 1 – James Gowans, Scottish architect (died 1890)
- November 26 – Charles Webb, English-born architect working in Victoria (Australia) (died 1898)
- Giuseppe Bonavia, Maltese architect (died 1885)
- John Elkington Gill, English architect working in Bath (died 1874)

== Deaths ==
- March 1 – John Yenn, English architect (born 1750)
- October 4 – John Rennie the Elder, Scottish-born civil engineer (born 1761)
