= Contigiani =

Contigiani is a surname. Notable people with the surname include:

- Luis Contigiani (born 1972), Argentine politician
- Raffaele Contigiani (1920–2008), Italian architect and painter
