= Hotel du Lac (disambiguation) =

Hotel du Lac is a 1984 novel by Anita Brookner.

Hotel du Lac may also refer to:

- Hotel du Lac (film), based on the novel
- Hôtel du Lac, Tunis, a hotel in Tunis, Tunisia
