= Deák =

Deák or Deak is a surname. Notable people with the surname include:

- Adrienn Henczné Deák (1890–1956), Hungarian painter
- Edit DeAk (1948–2017), née Deak, Hungarian-born American art critic and writer
- Edward Deak, professor of economics
- Ferenc Deák (politician) (1803–1876), Hungarian statesman and Minister of Justice
- Ferenc Deák (footballer) (1922–1998), Hungarian football player
- István Deák (1926–2023), Hungarian-born American historian, author and academic
- Jon Deak (born 1943), Hungarian-American double bassist and composer
- Kristóf Deák (born 1982), Hungarian film director, screenwriter, film producer and editor
- Ladislav Deák (1931–2011), Slovak historian
- László Deák (1891–1946), Hungarian army officer who served in World War I and World War II
- Nicholas Deak (1905–1985), Hungarian-American banker and OSS and CIA agent
- Stefan Deak (born 1991), Serbian footballer
- Tamás Deák (composer) (born 1927), composer and conductor for Cat City and Vízisí
- Tamás Deák (born 1976), stage name Speak, Hungarian rapper, model and actor
- Zsombor Deak (born 1989), Romanian triathlete

== See also ==
- Marcell Deák-Nagy (born 1992), Hungarian sprinter who specialises in the 200 and 400 metres
