= City of Westminster Magistrates' Court =

Magistrates' court in London, England

Coordinates: 51.49500°N 0.12872°W

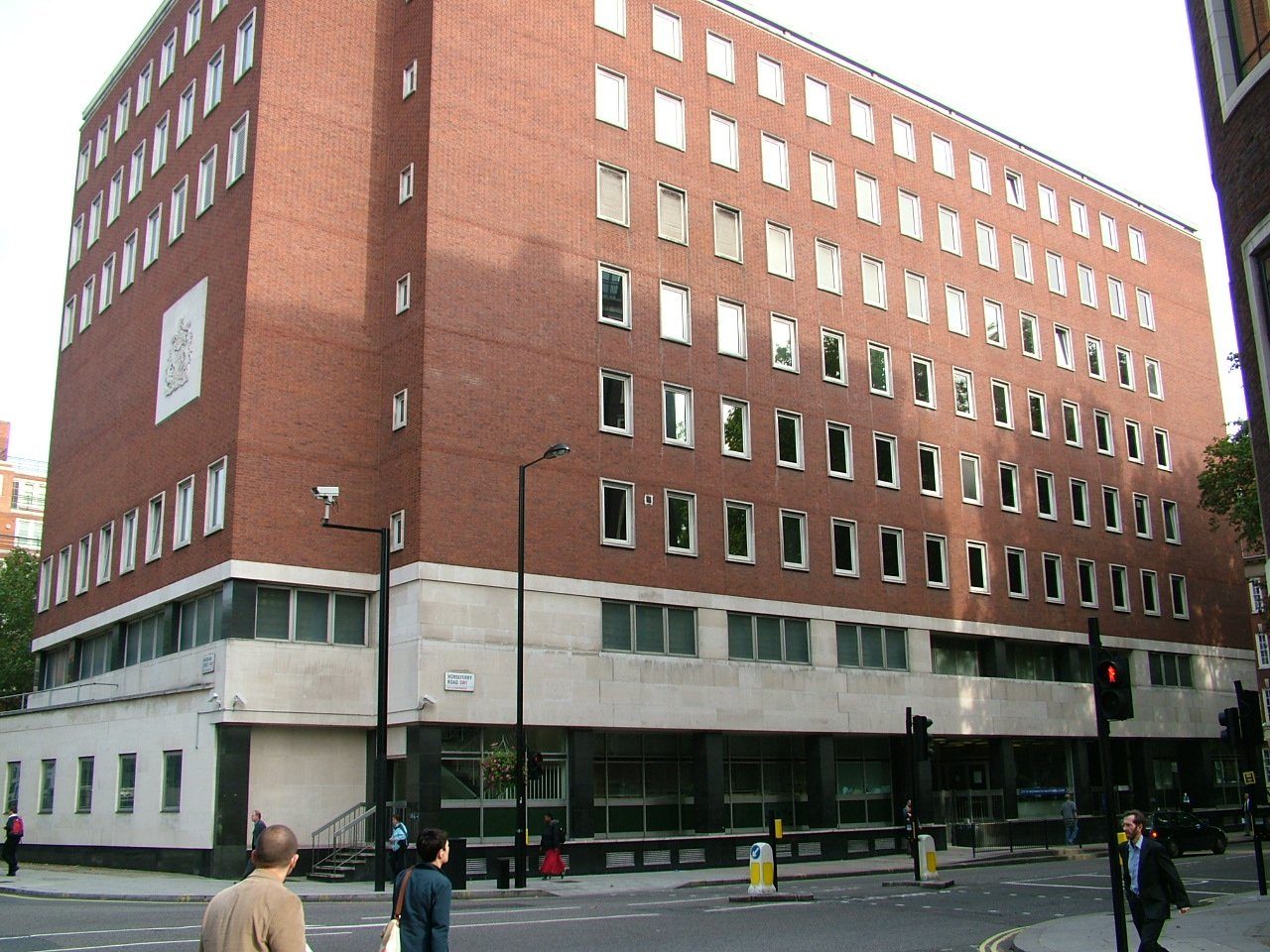
City of Westminster Magistrates' Court, facing south across Horseferry Road

The City of Westminster Magistrates' Court was a magistrates' court located at 70 Horseferry Road, in the City of Westminster, London. It was originally called Horseferry Road Magistrates' Court, after the road in which it was sited. However, it was renamed in July 2006 following the closure of Bow Street Magistrates' Court. It served as the court where the Chief Magistrate of England and Wales sat, and all extradition and terrorism-related cases passed through the court. The court closed permanently on 22 September 2011, and was replaced on 27 September 2011 with Westminster Magistrates' Court, built on the site of Marylebone Magistrates' Court at 181 Marylebone Road.

The court pictured has since been demolished, and replaced with a development of flats.

== History ==
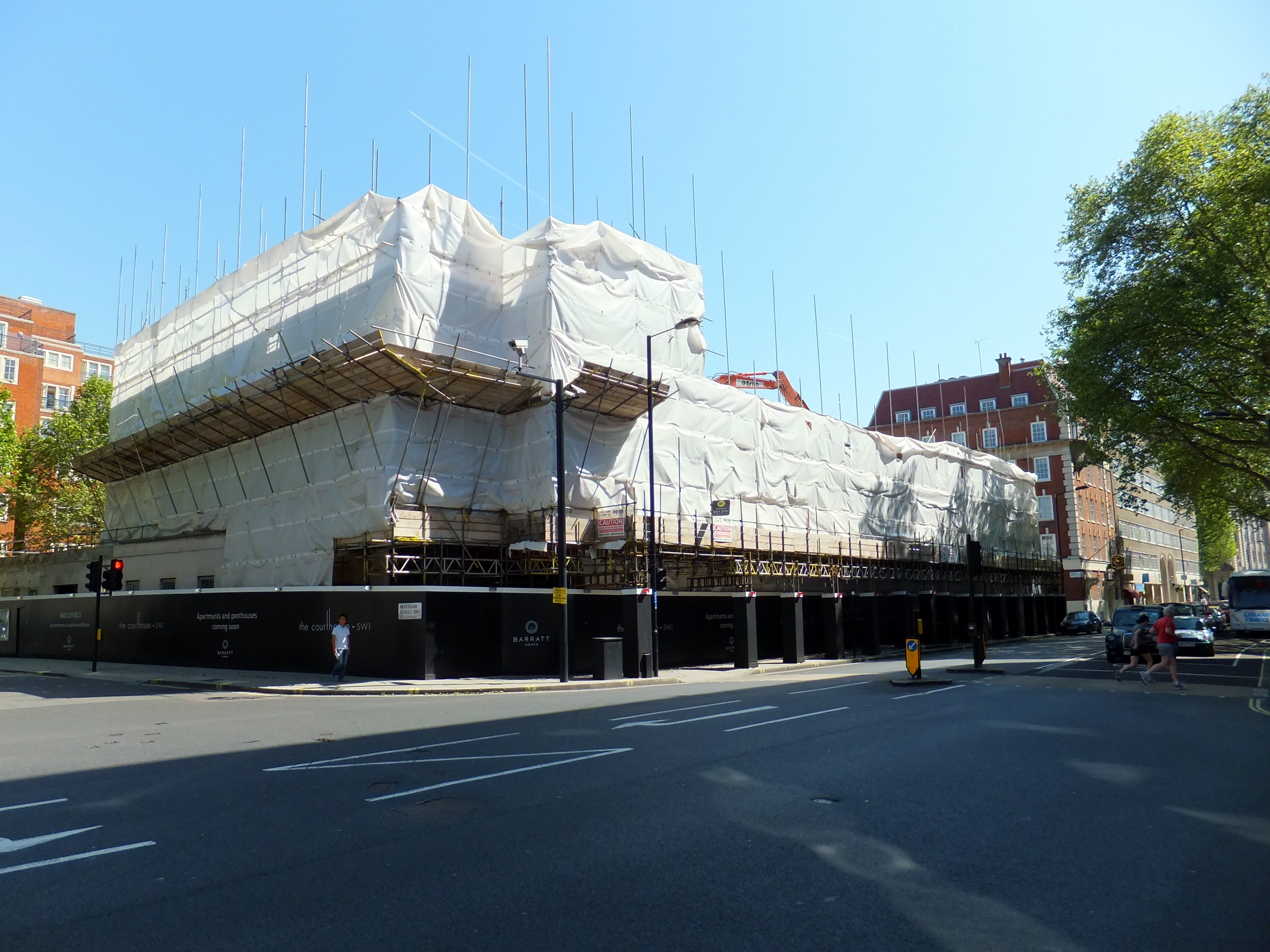
Demolition of the Magistrates' Court in 2012

The court building, designed by C. A. Legerton and opened in 1974, was functional and "of minimal personality and minimal expression of function and purpose", according to Pevsner. It was opened as one of a series of three larger court houses, with the others at Camberwell Green and Highbury Corner. It had four courtrooms as opened and a further two were added later. The central location and proximity to New Scotland Yard caused the court to be involved in a number of high-profile cases.
