= Château et cimetière de Châtenois =

Ruined castle and cemetery in France

Coordinates: 48.2696°N 7.3966°E

The Château et cimetière de Châtenois is a ruined castle and a cemetery in the commune of Châtenois, in the department of Bas-Rhin, Alsace, France. It is a listed historical monument since 1932.

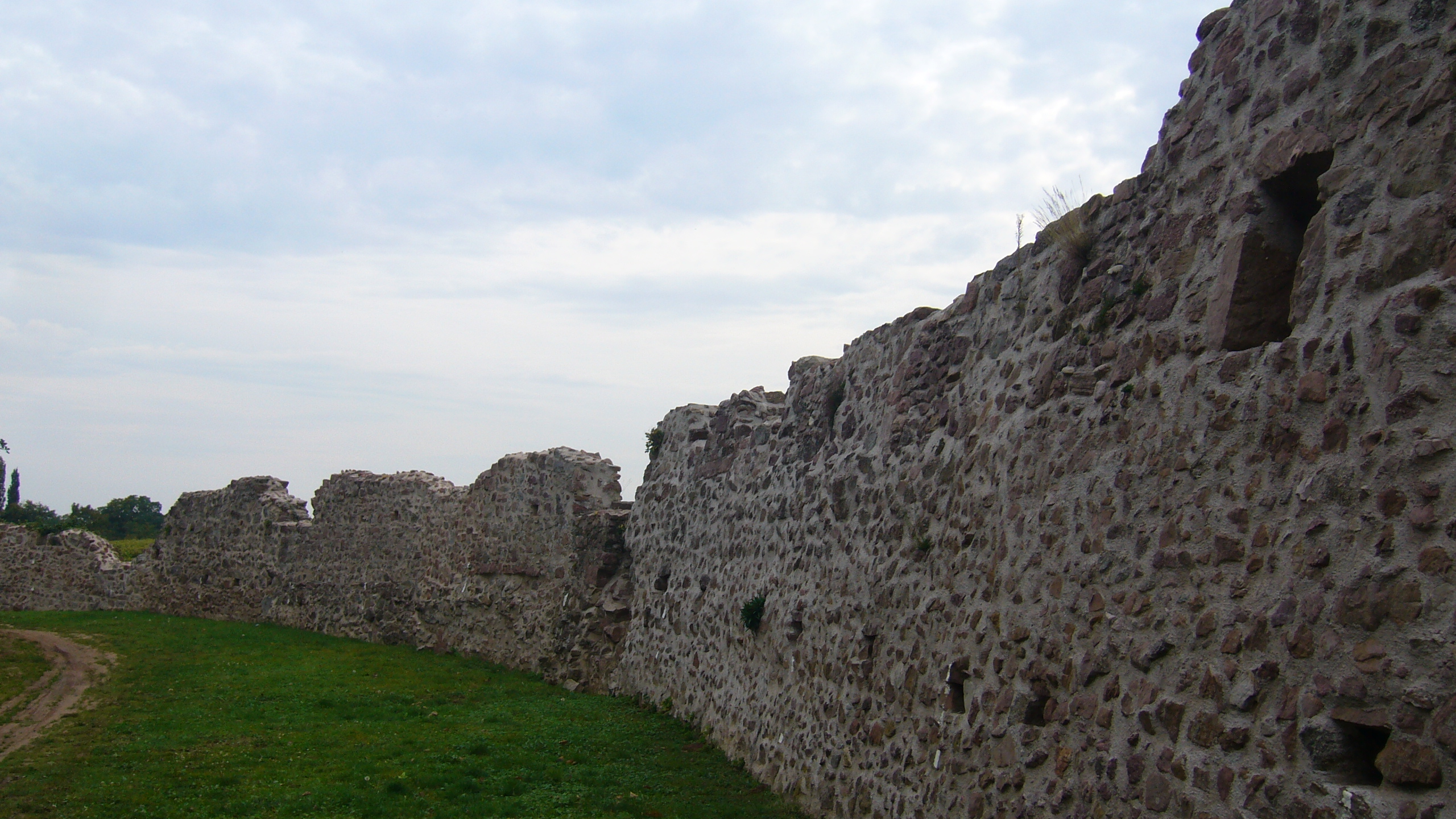
Château et cimetière de Châtenois
