= Châtenois, Bas-Rhin =

Châtenois Keschteholz
- Commune
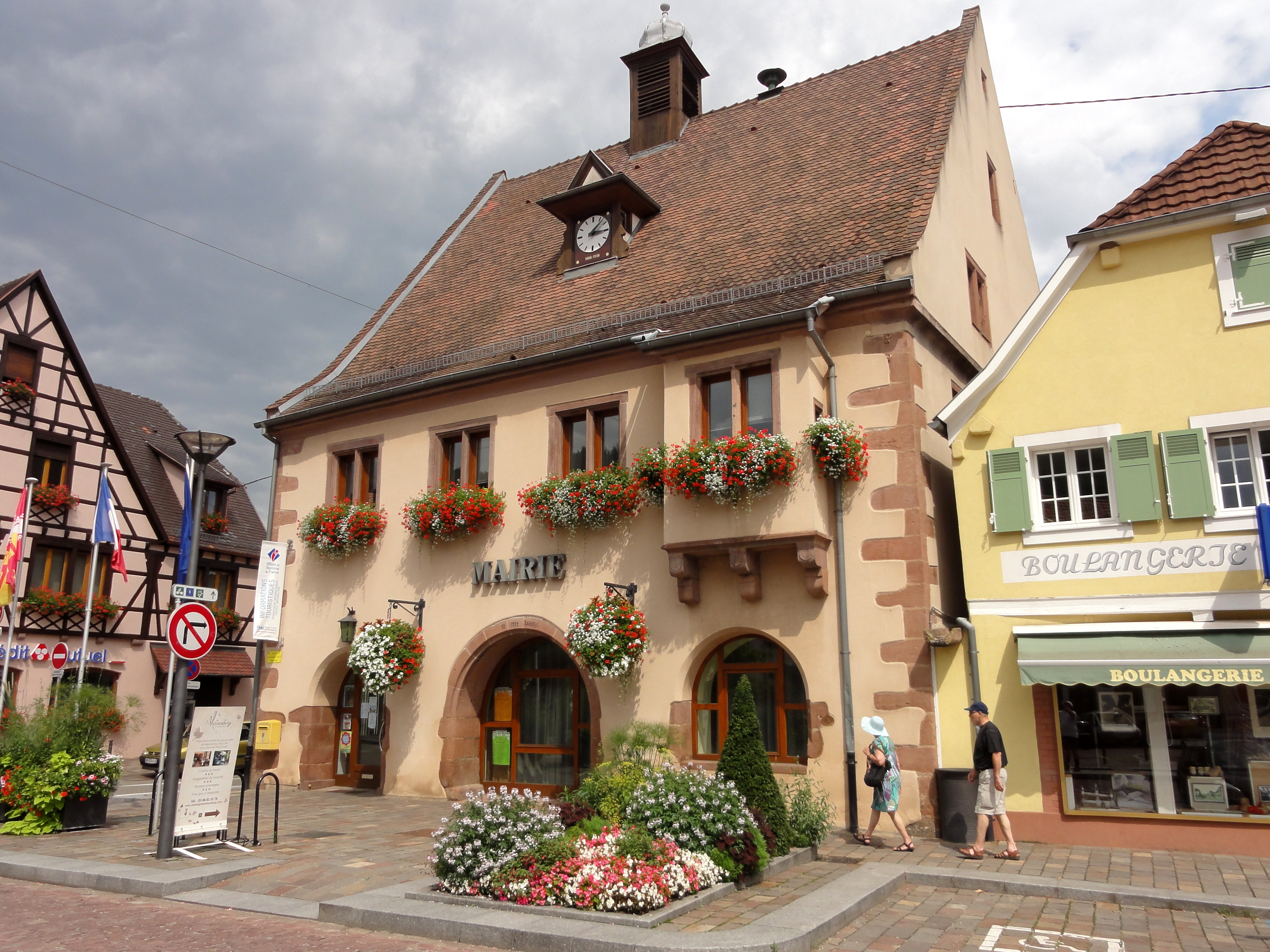
- The town hall in Châtenois

- Coat of arms
- Location of Châtenois
- Location within France Location within Grand Est
- Coordinates: 48°16′21″N 7°24′05″E
- Country: France
- Region: Grand Est
- Department: Bas-Rhin
- Arrondissement: Sélestat-Erstein
- Canton: Sélestat
- Intercommunality: Sélestat

Government
  - Mayor (2020–2026): Luc Adoneth
- Area^{1}: 14.57 km^{2} (5.63 sq mi)
- Highest elevation: 525 m (1,722 ft)
- Lowest elevation: 179 m (587 ft)
- Population (2023): 4,294
  - Density: 294.7/km^{2} (763.3/sq mi)
- Time zone: UTC+01:00 (CET)
  - Summer (DST): UTC+02:00 (CEST)
- INSEE/Postal code: 67073 /67730
- ^{1} French Land Register data, which excludes lakes, ponds, glaciers > 1 km^{2} (0.386 sq mi or 247 acres) and river estuaries.

Châtenois (French pronunciation: [ʃatnwa]; German: Kestenholz; Alsatian: Keschtaholz) is a commune in the Bas-Rhin department in Alsace in north-eastern France.

The small town is notable for its architectural heritage, among which the church Église Saint-Georges, the medieval, timber-framed "witch tower" (Tour des sorcières), the ancient town hall, etc.

== Population ==
Historical population
Year	Pop.	±% p.a.
1968	2,798	—
1975	2,954	+0.78%
1982	3,005	+0.24%
1990	3,020	+0.06%
1999	3,373	+1.24%
2007	3,876	+1.75%
2012	3,992	+0.59%
2017	4,188	+0.96%
2023	4,294	+0.42%
Source: INSEE

== See also ==
- Communes of the Bas-Rhin department
- Château et cimetière de Châtenois
