= Frigyes Feszl =

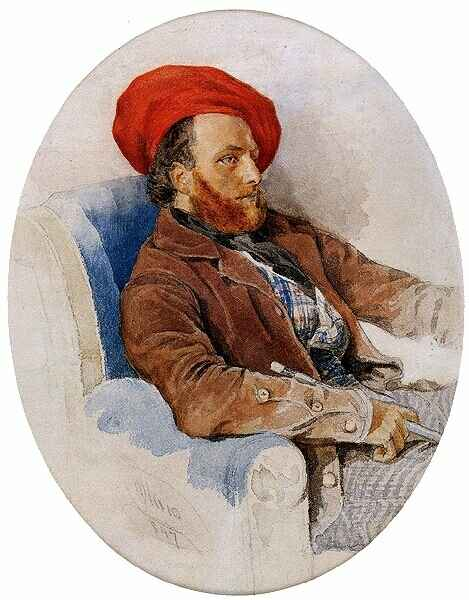
Portrait of Frigyes Feszl by Károly Sterio, 1847

Frigyes Feszl (February 20, 1821 – July 25, 1884) was an architect and a significant figure in the Hungarian romantic movement. (Note: edited by Kinga Frojimovics, Géza Komoróczy (January 1999). Jewish Budapest: Monuments, Rites, History. ISBN 9789639116375.)

== Life ==
Born in Pest, Hungary, into a family of German origin, Feszl's father was a master wood carver. He was the fifth of fourteen children and two of his brothers, József (1819–1866) and János (1822–1852) also became architects.

Feszl attended the Piarist gymnasium between 1830 and 1835, subsequently studying under architect József Hild. In 1839 he was able to travel overseas and with his brother József enrolled in the Fine Arts Academy in Munich.

He married Regina Hoffman (d. 1851) in 1849 who bore him two children, Regina (1849–1870) and Frigyes (1850-1910). Feszl remarried after his first wife's death, in 1858 he married Vilma Quandt (1827–1902).

Between 1861 and 1865 he studied painting in Paris and became a member of the architect's guild in 1866. He died in Budapest, aged 63.

== Major works ==
1845

- Competition design for the Hungarian Parliament, Pest

1846-49

- New Servite Church, Therese town, Pest
- V. Nador street no 22, Oszvald House, Pest
- V. Vaci Street 57, Balassovits House, Pest
- Mor Baths, Pest

1851-53

- Luczenbacher chapel, Szob
- Budakeszi street 71, Kochmeister villa, Pest
- Heckenaszt villa, Pilismarot
- Kalvin Square Reformation Church, Budapest
- V. Sas Street, Frolich House, Pest

1854-1863

- Inner City Parish Church, Pest (destroyed)
- Vigadó Concert Hall, Pest
- Dohány Street Synagogue, Pest
- Summer Theatre, Pest (destroyed)

1872-74

- Boys School and Priest home, VI. Nagymezo street 1., Budapest
- Danube and Castle Hill replanning, Buda
- Primary schools: Bp., VI. Szív u. 19-21.; Bp., VII. Wesselényi u. 52.; Bp., VIII. Dankó u. 31.; Bp., X. Szent László tér 34.
- Old Exhibition Hall, Pest.

1876-1884

- Deák mausoleum and statue plans
- Bp., Andrassy avenue 99, Mayer House

(works in collaboration with others: Former Capucine Church, Water town (St Elizabeth Parish Church) and Abbey, Christine Town tunnel entrance, with Jozsef Pan: former London Hotel in the inner city.)
