= Edward Deak =

Dr. Edward Deak is the former Roger M. Lynch Professor of Economics and retired Chair of the Department of Economics at Fairfield University in Fairfield, Connecticut. Dr. Deak is also a Board Member and the Connecticut Forecast Manager for the New England Economic Partnership.

In 2007, Connecticut Governor M. Jodi Rell named Dr. Deak to the Governor's Economic Advisory Council, an eight-member panel of leading economists from throughout the state to advise her on key issues affecting the Connecticut economy.

Dr. Deak published a book, The Economics of e-Commerce and the Internet (Southwestern Thomson Learning 2003), in which he tackles misconceptions about the economics of the Internet.

He testified on the Y2K problem before the U.S. Senate Committee on Banking, Housing and Urban Affairs Subcommittee on Financial Services and Technology, and was the Governor's appointee and chair to the Connecticut Economic Conference Board.

Dr. Deak earned his bachelor's, master's, and doctorate in economics from the University of Connecticut.

== Books ==
- The Economics of e-Commerce and the Internet, (Southwestern Thomson Learning, 2003)
- Environmental Factors in Transportation Planning, (1972)

He was also an official advisor to Barack Obama on the economy circa 2009.
