= Église Saint-Georges de Châtenois =

Coordinates: 48°16′09″N 7°23′51″E

Église Saint-Georges
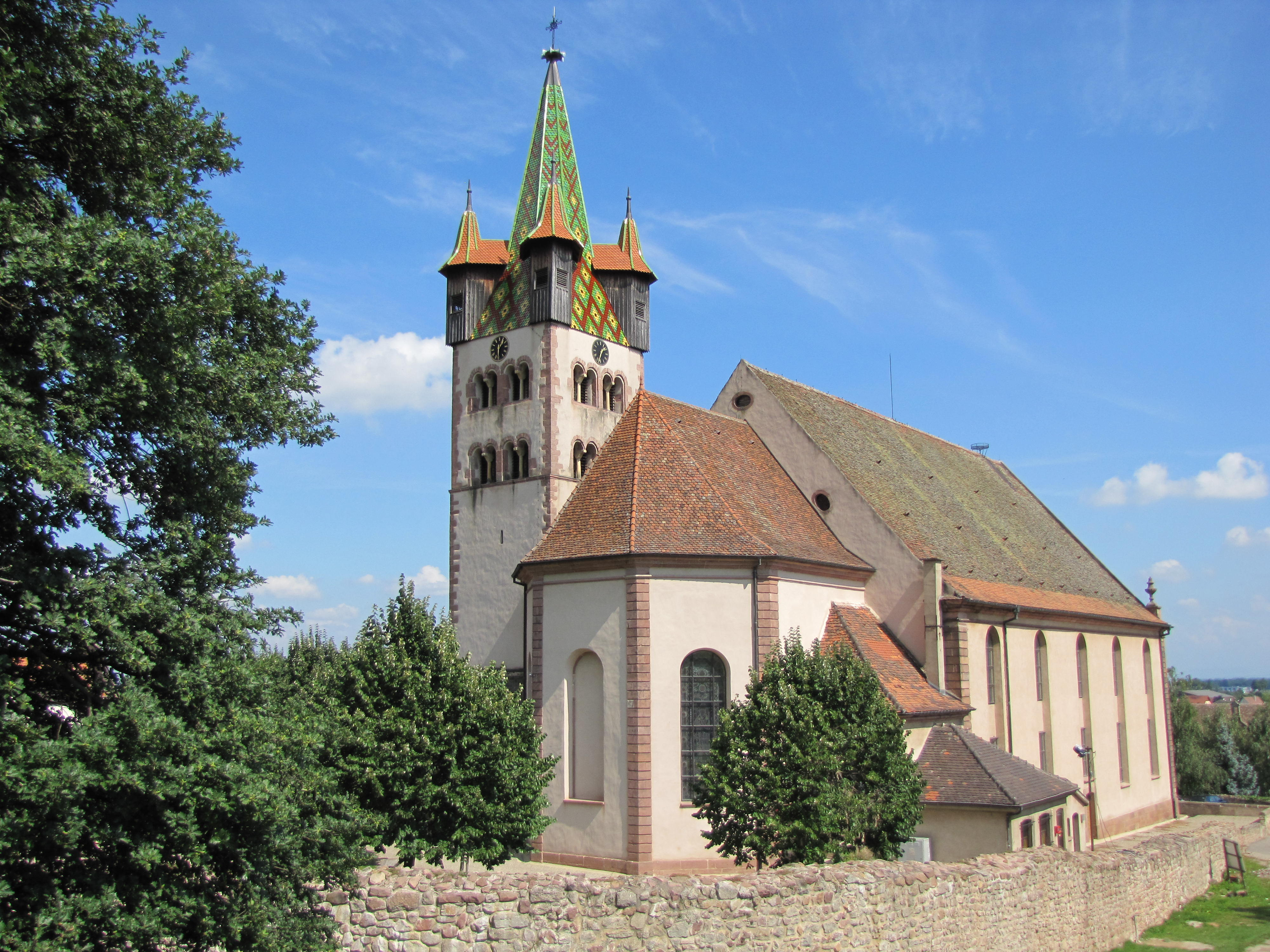
- Église Saint-Georges
- Location: Châtenois, Bas-Rhin
- Country: France
- Denomination: Catholic
- Website: https://www.paroissesaintbenoit.com/Chatenois_r10.html

History
- Dedication: Saint George

Architecture
- Heritage designation: Monument historique
- Designated: 22 August 1901 (Romanesque belltower); 30 October 1990 (Baroque church building)
- Style: Romanesque; Baroque; Classical

Administration
- Archdiocese: Strasbourg
- Parish: Communauté de paroisses Saint Benoît

Église Saint-Georges de Châtenois is the Catholic parish church of Châtenois, in the Bas-Rhin department of France. The current church was built from 1759 until 1761 by the local architect Martin Dorgler, but retains a Romanesque steeple from the 12th century, crowned with a spire from 1525. It became a registered Monument historique in 1901.

The church houses some notable works of art, classified as Monument historique, among which are two 16th-century polychrome wooden Renaissance reliefs of the Nativity and the Assumption of Mary, and a 1765 pipe organ by Johann Andreas Silbermann.

== Gallery ==
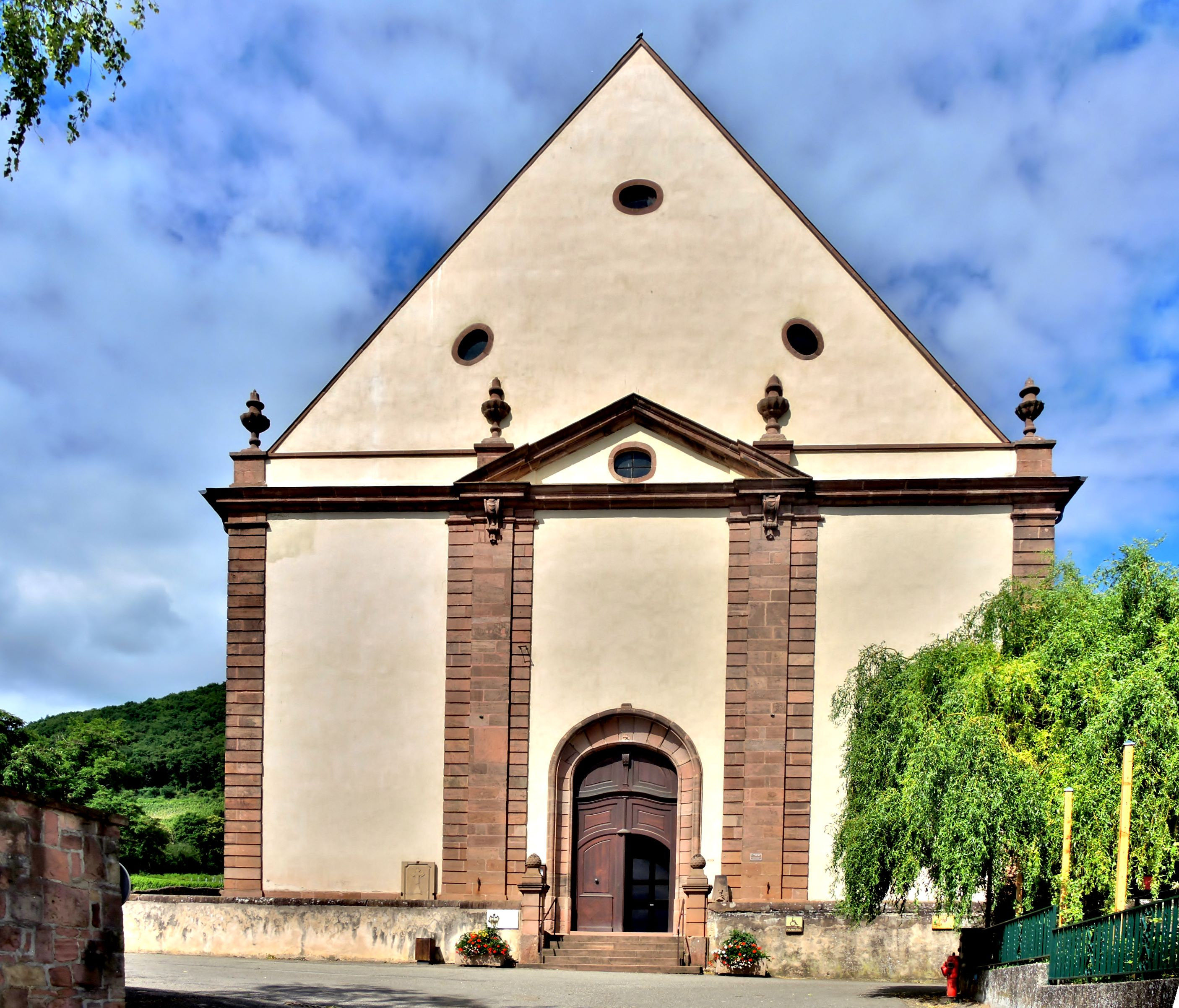
Main portal

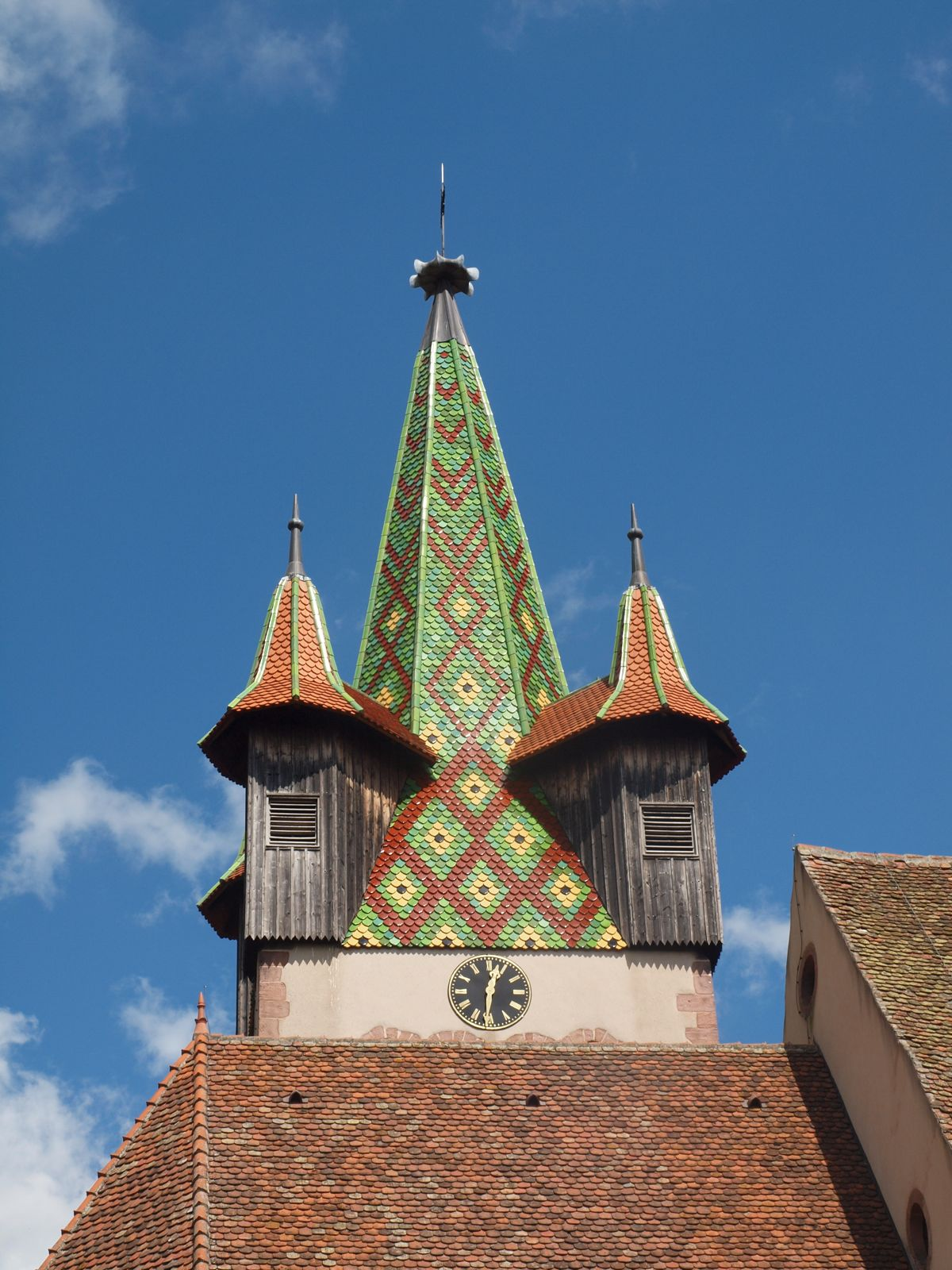
Roof and spire

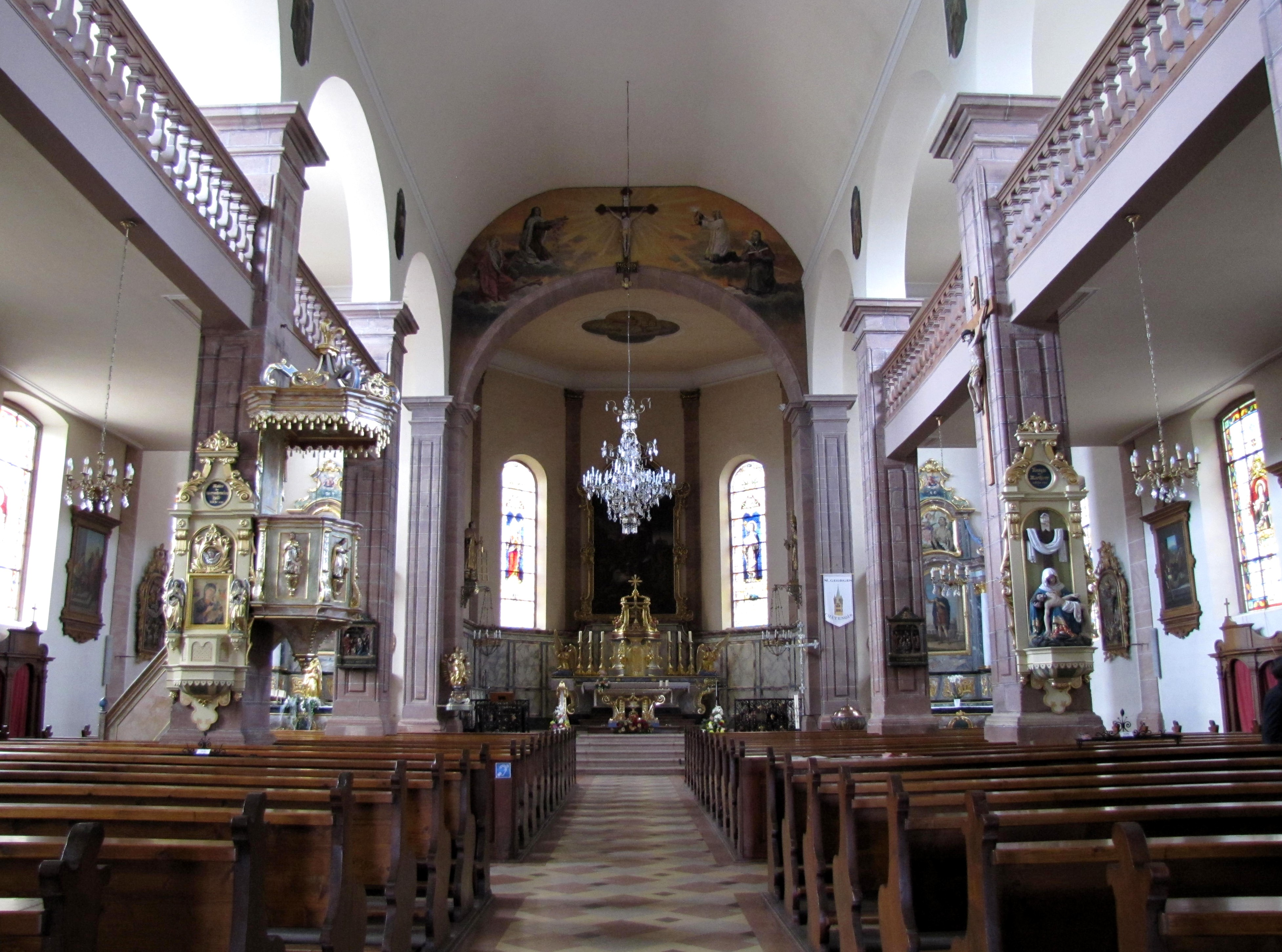
Inside, looking east

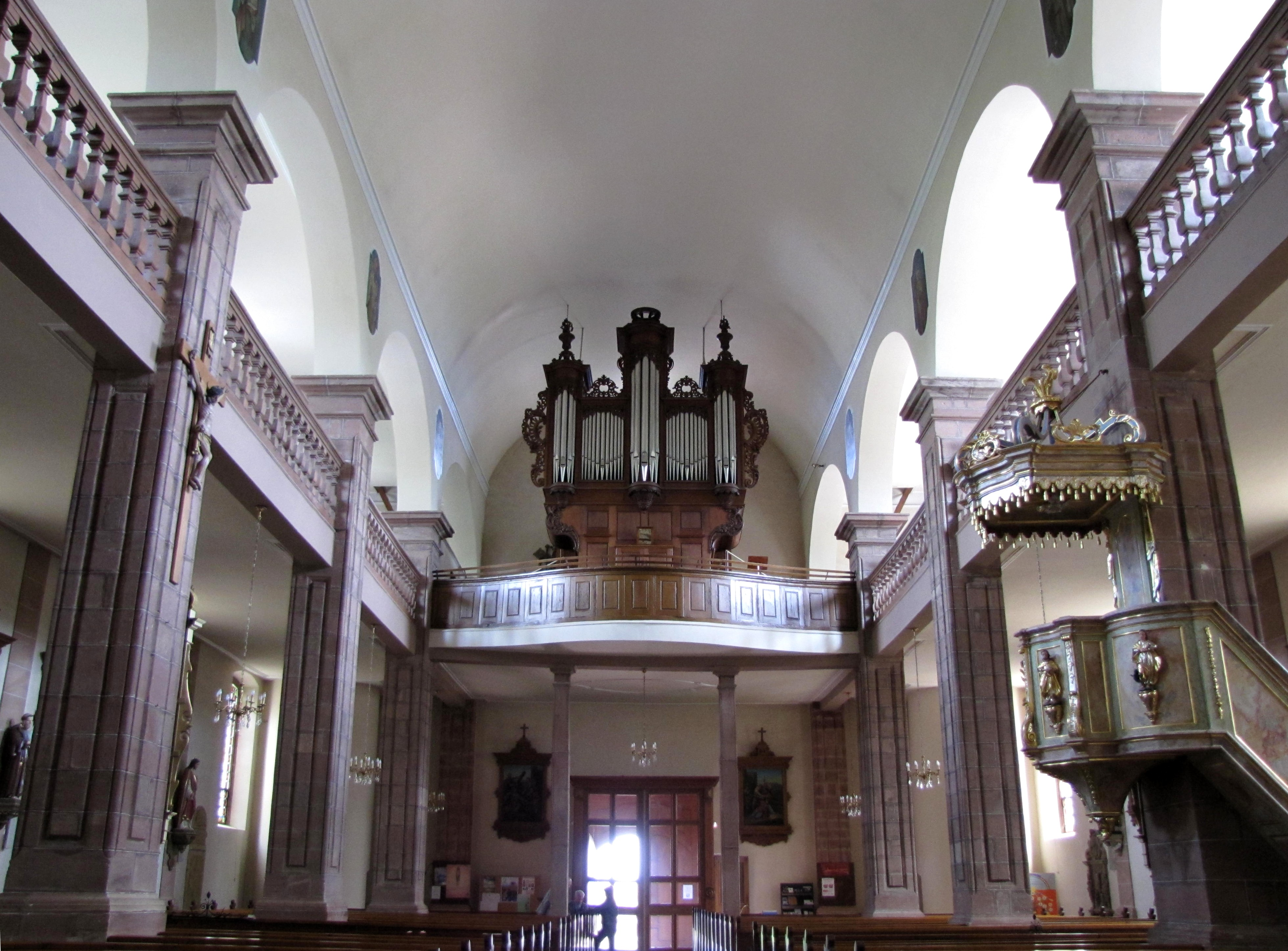
Inside, looking west

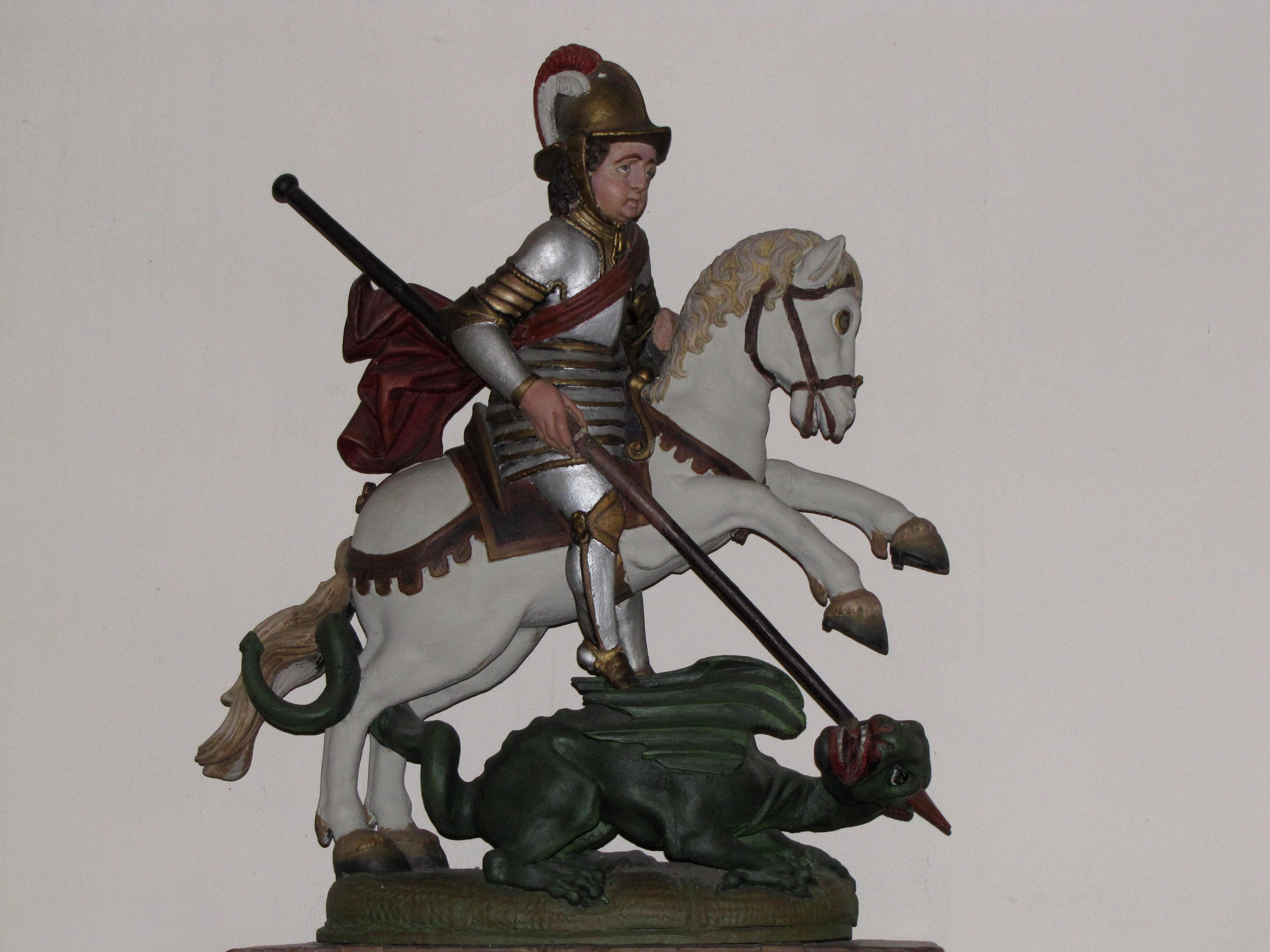
Statue of Saint George and the Dragon (17th century)

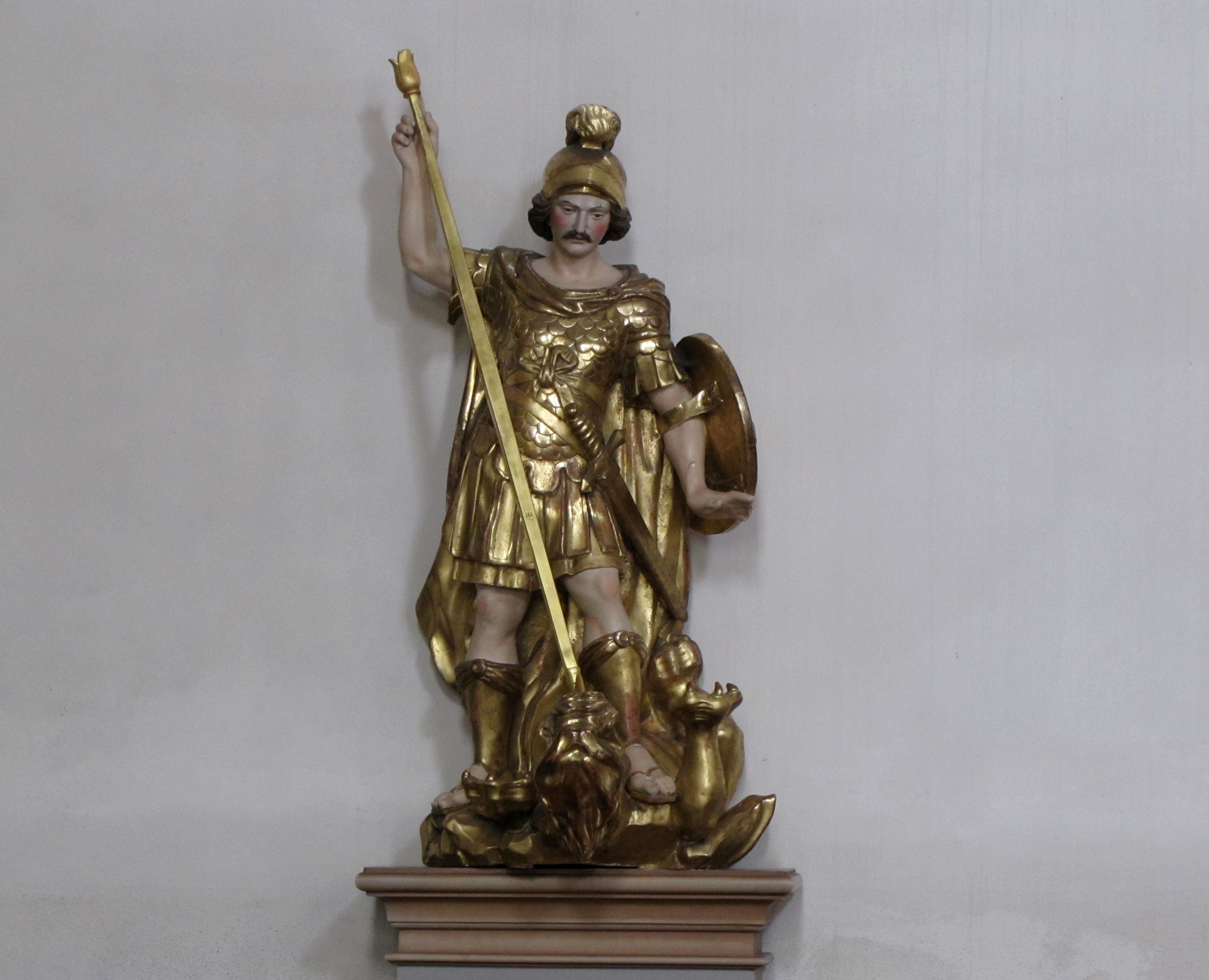
Statue of Saint George and the Dragon (18th century)
