= Károly Sterio =

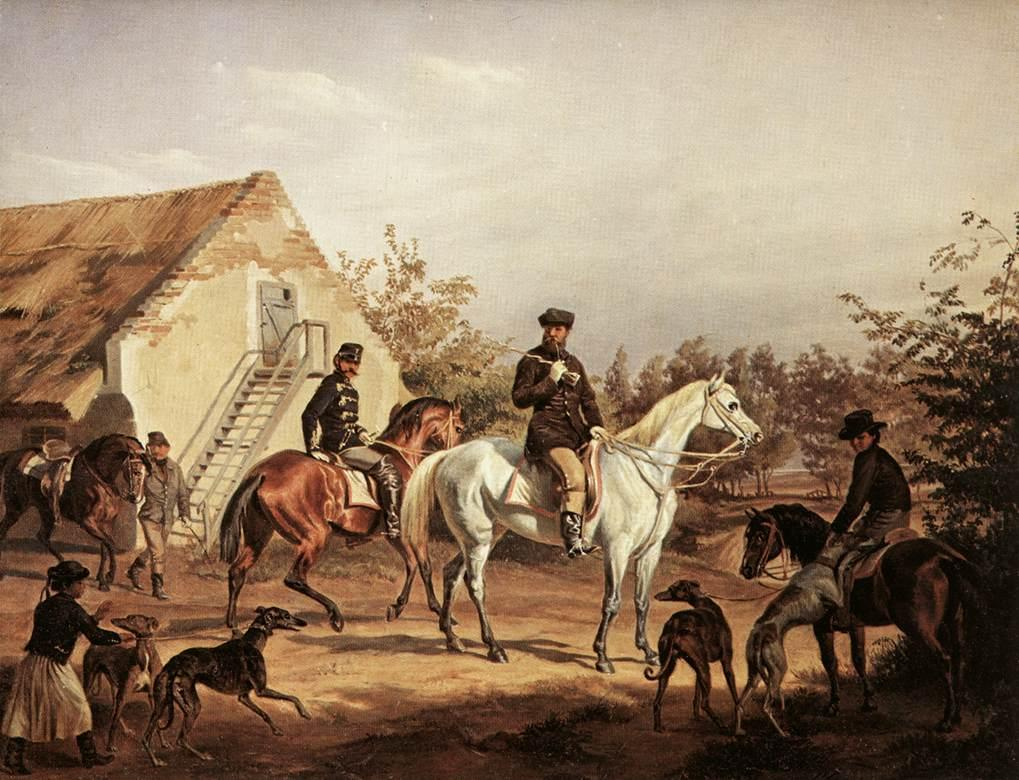
Indulás a vadászatra

Károly Sterio (1821 – 1862) was a Hungarian painter. His artwork is in the permanent collections of the Hungarian National Gallery in Budapest and the Albertina museum in Vienna, Austria.
