= Raffaele Contigiani =

Italian architect and painter

- Born: 1920; Turin, Italy
- Died: 2008 (aged 87–88)
- Education: Faculty of Architecture at Rome
- Occupation: Architect
- Buildings: Hotel du Lac, Tunis

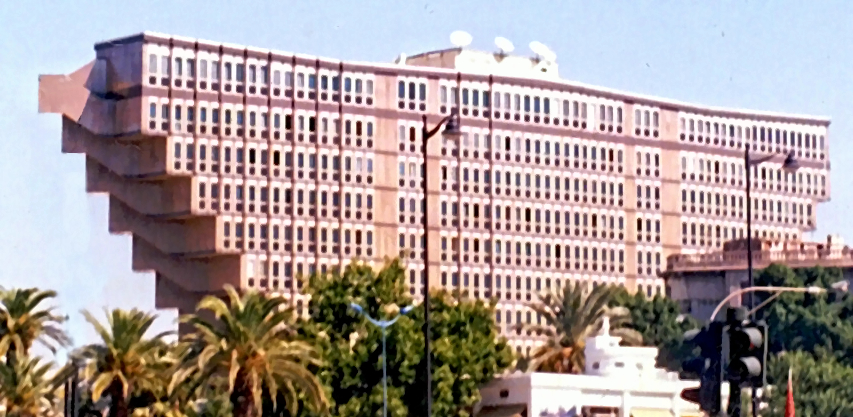
Hotel du Lac

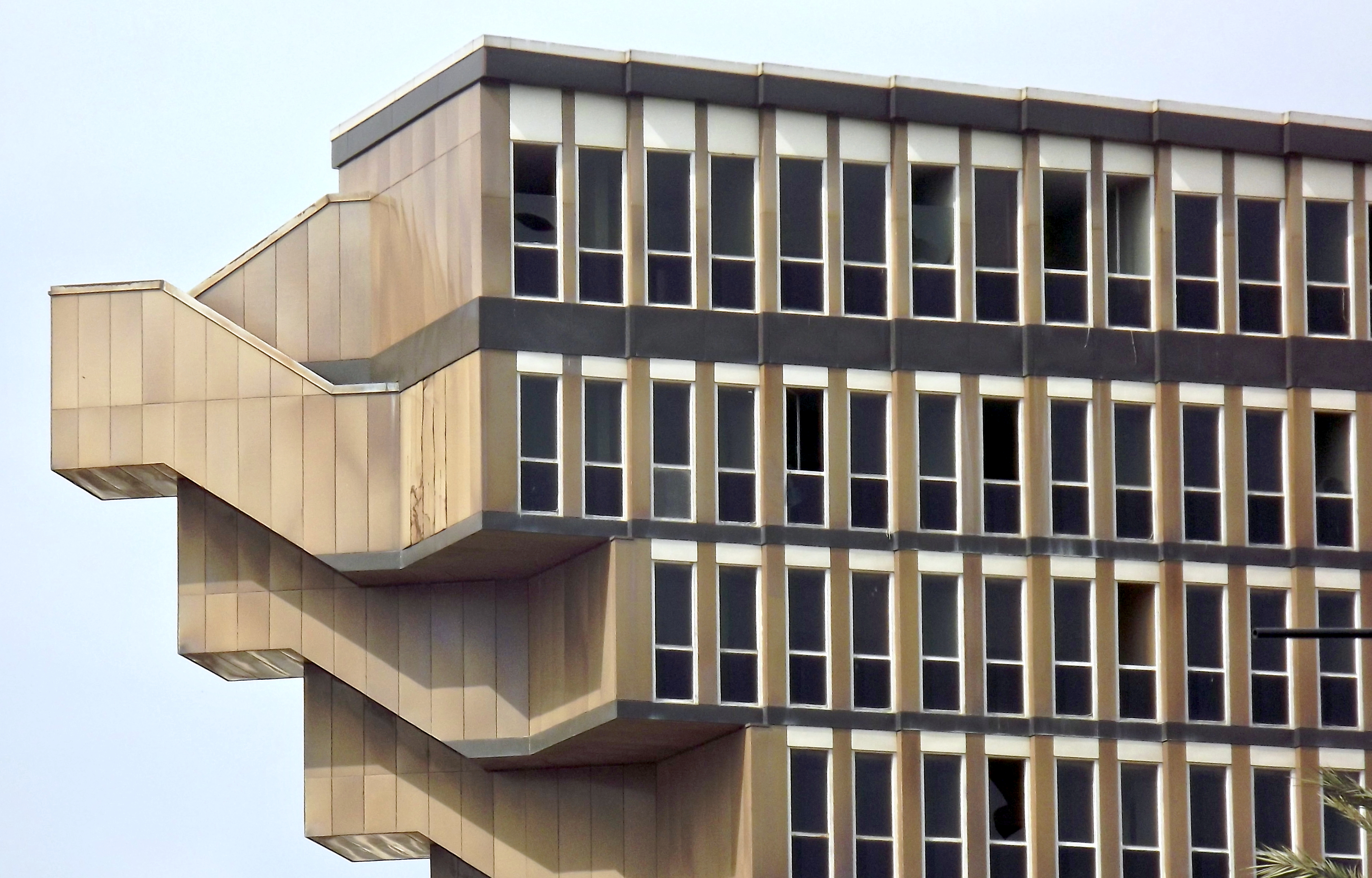
Hotel du Lac detail

Raffaele Contigiani (1920–2008) was an Italian architect and painter. He qualified as an architect in 1947 and designed pavilions for the Italian Chamber of Commerce in the 1950s and 1960s. He was a consultant for the Italian television broadcaster RAI in the 1960s but is best known for his design for Hotel du Lac (1970–1973) in Tunis which he designed in the brutalist style.

== Early life ==
Contigiani was born in Turin in 1920. He served in the military during the Second World War and was a prisoner of war in Germany.

== Career ==
Contigiani qualified as an architect from the Faculty of Architecture at Rome in 1947. He designed buildings in Italy, Eastern Europe, and in North Africa. Among these were pavilions for the Italian Chamber of Commerce in Libya and Tunisia in the 1950s and three at the Zagreb trade fair in the late 1950s and early 1960s.

He was a consultant to the Italian television broadcaster RAI and with Mario de Renzi and Renato Avolio de Martino designed the RAI Auditorium in Naples which was built between 1958 and 1963.

Among his notable works is the Hotel du Lac in Tunis (1970–1974) which he designed in a brutalist style and has been seen as symbolic of the modernisation of Tunisia in the 1970s. Its distinctive shape has been described as the inspiration for the sandcrawler vehicle of the Star Wars films, as significant parts of the first trilogy were filmed in the country. However, British director and set designer Roger Christian has said that the sandcrawler was designed by Ralph McQuarrie before Star Wars director George Lucas visited Tunisia. As of April 2019, the hotel is unoccupied and being considered for demolition.

Contigiani also painted scenes from prisoner of war camps in Germany and published a number of collections of his paintings.

== Death ==
Contigiani died in 2008.

== Selected publications ==
- Ecologia e Urbanistica. Edizioni Mediterranee, Rome, 1978. (Paintings)
- Invito Alla Bici. Edizioni Mediterranee, Rome, 1981. (Paintings)
