= Pavilion (exhibition) =

Genre of building at large international exhibitions

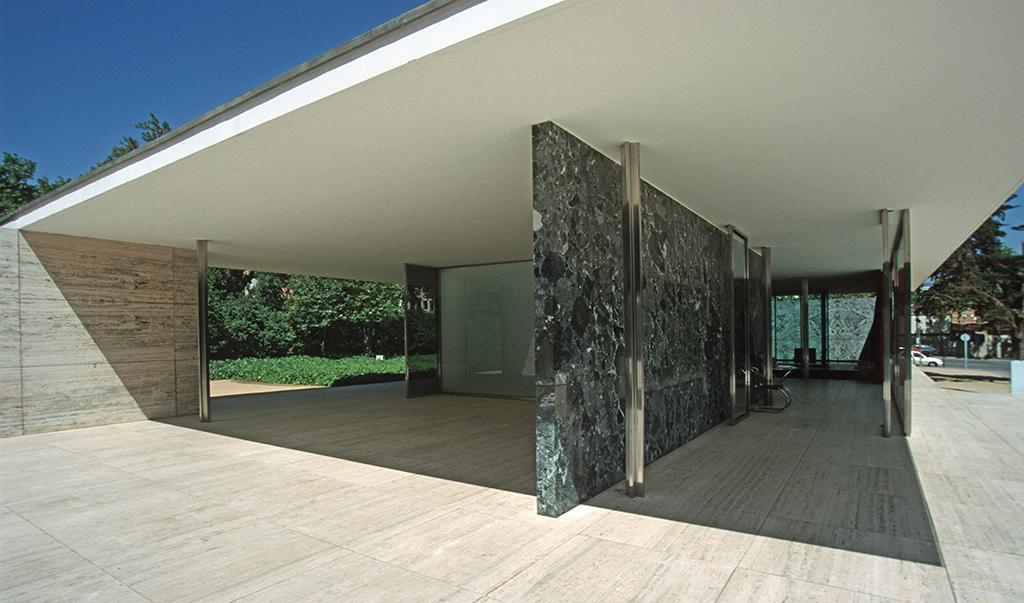
The Barcelona Pavillon as reconstructed in 1999.

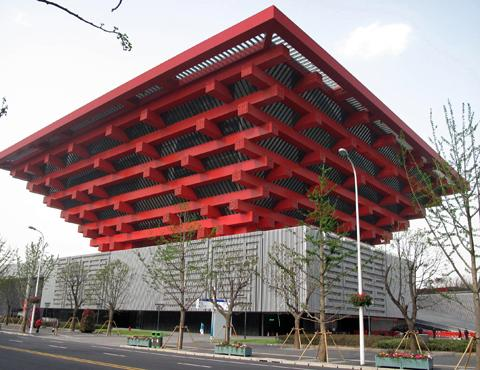
The China pavilion at the Expo 2010

A pavilion is a genre of building often found at large international exhibitions such as a World's fair. It may be designed by a well-known architect or designer from the exhibiting country to showcase the latest technology of the exhibitor or be designed in what is considered the national architectural style of the exhibiting country. The German pavilion for the 1929 Barcelona International Exposition, for instance, was designed by noted modernist German architects Ludwig Mies van der Rohe and Lilly Reich.

== See also ==
- Aberdeen Pavilion
- Bridge Pavilion
- Canada Pavilion, British Empire Exhibition
- Expo 2010 pavilions
- Moscow Pavilion
- Pavilion (generally)
