= Zsombor Deak =

Tritlaton top qualitier

Zsombor Deák
Personal information
- Full name: Zsombor Deak
- Born: 17 August 1989 (age 36) Cluj-Napoca, Romania
- Education: Babeș-Bolyai University – Physical and Sport Education
- Occupation: Professional athlete
- Height: 1.81 m (5 ft 11 in)
- Weight: 70 kg (150 lb)
- Website: www.zsombordeak.com

Sport
- Club: ASK Aluta
- Turned pro: 2013

Zsombor Deák (Hungarian: [ˈʒombor ˈdɛaːk]; born 17 August 1989) is a professional triathlete from Romania. Zsombor is a multiple top 5 World Cup finisher and multiple National Champion.

== Personal life ==
Zsombor grew up in Sfântu Gheorghe, Romania. He was a very energetic boy and also has been a vegetarian since the age of 3. Soon he realised he is able to run and exercise much more than his peers. At age 14 he moved to Hungary to continue his studies at the Nyíregyházi Vasvári Pál Gimnázium Sports School. While in high school, a friend introduced him to triathlon. It was love at first sight. Zsombor completed his studies in 2011 in Cluj-Napoca at Babeş-Bolyai University. He was keen on further developing his sports career, so he moved to Australia in 2013.

== Triathlon career ==
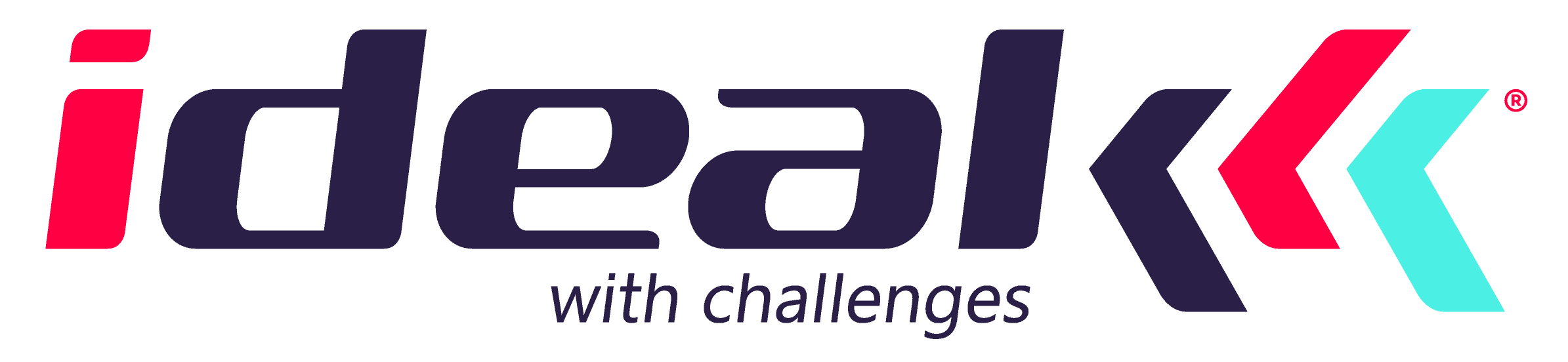

Zsombor attended several running, duathlon and triathlon races since high school. He had some very outstanding results both nationally and internationally. Then he moved to Australia and attended his first world cup as an adult, professional triathlete. On his very first Ironman 70.3, he finished in 4th place (Ironman 70.3 TAIWAN). Since then, he attends 6-10 World Cups (Ironman, Challenge Family, ITU) a year, usually ranking in the top 10. He travels all year round spending his winters training and racing in Australia and Asia. He loves exotic places and always looks for challenges. In 2016 he founded his own brand, the "IDEAL with Challenges" to motivate his followers with his life-story. He achieved everything with hard work and perseverance, thus his motto is: "Dream big, achieve more!" He is vegetarian since the age of 3.

== Results ==
- 2024- Langkawi (MALAYSIA) – 15th place /Ironman Malaysia
- 2024- Kotor (MONTENEGRO) – 2nd place /Ocean Lava Montenegro
- 2023- Cozumel (MEXICO) – 18th place /Ironman Cozumel
- 2023- Taitung (TAIWAN) – 6th place /Challenge Taiwan
- 2023- Davao (PHILIPPINES) – 5th place /Ironman 70.3 Davao
- 2022- Busselton (AUSTRALIA) – 15th place /Ironman Western Australia
- 2021- Kotor (MONTENEGRO) – 5th place /Ocean Lava Montenegro
- 2020- Budapest (HUNGARY) – 1st place /Urban Games
- 2020- Budapest (HUNGARY) – 1st place /Nato Run
- 2019- Wenzhou (CHINA) – 9th place /Middle Distance World Cup
- 2019- Zurich (SWITZERLAND) – 10th Place /Ironman Switzerland
- 2019- Tg Mures (ROMANIA) – 8th place /Middle Distance European Championship
- 2019- Taitung (TAIWAN) – 1st place /Puyaman Triathlon
- 2018- Penghu (TAIWAN) – 7th place /Ironman Taiwan
- 2018- Bidgoszcz (POLAND) – 3rd place /Ocean Lava Poland
- 2018- Robertvile (BELGIUM) – 2nd place /Ocean Lava Belgium
- 2017- Penghu (TAIWAN) – 6th place /Ironman Taiwan
- 2017- Herning (DENMARK) – 14th place /Middle Distance European Championship
- 2017- Bintan (INDONESIA) – 7th place /Ironman 70.3 Bintan
- 2017- Quijing (CHINA) – 9th place /Ironman 70.3 Quijing
- 2016- Xiamen (CHINA) – 7th place /Ironman 70.3 Xiamen
- 2016- Chungju (SOUTH KOREA) – 3rd place /Ironman 70.3 Chungju
- 2016- Da Nang (VIETNAM) – 9th place /Ironman 70.3 Vietnam
- 2016- Sungailiat (INDONESIA) – 2nd place / Sungaliat Half Ironman Indonesia
- 2016- Taitung (TAIWAN) – 10th Place / Ironman 70.3 Taiwan
- 2015- Kenting (TAIWAN) – 8th place /Ironman 70.3 Taiwan
- 2015- Gurye (SOUTH KOREA) – 10th Place /Ironman 70.3 Gurye
- 2015- Incheon (SOUTH KOREA) – 9th place /Ironman 70.3 Incheon
- 2015- Kenting (TAIWAN) – 11th Place /Ironman Taiwan
- 2014- Bahrain(BAHRAIN) – 28th place /Challenge Bahrain (youngest pro athlete!)
- 2014- Kenting (TAIWAN) – 8th place /Ironman 70.3 Taiwan
- 2014- Langkawi(MALAYSIA) – 8th place /Ironman Malaysia
- 2013- Taitung (TAIWAN) – 4th place /Challenge Taiwan
- 2013- Kenting (TAIWAN) – 4th place /Ironman 70.3 Taiwan
- 2013- Bintan (INDONESIA) – 4th place /Metaman Half-Ironman
- Multiple Romanian champion
- Multiple half-marathon and marathon champion
- Multiple powerman duathlon U23 podium
