= Hôtel du Lac, Tunis =

Hotel in Tunis, Tunisia

Hôtel du Lac
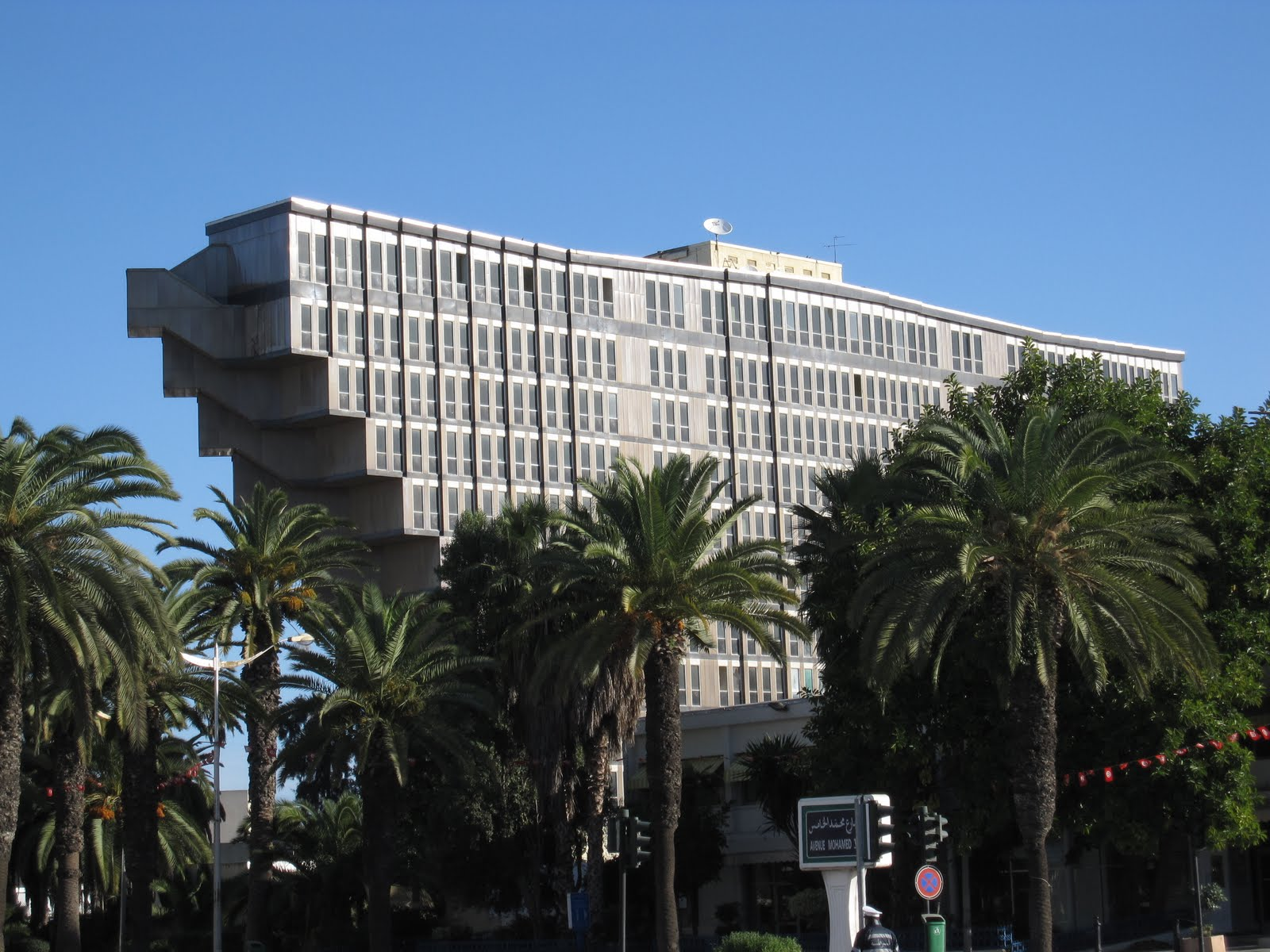
- Hotel du Lac in 2010

- Location within Tunisia

General information
- Architectural style: Brutalist
- Location: Place du 14, Janvier 2011, Tunis, Tunisia
- Coordinates: 36°48′07″N 10°11′14″E
- Construction started: 1970
- Completed: 1973
- Owner: Libyan Arab Foreign Investment Company

Technical details
- Material: Exposed concrete
- Floor count: 10

Design and construction
- Architect: Raffaele Contigiani

Other information
- Number of rooms: 416

The Hôtel du Lac (English: Lake Hotel) is a hotel in Tunis. The building was designed in the Brutalist style by the Italian architect Raffaele Contigiani and built from 1970 to 1973 for the Tunisian government of Habib Bourguiba.

== Location ==
The hotel stands to the north of the Place du 14 – Janvier 2011 (formerly the Place du 7 – Novembre 1987) at the eastern end of Avenue Habib Bourguiba, between Avenue Mohammed V and A1 motorway, to the west of the Lake of Tunis.

== Construction and design ==
It was constructed on 190 reinforced concrete piles up to 60 m (200 ft) deep, and built from exposed concrete (béton brut) around a steel structure, creating a single long block with ten floors, with large windows. Projecting cantilevered stairs at each end create an inverted pyramid shape. The 416 bedrooms are mostly on the upper floors, with the top floor twice as long as the ground floor. The interior décor reflected the 1970s, with floors covered by linoleum and a colour palette of brown, orange and red.

The striking design, departing from traditional Arab and European architecture, made the hotel a symbol of modernism in Tunis. It remains an important example of Brutalism in North Africa. Its distinctive shape has prompted comparisons with the sandcrawler vehicle of the Star Wars films.

== Recent history ==
The hotel was privatised in the 1990s, but fell into disrepair and closed in 2000. It was bought by the Libyan Arab Foreign Investment Company (LAFICO) in 2010,which proposed demolishing the building and spending up to $150 million to replace it with a 20-storey luxury hotel and mall that would retain its "concept and shape". Concerns about imminent demolition were raised again in 2025.

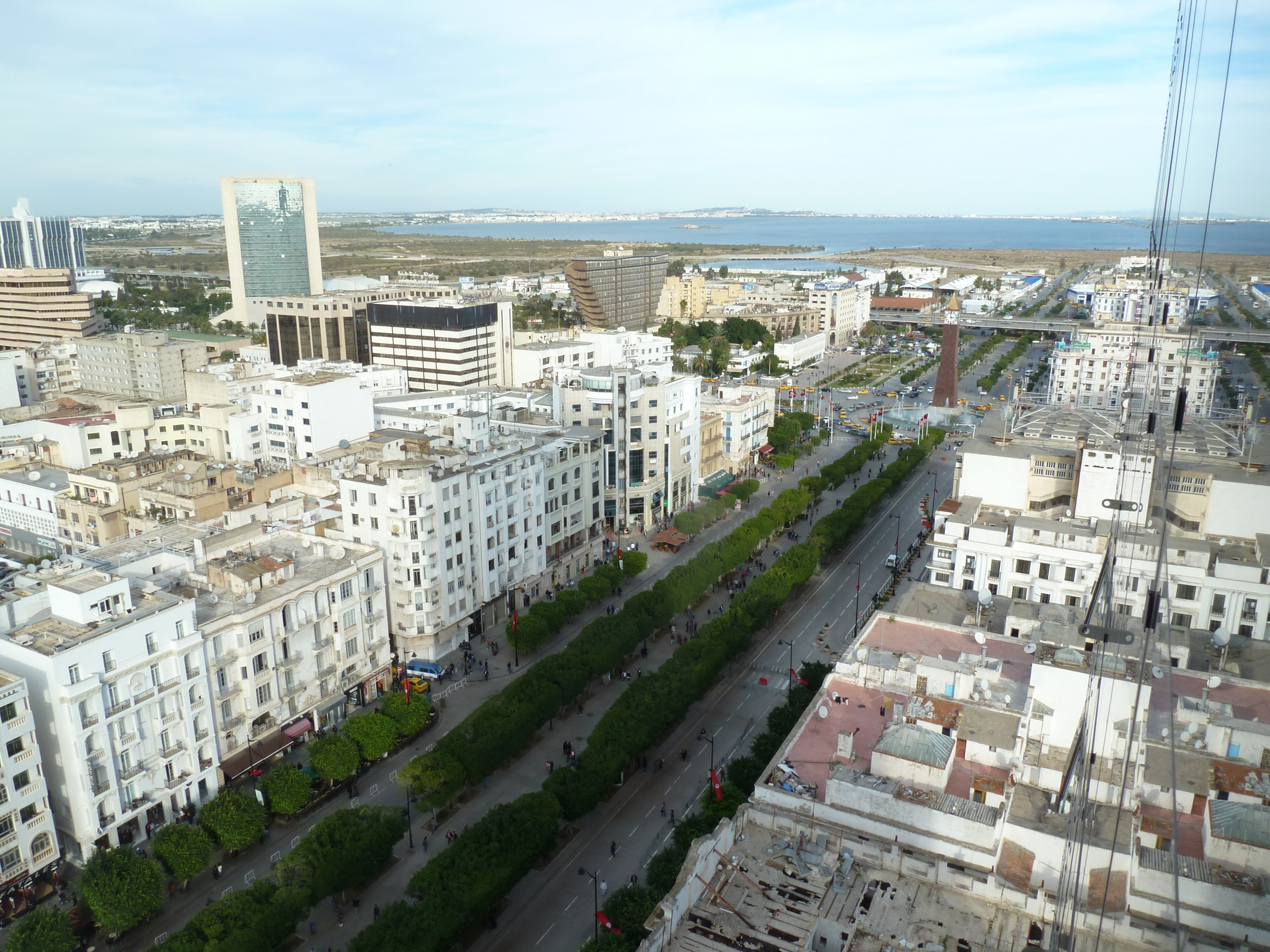
The hotel in central Tunis in 2015

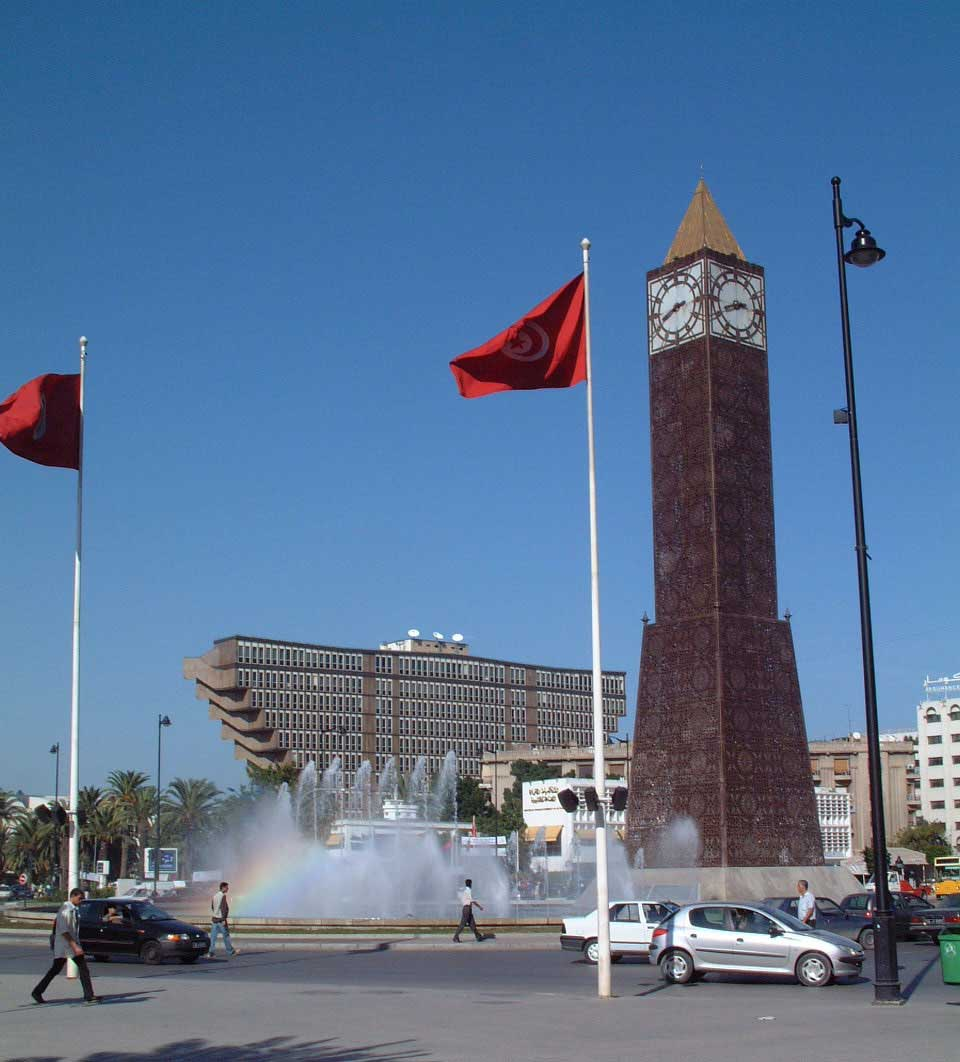
The hotel in 2005, viewed from the Place du 7 – Novembre 1987 (now the Place du 14 – Janvier 2011)

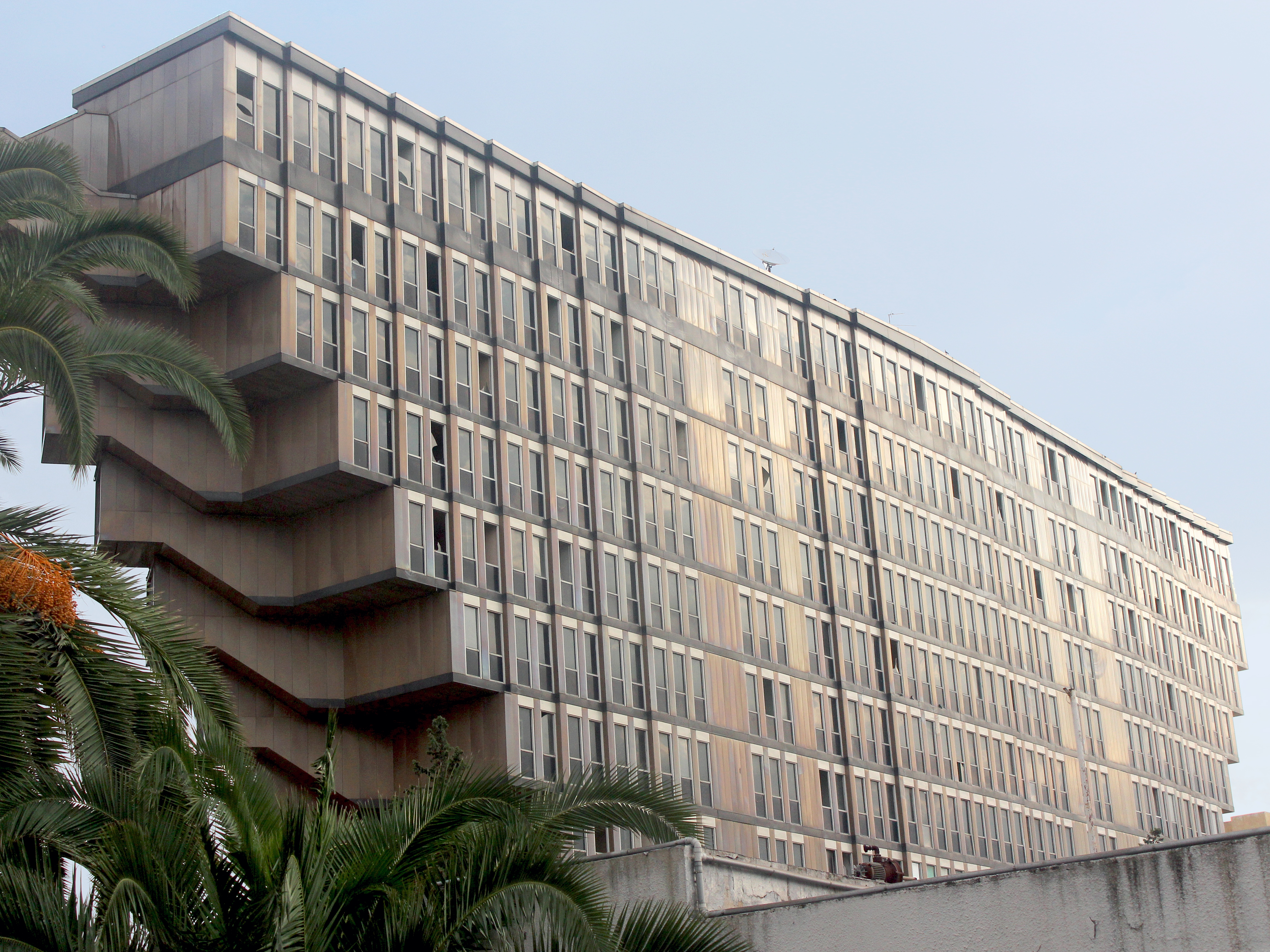
The hotel in 2018

== References and sources ==
Sources

- Ahmed Zaouche et Maryse Bideault, "Hôtel du Lac" dans Claudine Piaton et Juliette Hueber (eds.) Tunis architectures, 1860–1960, Arles : Honoré Clair ; Tunis : Elyzad, 2011, p. 193
- LAFICO to Develop Tunisian Resort, Libya-businessnews.com, 26 November 2013
- LAFICO to Develop Tunisian Resort, Libya-businessnews.com, 26 November 2013
- Tunisia's high-flying Brutalist hotel is safe after demolition scare, The Architects Newspaper, 13 March 2019
- The inspiration for Star Wars' Sandcrawler, Hôtel du Lac, faces imminent demolition, Archinect News, 27 March 2019
- Raffaele Contigiani: Hôtel du Lac, 1970–1973, sosbrutalism.org
- Hôtel du Lac, World Monuments Fund
