= Romuald Gutt =

Polish architect

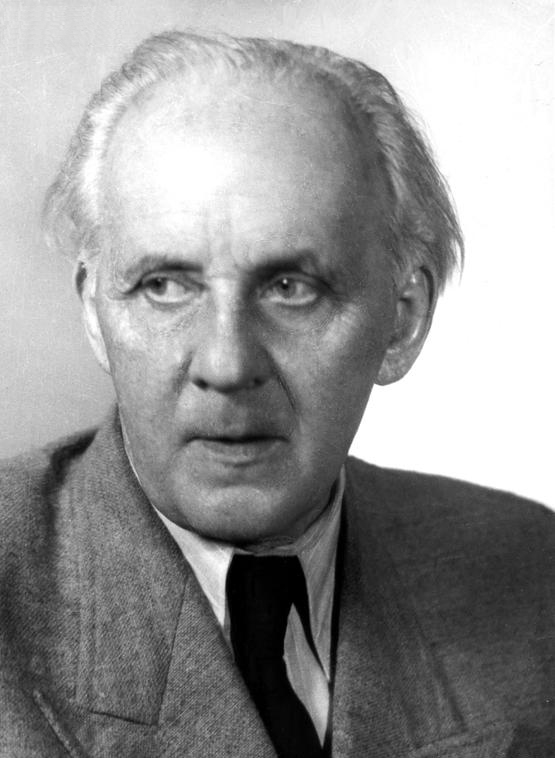
- Born: 6 February 1888; Warsaw, Poland
- Died: 3 September 1974 (aged 86); Warsaw, Poland
- Occupation: Architect

Romuald Gutt (6 February 1888 – 3 September 1974) was a Polish architect. His work was part of the architecture event in the art competition at the 1936 Summer Olympics.
