= 1798 in architecture =

The year 1798 in architecture involved some significant events.

== Buildings and structures ==
=== Buildings ===
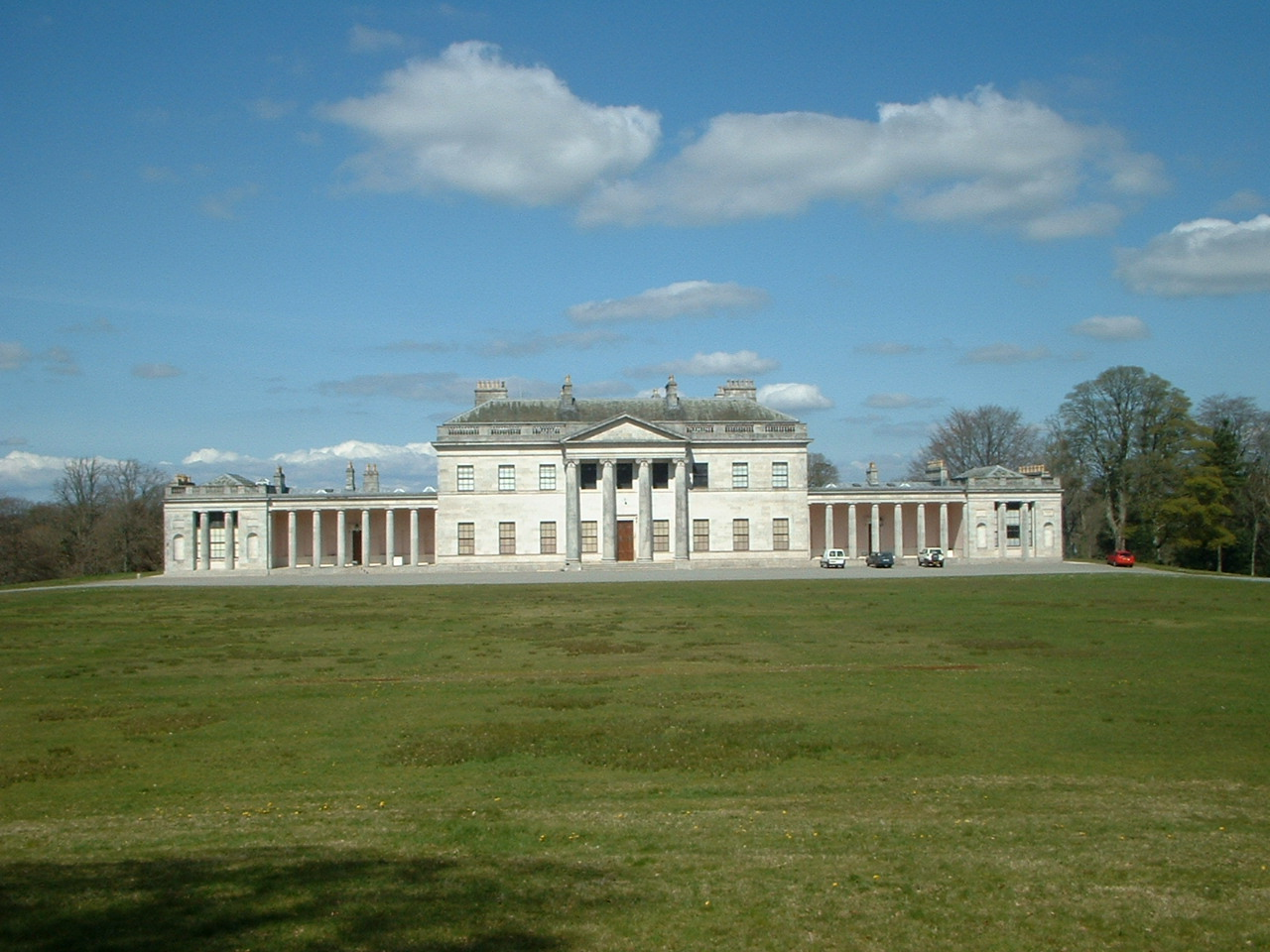
Castle Coole

- September 2 – Opening of the Teatro Comunale (Ferrara) in Italy, designed by Cosimo Morelli and Antonio Foschini.
- Building of the first major example of Egyptian Revival architecture, Karlsruhe Synagogue in Baden, designed by Friedrich Weinbrenner.
- Completion of the neoclassical summer retreat at Castle Coole in Northern Ireland, designed by James Wyatt.
- Completion of the theatre and summer retreat at Ostankino Palace near Moscow.
- Completion of the Massachusetts State House in Boston, designed by Charles Bulfinch.
- Completion of the Royal Chapel of St. Anthony of La Florida in Madrid, designed by Felipe Fontana.
- Completion of the İzzet Mehmet Pasha Mosque in Safranbolu, Turkey.
- Completion of first São João National Theatre in Porto, Portugal as an opera house, designed by Vicente Mazzoneschi.
- Opening of the Teatro della Concordia in Iesi, Ancona.
- Building of Bewdley Bridge over the River Severn in England, designed by Thomas Telford.
- Opening of the skew Store Street Aqueduct on the Ashton Canal in Manchester, designed by Benjamin Outram.
- Completion of remodelling of Romney's House, Hampstead, London, to incorporate a studio and gallery, designed by Samuel Bunce.

== Births ==
- May 8 – Joseph Welland, Irish architect (died 1860)
- June 27 – Joseph John Scoles, English Catholic architect (died 1863)
- October 14 – Félix Duban, French architect (died 1870)

== Deaths ==
- June 25 – Thomas Sandby, English watercolour artist and architect (born 1721)
- November 2 – Charles de Wailly, French architect (born 1730)
- December 10 – Laurynas Gucevičius, Lithuanian architect (born 1753)
