= 1814 in architecture =

The following significant events in architecture occurred in the year 1814.

== Buildings and structures ==
=== Buildings completed ===
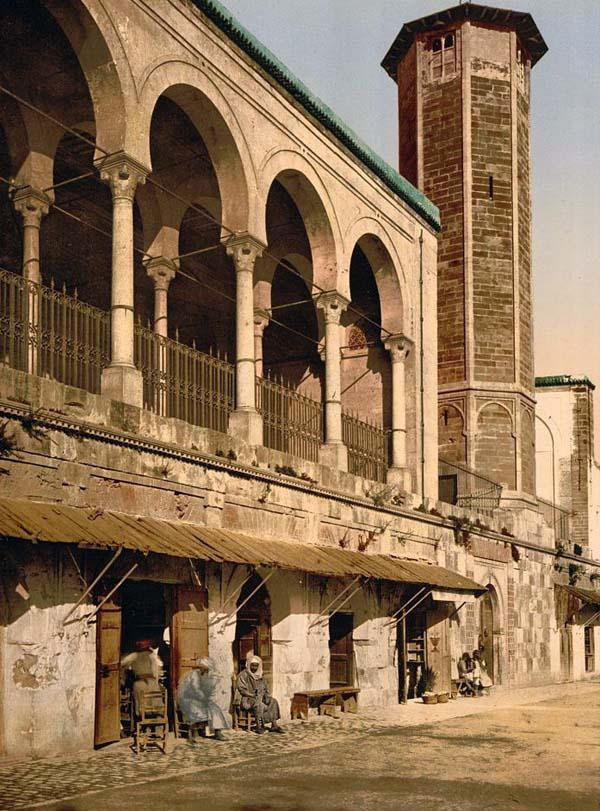
Saheb Ettabaâ Mosque – photochrom of 1899

- Craigellachie Bridge, Scotland, designed by Thomas Telford, is completed.
- Pont d'Iéna over the Seine in Paris, commissioned by Napoleon I of France in 1807, is completed.
- Iglesia de San Juan Bautista (Chiclana de la Frontera), Spain, designed in 1776 by Torcuato Cayón, is completed.
- St George's Church, Everton, England, designed by ironfounder John Cragg with Thomas Rickman, is consecrated.
- St George's Church, Charlotte Square, New Town, Edinburgh, Scotland, designed by Robert Reid, is completed.
- Chapel Royal, Dublin, designed by Francis Johnston, is completed.
- Lough Cooter Castle, Gort, Ireland, designed by John Nash, is completed.
- Middletown Alms House in Connecticut is completed.
- Narva Triumphal Arch in Saint Petersburg, Russia, designed by Giacomo Quarenghi, is built in wood; it is rebuilt in stone between 1827 and 1834.
- Saheb Ettabaâ Mosque in Tunis, construction led by Ben Sassi, is completed.
- Museum, Palace and St Stephan Catholic Church in Karlsruhe (Baden), designed by Friedrich Weinbrenner, are completed.
- Market Cross, Devizes, designed by James Wyatt is completed.

== Awards ==
- Grand Prix de Rome, architecture: Charles Henri Landon and Louis Destouches.

== Births ==
- January 27 – Eugène Viollet-le-Duc, French architect and architectural theorist (died 1879)
- February 10 – Harvey Lonsdale Elmes, English architect (died 1847)
- March 9 – James William Wild, English decorative architect to the Great Exhibition of 1851 (died 1892)
- April 16 – Miklós Ybl, Hungarian architect (died 1891)

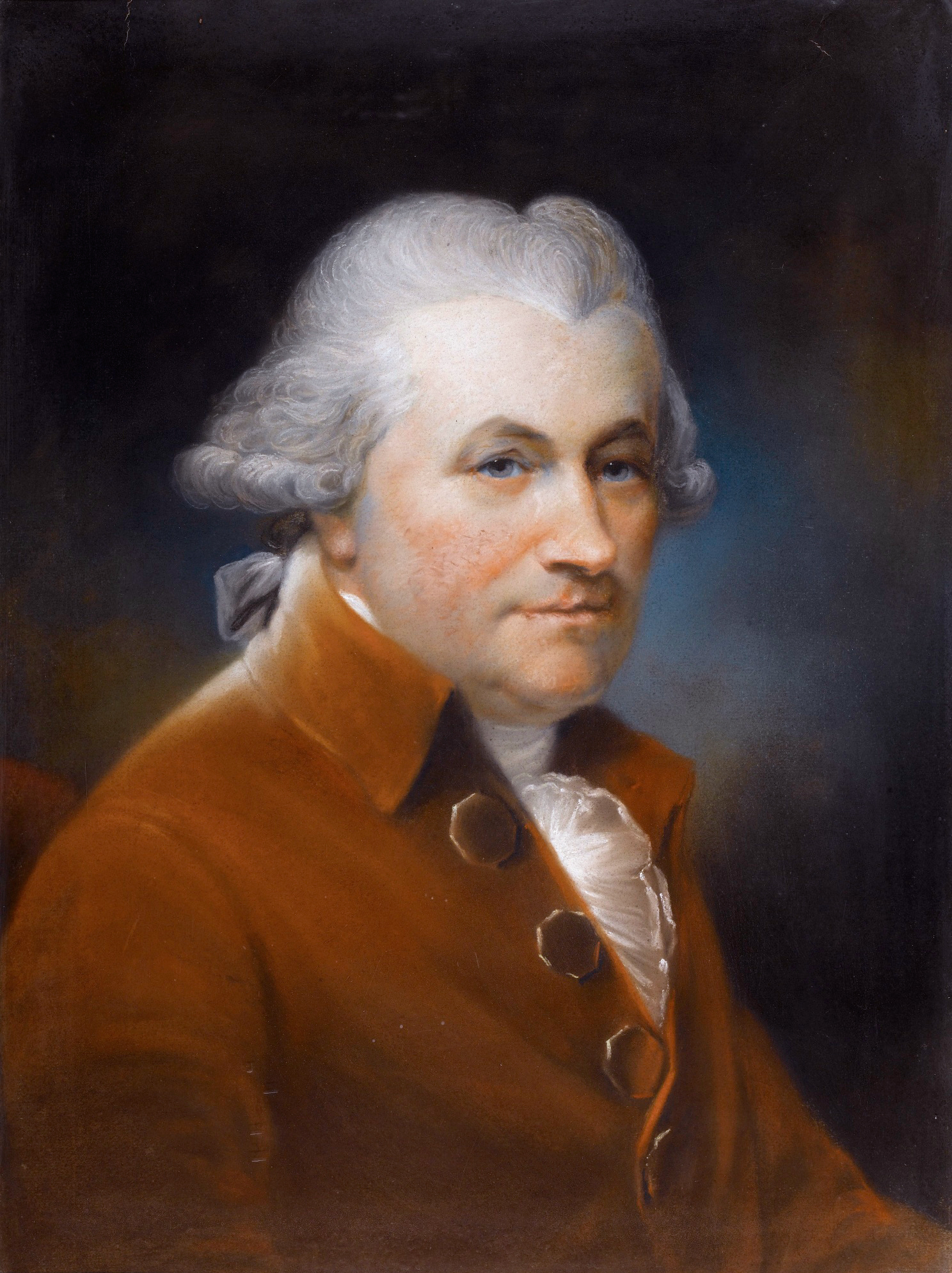
John Johnson

- May 26 – Wilhelm Engerth, Austrian architect and engineer (died 1884)
- September 7 – William Butterfield, English ecclesiastical architect (died 1900)

== Deaths ==
- August 17 – John Johnson, English architect and Surveyor to the County of Essex (born 1732)
- August 20 – Giuseppe Pistocchi, Italian Neoclassical architect (born 1744)
- December 19 – Giuseppe Venanzio Marvuglia, Italian architect (born 1729)
