= 1829 in architecture =

The year 1829 in architecture involved some significant events.

== Buildings and structures ==
=== Buildings ===
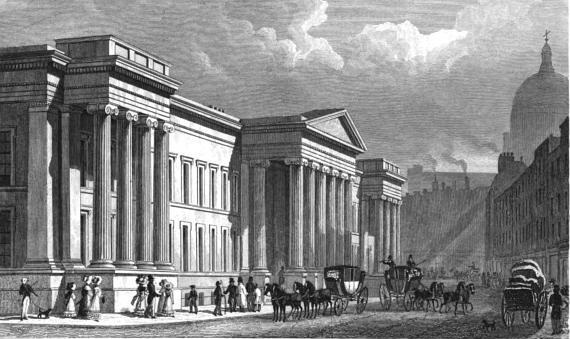
Old General Post Office, London

- The General Post Office building in St Martins-le-Grand in the City of London, designed by Robert Smirke, is completed (replaced c.1912).
- Work begins on the Travellers' Club in London, designed by Charles Barry.
- Hospicio Cabañas in Guadalajara, Mexico, designed by Manuel Tolsá, is completed.
- The new building of the Royal High School, Edinburgh, Scotland on Calton Hill, designed by Thomas Hamilton, is opened.
- Eastern State Penitentiary, Philadelphia, Pennsylvania, designed by John Haviland, is opened.
- Central Congregational Church (Eastport, Maine) is built.
- St Peter's Church, Hammersmith, London, designed by Edward Lapidge, is consecrated.
- The Oratory, Liverpool, England, designed by John Foster, is built.

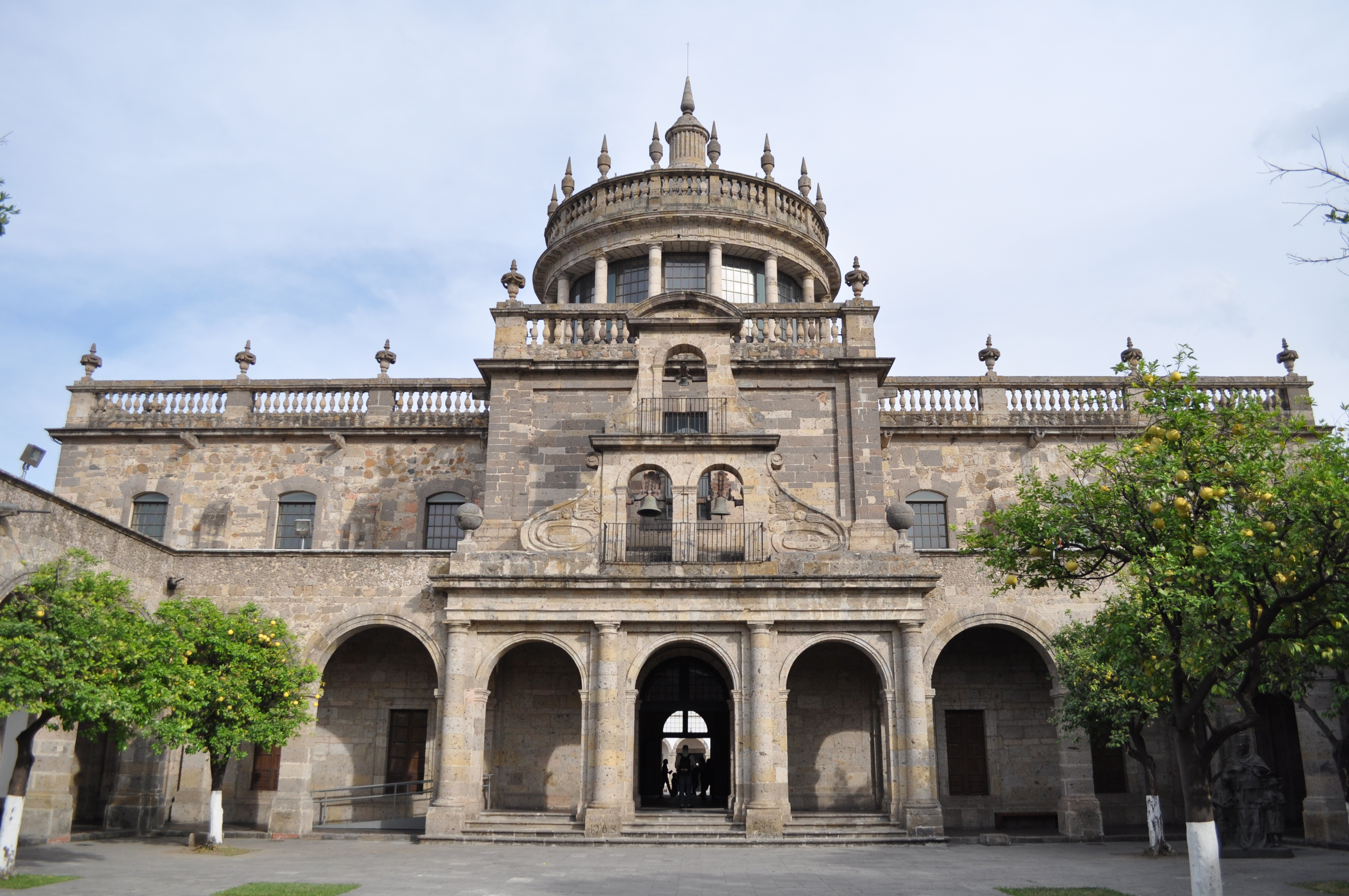
Hospicio Cabañas in Guadalajara, Mexico

- Construction of the National Monument of Scotland in Edinburgh, designed by Charles Robert Cockerell and William Henry Playfair, is abandoned due to funds being exhausted, leaving only a row of Doric columns supporting the entablature.
- Cromer Hall in England, designed by William Donthorne, is built.
- Octagon House (Columbus, Georgia) is built.
- Sferisterio di Macerata in Italy, designed by Ireneo Aleandri, is completed.
- Construction of Cisternoni of Livorno in Italy, designed by Pasquale Poccianti, begins (completed 1848).
- Kvitsøy Lighthouse in Norway is built.
- Carrollton Viaduct on the Baltimore and Ohio Railroad, designed by James Lloyd, is completed.

== Awards ==
- Grand Prix de Rome, architecture: Simon-Claude Constant-Dufeux.

== Births ==
- February 8 – Joseph Auguste Émile Vaudremer, French architect (died 1914)
- March 4 – Hermann Ende, German architect (died 1907)
- March 6 – Arthur Blomfield, English architect (died 1899)
- June 18 – Edmund George Lind, English-born American architect (died 1909)
- Charles Babcock, American architect (died 1913)
- George Corson, Scottish-born architect working in Leeds (died 1910)
- William Henry Lynn, Irish architect (died 1915)
- William Martin, English architect working in Birmingham (died 1900)

== Deaths ==
- March 14 – Francis Johnston, Irish architect (born 1760)
- March 29 – Thomas Harrison, English architect and bridge engineer (born 1744)
- November 1 – George Allen Underwood, English architect working in Cheltenham (born 1793)
