= 1803 in architecture =

The year 1803 in architecture involved some significant architectural events and new buildings.

== Buildings and structures ==
=== Buildings ===
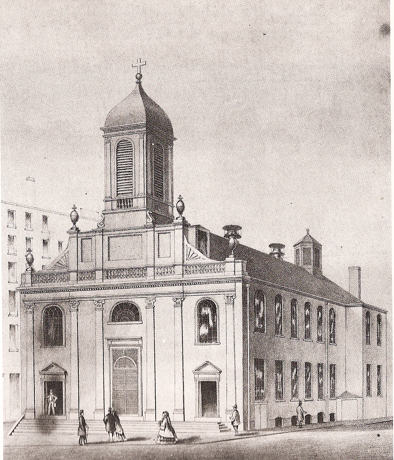
Holy Cross Church, Boston

- The Raj Bhavan in Kolkata, West Bengal, India.
- Holy Cross Church, Boston, Massachusetts, designed by Charles Bulfinch, dedicated.
- St. John's Chapel (New York City), designed by John McComb, Jr. and his brother Isaac.
- Rivington Unitarian Chapel in Lancashire, England.
- Bob Church, Cluj, Transylvania.
- Casa del Labrador, designed by Isidro González Velásquez, at the Royal Palace of Aranjuez in Spain is completed.
- Nantwich Bridge in Cheshire, England, built by William Lightfoot.

== Awards ==
- Grand Prix de Rome, architecture: François-Narcisse Pagot.

== Births ==
- April 3 – David Bryce, Scottish architect (died 1876)
- April 20 – Christian Hansen, Danish historicist architect (died 1883)
- August 3 – Joseph Paxton, English gardener, architect and MP (died 1865)
- October 16 – Robert Stephenson, English railway civil and mechanical engineer (died 1859)
- November 29 – Gottfried Semper, German architect, art critic and professor of architecture (died 1879)

== Deaths ==
- date unknown – Ottone Calderari, Italian architect and writer (born 1730)
