= 1863 in architecture =

The year 1863 in architecture involved some significant architectural events and new buildings.

== Events ==
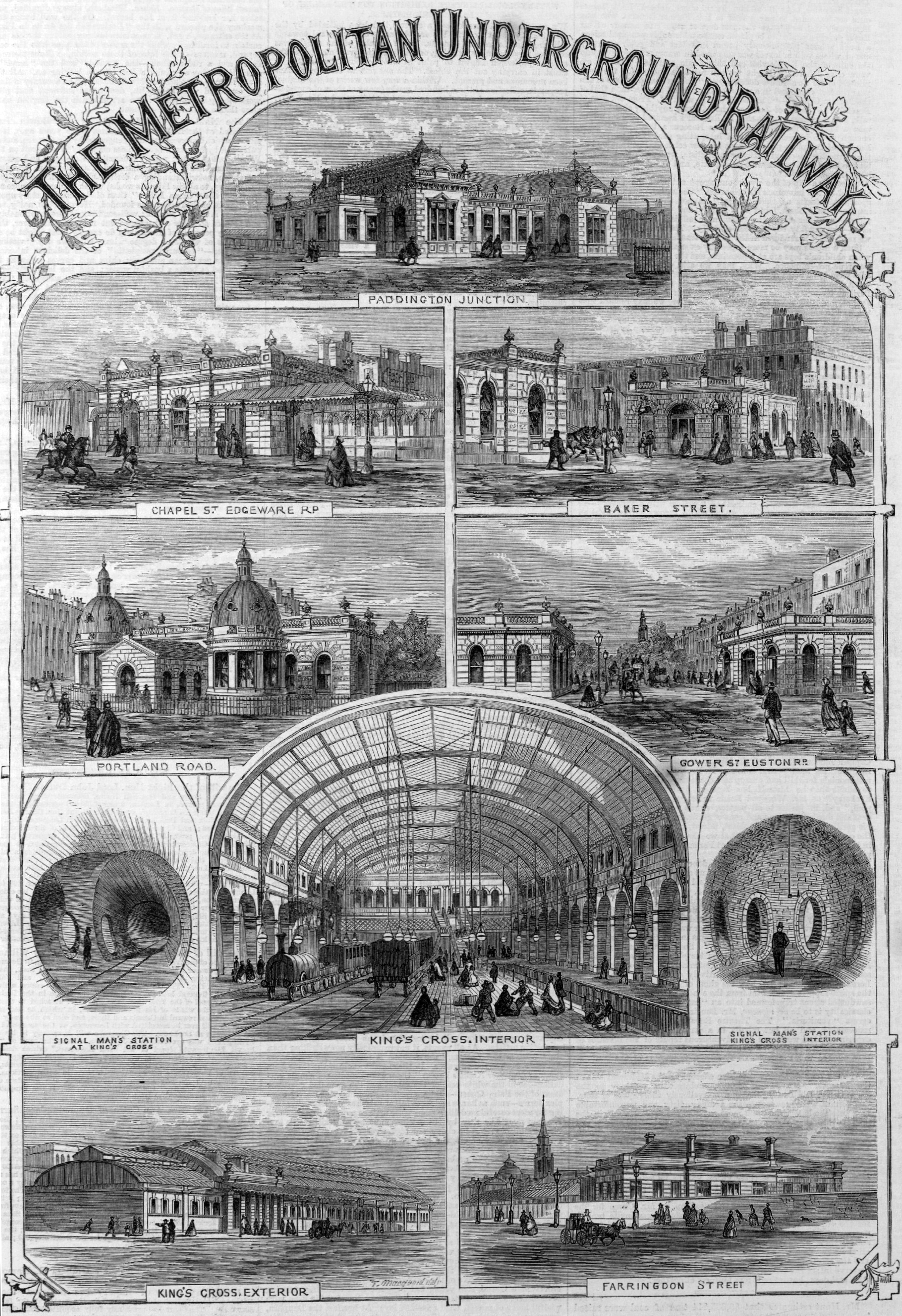
London

- January 10 – The Metropolitan Railway, London, England, is opened, the world's first underground railway (engineer: John Fowler).
- December 2 – The Statue of Freedom is set on top of the new dome of the United States Capitol in Washington, D.C.
- date unknown
  - The École des Beaux-Arts in Paris becomes independent of the Académie des Beaux-Arts.
  - William Burges is declared winner of the competition to design the new Saint Fin Barre's Cathedral, Cork (Church of Ireland), his first major commission.

== Buildings and structures ==
=== Buildings opened ===
- March 2 – Clapham Junction railway station, London.
- October 18 – Befreiungshalle memorial above Kelheim in Bavaria, designed by Friedrich von Gärtner and completed by Leo von Klenze, is inaugurated.
- October 27 – Leeuwarden railway station in the Netherlands, designed by Charles van Brederode.
- December 13 – Gulen Church, Eivindvik, Norway, designed by Georg Andreas Bull, consecrated by Dean Thomas Erichsen.

=== Buildings completed ===
- Berns Salonger, Stockholm, Sweden.
- Smíchov Synagogue, Prague, Czech Republic.
- Kelham Hall near Newark-on-Trent, England, designed by George Gilbert Scott.

== Awards ==
- RIBA Royal Gold Medal – Anthony Salvin.
- Grand Prix de Rome, architecture: Emmanuel Brune.

== Births ==
- April 3 – Henry van de Velde, Belgian painter, architect and interior designer (died 1957)
- May 17 – C. R. Ashbee, English interior designer (died 1942)
- October 21 – Sir George Troup, New Zealand architect, engineer and statesman (died 1941)
- December 16 – Ralph Adams Cram, American architect of academic and ecclesiastical buildings (died 1942)
- W. G. R. Sprague, Australian-born British theatre architect (died 1933)

== Deaths ==
- June 16 – Ludwig Förster, Austrian religious architect (died 1797)
- September 17 – Charles Robert Cockerell, English architect, archaeologist and writer (born 1788)
- October 9 – Andrew Egan, Irish architect and builder (born c.1810)
- October 28 – William Cubitt, English building and civil engineering contractor and politician (born 1791)
- December 29 – Joseph John Scoles, English Catholic architect (born 1798)
