= 1729 in architecture =

The year 1729 in architecture involved some significant events.

== Buildings and structures ==
=== Buildings ===
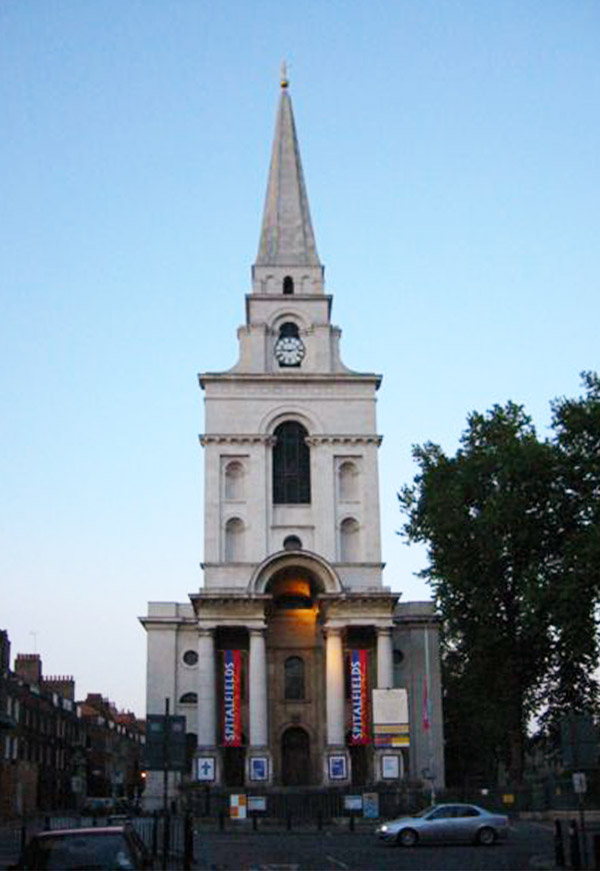
Christ Church, Spitalfields

- February 3 – The foundation stone is laid for the new Irish Houses of Parliament on College Green in Dublin, designed by Edward Lovett Pearce MP as the world's first purpose-built bicameral legislative building.
- Completion of Castletown House, Celbridge, County Kildare, Ireland's first Palladian mansion, designed by Alessandro Galilei and Edward Lovett Pearce for William Conolly, Speaker of the Irish House of Commons.
- Completion of Kinlet Hall, Shropshire, England, designed by Francis Smith of Warwick.
- Completion of Marble Hill House, Twickenham, near London, designed by Roger Morris.
- Completion of Sutton Scarsdale Hall, Derbyshire, England, designed by Francis Smith of Warwick.
- Christ Church, Spitalfields, and St George in the East in London, designed by Nicholas Hawksmoor, are completed for the Commission for Building Fifty New Churches.
- Chiswick House in London is designed by Richard Boyle, 3rd Earl of Burlington and William Kent.
- The Palladian Dormitory at Westminster School in London is designed by Richard Boyle.
- Fountain of Ahmed III (Üsküdar) completed.

== Awards ==
- Grand Prix de Rome, architecture: Joseph Eustache de Bourge.

== Births ==
- February 6 – Giuseppe Venanzio Marvuglia, Sicilian architect (died 1814)
- June 29 (bapt.) – Thomas Atkinson, English architect working in Yorkshire (died 1798)
- November 5 – Martín de Aldehuela, Spanish architect (died 1802)
- November 24 – Jean-François Leroy, French architect (died 1791)
- Approximate date – Joseph Turner, Welsh-born architect (died 1807)

== Deaths ==
- September 13 – Colen Campbell, Scottish-born architect (born 1676)
