= 1744 in architecture =

The year 1744 in architecture involved some significant events.

== Buildings and structures ==
=== Buildings ===
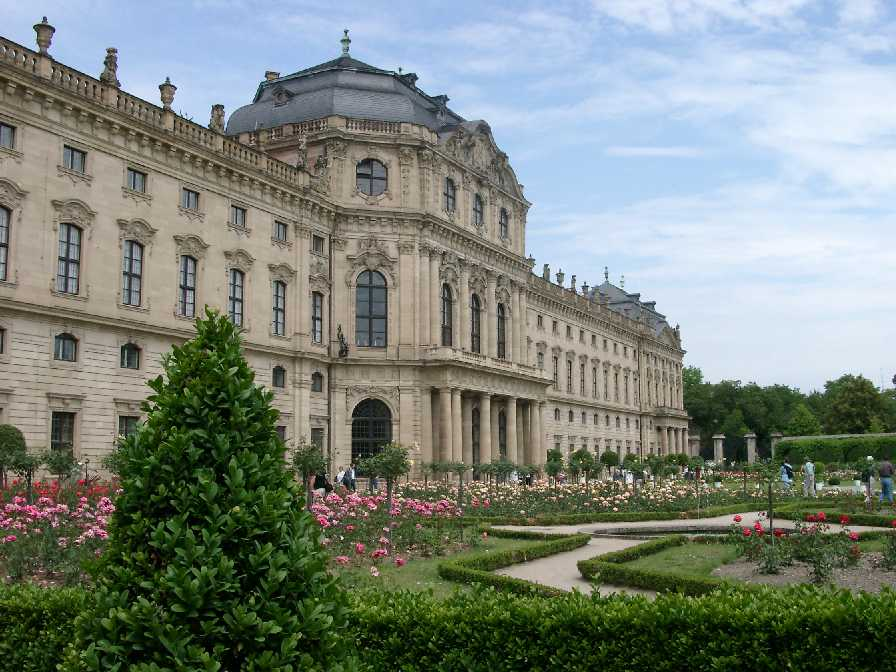
The Würzburg Residence in Germany

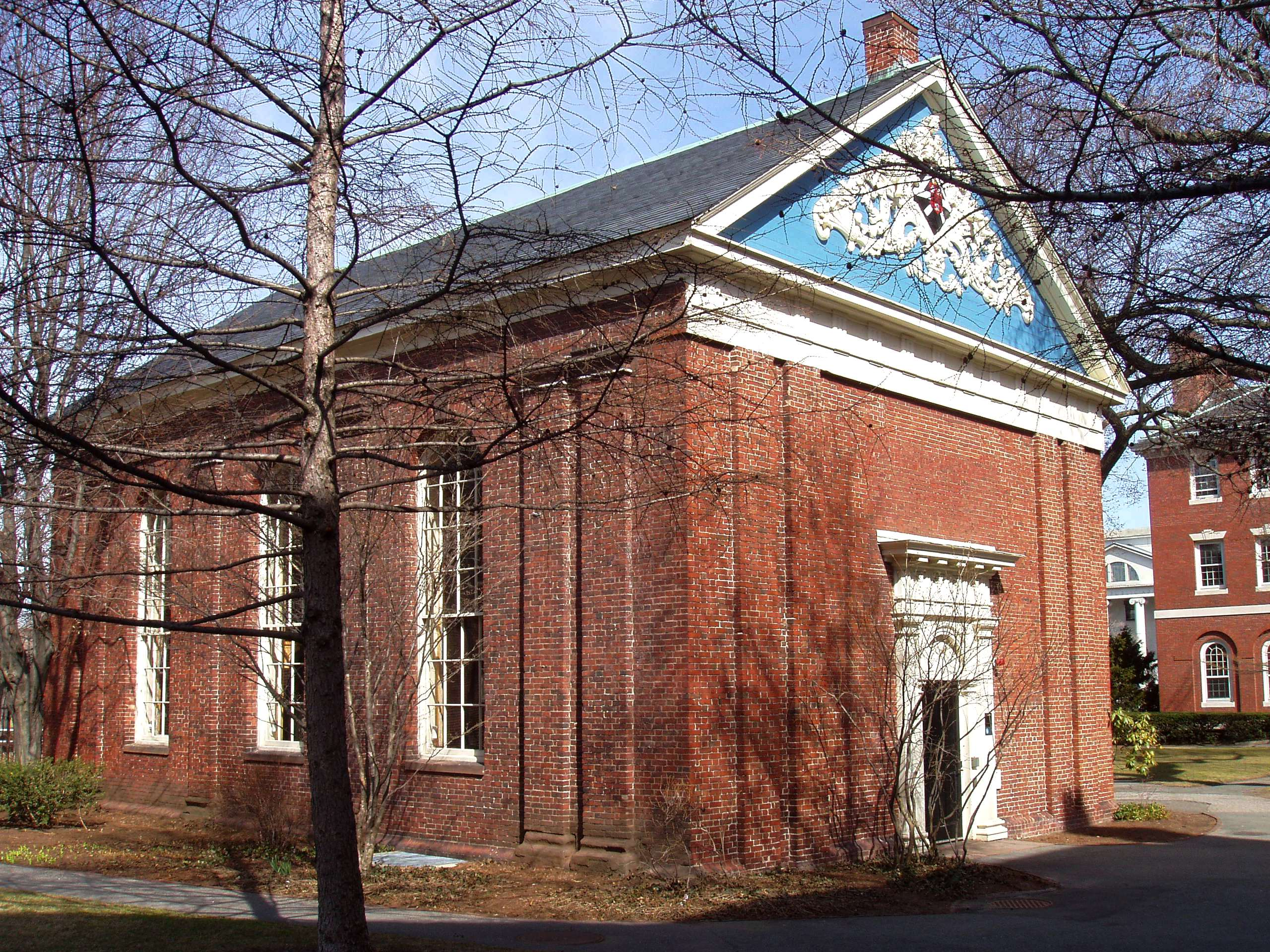
Holden Chapel

- Giác Lâm Pagoda in Saigon is built by Lý Thụy Long.
- Sabil-Kuttab of Katkhuda in Cairo, designed by Katkhuda of Egypt ('Abd al Rahman Katkhuda'), is built.
- Tombul Mosque in Shumen, Ottoman Empire, is completed.
- St Botolph's Aldgate church in the City of London, designed by George Dance the Elder, is completed.
- St John the Baptist's Church, Knutsford in England, designed by J. Garlive, is completed.
- Twelve Collegia in Saint Petersburg, designed by Domenico Trezzini and Theodor Schwertfeger, is completed.
- The second Summer Palace in Saint Petersburg, designed by Francesco Bartolomeo Rastrelli, is completed.
- Remodelling of the Hirschholm Palace in Denmark to a design by Lauritz de Thurah is completed.
- Remodelling of the Prince's Mansion, Copenhagen in Denmark by Nicolai Eigtved is completed.
- The Würzburg Residence in Germany, designed by Balthasar Neumann with Johann Lukas von Hildebrandt, Maximilian von Welsch, Robert de Cotte and Germain Boffrand, is completed (begun 1720).
- Morelia Cathedral in Mexico is completed (begun 1660).
- Alamo Mission in San Antonio is begun.
- Christ Church, Philadelphia, is completed.
- Holden Chapel at Harvard University is completed.
- St. Peter's Church in the Great Valley of Chester County, Pennsylvania, is built.
- Withcote Chapel in Leicestershire, England, is remodelled.
- St. Martin's Church, Warsaw, is reconstructed to a design by Karol Bay at about this date.

== Births ==
- August 7 (bapt.) – Thomas Harrison, English architect (d. 1829)
- September 20 or 21 – Giacomo Quarenghi, Italian-born architect (d. 1817)
