= 1879 in architecture =

The year 1879 in architecture involved some significant events.

== Events ==
- Autumn – Proposals to reconstruct the west front of St Mark's Basilica in Venice are criticised by the Society for the Protection of Ancient Buildings in Britain.

== Buildings and structures ==
=== Buildings ===
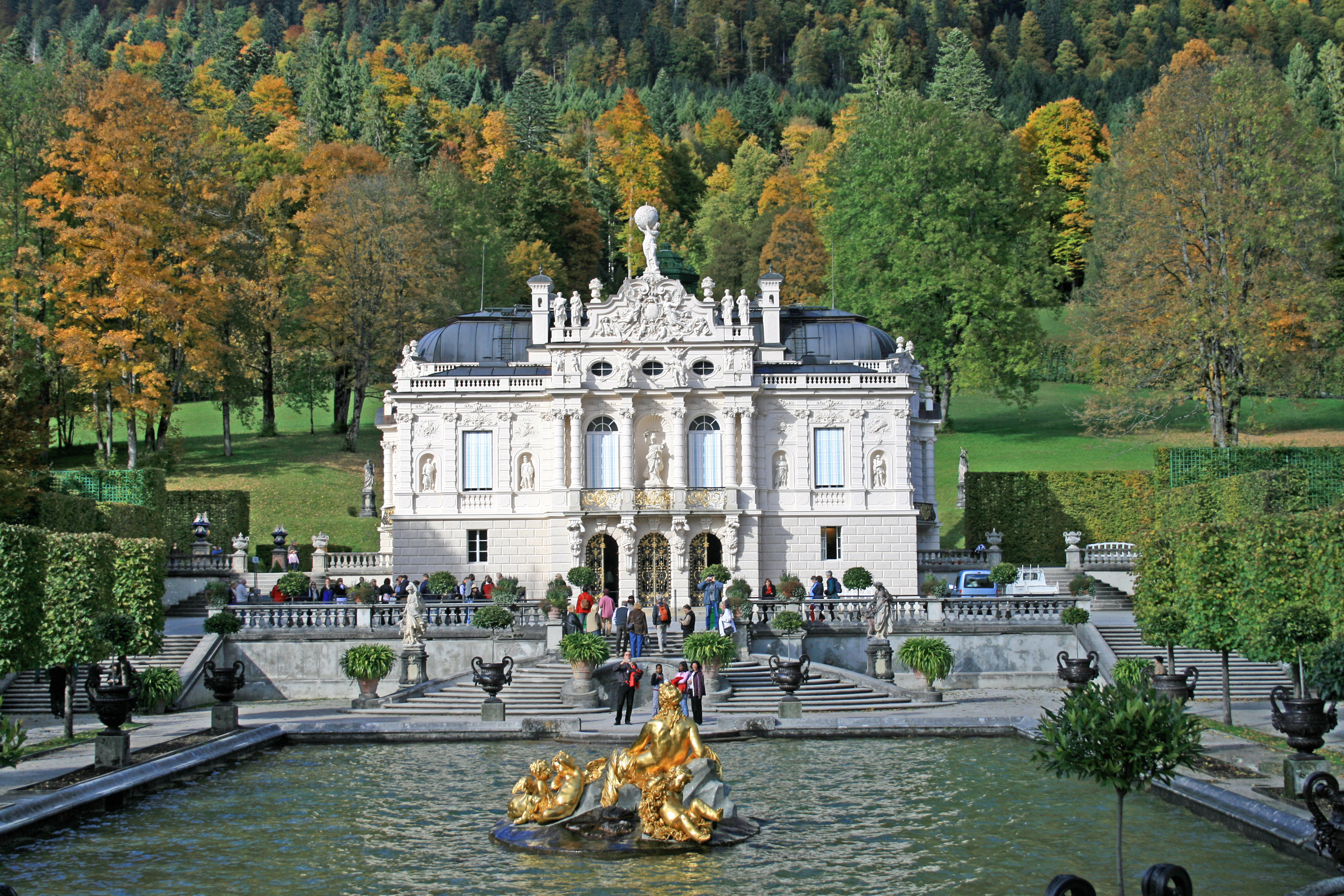
Linderhof Palace in Bavaria, Germany

- The Linderhof Palace in Bavaria, designed by Georg Dollman is completed.
- Grand Théâtre de Genève in Geneva, Switzerland opens on 2 October.
- St. Patrick's Cathedral (Manhattan) in New York City, designed by James Renwick Jr., is dedicated.
- The Votive Church, Vienna, Austria, designed by Heinrich von Ferstel, is dedicated.
- Connecticut State Capitol in Hartford, Connecticut, designed by Richard M. Upjohn, is completed.
- Healy Hall at Georgetown University in Washington, D.C., designed by Paul J. Pelz and John L. Smithmeyer, is completed.
- Provident Life & Trust Company in Philadelphia, Pennsylvania, designed by Frank Furness, is completed.

== Awards ==
- RIBA Royal Gold Medal – Marquis de Vogue
- Grand Prix de Rome, architecture: Victor-Auguste Blavette

== Births ==
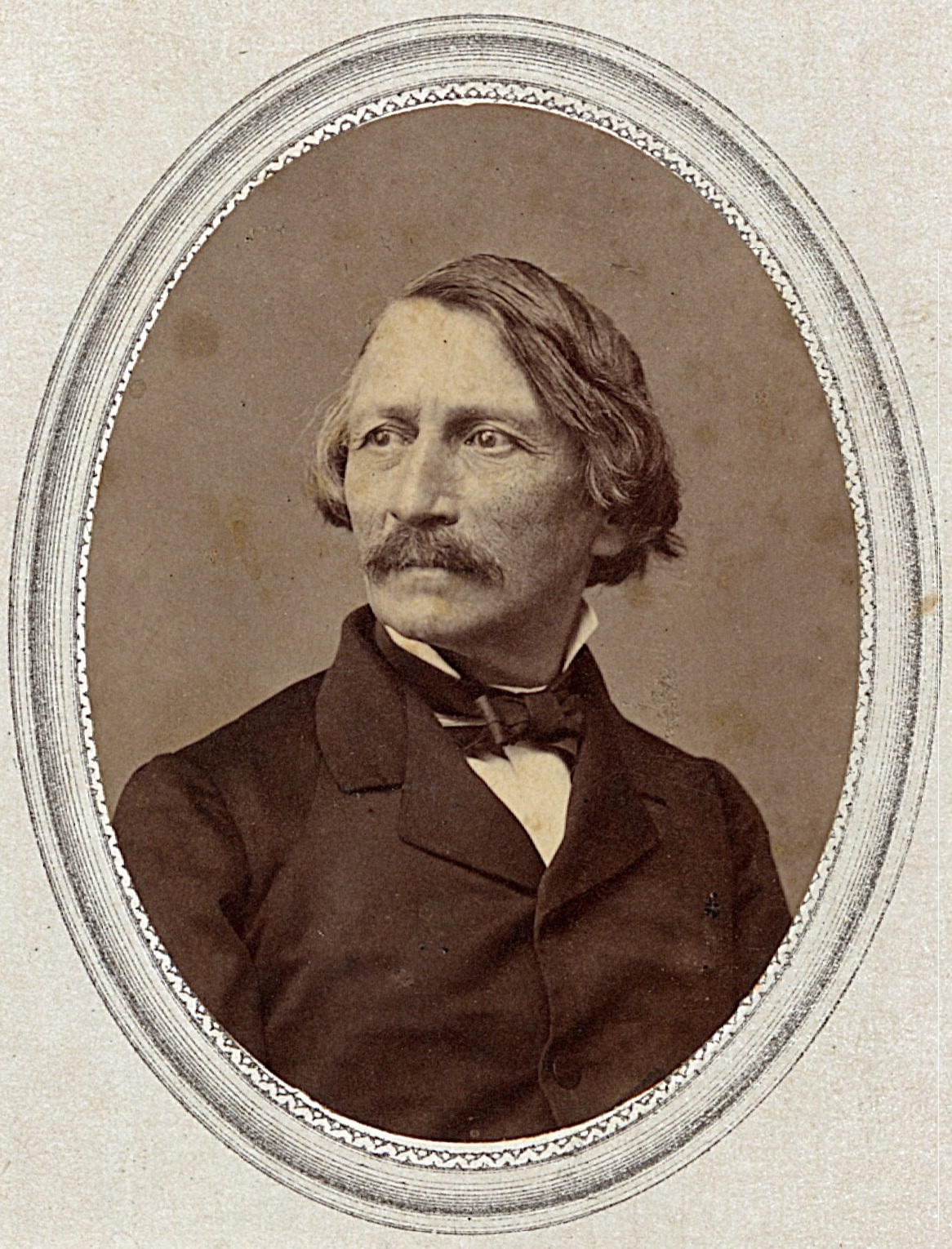
Gottfried Semper

- June 6 – Patrick Abercrombie, English town planner (died 1957)
- July 1 – H. Craig Severance, American architect (died 1941)
- September 16 – Josep Maria Jujol, Catalan architect (died 1949)

== Deaths ==
- May 15 – Gottfried Semper, German architect (born 1803)
- September 17 – Eugène Viollet-le-Duc, French architect and architectural theorist (born 1814)
