= 1721 in architecture =

The year 1721 in architecture involved some significant events.

== Buildings and structures ==
=== Buildings ===
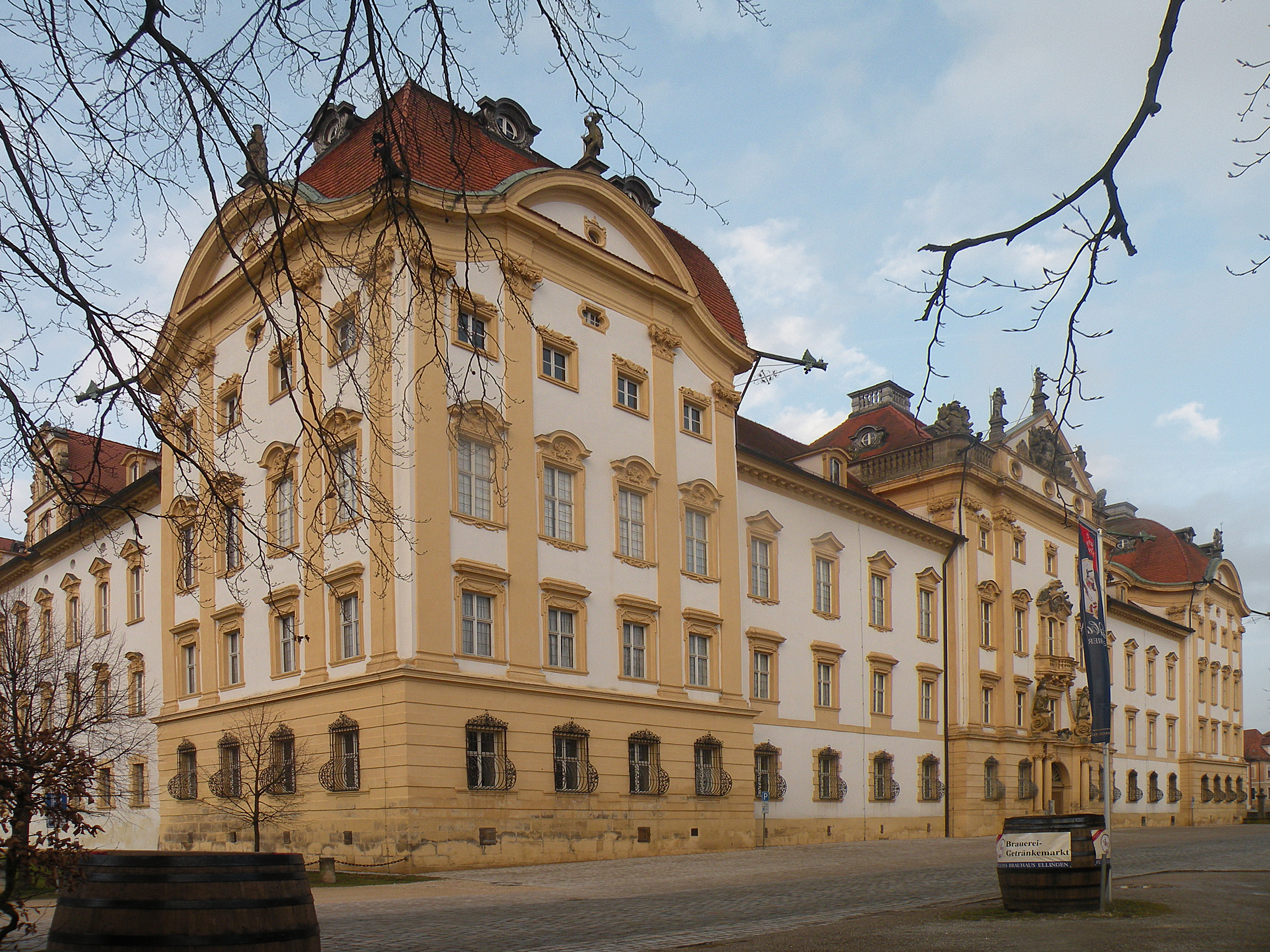
Ellingen Residence in Ellingen, Germany

- Bocking Windmill, Essex, England.
- 7 Burlington Gardens, later Queensberry House, London, Giacomo Leoni's first design for England
- Fort King George, along the Altamaha River in the modern-day US state of Georgia
- Ruthven Barracks in Scotland completed
- Jackson Square (New Orleans), New France
- Nazarbaug Palace, Gujarat, India
- Ellingen Residence in Ellingen, Bavaria completed in its Baroque form
- Písek Gate, Prague, Czech Republic
- Saint Paul the First Hermit Cathedral completed as parish church of San Pablo, Laguna, Philippines

== Awards ==
- Grand Prix de Rome, architecture: Philippe Buache.

== Births ==
- March 5 – John Adam, architect, brother of Robert Adam and James Adam (died 1792)
- March 26 - Nicolas Le Camus de Mézières, French architect (Bourse de Commerce) and author (died 1793)
- date unknown
  - Francesco Sabatini, Sicilian architect working in Spain (died 1797)
  - Thomas Sandby, English draughtsman, watercolour artist, architect, and teacher (died 1798)

== Deaths ==
- February 11 – Carlo Francesco Bizzaccheri, Italian architect (born 1656)
- June 11 – Sir Anthony Deane, English naval architect, shipbuilder and politician (born 1633)
