= 1817 in architecture =

The year 1817 in architecture involved some significant events.

== Buildings and structures ==
=== Buildings ===
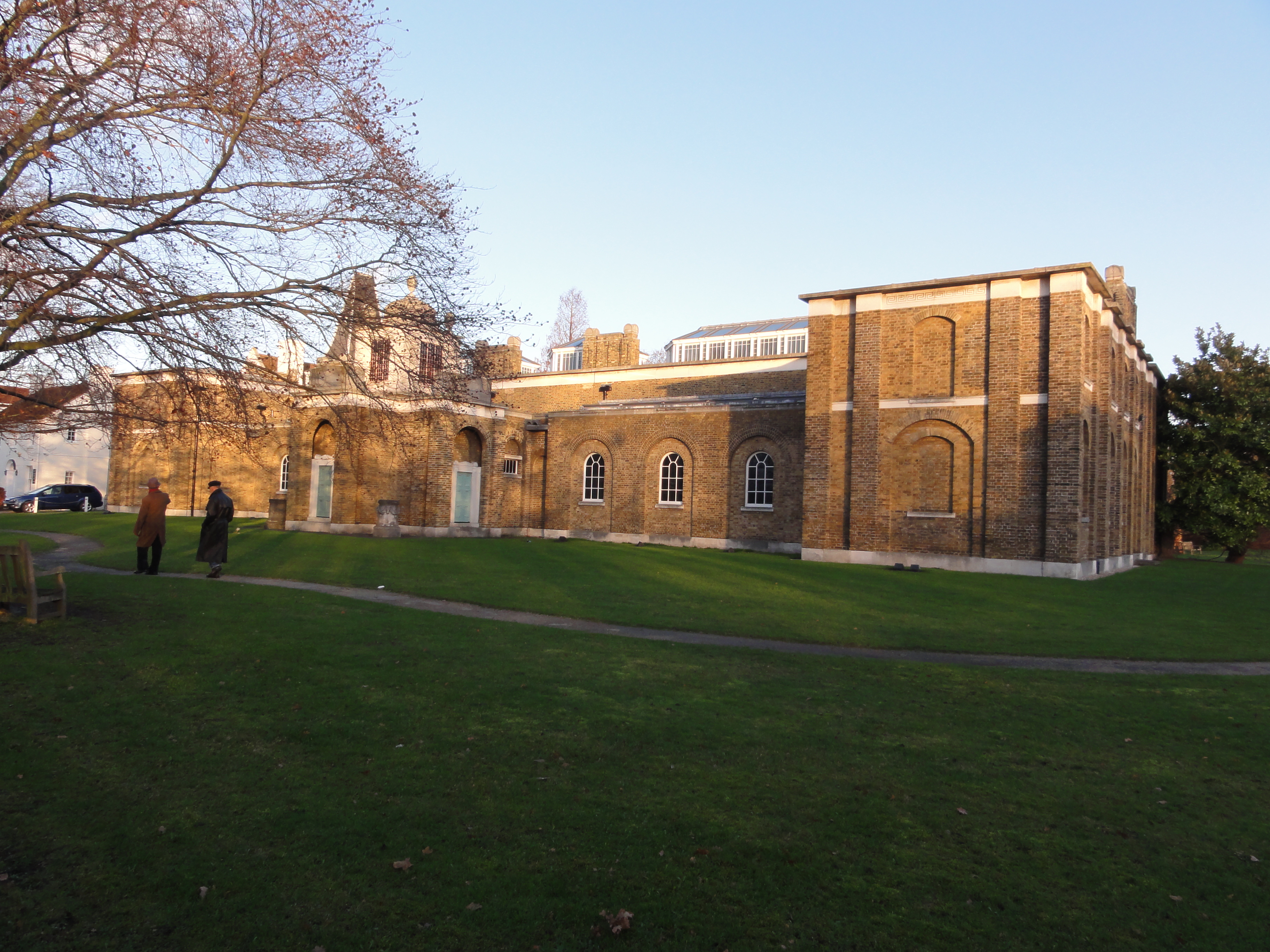
Dulwich Picture Gallery

- Dulwich Picture Gallery in London, designed by John Soane as the first purpose-built public art gallery in England, is completed and opened.
- The first Waterloo Bridge in London, designed by John Rennie the Elder, is completed.
- The Second Bank of the United States, in Philadelphia, designed by William Strickland, starts to operate.
- In Nassau, Bahamas, the lighthouse on Hog Island is built, replacing that at Fort Pincastle (built in 1793).
- Church of St. James the Great, Sedgley, in the Black Country of England, designed by Thomas Lee, is completed although not opened until 1823.
- Belsay Hall in Northumberland, England, designed for himself by Sir Charles Monck, 6th Baronet, probably with John Dobson, is completed.
- Lough Cutra Castle in Ireland, designed by John Nash, is completed.

== Publications ==
- Thomas Rickman – An Attempt to discriminate the Styles of English Architecture from the Conquest to the Reformation, the first systematic treatise on Gothic architecture.

== Awards ==
- Grand Prix de Rome, architecture: Antoine Garnaud.

== Births ==
- January 6 – James Joseph McCarthy, Irish architect (died 1882)
- April 9 – Alexander Thomson, Scottish Greek Revival architect (died 1875)
- April 15 – John Raphael Rodrigues Brandon, English Gothic Revival architect (died 1877)
- May 19 – George John Vulliamy, English architect (died 1886)
- June 2 – John Gibson, English architect (died 1892)
- July 5 – John Loughborough Pearson, British architect (died 1897)
- Thomas Thomas, Welsh chapel architect and minister (died 1888)

== Deaths ==
- July 19 – John Palmer, English architect working in Bath (born c.1738)
- September 8 – John Carter, English draughtsman and architect (born 1748)
- November 5 – Carl Haller von Hallerstein, German-born architect and archaeologist (born 1774)
