= Gulen Church =

Church in Vestland, Norway

- Gulen kyrkje
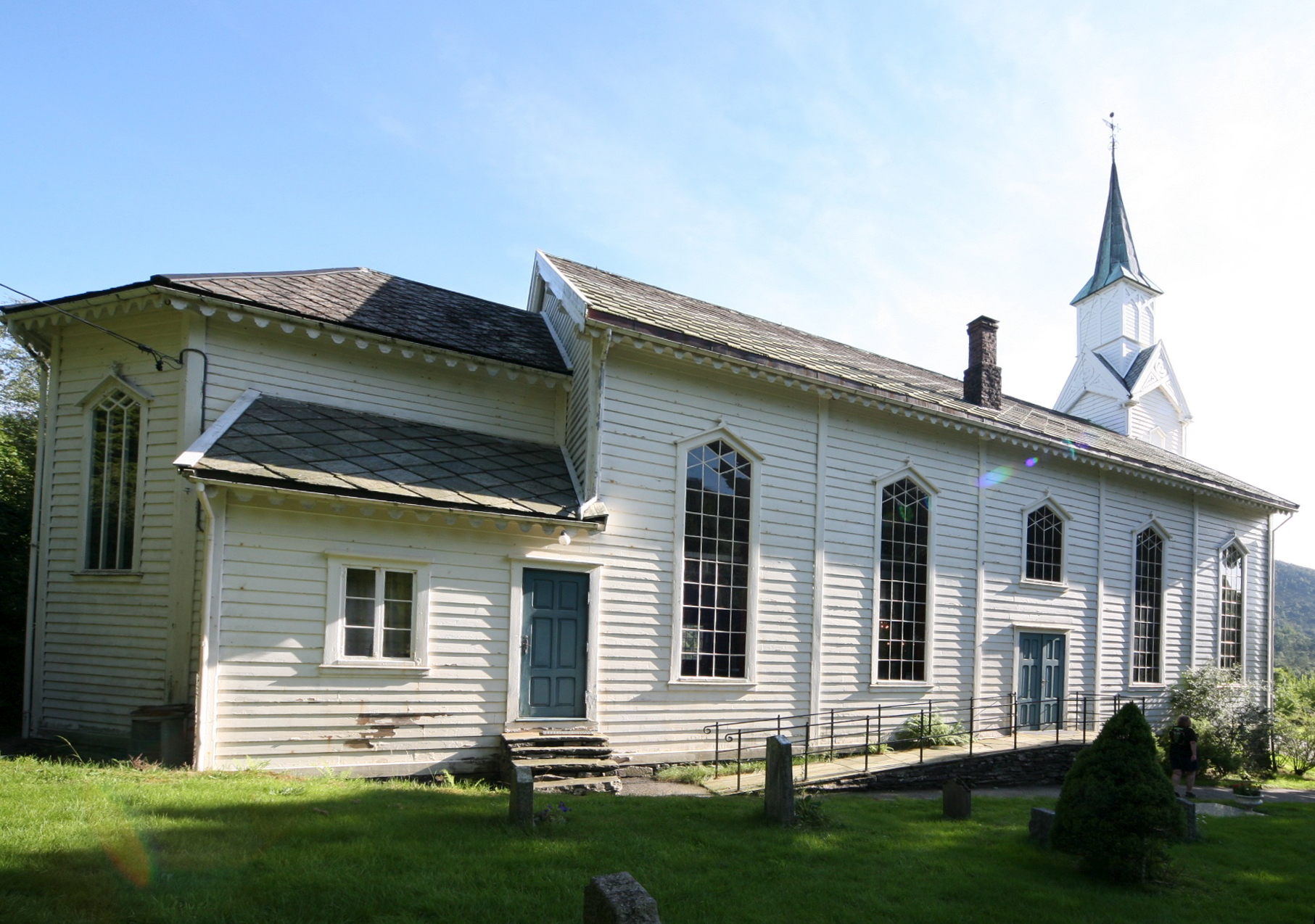
- View of the church Credit: Nina Aldin Thune
- Gulen Church
- 60°58′51″N 5°04′33″E
- Location: Gulen Municipality, Vestland
- Country: Norway
- Denomination: Church of Norway
- Previous denomination: Catholic Church
- Churchmanship: Evangelical Lutheran

History
- Former name: Evindvig Church
- Status: Parish church
- Founded: 12th century
- Consecrated: 13 Dec 1863

Architecture
- Functional status: Active
- Architect: Georg Andreas Bull
- Architectural type: Long church
- Completed: 1863 (163 years ago)

Specifications
- Capacity: 700
- Materials: Wood

Administration
- Diocese: Bjørgvin bispedømme
- Deanery: Nordhordland prosti
- Parish: Gulen
- Norwegian Cultural Heritage Site
- Type: Church
- Status: Listed
- ID: 84447

Gulen Church (Norwegian: Gulen kyrkje) is a parish church of the Church of Norway in Gulen Municipality in Vestland county, Norway. It is located in the village of Eivindvik. It is the church for the Gulen parish which is part of the Nordhordland prosti (deanery) in the Diocese of Bjørgvin. The white, wooden church was built in a long church design in 1863 using plans drawn up by the architect Georg Andreas Bull. The church seats about 700 people. The church stands on a hill in central Eivindvik, with magnificent views towards the Gulafjorden.

== History ==
The earliest existing historical records of the church date back to the year 1327, but the church was not new that year. Eivindvik is regarded as a very old church site, perhaps one of the oldest in the country. The two stone crosses which stand close to the church are over a thousand years old. This is probably where the first Christians in the area gathered, until they built themselves a church. The first church in the village of Eivindvik was a wooden stave church which may have been built in the 12th century. For centuries (until 1890), the church was called Evindvig Church (Old Norse: Œyvindarviik), using the old spelling of the village of Eivindvik.

During the late 1500s, the old church was torn down and replaced on the same site by a small timber-framed long church.

In 1814, this church served as an election church (Norwegian: valgkirke). Together with more than 300 other parish churches across Norway, it was a polling station for elections to the 1814 Norwegian Constituent Assembly which wrote the Constitution of Norway. This was Norway's first national elections. Each church parish was a constituency that elected people called "electors" who later met together in each county to elect the representatives for the assembly that was to meet at Eidsvoll Manor later that year.

By the early 1800s, the vicar Niels Griis Alstrup Dahl (1778–1852) was an avid proponent of building a new church in Eivindvik, and he worked extensively towards that goal. When he died in 1852, the reaction of many in the community was that it important to build the new church to pay tribute to the memory of Dahl. The local council sent the government an application to build a church that seats 700 people. In 1860, a royal decree was handed down that gave the municipality permission to build a church of that size. Georg Andreas Bull was hired to design the new building and Ole Syslak was hired as the lead builder. The municipal council then resolved that the ground work should be performed by compulsory work with crews of six men daily, two days per landowning farmer and one day per farm worker. It wasn't until 1863 that work commenced. The old church was torn down and replaced with the present church which is located on the same site. The church was consecrated on 13 December 1863 by the local Dean Thomas Erichsen. The new church was large, with a nave measuring 20 by 12.5 metres (66 ft × 41 ft) and a choir measuring 7.6 by 7.8 metres (25 ft × 26 ft). The choir is unique in that it is made semi-octagonal in shape (making up five sides of the eight). The 5-by-4.3-metre (16 ft × 14 ft) church porch sits at the west end of the nave.

In 1890, the municipality, parish, and church all changed their names to Gulen, after the old Gulating assembly. The village, however, retained the historic name Eivindvik. For the 75th anniversary in 1938, the church was renovated and the interior changed somewhat according to plans by Johan Lindstrøm. In 1963, a sacristy was built on the south side of the choir and a new coat room and bathroom were also constructed at the same time.

== Media gallery ==
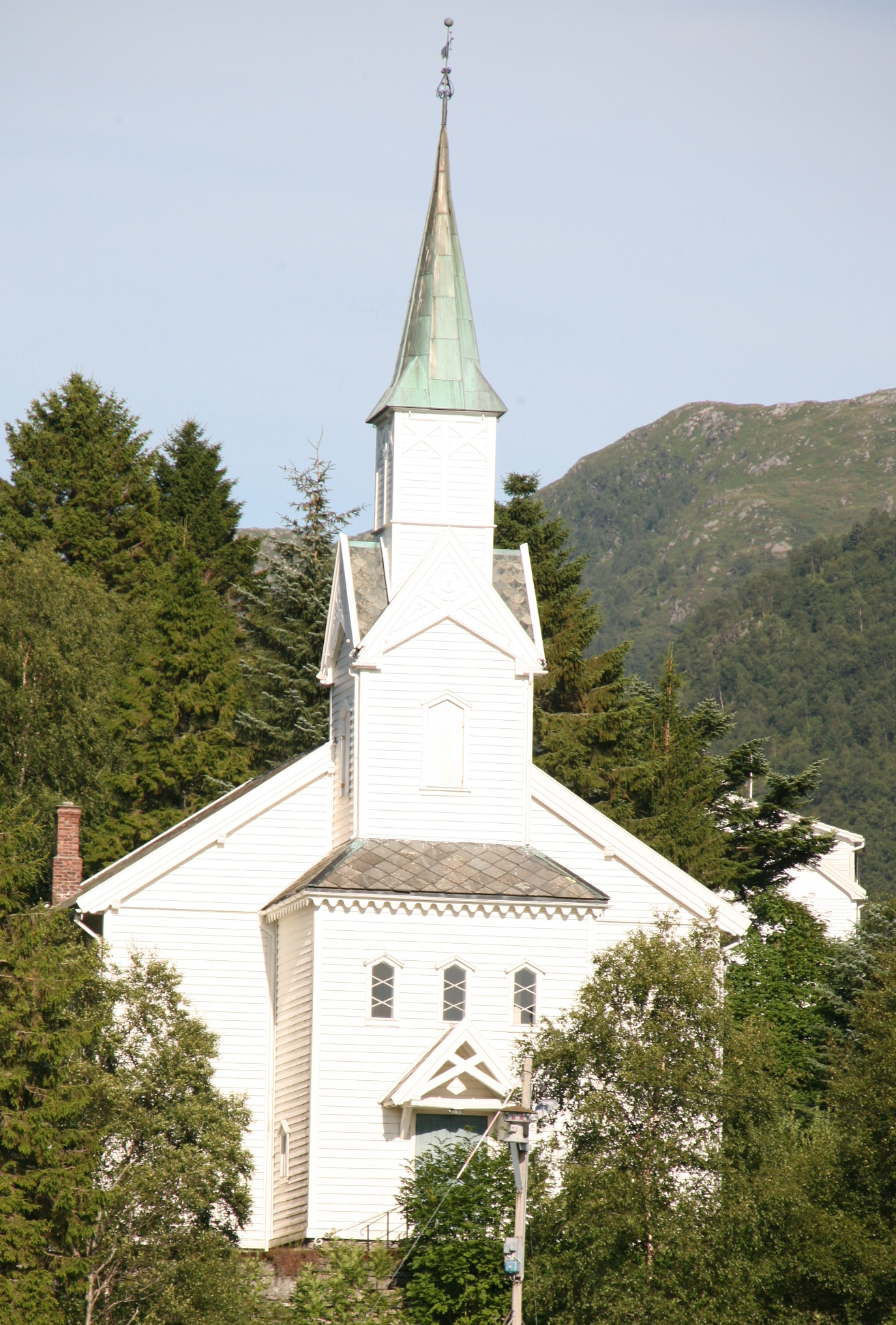

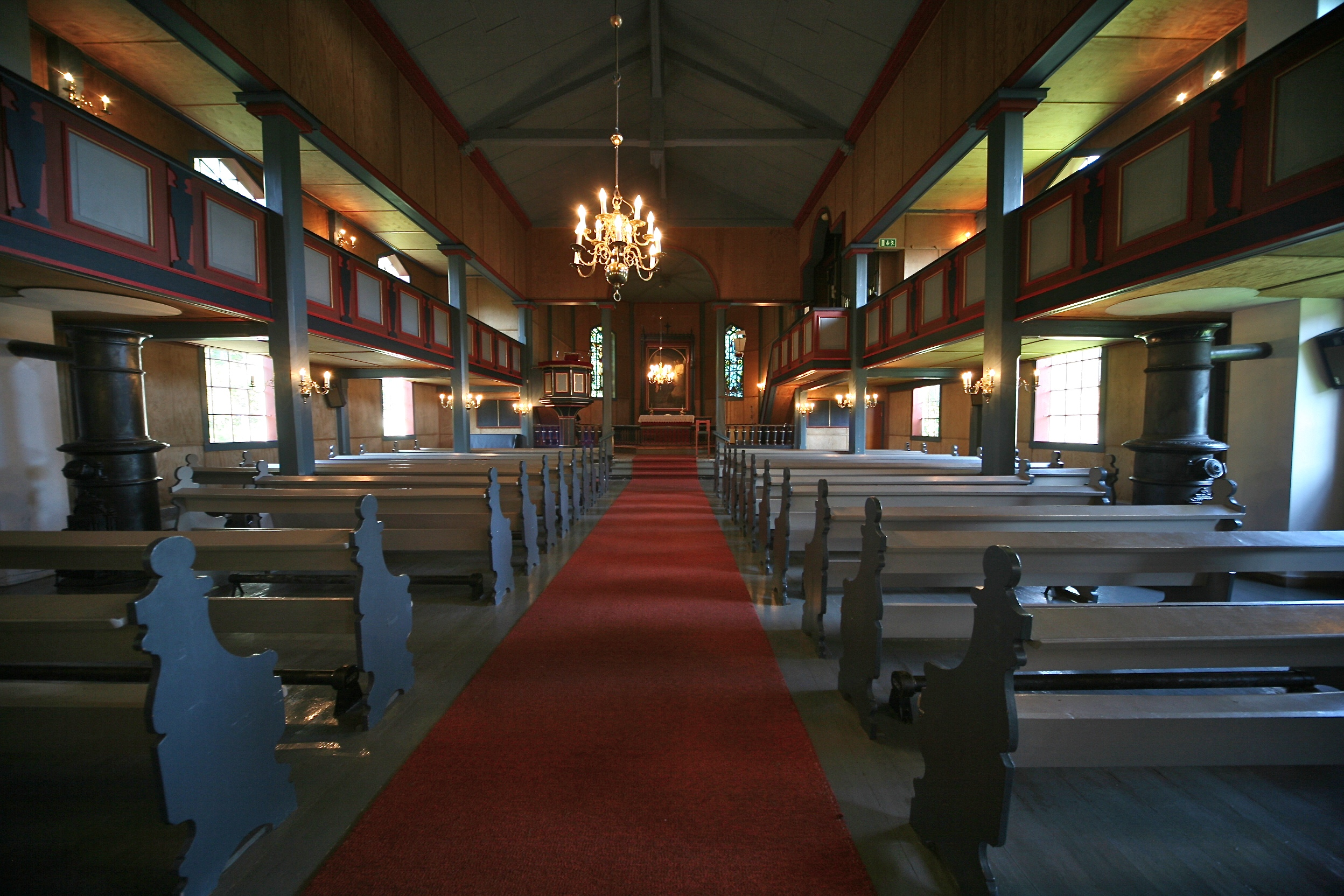

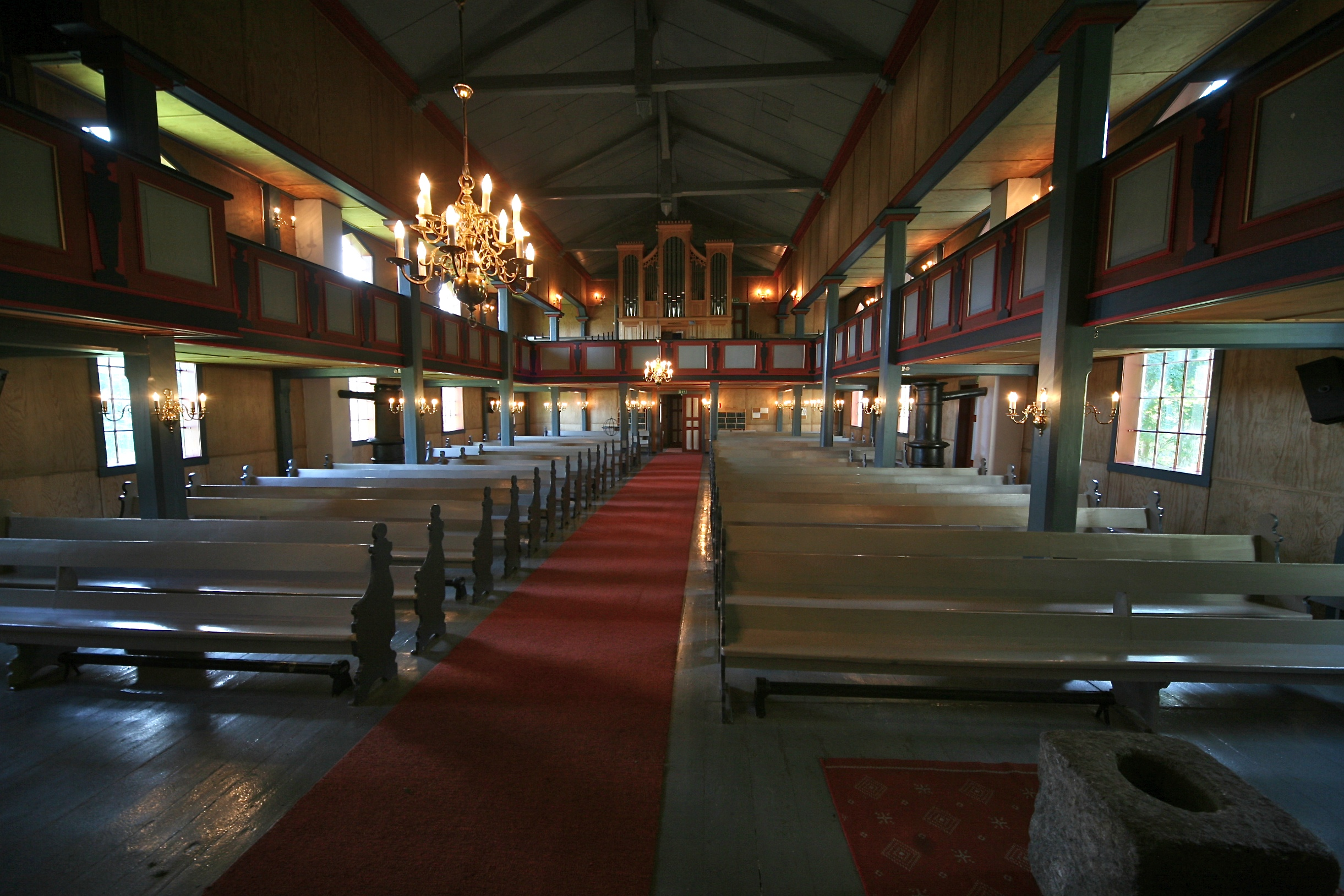

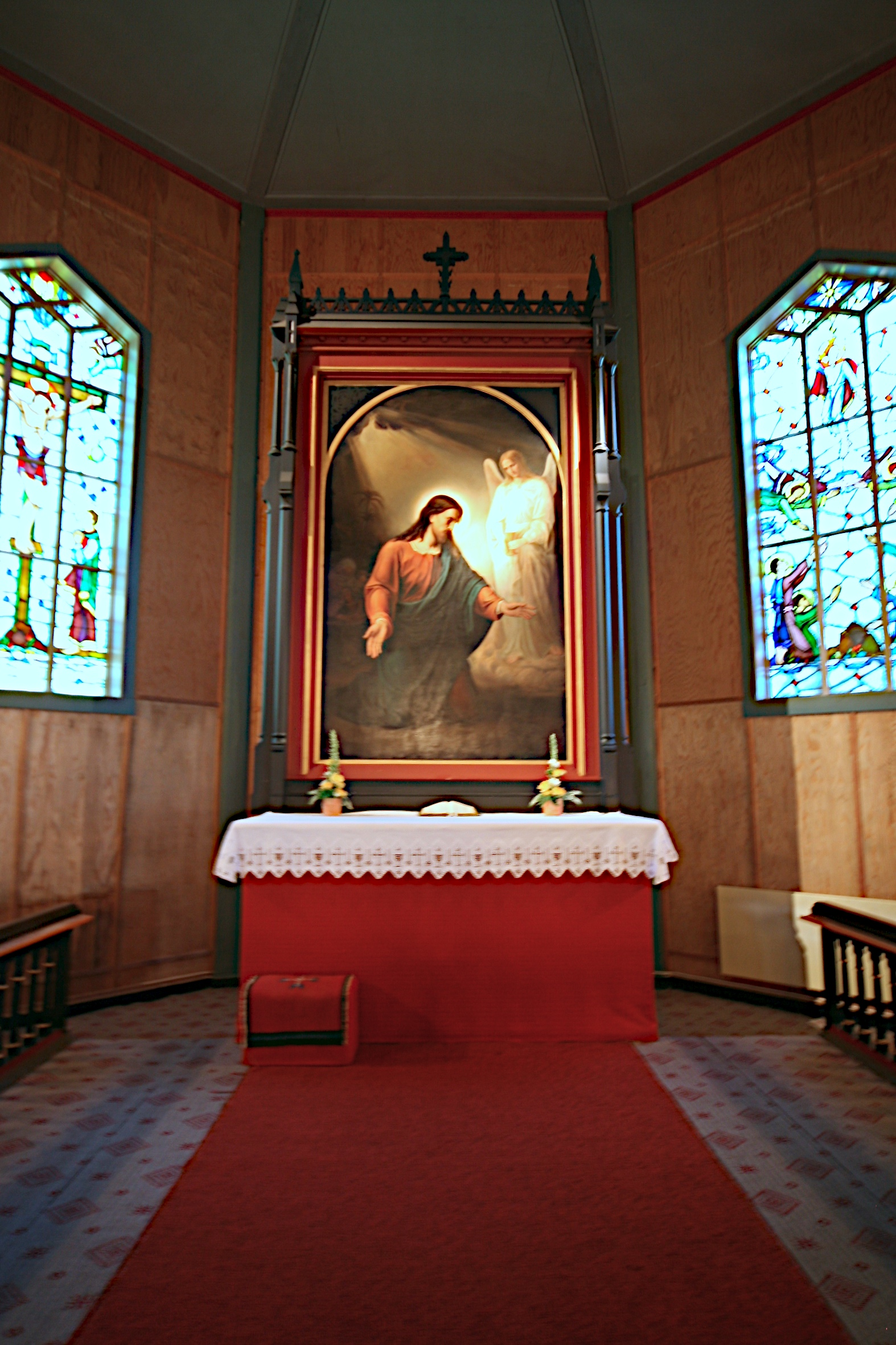

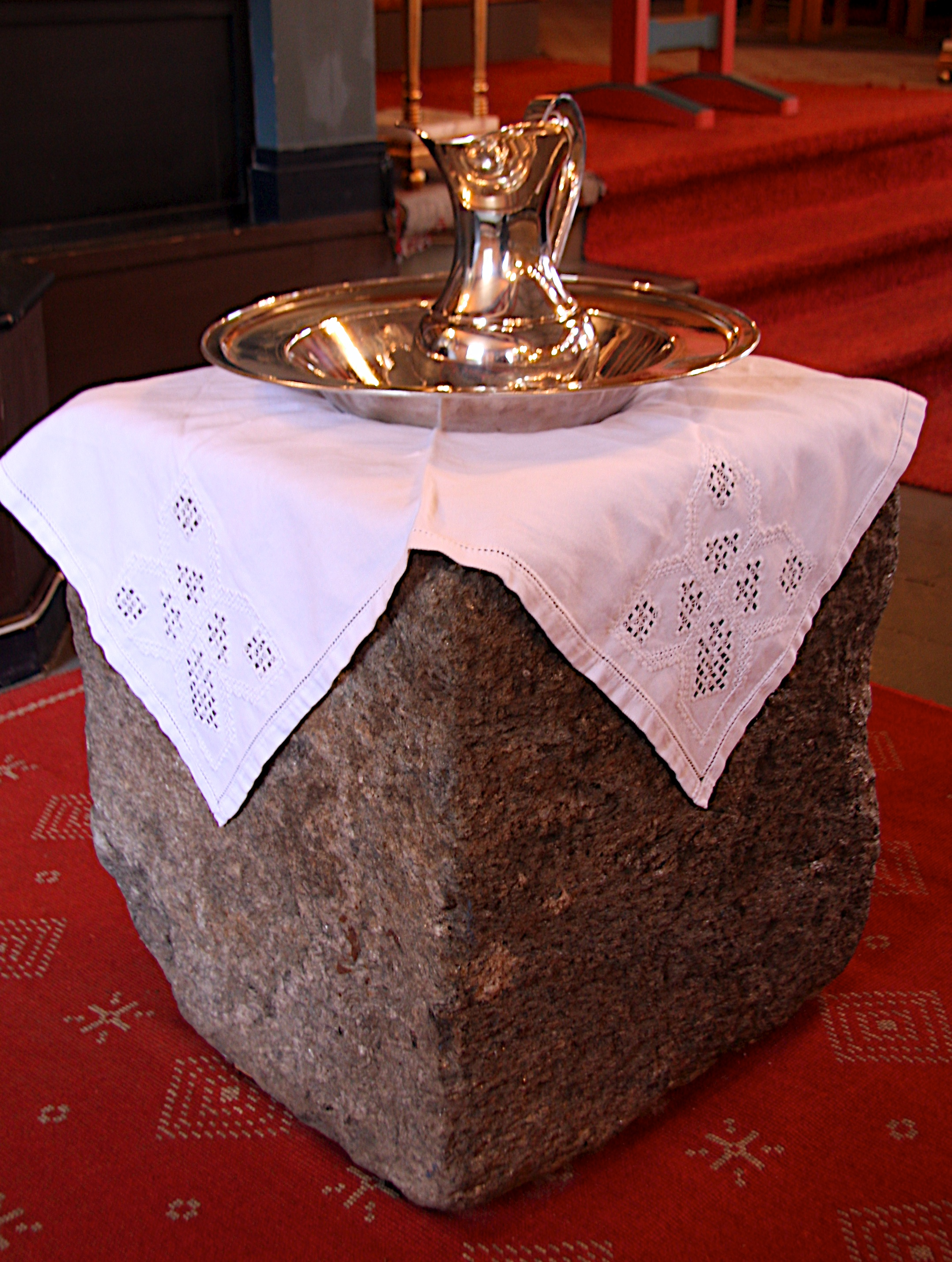

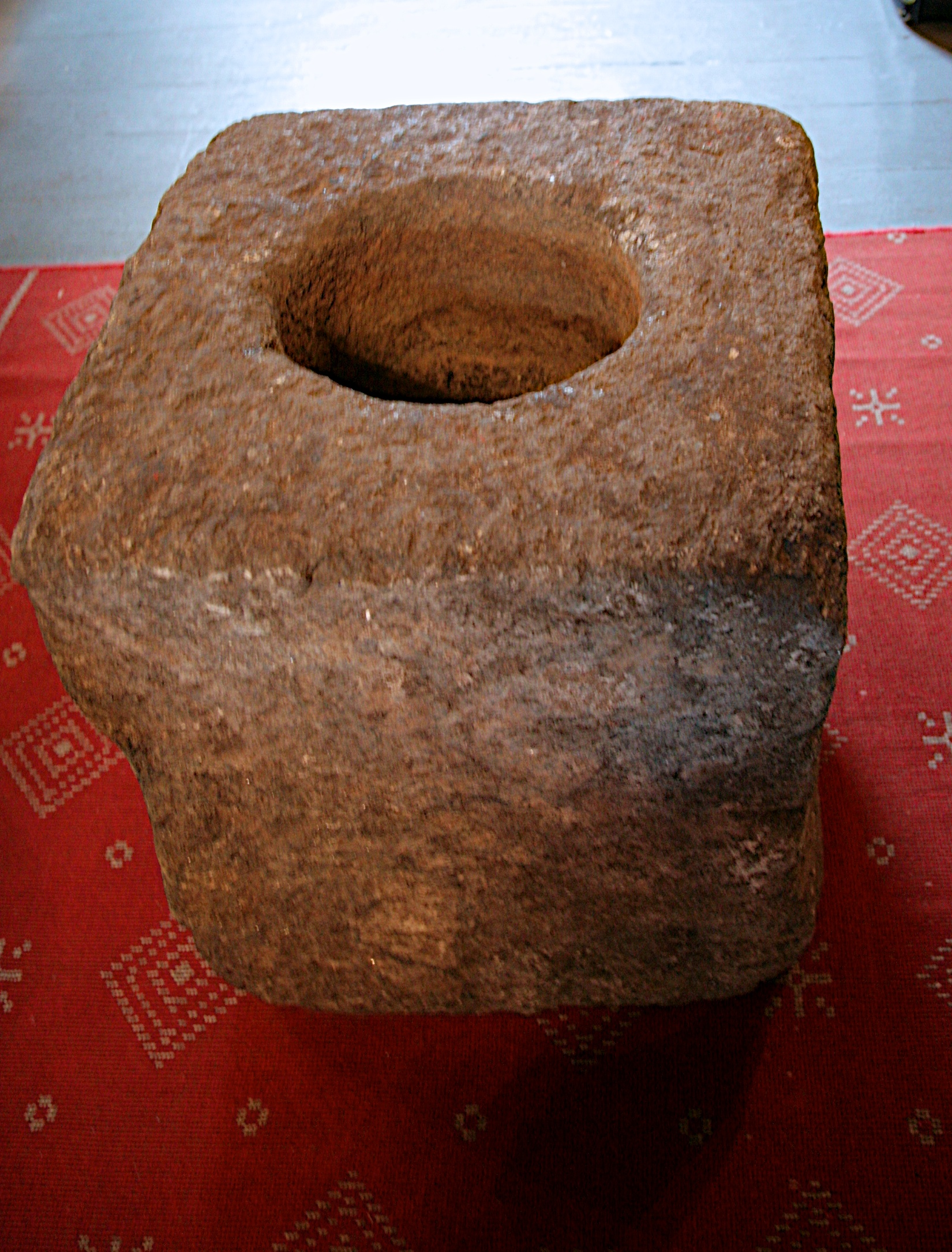

== See also ==
- List of churches in Bjørgvin
