= 1730 in architecture =

The year 1730 in architecture involved some significant events.

== Buildings and structures ==
=== Buildings ===
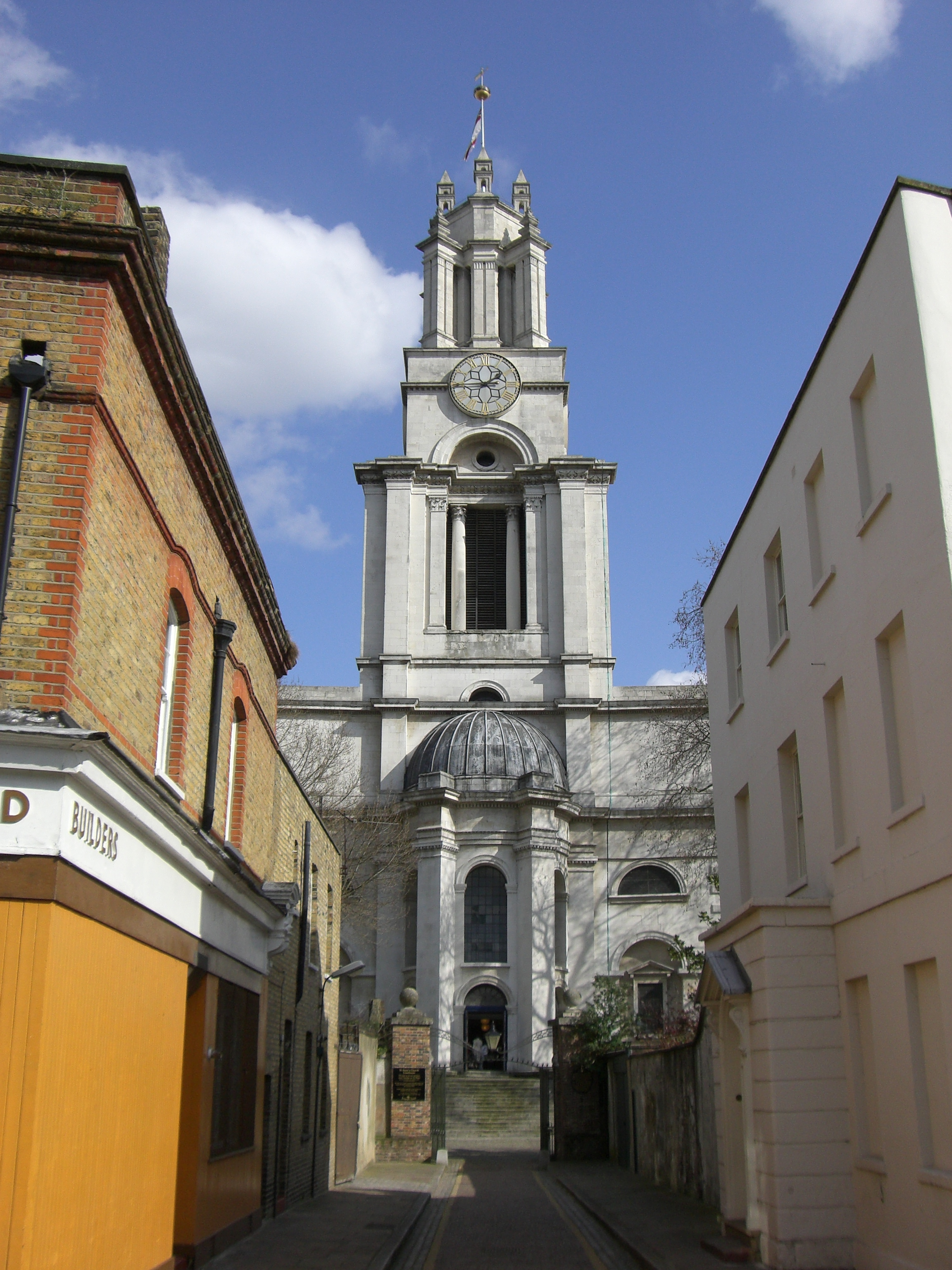
St Anne's Limehouse

- Annenhof Palace in the Lefortovo District of Moscow, designed by Francesco Bartolomeo Rastrelli.
- The Column of Victory at Blenheim Palace in England, designed by Roger Morris and Henry Herbert, is completed.
- Zeughaus (arsenal, modern-day Deutsches Historisches Museum) on Unter den Linden in Berlin (Prussia), to a design originated by Johann Arnold Nering in 1695 (the year of his death) and continued successively by Martin Grünberg, Andreas Schlüter and Jean de Bodt, is completed.
- Senate House (University of Cambridge), designed by James Gibbs and James Burrough, is completed.
- St Anne's Limehouse, designed by Nicholas Hawksmoor, and St Paul's, Deptford, designed by Thomas Archer, are completed for the Commission for Building Fifty New Churches in London; and Hawksmoor's St. George's, Bloomsbury, is consecrated.
- Approximate date – Clothiers' houses in Fore Street, Trowbridge, England – No. 64 and No. 70 (Parade House) – are built.

== Births ==
- February 6 – Januarius Zick, German painter and architect (d. 1797)
- February 22 – Domenico Merlini, Polish-Italian architect (d. 1797)
- date unknown – Marie-Joseph Peyre, French architect (d. 1785)

== Deaths ==
- December 31 – Carlo Gimach, Maltese architect, engineer and poet (b. 1651)
- date unknown – Leonardo de Figueroa, Spanish architect (b. c.1650)
