= 1797 in architecture =

The year 1797 in architecture involved some significant events.

== Buildings and structures ==
=== Buildings ===
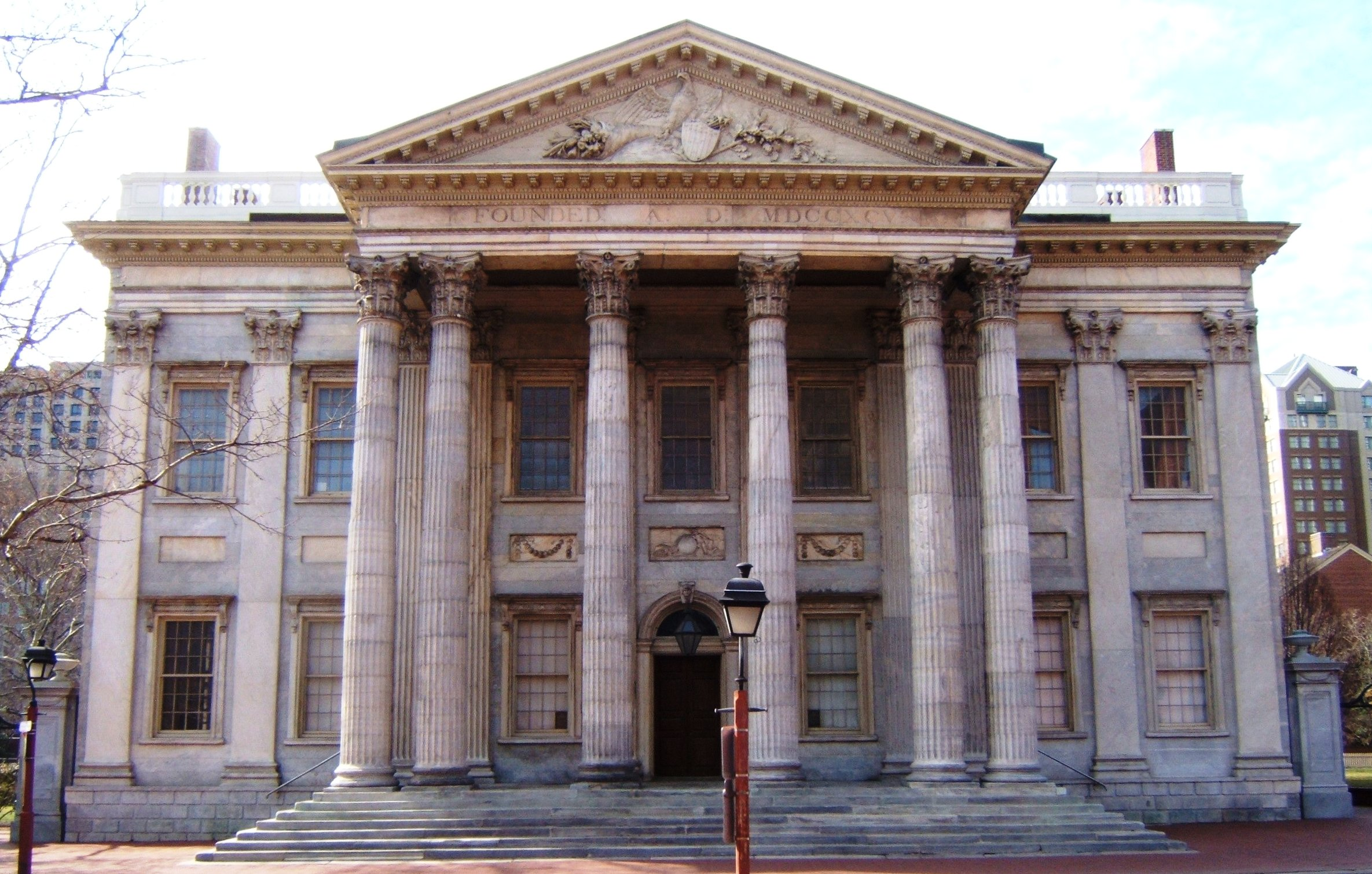
First Bank of the United States, Philadelphia

- Ditherington Flax Mill, in Shrewsbury, England, is completed; by the end of the 20th century it will be the oldest iron-framed building in the world and is seen as the world's first skyscraper.
- First Bank of the United States in Philadelphia, Pennsylvania, designed by Samuel Blodgett, is completed (begun in 1795).
- Old City Hall (Lancaster, Pennsylvania) is completed.
- Hassan Basha Mosque in Oran is built.
- St Mary's Church, Banbury in England, designed by S. P. Cockerell, is completed.
- Palace of Shaki Khans in Shaki, Azerbaijan is built.

== Births ==
- May 3 – George Webster, English architect (died 1864)
- October 8 – Ludwig Förster, German-born Austrian religious architect (died 1863)

== Deaths ==
- February 19 – Francesco Sabatini, Italian-born architect (born 1721)
- October 4 – Anthony Keck, English architect (born 1726)
