= Karlsruhe Synagogue =

Former synagogue in Karlsruhe, Germany

- German: Synagoge Karlsruhe
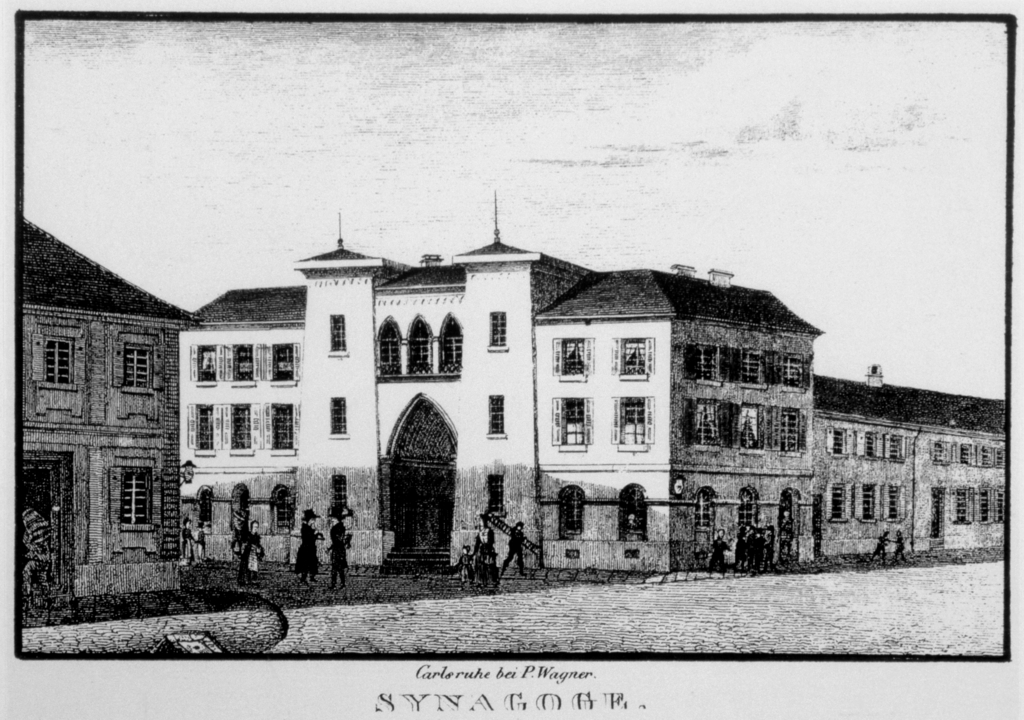
- The former synagogue, in c. 1810, showing Egyptian Revival-style pylons

- Location of the former synagogue in Baden-Württemberg

Religion
- Affiliation: Judaism (former)
- Rite: Nusach Ashkenaz
- Ecclesiastical or organisational status: Synagogue (1798–1871)
- Status: Demolished

Location
- Location: Karlsruhe, Baden-Württemberg
- Country: Germany
- Coordinates: 49°00′35″N 8°24′31″E

Architecture
- Architect: Friedrich Weinbrenner
- Type: Synagogue architecture
- Style: Egyptian Revival
- Completed: 1798
- Demolished: 1871

The Karlsruhe Synagogue (German: Synagoge Karlsruhe) was a Jewish congregation and synagogue, located in Karlsruhe, in the state of Baden-Württemberg, Germany. Designed by Friedrich Weinbrenner in the Egyptian Revival style, the synagogue was completed in 1798 and demolished in 1871.

== History ==
An early building by Weinbrenner, the synagogue was "...the first large Egyptian building to be erected since antiquity." It was "… the first public building (that is, not a folly, stage set, or funeral monument) in the Egyptian Revival style." The pair of tall pylons were copied from the temple at Karnak.

The structure stood until 1871, following a fire earlier that year. A new synagogue was completed in 1875, and it was destroyed by Nazis on November 9, 1938, during Kristallnacht.

== See also ==
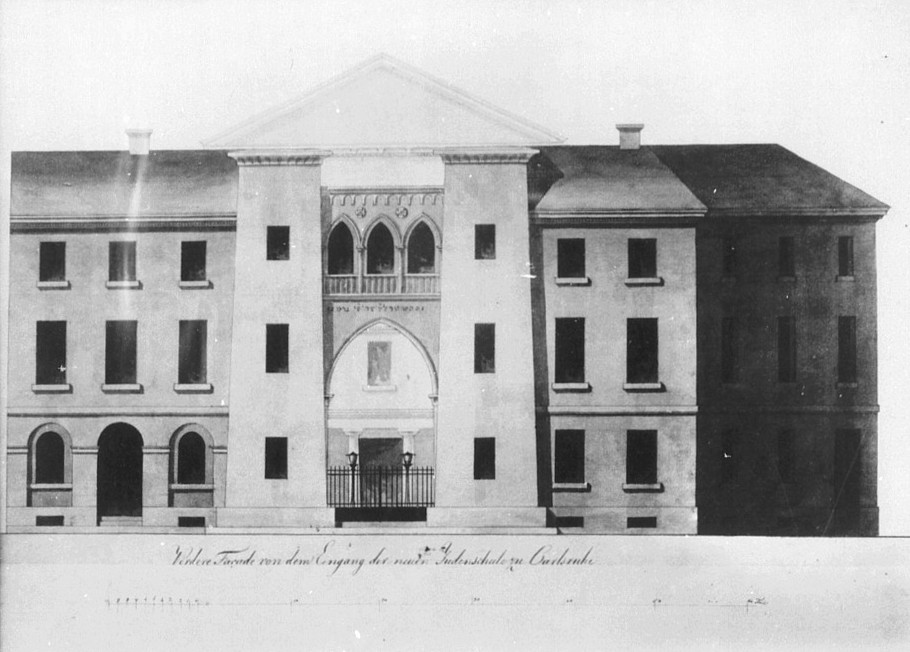
Weinbrenner's sketch of the building

- History of the Jews in Germany
- List of synagogues in Germany (in German)
