= Church of St James the Great, Sedgley =

Church of St. James the Great
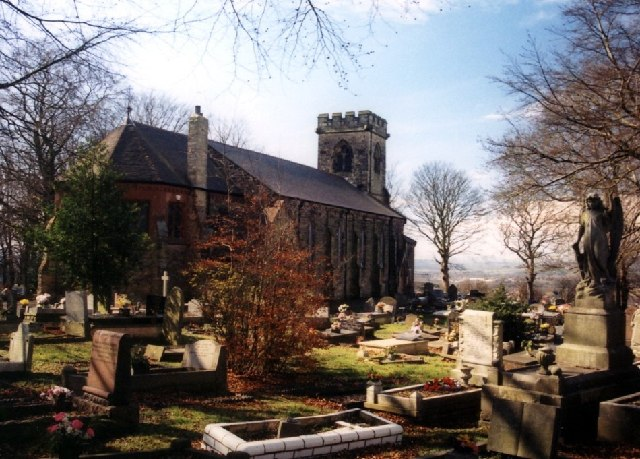
- Church of St James the Great in Lower Gornal in 2005
- Interactive map of the Church of St. James the Great area

General information
- Type: Church
- Architectural style: Gothic
- Location: Lower Gornal, Dudley, England
- Coordinates: 52.5194°N 2.1245°W
- Construction started: 1815
- Completed: 1817

Design and construction
- Architect: Thomas Lee
- Awards and prizes: Grade II listed building

The Church of St. James the Great is an Anglican church in the Lower Gornal area of Sedgley in the West Midlands, England. The church is Grade II listed, a status it received on 11 March 1996. It is located within the Anglican Diocese of Worcester.

Construction of the church commenced in 1815 and was completed in 1817 although it came into use in 1823. It was designed by Thomas Lee and built of local yellow stone with slate and tile roofs. The church was enlarged in 1837 to add north and south porches. It was refitted in 1849 with the addition of a chancel. The chancel was rebuilt and an organ was added in 1899 and in 1930, the top section of the tower was rebuilt. The north window of the apse was produced by Ninian Comper in 1902.

It is not to be confused with St James's Church at Eve Hill in nearby Dudley, some two miles away.
