= 1793 in architecture =

The year 1793 in architecture involved some significant architectural events and new buildings.

== Events ==
- March 8 – The Bishop of Popayán, making a pastoral visit to Rionegro, Antioquia, Colombia, finds "evil spirits" in the church, and arranges the construction of a new cathedral, the Concatedral de San Nicolás el Magno.
- August 8 – In Paris, France, the Académie royale d'architecture is suspended by the revolutionary National Convention, which decrees the abolition of the national academies.
- November 25 – The Prince Regent lays the foundation stone of the Chapel Royal, Brighton.
- date unknown
  - English architect Thomas Baldwin, having been appointed as the Bath City Architect in 1775, is dismissed as a result of his rivalry with John Palmer of Bath.
  - The Frydenlund mansion near Copenhagen, Denmark, designed by Caspar Frederik Harsdorff, is destroyed by fire. The Crown sells the estate to Karl Adolf Boheman, who refurbishes and expands Johan Cornelius Krieger's original house with the assistance of Jørgen Henrich Rawert.

== Buildings and structures ==
=== Buildings ===
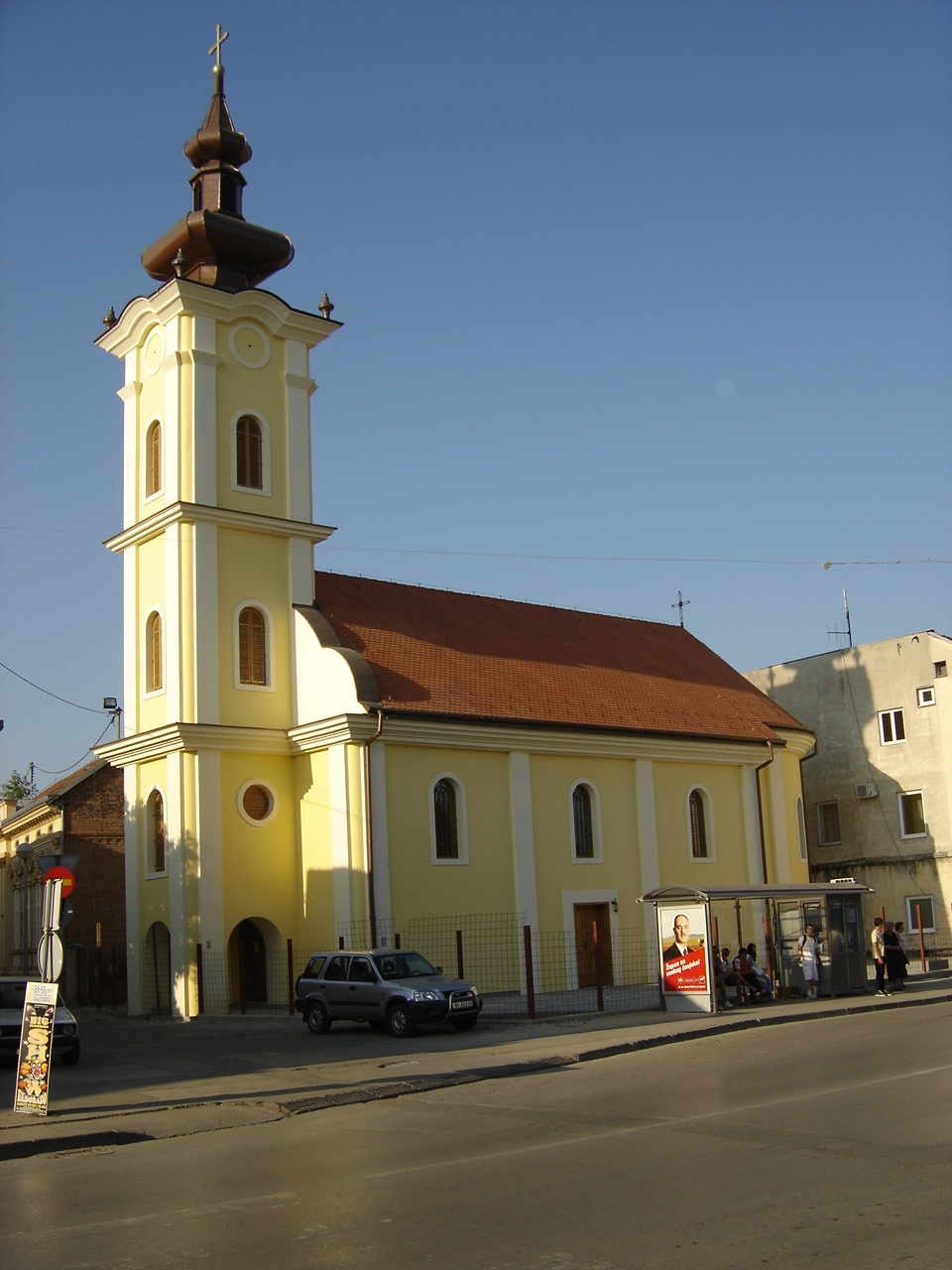
Church of Pentecost, Vinkovci (reconstructed)

- Church of Pentecost, Vinkovci, Croatia.
- Lansdown Crescent, Bath, England, designed by John Palmer.
- George Washington's sixteen-sided barn (16 sides), the earliest recorded barn of this type.
- The West Boston Bridge, connecting Boston's West End to Cambridgeport: it spans 180 piers, and is 3,483 feet (1,100 m) long.
- Puente Nuevo, Ronda, Spain, spanning the Tajo gorge between the old and new sections of the town, designed by Martín de Aldehuela and begun in 1751.
- Fort Pincastle, Nassau, Bahamas, built of native limestone, in the shape of an old paddle-wheel steamer: Fort Pincastle serves as a lighthouse for a quarter century until the lighthouse on Hog Island starts operating in 1817.

== Births ==
- March 23 – Vicko Andrić, Croatian architect (died 1866)
- December 16 – Frederik Ferdinand Friis, Danish architect, professor and Royal Building Inspector (died 1865)
- date unknown
  - Thomas Parke, architect, builder, journalist and political figure in Upper Canada (died 1864)
  - Richard Shackleton Pope, Bristol-based architect (died 1884)

== Deaths ==
- July 5 – Peter Anton von Verschaffelt, Flemish sculptor and architect (born 1710)
- July 27 - Nicolas Le Camus de Mézières, French architect (Bourse de Commerce) and author (born 1721)
- October 26 – Karl Blank, Russian Baroque and Neoclassical architect (born 1728)
