= Friedrich Weinbrenner =

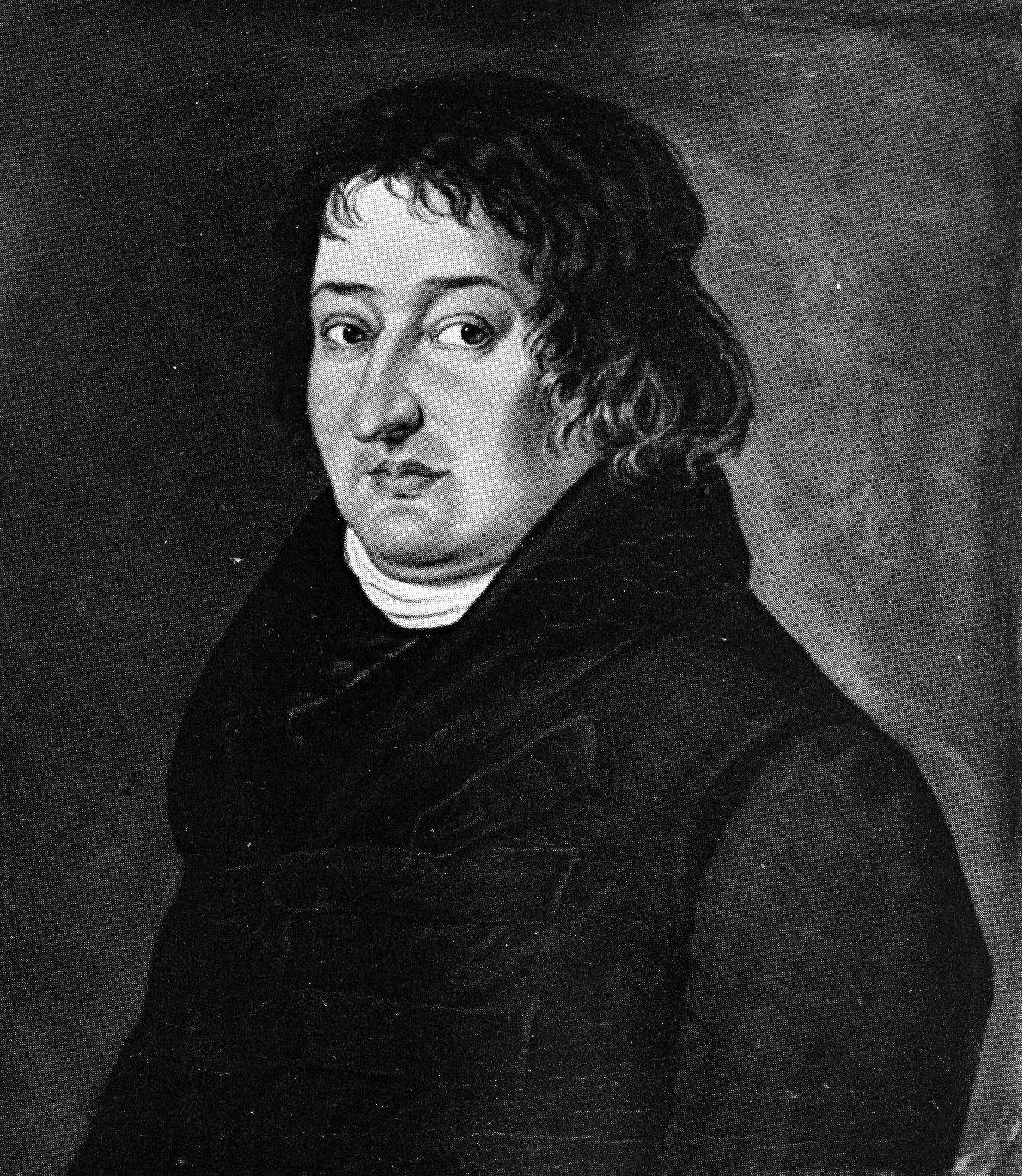
- Friedrich Weinbrenner
- Born: 24 November 1766; Karlsruhe, Margraviate of Baden
- Died: 1 March 1826 (aged 59)
- Occupations: Architect; City planner

Signature
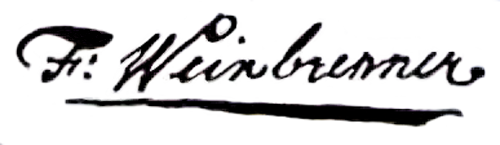

Friedrich Weinbrenner (24 November 1766 – 1 March 1826) was a German architect and city planner admired for his mastery of classical style.

== Birth and education ==
Weinbrenner was born in Karlsruhe, and began his career apprenticed to his father, a carpenter. He worked as a builder in Zürich and Lausanne starting from 1788. He arrived to Vienna in 1790 and began his study of architecture, largely self-taught. In 1790–91 he studied at the Bauakademie of Vienna and Dresden, then, in 1791–92, spent several months in Berlin where he was exposed to Palladian architecture. Carl Gotthard Langhans (1732–1808), David Gilly (1748–1808) and Hans Christian Genelli (1763–1823) were influential in the formation of Weinbrenner's architectural thought. He spent the years 1792 to 1797 in Italy, where he was part of the circle around Carl Ludwig Fernow (1763–1808) in Rome. His study of the ancient buildings of Rome, Pompeii, Herculaneum and, especially, Paestum were foundational to his later work. He was among the first German architects to see the early Doric buildings at Paestum.

== Career ==
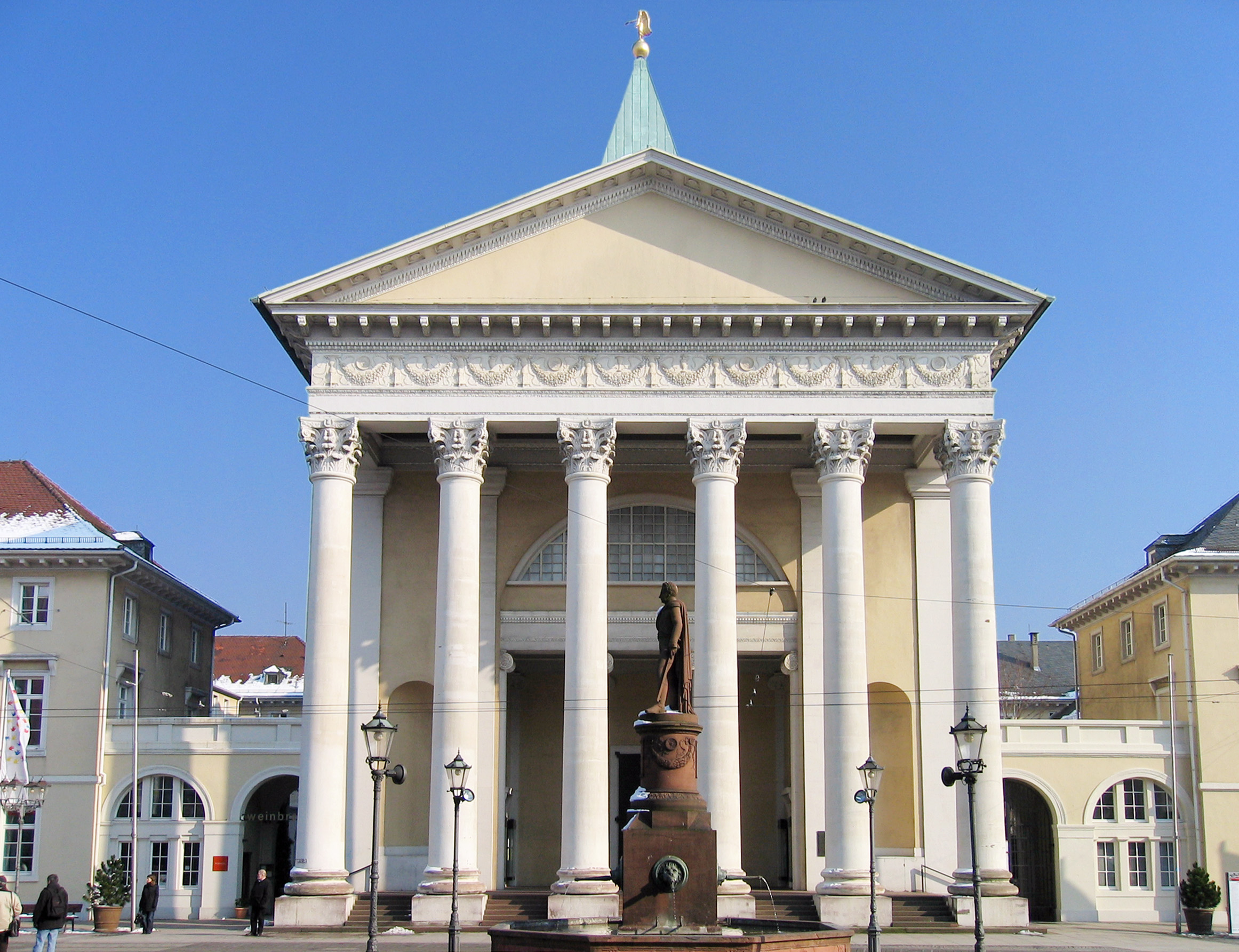
Karlsruhe Protestant Church, 1807–16

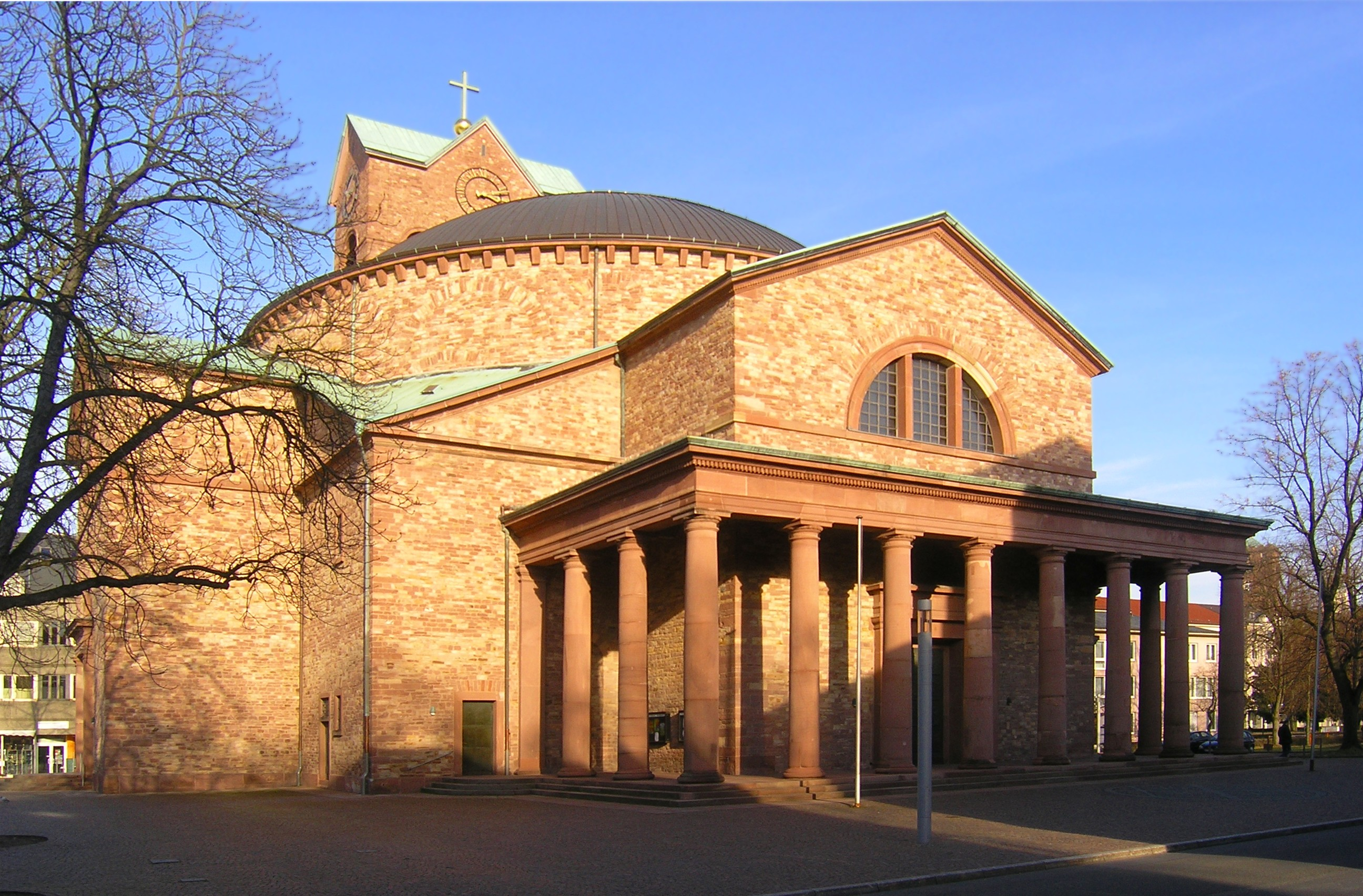
Karlsruhe Catholic Church, 1808–14

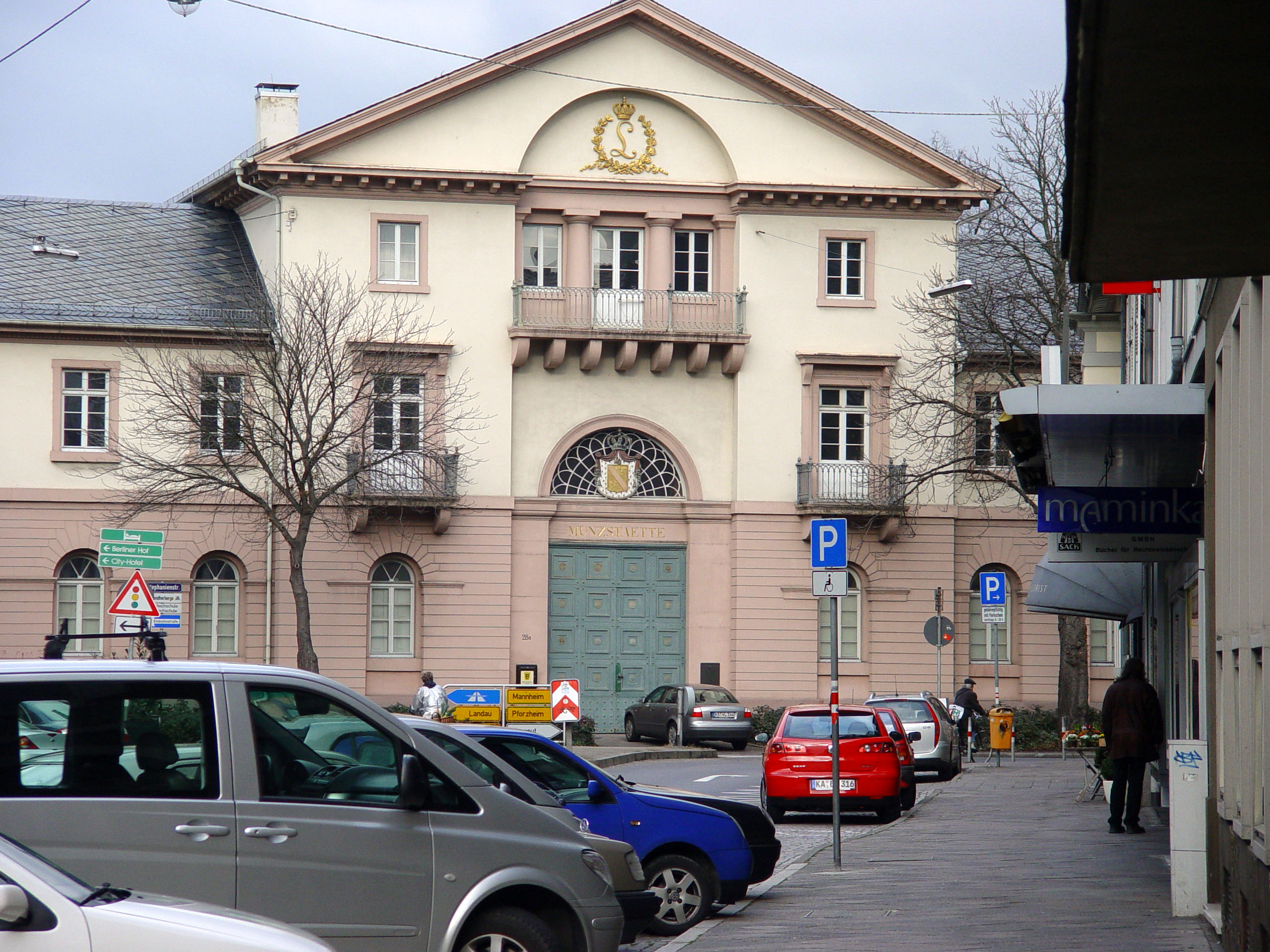
Karlsruhe Mint, built 1826–27

Upon returning from Italy, Weinbrenner worked briefly in Strasbourg and Hanover, but established himself in Karlsruhe, where he would make his career as the official architect, working for both government and private clients. Karlsruhe was established in 1715 to replace a former capital and become the capital of the newly created Grand Duchy of Baden – now a central German state but then a sovereign principality. A generation of architects were trained under his supervision, and in 1825 he helped establish the Polytechnic School in Karlsruhe. With the architects he trained and the publication of his work, a "Weinbrenner style" of Classicism developed. Weinbrenner is, of course, the architect principally responsible for creating Karlsruhe as a Classical city and, beginning with his 1797 General Plan, for the development of the city plan with an official Protestant church (Stadtkirche) (1807–15), City Hall (1821–25) on the Triumphal Road leading to the Princely palace. Most of Weinbrenner's buildings were reconstructed in the 1950s following their destruction in the Second World War.

== Buildings in Karlsruhe ==
- Karlsruhe Synagogue (1798–1800, burned 1871)
- Palace (1803–14, partial reconstruction 1960–63)
- Karlsruhe court theater (1804–08, burnt 1847)
- Library (1805, destroyed in World War II)
- City Hall (1805/06 and 1821/25, extensive reconstruction of the facade, interior greatly changed)
- Protestant Church (Stadtkirche), (1807–16, reconstruction after the war with a contemporary interior)
- St Stephan Catholic Church (1808–14, reconstruction without reconstruction of the interior 1951–55)
- Southern city gate, demolished at the end of the 19th century
- Stephanienbad at Karlsruhe-Beiertheim (1811, now used as a church)
- Museum (1813–14, burnt 1918)
- Western city gate (1817–21, partially destroyed in World War II, later demolished)
- Ständehaus (1820–22, destroyed 1944)
- Mint (1826–27)
