= 1885 in architecture =

The year 1885 in architecture involved some significant architectural events and new buildings.

== Events ==
- May – The original wooden structures of Hobson Block, West Union, Iowa, USA, are destroyed by fire, leading to construction of the present building.
- W. D. Caröe is appointed architect to the Ecclesiastical Commissioners for England.
- Construction of the Altare della Patria (Monumento Nazionale a Vittorio Emanuele II) in Rome, designed by Giuseppe Sacconi, begins; it will not be completed until 1925.

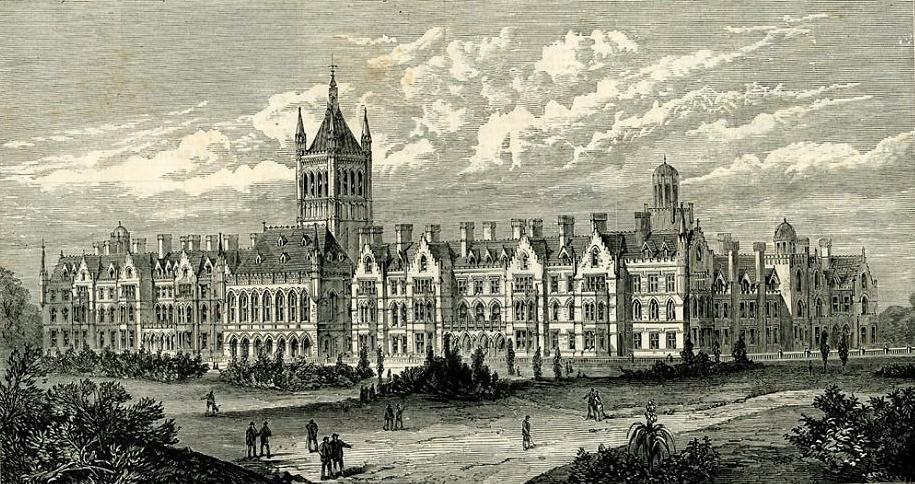
Holloway Sanatorium

== Buildings and structures ==
=== Buildings opened ===
- July 13 – New building for the Rijksmuseum in Amsterdam, designed by Pierre Cuypers.
- November 30 – London Pavilion variety theatre, designed by Robert Worley and James Ebenezer Saunders.
- December 27 – Church of St. Peter, Leipzig, designed by August Hartel and Constantin Lipsius.
- Castle Hotel, Conwy, Wales.
- Church of Saint Anthony of Padua, Busovača, Bosnia-Herzegovina.
- Vestermarie Church, Bornholm, Denmark.
- Metropole Hotel, London, designed by Francis Fowler and James Ebenezer Saunders.

=== Buildings completed ===
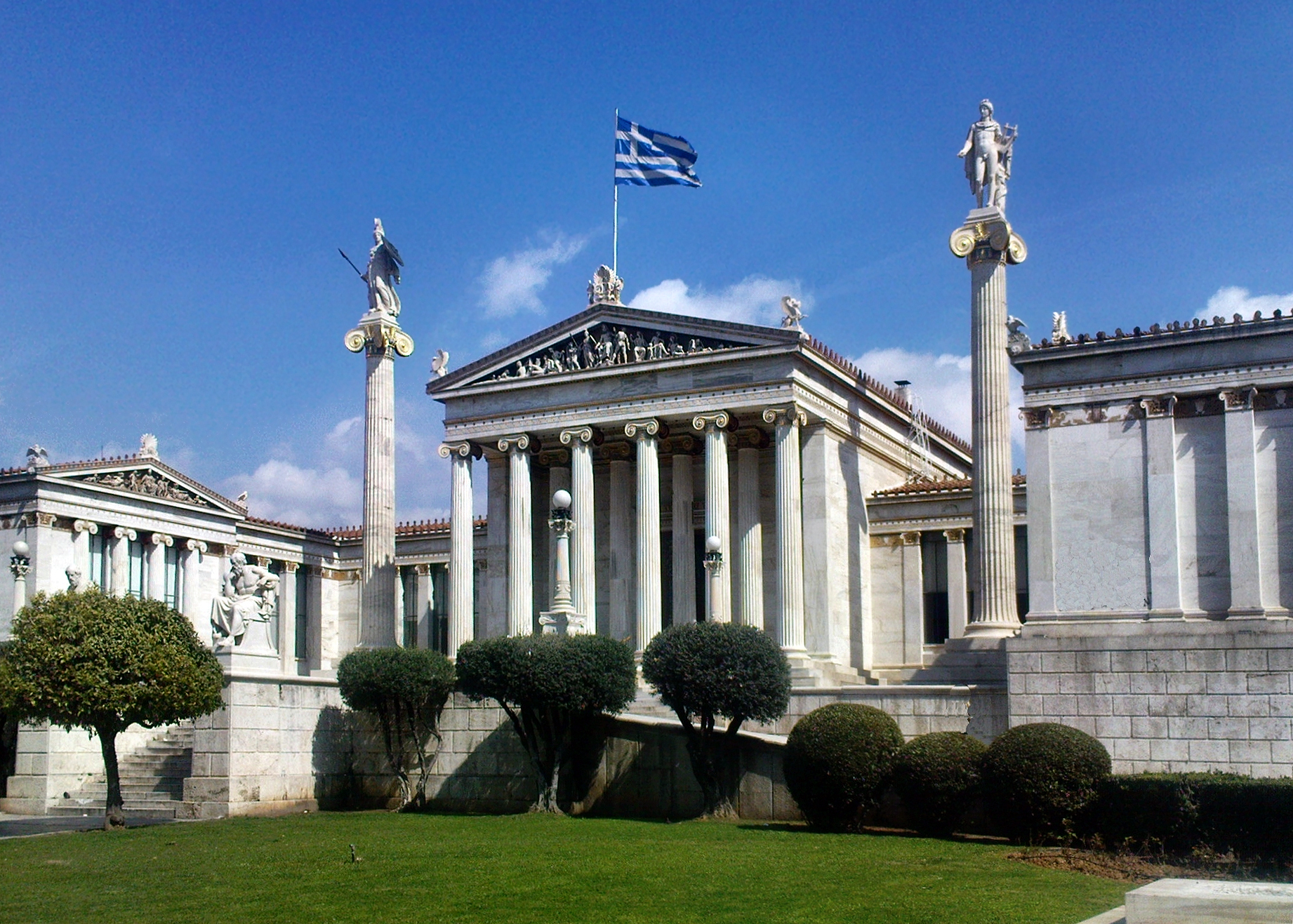
The Academy of Athens, Greece

- Autumn – The Home Insurance Building in Chicago, Illinois, designed by William Le Baron Jenney. With ten floors and a fireproof weight-bearing metal frame, it is regarded as the first skyscraper.
- Academy of Athens (Greece), designed by Theophil Hansen in 1859.
- Holloway Sanatorium near Virginia Water in England, designed by William Henry Crossland.
- Sway Tower in Hampshire, England, designed by Andrew Peterson using concrete made with Portland cement. It remains the world's tallest non-reinforced concrete structure.
- House for Kate Greenaway, Frognal, London, designed by Richard Norman Shaw.
- Elmside (house), Grange Road, Cambridge, England, designed by Edward Prior.
- Rebuilt Framingham Railroad Station in Framingham, Massachusetts, designed by H. H. Richardson.

== Awards ==
- RIBA Royal Gold Medal – Heinrich Schliemann.
- Grand Prix de Rome, architecture: François Paul André.

== Births ==
- February 23 – Yoshikazu Uchida, Japanese architect and structural engineer (died 1972)
- July 13 – Adolf Behne, German art historian, architectural writer and leader of the Avant Garde movement (died 1948)
- July 15 – Josef Frank, Austrian-born architect and designer (died 1967)
- July 29 – Sigurd Lewerentz, Swedish architect and furniture designer (died 1975)
- August 13 – Charles Howard Crane, American architect (died 1952)
- August 30 – Paul Gösch, German Expressionist artist, architect, lithographer and designer (died 1940)
- September 22 – Gunnar Asplund, Swedish "Nordic Classicist" architect (died 1940)
- December 5 – Ernest Cormier, Canadian engineer and architect (died 1980)
- December 17 – Wells Coates, Canadian architect, designer and writer (died 1958)
- December 28 – Vladimir Tatlin, Russian painter and architect (died 1953)

== Deaths ==
- February 1 – Henri Dupuy de Lôme, French naval architect (born 1816)
- March 9 – Matthew Ellison Hadfield, English Victorian Gothic architect (born 1812)
- May 22 – Théodore Ballu, French architect of public buildings (born 1817)
- May 28 – Horace King, US architect, engineer, and bridge builder.
- June 14 – William Tinsley, US-based Irish architect (born 1804)
- August 1 – Thomas Leverton Donaldson, British architect, co-founder and President of the Royal Institute of British Architects
- August 24 – Eduard Riedel, German architect and Bavarian government building officer (born 1813)
- September 2 – Giuseppe Bonavia, Maltese architect (born 1821)
- November 16 – Frederick Ernst Ruffini, US architect (born 1851)
