= Bernard Zehrfuss =

French architect

Center of New Industries and Technologies, 1958

Bernard Louis Zehrfuss (20 October 1911 – 3 July 1996) was a French architect.

== Life ==
He was born at Angers, into a family that had fled from the Alsace in 1870 after the Franco-Prussian War.

Zehrfuss's father was killed in the First Battle of the Marne in 1914. He attended the École des Beaux-Arts in Paris from the age of 18 and won its most prestigious award, the Prix de Rome in 1939 (also the year of his first major design, for the Sébastien Charléty Stadium in Paris), though the outbreak of the Second World War prevented him from taking up his stay at the Villa Medici in Rome. After a short stay in Nice, he became an assistant in Eugene Beaudouin's Marseille workshop, then founded the Groupe d’Oppède, a short-lived artistic commune in nearby Oppède, a commune that attracted French sculptor François Stahly and the writer and artist Consuelo de Saint-Exupéry. Zehrfuss then obtained a visa for Spain and joined the Free French Forces.

In French-controlled Algeria and Tunisia from 1943 through 1953, Zehrfuss was appointed to office in the Directorate of Public Works and built many well-received housing projects, schools and hospitals.

On return to France he was made Chief Architect of Public Buildings and National Palaces and participated in two high-profile projects: the 1953 European headquarters of UNESCO, a collaboration with Marcel Breuer and Pier Luigi Nervi, and the 1958 Center of New Industries and Technologies, one of the first buildings of La Défense. These stand among many French housing projects and embassies through the 1960s and 1970s.

In 1975 he designed the new building for the Gallo-Roman Museum of Lyon. In 1983, Zehrfuss was elected a member of the Academy of Fine Arts, where he became the perpetual secretary in 1994, succeeding Marcel Landowski.

He died at Neuilly-sur-Seine in 1996.

== Main works ==
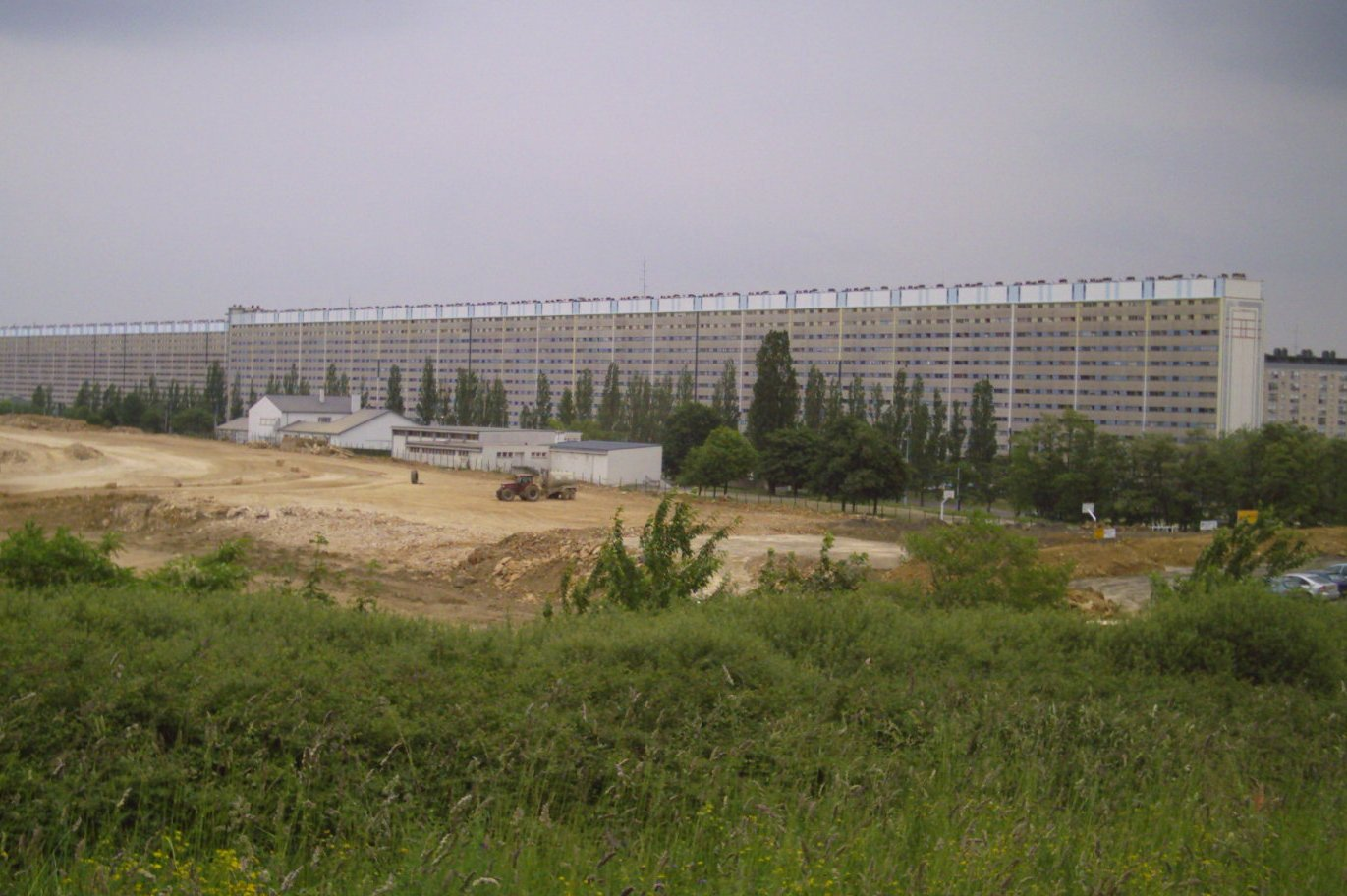
Le Haut-du-Lièvre at Nancy

- 1939: Stade Charléty in Paris (rebuilt in 1994 by Henri and Bruno Gaudin)
- 1950–1953: Mame printworks in Tours in collaboration with Jean Prouvé
- 1950–1958: Flins Renault Factory and the "cité Flins" nearby
- 1952–1958: UNESCO Headquarters in Paris in association with Marcel Breuer and Pier Luigi Nervi, then its extension (1965–1978)
- 1954–1958: the CNIT at la Défense in association with Robert Camelot and Jean de Mailly
- 1959–1963: Haut-du-Lièvre overlooking Nancy
- 1960: Clichy-sous-Bois–Montfermeil
- 1960–1963: Faculty of Sciences of the University of Tunis
- 1962–1967: flats (5 towers with 15 floors – 370 housing units) 120-126 avenue Jean-Jaurès in Pantin
- 1962–1970: French embassy in Warsaw in collaboration with Henry Bernard and Guillaume Gillet (fully renovated by Jean-Philippe Pargade in 2004)
- 1967: Garonor in Aulnay-sous-Bois
- 1968: Sandoz-France's HQ at Rueil-Malmaison
- 1970: Danish Embassy in Paris
- 1972: Siemens-France's HQ in Plaine-Saint-Denis
- 1972–1975: Gallo-Roman Museum of Lyon
- 1973: Tour Anjou at la Défense, commune of Puteaux
- 1976: Jeumont-Schneider's HQ in Puteaux
- 1976: flats on the "Procession" and "Falguière" islets in the 15th arrondissement of Paris (12000 and 387 housing units)

== Bibliography ==
- Bernard Zehrfuss, De l'architecture, Des villes, Institut de France, 1994–1995
- François Chaslin, "Bernard Zehrfuss", Dictionnaire des architectes, éd. Encyclopaedia Universalis – Albin Michel, 1999, pp. 742–744
- Christine Desmoulins, Bernard Zehrfuss (1911–1996): itinéraire d'un architecte, mémoire de DEA d'histoire socio-culturelle, ed. François Loyer, Université de Versailles-Saint-Quentin-en-Yvelines, 2001
- Christine Desmoulins : Bernard Zehrfuss, un architecture français (1911–1996). Une figure des Trente Glorieuses, doctoral thesis, ed. François Loyer, Spécialité : Histoire de l'Architecture, Laboratoire : LADRHAUS, École Nationale Supérieure d'Architecture de Versailles, 2008.
