= 1940 in architecture =

The year 1940 in architecture involved some significant architectural events and new buildings.

== Events ==
- Oscar Niemeyer begins to design landmark public buildings around the artificial lake of Pampulha in Belo Horizonte, state of Minas Gerais in southeastern Brazil.
- The last of the White Pine Series of Architectural Monographs, begun in 1916, is published.
- Thomas Sharp's Pelican book Town Planning is published in the United Kingdom.
- November 9 – Major fire at Castle Howard in England.

== Buildings and structures ==
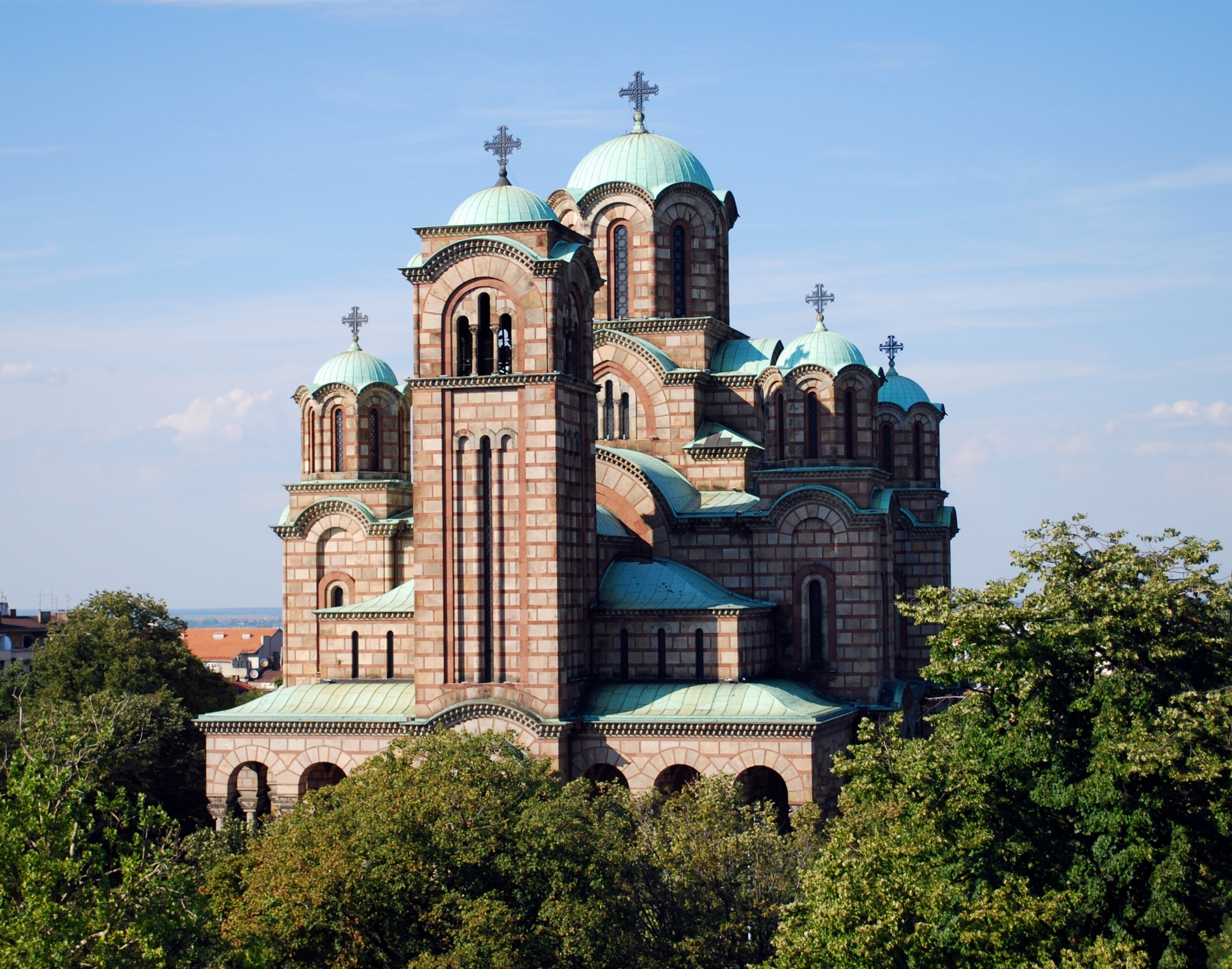
St. Mark's Church, Belgrade, Serbia

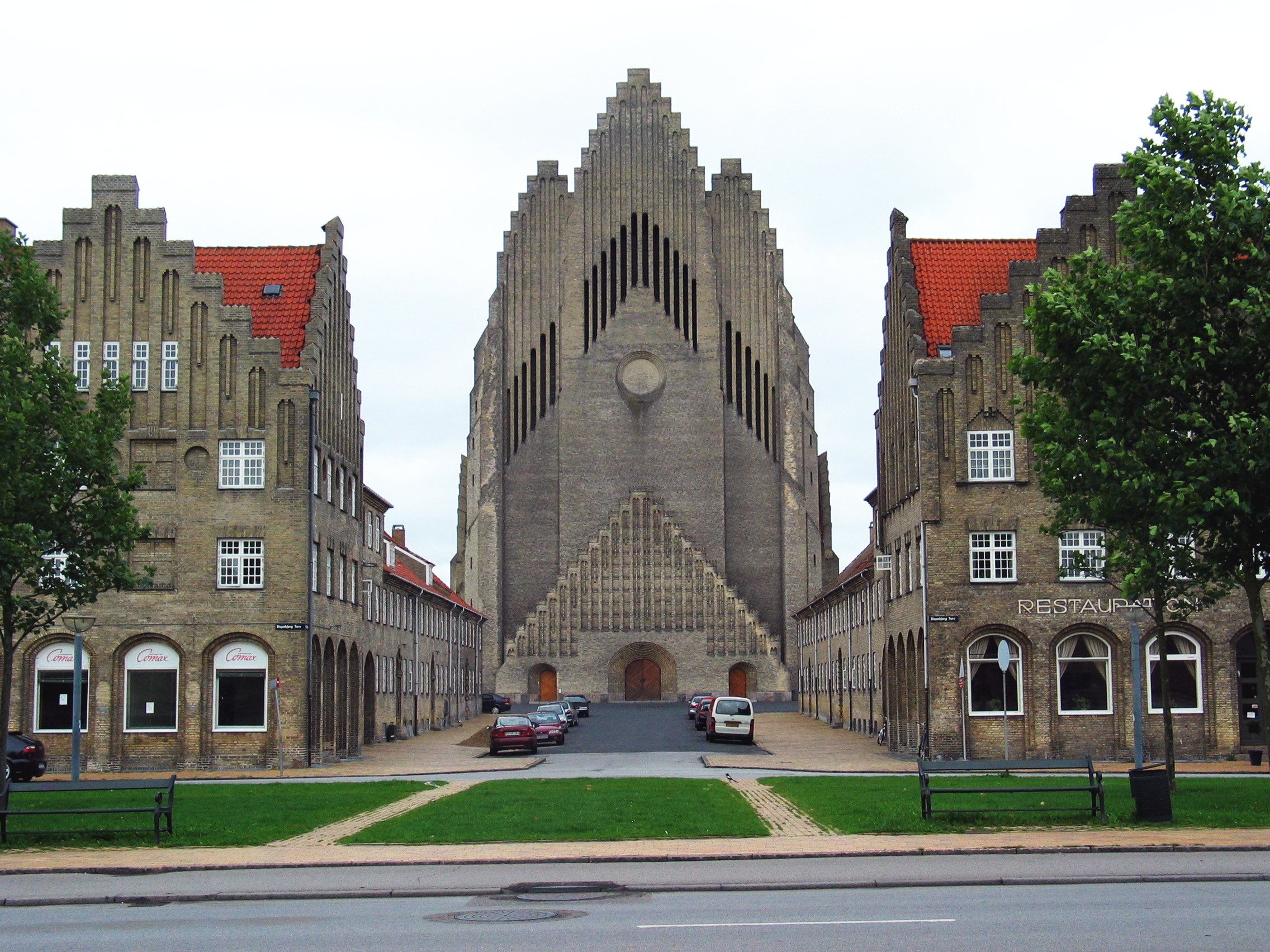
Grundtvig's Church in Copenhagen, Denmark

=== Buildings completed ===
- Igreja Nossa Senhora do Brasil in São Paulo, Brazil.
- St. Mark's Church, Belgrade, Serbia.
- Church of St. Michael, Črna Vas, Slovenia, designed by Jože Plečnik.
- Timișoara Orthodox Cathedral, Timișoara, Romania.
- Grundtvig's Church, Bispebjerg, Copenhagen, Denmark, designed by Peder Vilhelm Jensen-Klint (d.1930) in 1913 and completed by his son Kaare Klint.
- Church of the Divine Unity, Newcastle upon Tyne, England, designed by Cackett, Burns Dick and Mackellar.
- Church and Priory of Christ the King, Cockfosters, London, designed by Dom Constantine Bosschaerts.
- Raleigh Hotel in Miami Beach, Florida, United States, designed by Lawrence Murray Dixon.
- Replacement Llao Llao Hotel at San Carlos de Bariloche, Argentina, designed by Alejandro Bustillo.
- Civic Centre of San Carlos de Bariloche, Argentina, designed by Ernesto de Estrada.
- New Bodleian Library in the University of Oxford, England, designed by Sir Giles Gilbert Scott.
- Atatürk Bridge, Istanbul, Turkey (the fourth bridge on this site).
- Eastern Michigan Motorbus Terminal in Ann Arbor, United States, designed by Banfield and Cumming with Douglas Loree.
- Detroit Arsenal (Warren, Michigan) Tank Plant, designed by Albert Kahn.
- Walton Yacht Works at Walton on Thames, England, designed by Jane Drew.
- No. 4 Boathouse at HMNB Portsmouth, England, designed by E. A. Scott.

== Awards ==
- American Academy of Arts and Letters Gold Medal – William Adams Delano.
- RIBA Royal Gold Medal – Charles Voysey.

== Births ==
- January 14 – Helmut Jahn, German-American architect
- March 26 – Jörg Streli, Austrian architect and academic (died 2019)
- May 31 – Lebbeus Woods, American architect and artist (died 2012)
- June 24 – Claude Vasconi, French architect (died 2009)
- September 3 – Frank Duffy, British architect

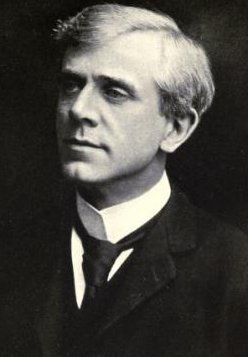
John A. Pearson

== Deaths ==
- February 27 – Peter Behrens, German architect and designer (born 1868)
- March 24 – Thomas Adams, British urban planner (born 1871)
- June 11
  - Alfred S. Alschuler, Chicago architect (born 1876)
  - John A. Pearson, Canadian architect (born 1867)
- August 22 – Paul Gösch, German artist, architect, lithographer and designer (born 1885)
- October 20 – Gunnar Asplund, Swedish Nordic Classicist architect (born 1885)
- December 13 – Marc Camoletti, Swiss architect (born 1857)
