= Marc Camoletti =

Marc Camoletti may refer to:

- Marc Camoletti (playwright) (1923–2003), French playwright
- Marc Camoletti (architect) (1857–1940), Swiss architect; namesake and grandfather of the playwright
