= 1958 in architecture =

The year 1958 in architecture involved some significant architectural events and new buildings.

== Events ==
- February 21 – The Irish Georgian Society, the group for the promotion of Georgian architecture in Ireland, is established by Desmond Guinness.
- February 28 – The Victorian Society, the pressure group for the promotion and protection of Victorian and Edwardian Baroque architecture and related arts in the United Kingdom, holds its first meeting at Linley Sambourne House in London.
- Alvar Aalto is commissioned to design the North Jutland Art Museum in Aalborg, Denmark (completed 1972).
- Sanctuary of Divine Mercy (Sanktuarium Miłosierdzia Bożego), Kalisz, Poland is designed; it will not be built until 1977–93.
- Competition for the design of Churchill College, Cambridge, England, is won by Richard Sheppard's practice, Sheppard Robson; the competition also launches the practice of Howell, Killick, Partridge and Amis.

== Buildings and structures ==
=== Buildings opened ===
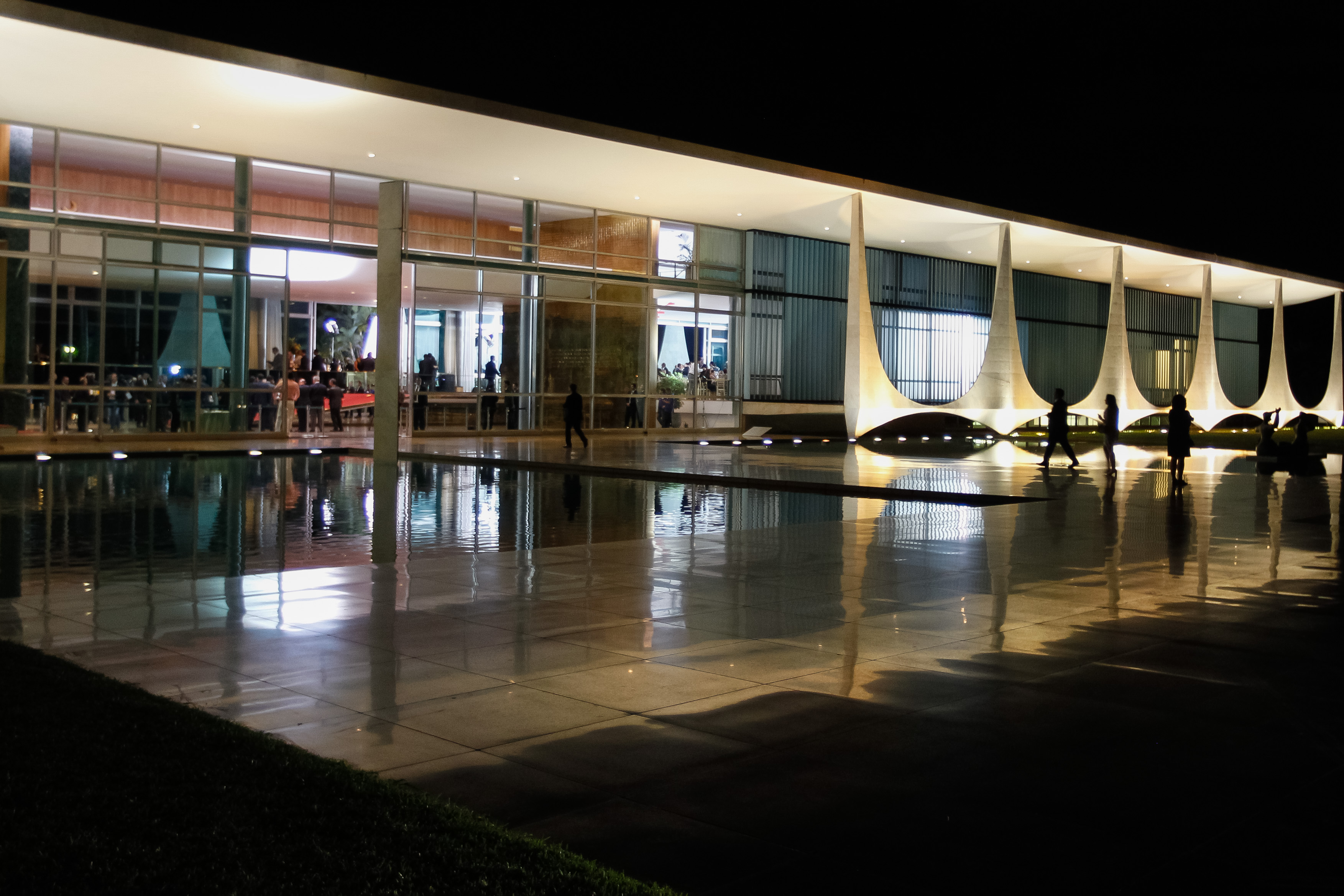
Palácio da Alvorada in Brasília, Brazil

- March 27 – Congress House, London, designed by David Aberdeen, officially opened.
- April 17 – Opening of the Expo '58 World's Fair in Brussels; its most notable features are the Atomium, designed by André Waterkeyn, and the Philips Pavilion, designed by Iannis Xenakis.
- June 30 – Palácio da Alvorada (English: Palace of Dawn), Brasília, designed by Oscar Niemeyer.
- September 12 – Center of New Industries and Technologies, at La Défense in Paris, designed by Bernard Zehrfuss with Robert Camelot, Jean de Mailly and engineer Jean Prouvé; opened by General Charles de Gaulle.
- November 7 – Chapel, Convent of the Sisters of Mary Reparatrix, Chelsea, London, designed by Hector Corfiato, consecrated.

=== Buildings completed ===
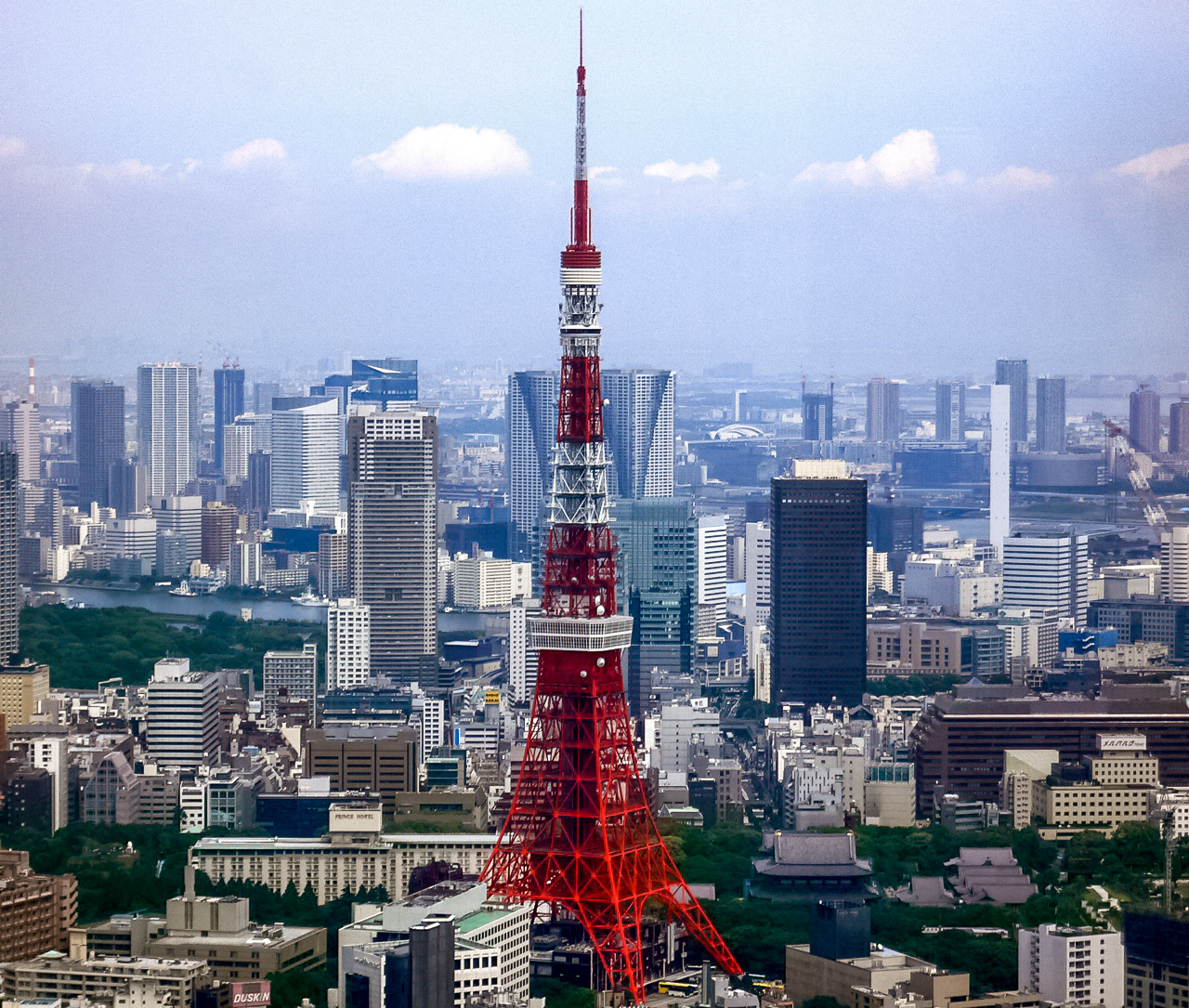
Tokyo Tower, Tokyo, Japan

- October 14 – Tokyo Tower, Shiba Park, Tokyo, Japan, by Tachū Naitō.
- October 15 – Dirksen Senate Office Building, Washington, D.C., designed by Eggers & Higgins from New York.
- Kulttuuritalo (House of Culture), Helsinki, designed by Alvar Aalto.
- The Old Vic Theatre Annex, Southwark, London, designed by Lyons, Israel and Ellis.
- UNESCO headquarters in Paris, designed by Bernard Zehrfuss with Marcel Breuer and Pier Luigi Nervi.
- Provost's House, The Queen's College, Oxford, England, designed by Raymond Erith.
- Riverview High School (Sarasota, Florida), designed by Paul Rudolph.
- St. Joseph's Church, Le Havre, France, designed by Auguste Perret (died 1954).
- Wiener Stadthalle indoor arena, Vienna, designed by Roland Rainer.
- Seagram Building in New York City, designed by Ludwig Mies van der Rohe.
- Torre Velasca in Milan, designed by BBPR.
- Torres de Satélite monument in Ciudad Satélite, Mexico, designed by Luis Barragán, Mathias Goeritz and Jesús Reyes Ferreira.
- High Sunderland (house for Bernat Klein), near Selkirk, Scottish Borders, designed by Peter Womersley.

== Awards ==
- American Academy of Arts and Letters Gold Medal – Henry R. Shepley.
- AIA Gold Medal – John Wellborn Root.
- RIBA Royal Gold Medal – Robert Schofield Morris.

== Births ==
- June 12 – Nille Juul-Sørensen, Danish architect, director of the Danish Design Centre in Copenhagen
- Wael Samhouri, Syrian-Palestinian architect and professor

== Deaths ==
- January 8 – Mary Colter, American architect and designer (born 1869)
- May 17 – Hugo Häring, German architect and writer (born 1882)
- June 17 – Wells Coates, Canadian architect, designer and writer (born 1895)
- October 19 – Gyula Rimanóczy, Hungarian architect (born 1903)
- October 25 – James Chapman-Taylor, New Zealand domestic architect (born 1878)
