= 1953 in architecture =

List of years in architecture	(table)
- … 1943; 1944; 1945; 1946; 1947; 1948; 1949; 1950; 1951; 1952; 1953; 1954; 1955; 1956; 1957; 1958; 1959; 1960; 1961; 1962; 1963 …
- Buildings and structures: Art; Archaeology; Architecture; Literature; Music; Philosophy; Science; +...

The year 1953 in architecture involved some significant events.

== Events ==
- Gordon Ryder and Peter Yates form an architectural practice based in Newcastle upon Tyne in the north of England.

== Buildings and structures completed ==
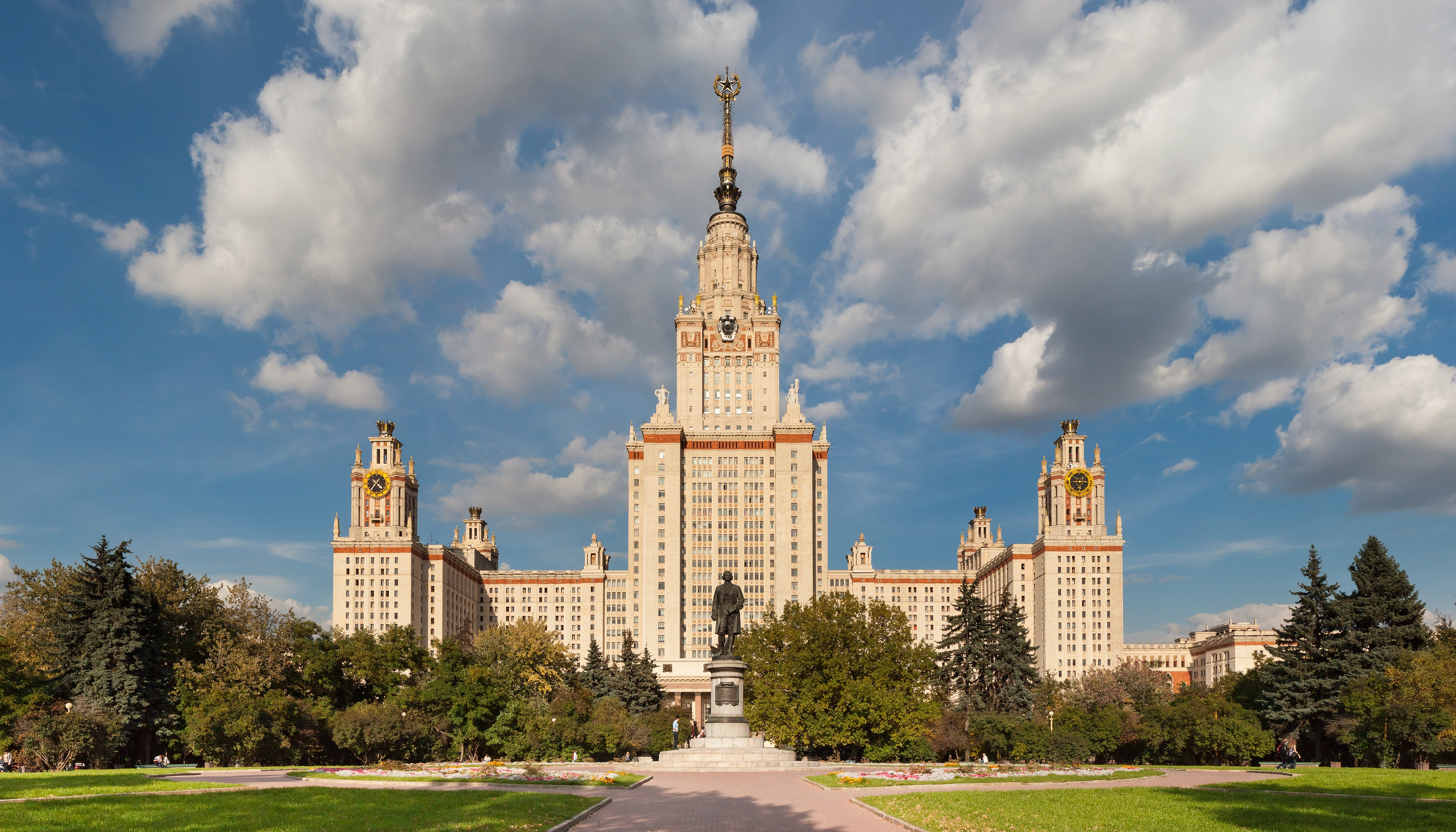
Main building of Moscow State University

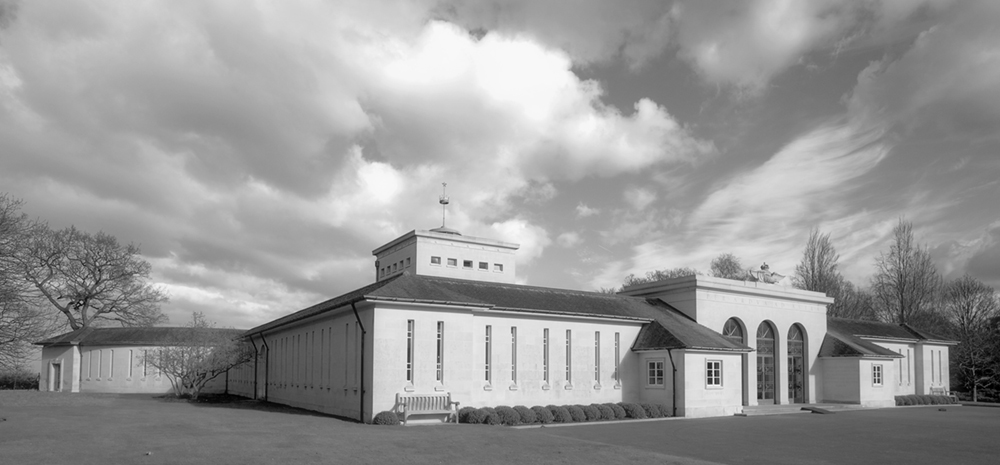
Air Forces Memorial, Runnymede

- Main building of Moscow State University, the tallest building in Europe (1953–1990) and the tallest educational building in the world (1953–present), designed by Lev Rudnev.
- St Crispin's School, Wokingham, Berkshire, England, designed by the U.K. Ministry of Education.
- YMCA Indian Student Hostel, Fitzrovia, London, designed by Ralph Tubbs.
- Housing at Chandigarh, Punjab (India), designed by Le Corbusier in collaboration with Pierre Jeanneret, Jane Drew, Maxwell Fry, B. V. Doshi and others.
- Mardyke Road (residential crescent), Harlow New Town, England, designed by Frederick Gibberd.
- Air Forces Memorial, Runnymede, England, designed by Edward Maufe, dedicated October 17.
- English Martyrs' Church, Wallasey, designed by F. X. Velarde, dedicated August 31.
- New building for Yale University Art Gallery, New Haven, Connecticut, the first major commission for Louis Kahn, opened November.
- Lijnbaan pedestrianised shopping street in Rotterdam, designed by Jo van den Broek and Jacob B. Bakema.

== Awards ==
- American Academy of Arts and Letters Gold Medal – Frank Lloyd Wright.
- AIA Gold Medal – William Adams Delano.
- RIBA Royal Gold Medal – Le Corbusier.
- Grand Prix de Rome, architecture – Olivier-Clément Cacoub.

== Publications ==
- Ivan Chtcheglov (as Gilles Ivain) – Formulaire pour un urbanisme nouveau.
- John Summerson – Architecture in Britain, 1530–1830.

== Births ==
- March 26 - Phil Freelon, American architect (Died. 2019)
- November 7 – Peter Janesch, Hungarian architect
- December 18 – David Chipperfield, English architect
- Sheila O'Donnell, Irish architect
- Richard Weston, English architect

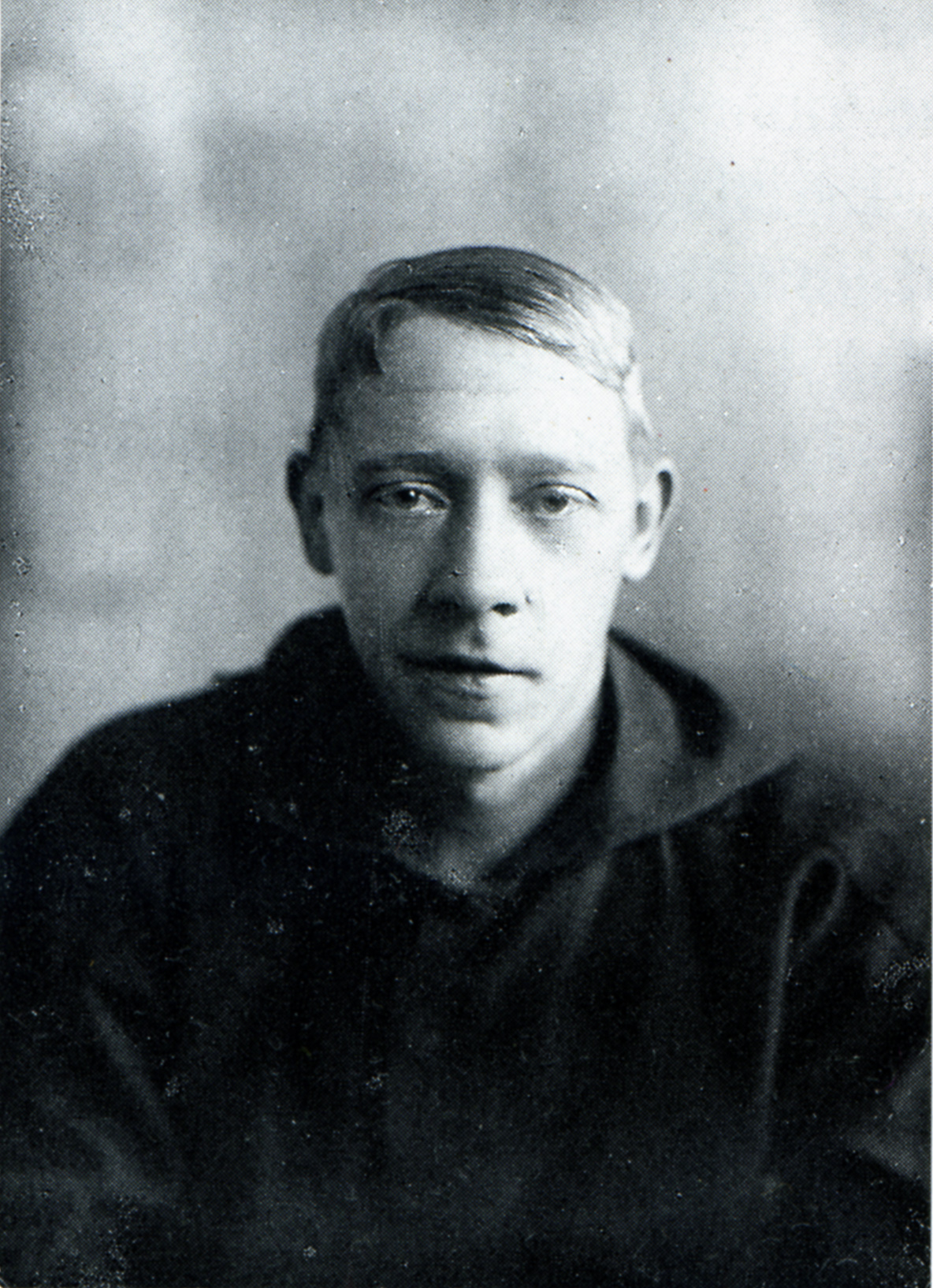
Vladimir Tatlin

== Deaths ==
- May 31 – Vladimir Tatlin, Soviet Russian architect (born 1885)
- August 17 – Sir Banister Fletcher, English architectural historian (born 1866)
- September 15 – Erich Mendelsohn, German-born architect (born 1887)
- December 13 – Ad van der Steur, Dutch architect (born 1893)
