= 1866 in architecture =

The year 1866 in architecture involved some significant events.

== Buildings and structures ==
=== Buildings ===
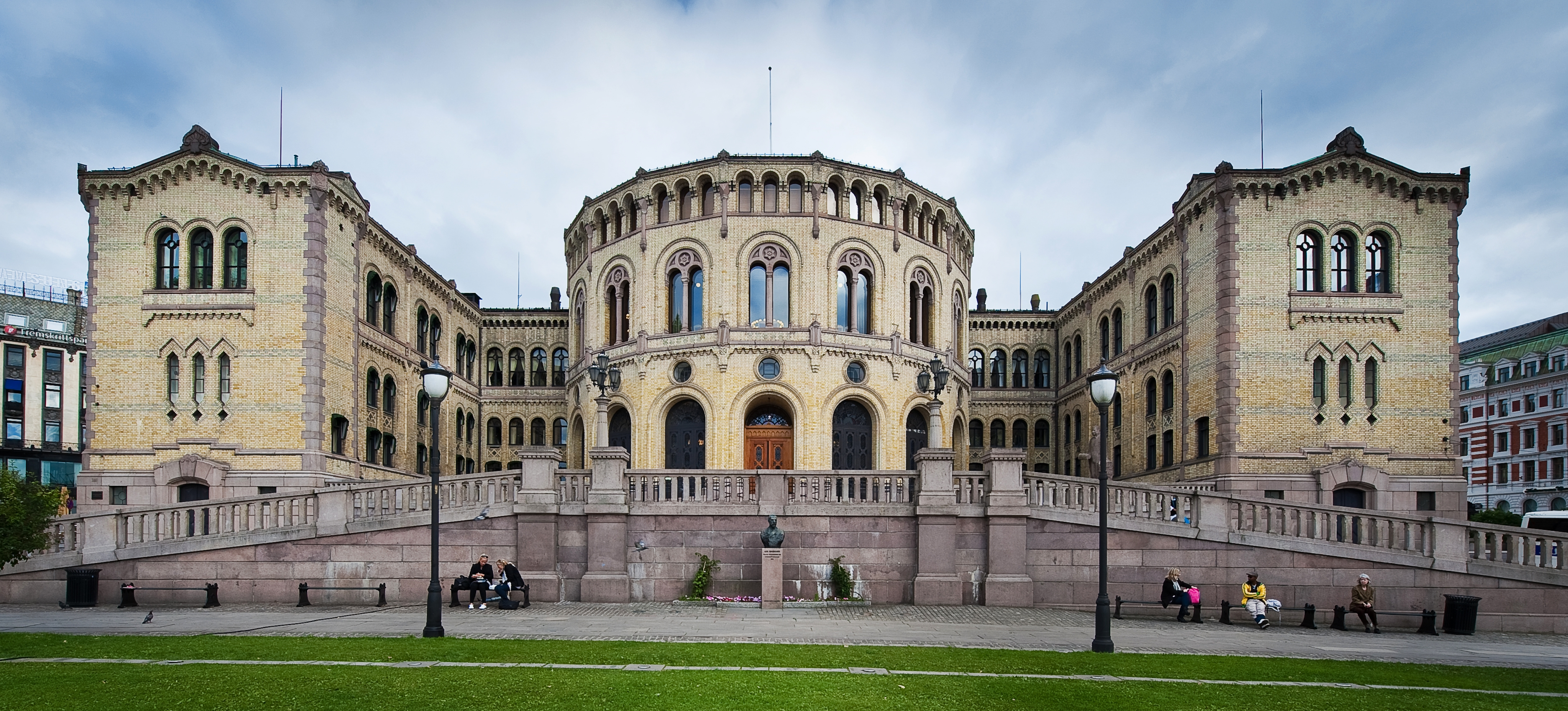
Storting building, the seat of the Norwegian Parliament, constructed between 1860 and 1866

- The seat of the Norwegian Parliament, Storting building, designed by Emil Victor Langlet, inaugurated 5 March
- The building of Nationalgalerie starts in Berlin, designed by Friedrich August Stüler and Johann Heinrich Strack.
- The New Synagogue, Berlin, Germany is completed by Friedrich August Stüler to the design of Eduard Knoblauch.
- St. Mark's Church, Royal Tunbridge Wells, England, designed by Robert Lewis Roumieu, is consecrated.
- The Princess Theatre, Melbourne, Australia by architect William Pitt is completed.
- Basilique Notre-Dame de Marienthal is completed

== Awards ==
- RIBA Royal Gold Medal – Matthew Digby Wyatt.
- Grand Prix de Rome, architecture: Jean-Louis Pascal.

== Births ==
- February 15 – Banister Fletcher, English architect and architectural historian (died 1953)
- February 23 – Joseph Miller Huston, American architect working in Pennsylvania (died 1940)
- June 14 – Henry Sproatt, Canadian architect (died 1934)
- July 14 – Ragnar Östberg, Swedish architect (died 1945)
- July 29 – Jens Zetlitz Monrad Kielland, Norwegian architect (died 1926)
- August 1 – Claude Fayette Bragdon, American architect (died 1946)
- November 28 – Henry Bacon, American Beaux-Arts architect (died 1924)

== Deaths ==
- March 23 – Ferdinand von Arnim, German architect and watercolor painter (born 1814)
