= Stade Sébastien Charléty =

Multi-purpose stadium in Paris, France

Stade Sébastien-Charléty
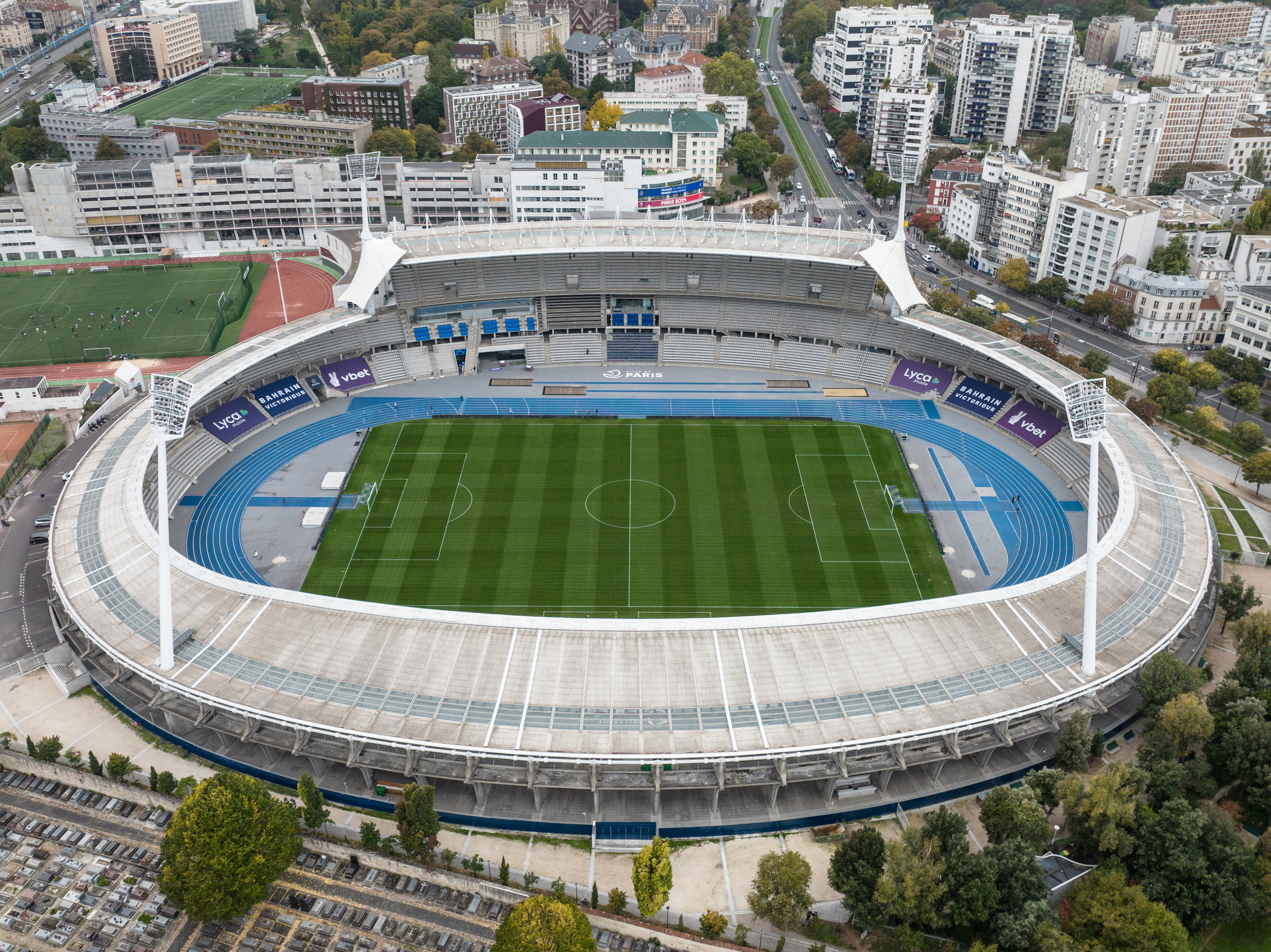
- Aerial view of the stadium, looking westward
- Interactive map of Stade Sébastien-Charléty
- Location: 99 boulevard Kellermann; 75013 Paris, Île-de-France
- Coordinates: 48°49′7″N 2°20′48″E
- Owner: Mairie de Paris
- Operator: Paris Université Club
- Capacity: 19,142
- Public transit: Stade Charléty

Construction
- Opened: 1939
- Renovated: 1994
- Architect: Bernard Zehrfuss

Tenants
- Paris Université Club (1939–present); Paris Saint-Germain Rugby League (1996–1997); Paris FC (men) (2007–2013, 2014–2025); Stade Français (2010–2013); Paris 13 Atletico (2022–present); Paris FC (women) (present)

Stade Sébastien-Charléty (French pronunciation: [stad sebastjɛ̃ ʃaʁleti]; lit. 'Stadium of Sébastien Charléty'), also known as Stade Charléty or Charléty, is a multi-purpose stadium located in the 13th arrondissement of Paris, France. Comprising a running track and a football field, the stadium is a 20,000-seat state-owned venue used for numerous sports and events. It is the current home ground of the rugby union team of Paris Université Club, who operate the venue. Football teams Paris 13 Atletico and Paris FC (women) also play at the stadium. It is also home to the House of French Sport, with the offices of the French National Olympic and Sports Committee and the French Athletics Federation.

== History ==
The stadium opened in 1938 and was designed by French architect Bernard Zehrfuss. In May 1968, Charléty made the news for a nonsporting event: on 27 May, the meeting of the Union Nationale des Étudiants de France, one of the most important of the protests of that month, took place, attracting between 30,000 and 50,000 people. The crowd, led by Pierre Mendès-France and Michel Rocard, shouted "Ce n'est qu'un début, continuons le combat!" ("This is only the beginning; let's keep up the fight!").

The stadium has hosted many matches during various Rugby League World Cups, and was the home of Paris Saint Germain Rugby League for the 1996 and 1997 seasons of Super League. The stadium has an athletic track that hosted the 1994 and 2002 IAAF Grand Prix Final and the 2003 European Youth Summer Olympic Festival. The stadium was scheduled to host the 2020 European Athletics Championships but that event was cancelled because of the COVID-19 pandemic. It served as the temporary home for the Stade Français rugby union club, starting in 2010–11 and running through 2012–13, while that club was building a completely new stadium at the site of its traditional home, Stade Jean-Bouin. It also hosted a Stade Français home match in the Paris derby with Racing Métro in the 2009–10 season.

In 2025, Paris FC left the Stade Charléty for the Stade Jean-Bouin.

== Arena ==
There is an indoor sporting arena called Salle Pierre Charpy that is located under the stadium. The capacity of the arena is 1,850 people. It is currently the home arena of the French Pro A League professional volleyball team Paris Volley.

== See also ==
- List of football stadiums in France
- Lists of stadiums

Events and tenants
Preceded by Olympiastadion; Berlin	European Athletics Championships; Main venue 2020	Succeeded by Olympiastadion; Munich
