= Ann Arbor Bus Depot =

Former bus station in Ann Arbor, Michigan

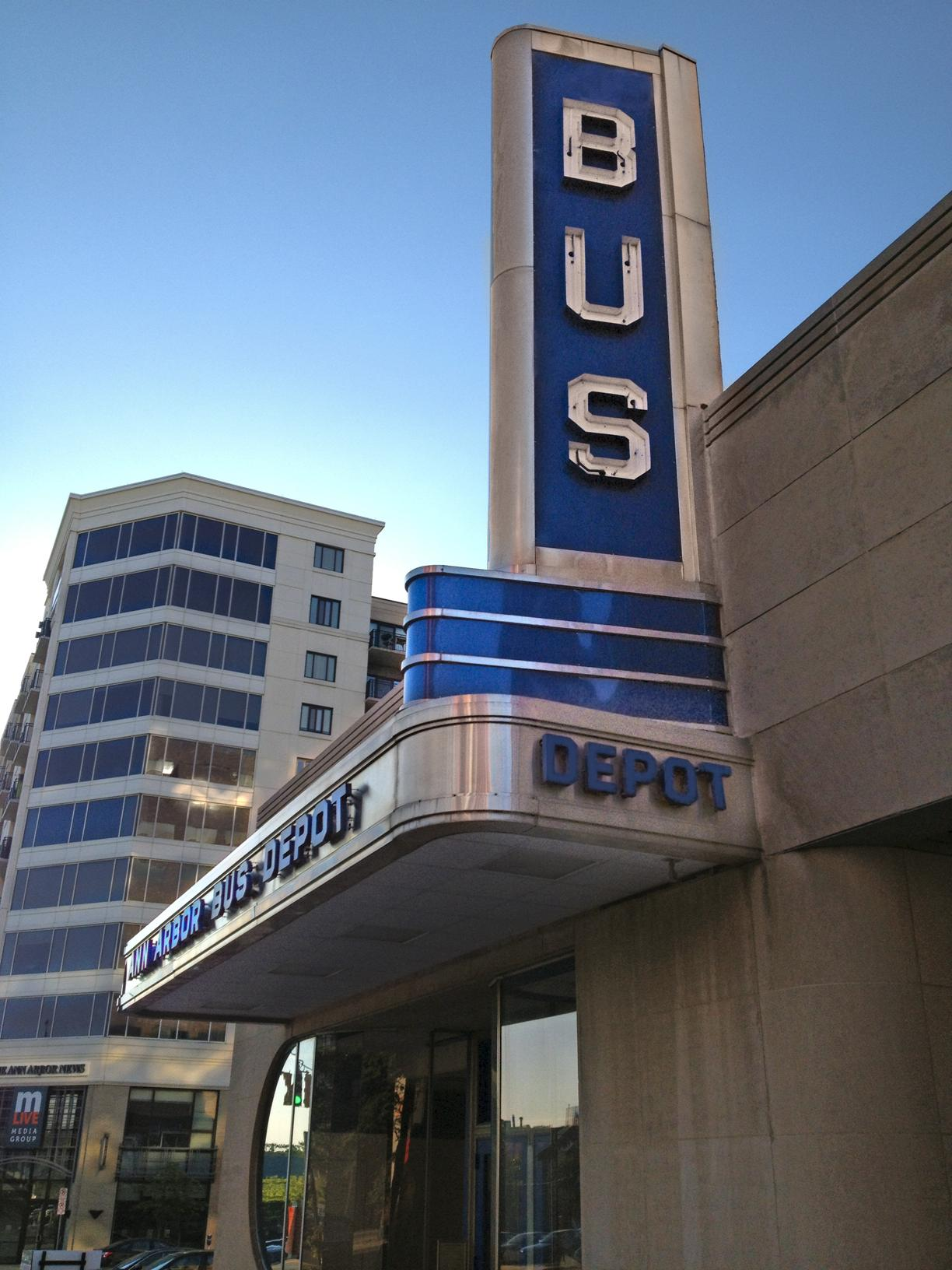
- The marquee of the Ann Arbor Bus Depot in 2014

- Location within Michigan
- Former names: Eastern Michigan Motorbus Terminal

General information
- Type: Bus station
- Architectural style: Streamline Moderne; Art Deco
- Location: 116 W. Huron, Ann Arbor, Michigan, United States
- Coordinates: 42°16′53.93″N 83°44′57.41″W
- Completed: 1940
- Inaugurated: September 5, 1940
- Demolished: July 21, 2014
- Cost: $60,000

Technical details
- Size: 182 ft (55 m) by 55 ft (17 m)

Design and construction
- Architects: Banfield and Cumming; Douglas Loree
- Awards: Individual Historic Property on the Ann Arbor Register of Historic Places (1988–2001)

The Ann Arbor Bus Depot was an intercity bus station located at 116 W. Huron in Ann Arbor, Michigan. It was built in 1940 as the Eastern Michigan Motorbus Terminal, and operated as a bus station until its demolition in 2014. It was designed by the Cleveland-based architects Banfield and Cumming, in partnership with Ann Arbor architect Douglas Loree, in an Art Deco style. Between 1988 and 2001, it was listed as an Individual Historic Property on the Ann Arbor Register of Historic Places.

The Bus Depot was demolished in 2014 to make way for a six-story, 110-room hotel on the property. Its facade and marquee were preserved and have been incorporated into the new hotel. It served as Ann Arbor's Greyhound station until shortly before its demolition in 2014. It was also both the last surviving example of Streamline Moderne architecture and the last public Art Deco structure in Ann Arbor.

== History ==
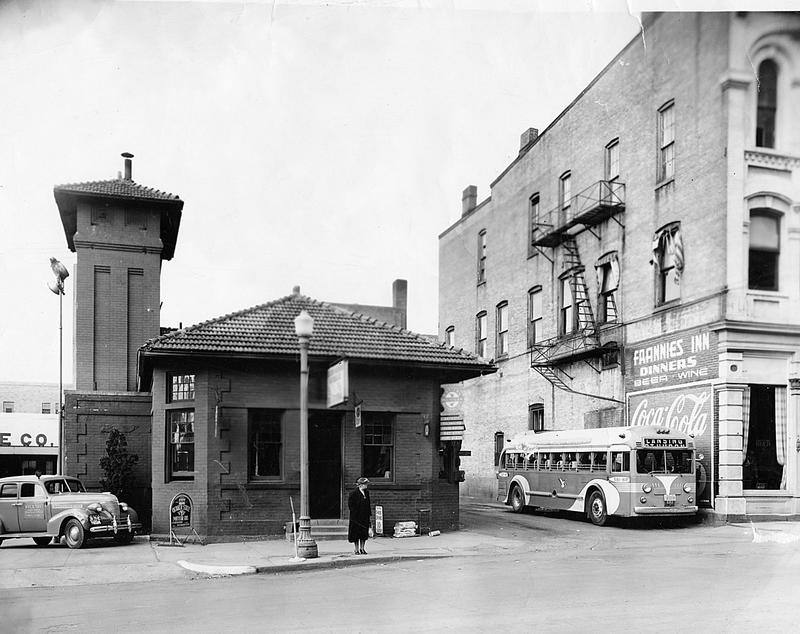
The former interurban station at 116 W. Huron, served by Greyhound buses, circa 1939

Located at 116 W. Huron, the Ann Arbor Bus Depot was designed by the Cleveland-based architects Banfield and Cumming, in partnership with local architect Douglas Loree, and was built in 1940 as the Eastern Michigan Motorbus Terminal. It cost $60,000 to build, and was at the time considered one of the most modern bus stations in the United States. It was dedicated by Ann Arbor mayor Walter C. Sadler on September 5, 1940. The building operated as a bus station from 1940 until its demolition in 2014. Originally, it was owned by the Eastern Michigan Motorbus Company, and was used by the Blue Goose, Greyhound, and Short Way bus lines. By 1952, Blue Goose service had ended and had been replaced by the Bee Line bus company.

Prior to the creation of the Bus Depot, the site was home to an Ann Arbor and Ypsilanti Street Railway depot and transformer tower that were built in 1898. The interurban system served the location until its demise in 1929, at which point it was succeeded by a replacement bus service.

== Design ==
One of a number of bus stations built in the Art Deco style during the 1930s and 1940s, the Ann Arbor Bus Depot was featured in the book Modern Bus Terminals and Post Houses. Similarly designed Banfield and Cumming bus depots were also built in Kalamazoo and Windsor during 1940. The exterior design of the Bus Depot consisted of a black granite base, Indiana limestone, and curved glass, finished with a stainless steel-trimmed, porcelain enamel marquee. According to Karen L. Brandt, the exterior design was intended to "evoke a feeling of movement and speed". The building itself was steel framed and rectangular in shape, measuring 182 ft (55 m) by 55 ft (17 m). The Bus Depot's rear and side walls were built with buff brick, and a porte-cochère served as a bus lane on the building's east side.

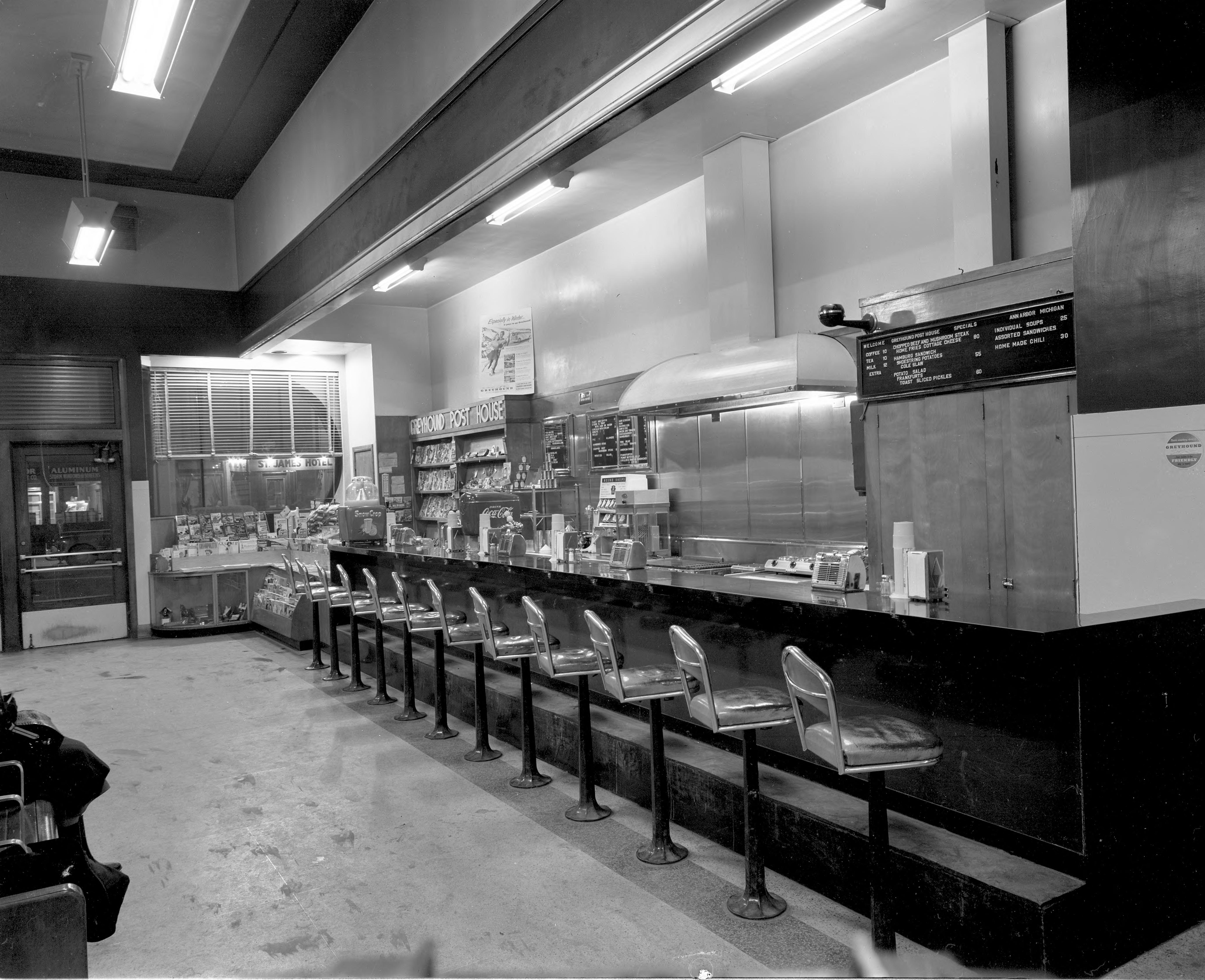
Interior of the station with the lunch counter, 1952

The original interior of the Ann Arbor Bus Depot featured birchwood cabinetry and stainless steel stairways designed to complement the sleek appearance of the exterior. As originally built, the Bus Depot's interior included a baggage room, a ticket counter, a waiting area that could accommodate 62 people, and a 300-square-foot (28 m^{2}) lunch counter that sat 14 diners. Restrooms were located on the mezzanine level. By 2005, however, the building's interior had been extensively modified, and the only original features that had survived were the ceramic tiled walls in the restrooms and banded steel rails on the stairs. The original beige and brown terrazzo floors had been covered over with beige vinyl tile.

In 2005, Brandt described the Bus Depot as being "in dire need of cleaning, repair and restoration", noting examples of chipped enamel, roof corrosion, rusted window frames, cracked windowpanes, and cracked mortar in masonry throughout the building.

== Awards and accolades ==
In 1986, the Ann Arbor Observer named the Bus Depot one of its "favorite buildings". It was added to the Ann Arbor Register of Historic Places in 1988 as an Individual Historic Property. In 2001, it lost this designation due to a Michigan Supreme Court decision that ruled that a city's historic district could only consist of contiguous properties, which resulted in numerous buildings losing their historic status.

== Redevelopment and demolition ==
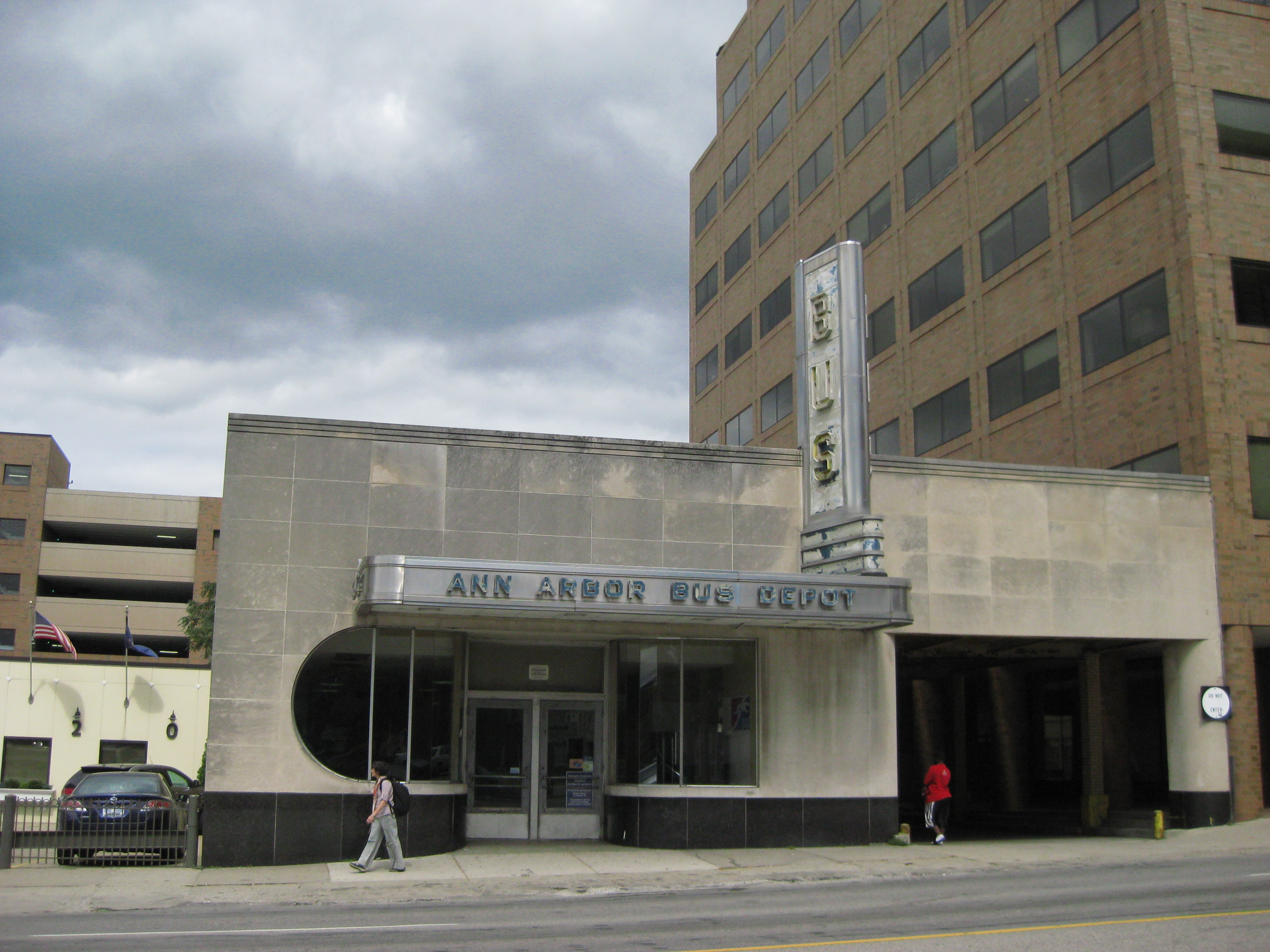
The Ann Arbor Bus Depot in 2010 (above) and 2013 (below), before and after the restoration of its marquee, respectively

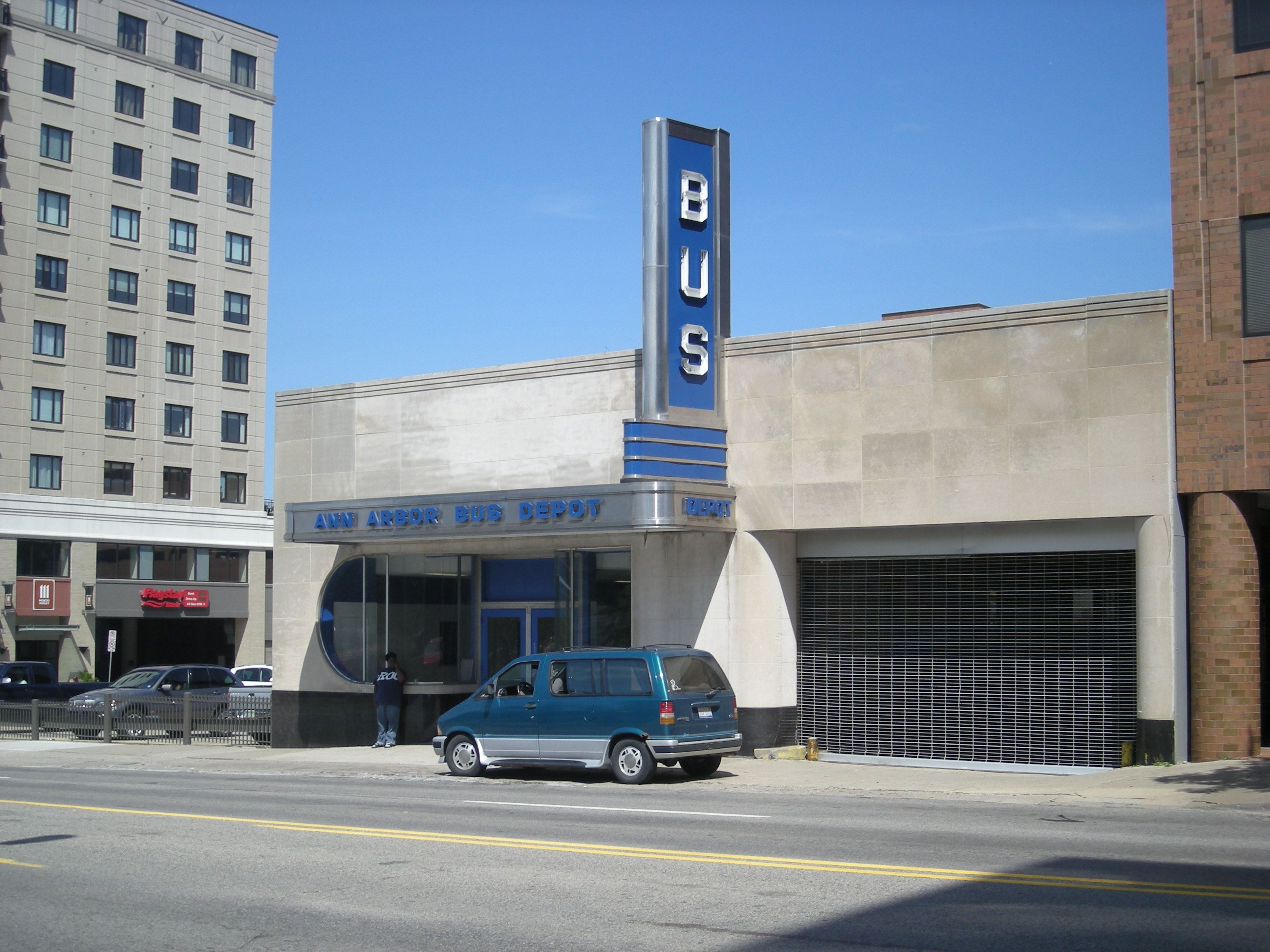

First Martin Corporation purchased the Ann Arbor Bus Depot property in 1989. Its March 1998 proposal to tear down the bus station and build a ten-story office building on the site was approved by the Ann Arbor Historic District Commission in January 1999, but in 2005 the station was still standing and the office building had not been built. In 2013, First Martin's restoration of the Bus Depot's blue neon and steel marquee won a Special Merit Award from the Historic District Commission, which is given to recognize "exceptional projects, landscapes or other unique preservation projects".

In December 2013, First Martin proposed the construction of a six-story hotel on the Ann Arbor Bus Depot property, and at the same time voiced its intention to preserve the Depot's marquee and facade and ultimately incorporate them into the proposed hotel. In June 2014, the Ann Arbor City Council voted unanimously to approve First Martin's proposed hotel, which at that point was revealed to be a 110-room, extended-stay Residence Inn by Marriott. The plan included the destruction of the Bus Depot, and a subsequent move for Greyhound services to a repurposed Republic Parking office inside a parking garage on the corner of Fourth and William.

Both the Downtown Area Citizens Advisory Council, represented by chair Ray Detter, and the majority of the Historic District Commissioners voiced their support for the project and its commitment to preserve the Bus Depot's facade and marquee. Rebecca Binno, the Preservation Committee Chair of the Detroit Area Art Deco Society, testified in opposition to the plan to preserve only the building's facade and demolish the rest of the structure. After the Ann Arbor Historic District Commission gave its approval to the First Martin plan, Binno lamented the decision as "another case of our moderne architecture being considered expendable and not appreciated as significant to the community’s history."

On June 20, 2014, the Ann Arbor Bus Depot's marquee was removed in preparation for the demolition of the building and subsequent construction of the hotel. The hotel was described by city planner Alexis DiLeo as a blend of the Bus Depot's art moderne design and "classic downtown Ann Arbor." On July 9, 2014, Greyhound left the Bus Depot and transferred its services to a temporary ticket office in a city parking garage on South Fourth Avenue, adjacent to the Ann Arbor Area Transportation Authority's Blake Transit Center. Greyhound bus service moved to the Ann Arbor Amtrak station in 2016, where it remains as of 2024.

The bus station was demolished on July 21, 2014. Construction on the Residence Inn project began shortly afterwards, and the hotel opened for business in October 2015. The facade of the bus station serves as the main entrance to The Greyline, an events venue operated by Zingerman's.

== Legacy ==
The Ann Arbor Bus Depot was both the last surviving example of Streamline Moderne architecture and the last public Art Deco structure in Ann Arbor. It was a popular photographic subject in the city, and it was also featured in numerous Ann Arbor-related promotional materials and guide books.

Two historical markers, placed in 2016 on the front wall of the former station, detail the location's history from interurban depot to bus station to hotel.

== Gallery ==
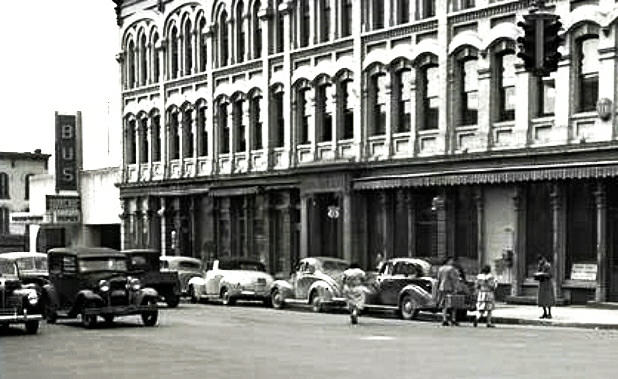
The Ann Arbor Bus Depot in 1943, to the left of the Savings Bank Building

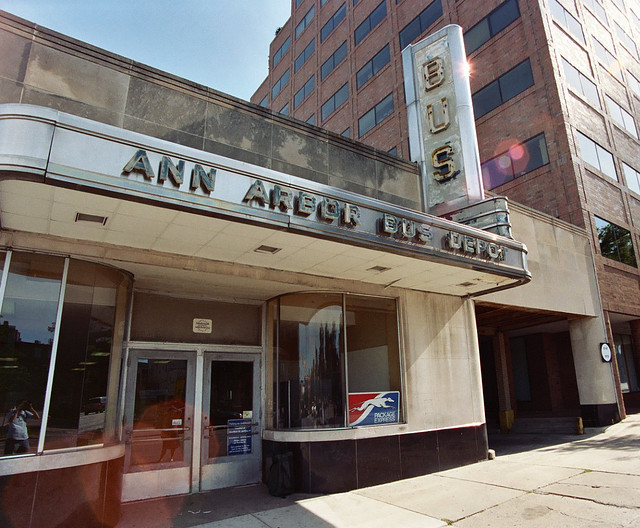
The Ann Arbor Bus Depot in 2006

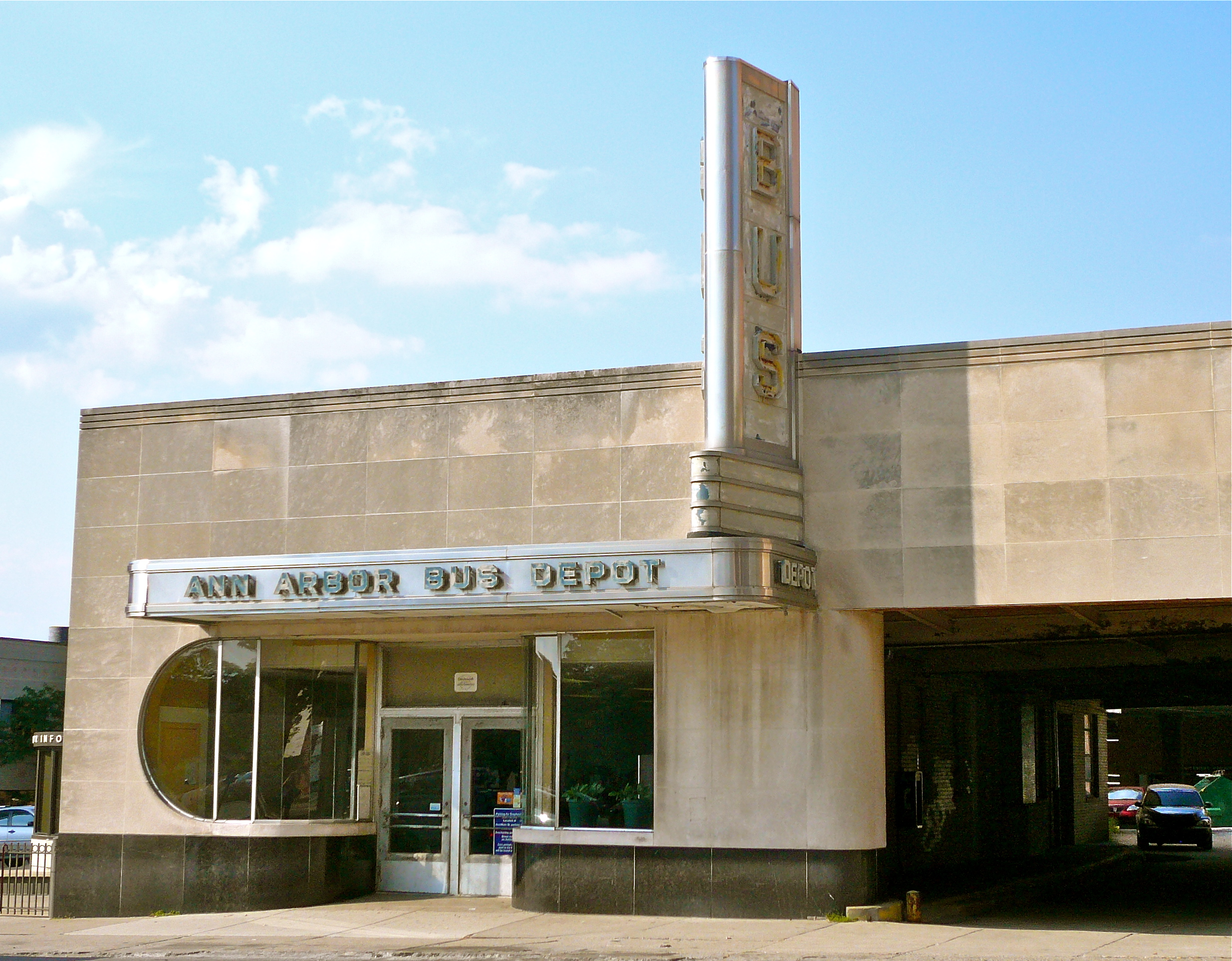
The Ann Arbor Bus Depot in 2009

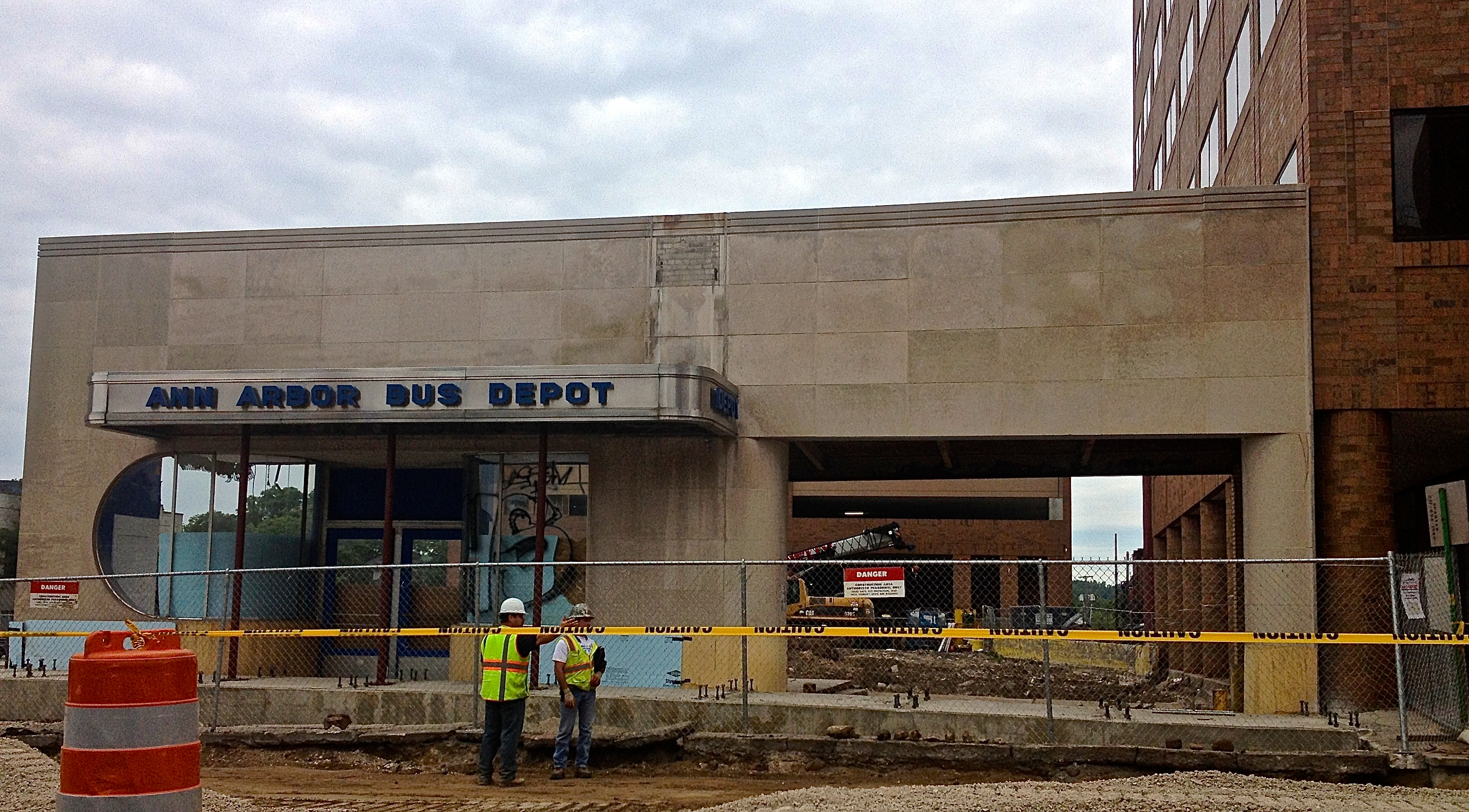
The preserved facade of the Ann Arbor Bus Depot on July 26, 2014
