= Wael Samhouri =

Syrian Architect and Urban Designer

- Born: 1958 (age 67–68); Damascus
- Education: Royal College of Arts - London
- Occupation: Architect
- Practice: Wael Samhouri Architecture & Urban Design

Wael Samhouri وائل السمهوري (born 1958 in Damascus) is a Syrian-Palestinian architect and professor of Architecture and Urban Design. He is currently the chairman of the Department of Theory & History of Architecture in Damascus University, and was previously the founding chairman of two other private architecture departments. His architectural practice (Wael Samhouri Architecture & Urban Design) (first founded in 1992) in Syria, has produced award-winning designs. His research and writing interest is currently in sacred architecture and its representation in the modern world and the philosophy of post-war reconstruction architecture.

== Early life ==
Wael Samhouri comes from a family of academics, both his mother (Quamar Al-Duaji) and his father were university professors. His father (M. Zouhair Samhouri) is an eminent linguist and translator who worked at the United Nations in Geneva. Wael travelled extensively with his family between Europe and the Gulf, and lived for years in England and Kuwait before settling in Syria.

== Education and career ==
Samhouri graduated from Damascus University with a Bachelor of Architecture in 1983, then continued pursuing his post graduate studies in Architecture and Urban design between New York and London. In 1987 he held an MSc in Urban Design from Pratt Institute, (Note: At Pratt Institute, he studied morphology with Haresh Lalvani and Urban Design& Morphology with Kenneth Halpern and Raymond Curran, along the theories of Colin Rowe.) New York and later in 1990, a Ph. D. in Architecture & Urban Design from the Royal College of Art in London. (Note: Samhouri met Keith Critchlow in New York and decided to move to London to study with him at the Royal College of Art.)

Later in 1992, he founded his own practice Wael Samhouri Architecture & Urban Design in Damascus, Syria. He has been a member of several committees and NGOs. From 2007 to 2010, he was a member of the Aga Khan Award for Architecture Technical Review team. He was a technical reviewer at Al-Fozan Award for modern mosque architecture. In 2008, he joined the board of trustees of the Aga Khan Development Network in Syria.

Alongside practicing Architecture, Samhouri has been a professor and chairman of the Department of Theory & History of Architecture in Damascus University since 2004. He was also the founding Chairman of the Department of Architecture in the University of Kalamoon, Syria (2004–2006), and in the International University for Science and Technology IUST, Syria (2006–2010).

Samhouri is active in the academic discourse in the region. He founded the Apollodorus of Damascus, A platform for architectural discourse, globally connecting architects, artists, musicians and intellectuals. The platform promotes intellectual discourse in Architecture, Art, Music and History in the region.

== Awards ==
Wael Samhouri won the first award in the Master Planning Category of Cityscape 2004 Architectural Review Awards - Dubai & London, for his project ‘Eastern Park of Damascus’. And again in 2005, where he received the Cityscape first award in the Islamic Architecture category for his Al Hasani Madrasa & Mosque in Old Damascus, Syria. He also received the Cityscape Special Award (Highly Commended—Master Planning) in 2010 for his latest project, Damascus University’s Faculty of Letters and Humanities new campus, which is currently under the final stages of construction.

In 2008, he won the award to design the Seera Museum & Research Centre in Kuwait with Gulf Consult.

== Works ==
Samhouri’s work could be considered to belong to a Regionalist (or rather Critical Regionalist) architecture - although he has now evolved to embrace a different approach. Designing the Hasani Religious Center in Damascus, he incorporates both traditional religious and modern office and educational space. By treating tradition as more than just an old pattern book, Samhouri’s building shows that cultural awareness in architecture can mean something deeper than decorated monoliths.

His work has been exhibited in the La Biennale di Venezia 2014, and included in the accompanying book: Architecture from the Arab World: 1914-2014 (a selection)

List of works:

- Al-Shaykh Badr Al-Din Al –Hassani Islamic Center & Mosque (Completed in 1998).
- Syrian Computer & Informatics Society Head Quarters (completed).
- Faculty of Medicine Library. (completed in 2000).
- New complex of the faculty of letters & humanities, University of Damascus.
- The Al-Seera And Al-Hadeeth Al-Shareef Centre, Kuwait, With GC Gulf Consult.

== Publications ==
Samhouri had recently co-authored a book titled (Universal Acquaintance: Towards a contemporary view of Mosque architecture). The publication critically discusses the idea of the future mosque.

- The Vitruvian Triad as a base for an introduction to the Theory of Architecture; A Pedagogical Approach.
- An Ascending Manifesto for Post-war Reconstruction of Syria.
- The Five Envelops of Architecture in the Art of Shazly Khan.
- Beyond Morphology, in Mediterranean Housing Cultures.
- Architecture & The Middle East: International panel discussion.
- Universal Acquaintance; Towards a Contemporary View of Mosque Architecture.

== Reception ==
- Mashari Al-Naim, a Famous Arab architectural critic wrote: "Wael Samhouri's architecture raises many questions about identity, as it is an architecture that escapes from the tight prison of traditions and opens itself up to a development that embodies the spirit of the time." "His architecture is worthy of consideration and study, as it does not leave itself to the whim of the “prevalent” and “required” that many Arab architects fell into. Therefore, we see what there is [in his work] what we can look, into and around, to establish a contemporary Arabic language in architecture."
- "By treating tradition as more than just an old pattern book, Samhouri’s building [al-Hasani Religious Center] shows that cultural awareness in architecture can mean something deeper than decorated monoliths."
