= Impark =

North American parking management company

Imperial Parking Canada Corporation, Imperial Parking (U.S.), Inc.
- Company type: Privately Held Company
- Industry: Parking
- Founded: 1962; 64 years ago
- Headquarters: Vancouver, British Columbia, Canada
- Products: Parking, Valet parking
- Number of employees: 9,000+ (2020)
- Parent: Reef Technology
- Website: www.impark.com

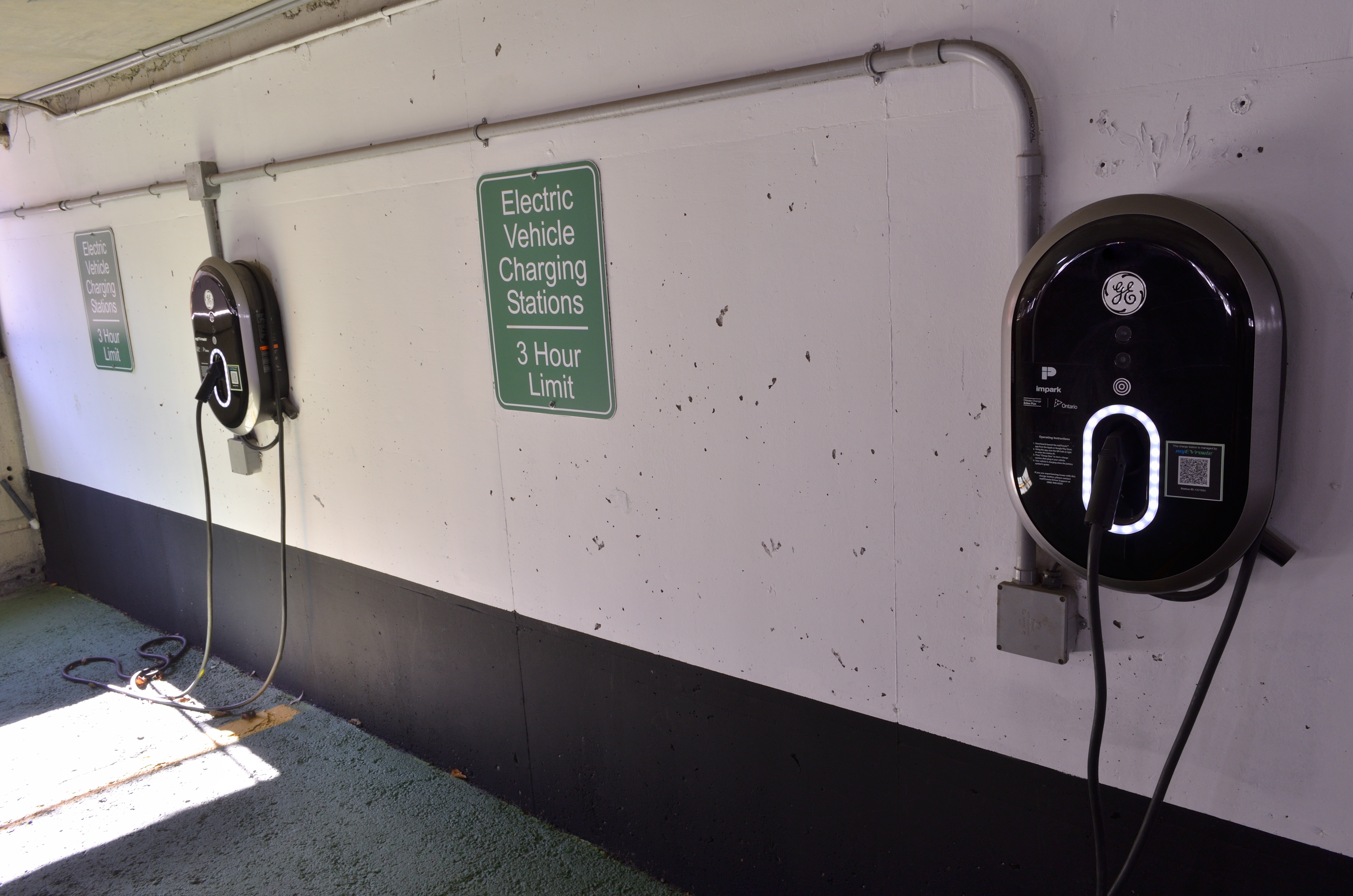
Impark EV charging stations

Impark (Imperial Parking Corporation) is a North American parking management company. As of 2020 it was one of the largest parking management companies in North America, operating approximately 3,400 parking facilities with 9,000 employees in more than 240 cities across the United States and Canada.

== History ==
On July 26, 2011, the Ontario Teachers' Pension Plan announced that it had acquired Impark for an undisclosed sum.

On October 1, 2015, Impark announced that it had completed the acquisition of the assets of San Francisco Parking, Inc. ("City Park"), a parking management company based in San Francisco, California.

On April 8, 2016, Impark acquired Republic Parking System to create one of North America's biggest parking management companies. As a division of Impark, Republic Parking will maintain its headquarters in Chattanooga and its name on more than 770 properties the company operates for cities and airports across the country.

On December 10, 2018, Impark entered into an agreement to be acquired by SoftBank Group funded ParkJockey and Mubadala Investment Company. On June 26, 2019, ParkJockey changed its name to Reef Technology
