= Gyula Rimanóczy =

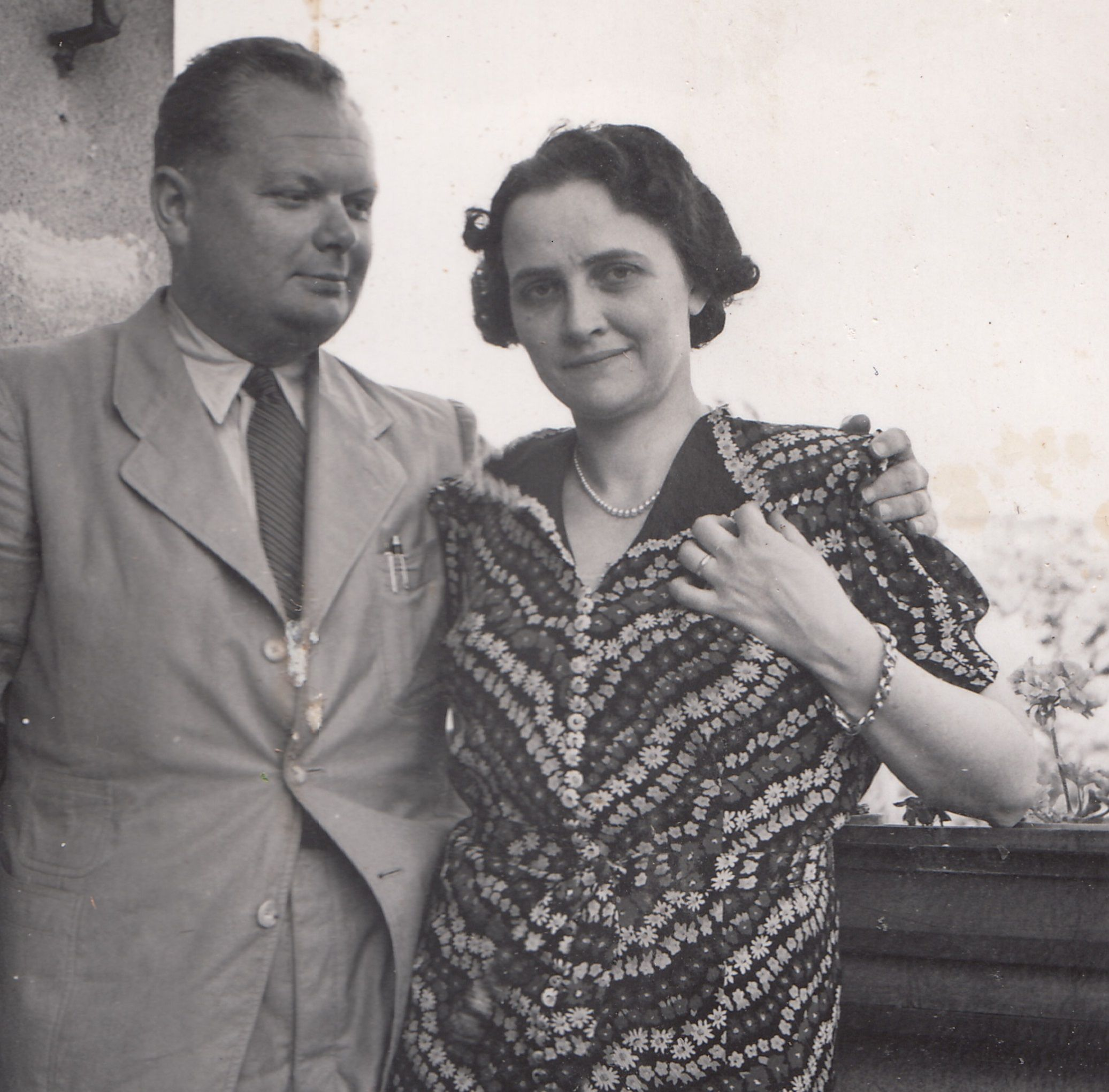
Gyula Rimanóczy with his wife in 1942

Gyula Rimanóczy (19 January 1903 – 19 December 1958) architect, one of the important figures of the inter-war year avant garde period.

Rimanóczy was born in Vienna, Austria. He died, aged 55, in Budapest.

== Works ==
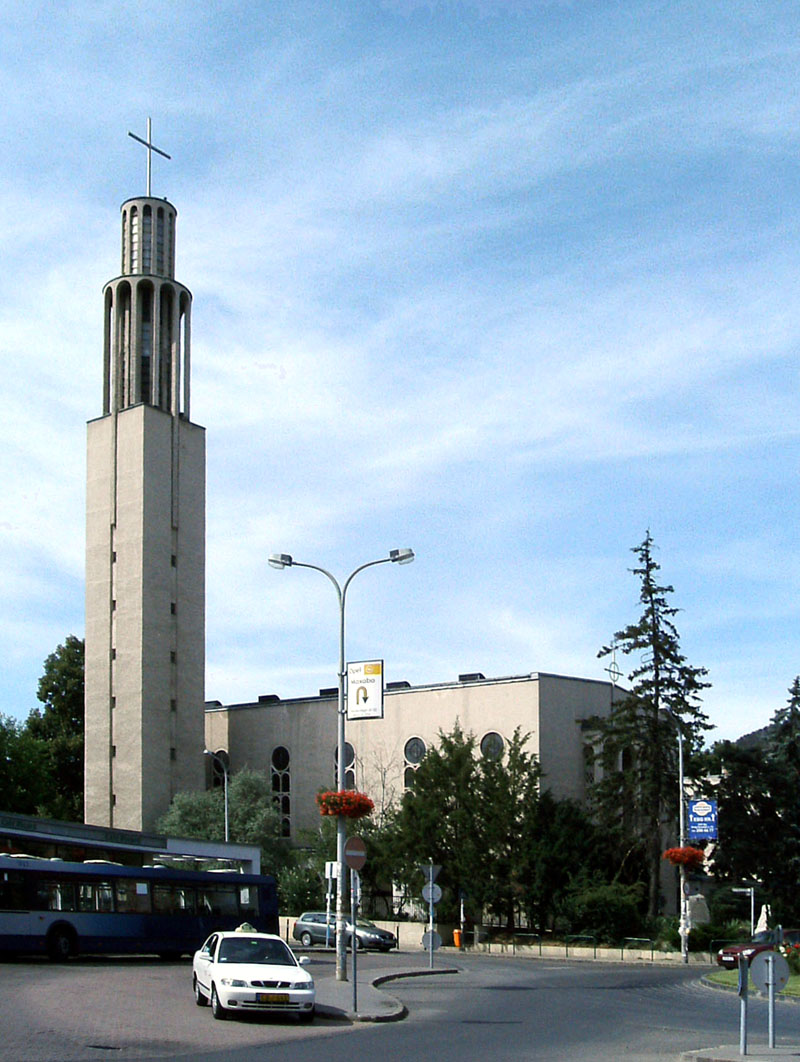
Pasaret church, plan of Gyula Rimanóczy

- Pasarét church, Budapest

== Prizes ==
1953- received Ybl prize for his life work. Also received the Kossuth Prize the same year for his role in the building of the Budapest Technical University "R" wing.

== Legacy ==
His collected works are archived in the Architecture Museum.
