= Peter Janesch =

Hungarian architect

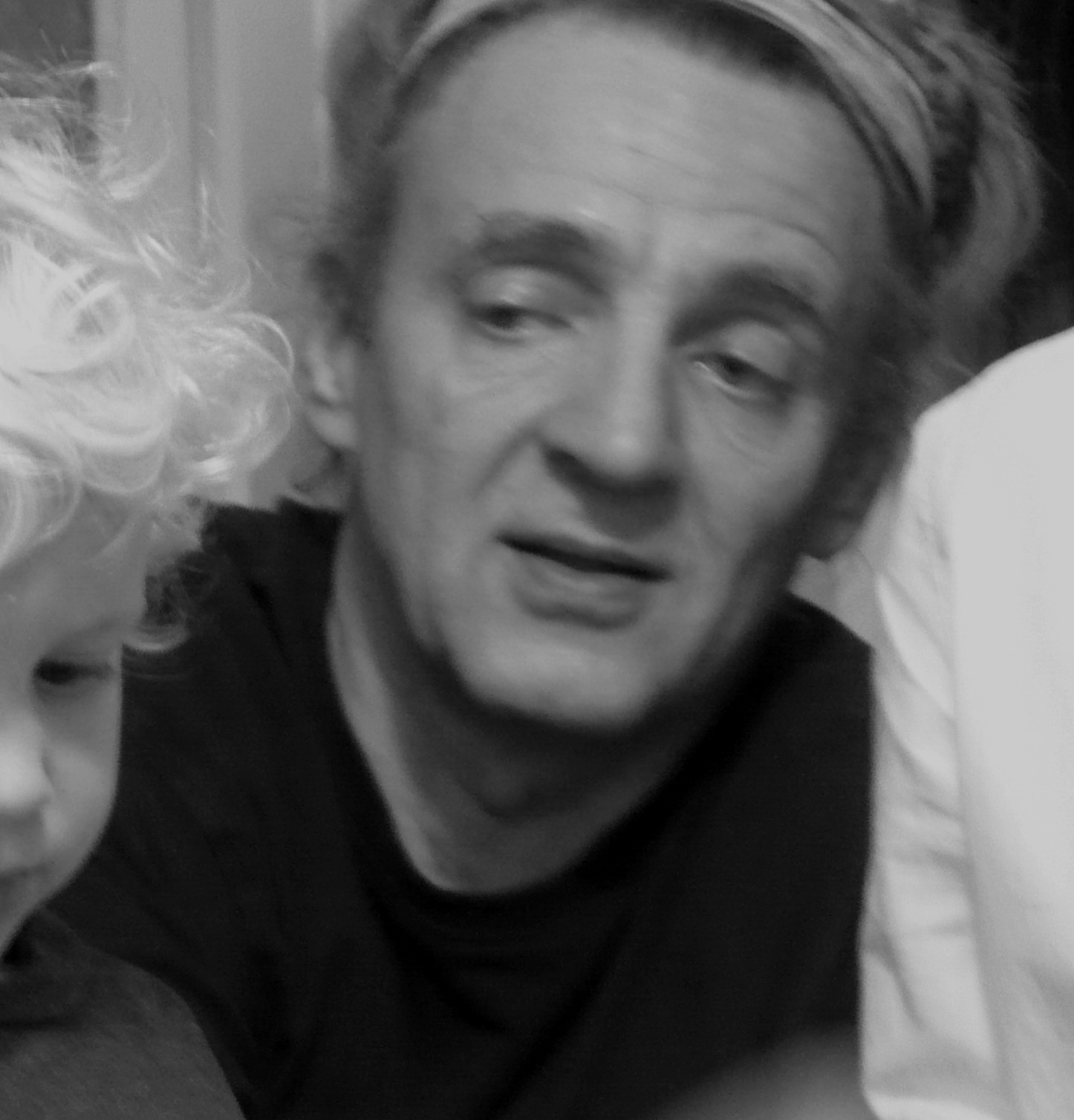
Péter Janesch

Péter Janesch (born 7 November 1953 in Budapest) is a Hungarian architect.

== Life ==
In 1973, Janesch studied interior design at the Hungarian School of Applied Arts under Gyorgy Nanossy, Peter Reimholz, György Szrogh and Ferenc Vamossy. In 1982, he began as a student at the Hungarian School of Building. He eventually became a lecturer there and at the School of Applied Arts. He became a master of teaching architecture and traveled to Japan in 1990 to research this field. He also curated the Hungarian pavilion at the 2004 Venice Biennale.

== Works ==
- First prize for Budapest government district plan with the firm minusplus architects. (2007)
