= Igreja Nossa Senhora do Brasil =

Catholic church in São Paulo, Brazil

Church of Our Lady of Brazil
- Igreja Nossa Senhora do Brasil
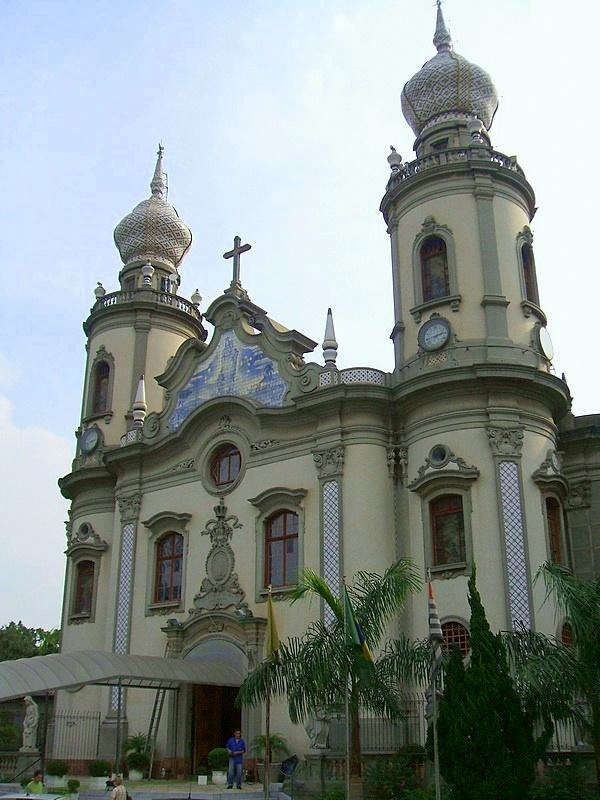
- Church of Our Lady of Brazil
- 23°34′10″S 46°40′19″W
- Location: São Paulo, São Paulo; Brazil
- Country: Brazil
- Denomination: Roman Catholic
- Website: www.nossasenhoradobrasil.com.br

Architecture
- Architect: Bruno Simões Magro
- Style: Baroque
- Completed: 1958

Clergy
- Priest: Michelino Roberto

The Church of Our Lady of Brazil (Portuguese: Igreja Nossa Senhora do Brasil) is a Catholic church in Nossa Senhora do Brasil Square, in the Brazilian city of São Paulo. The current building was constructed in 1942.

The creative design and decoration was done by the modernist artist Antônio Paim Vieira. Construction was carried out by the engineering firm Tavares Pinheiro S.A. based on a project by the architect Bruno Simões Magro. The building features a neo-Baroque design, similar to the Church of Saint Francis in Ouro Preto.

== History ==
The construction of the church was approved at a meeting at the Banco Comercial do Estado de São Paulo. The executive committee included the then Deputy Monsignor João Batista de Carvalho as chairman, Emanuel Whitaker as secretary and Alcides Vidigal as treasurer. The original design of the building in the Brazilian colonial style belonged to engineer George Przirembel. However, the project that was executed was done by the architect Bruno Simões Magro, professor at the Faculty of Architecture and Urbanism at the University of São Paulo.

Construction began in 1942 on a site provided by the City Hall. The work was carried out by Tavares Pinheiro S.A. under the direction of engineer Breno Tavares. The work continued for fourteen years, until a specialized company began the internal decoration. Antônio Paim Vieira, a painter and ceramist, created the interior decoration based on Brazilian culture. His painting in the center of the chancel ceiling shows the Virgin and Child surrounded by representatives of the various Brazilian regions dressed in typical clothing.

== Architectural features ==
The architecture of the Church of Our Lady of Brazil is inspired by the temples of Minas Gerais and Portugal. It features ceramic tile panels similar to the Church of Saint Basil in Moscow, and the balustrade of the towers resembles Muslim minarets. The interior contains the carved wooden high altar that belonged to the Church of Saint Anne in Mogi das Cruzes, dated to 1740. The Via Crucis tiles are on the walls, painted frame by frame in blue with a white background. The ceiling of the church contains reproductions of paintings from the Sistine Chapel in the Vatican.

The main nave measures around 40 meters long and 12 meters wide, with an 11 meter ceiling height. Adjacent to the main nave there are smaller spaces:

- Chapel of Saint Joseph;
- Chapel of the Blessed Sacrament;
- Chapel of the Sacred Heart of Jesus;
- Chapel of Saint Anthony, Saint Jude and Saint Teresa;
- Chapel of Our Lady of Aparecida;
- Confessional hall;
- Sacristy anteroom;
- Sacristy.

== Gallery ==
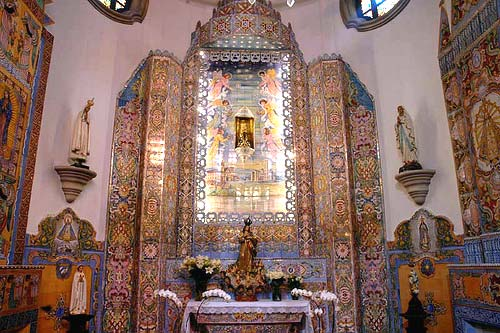
Altar of the Virgins.

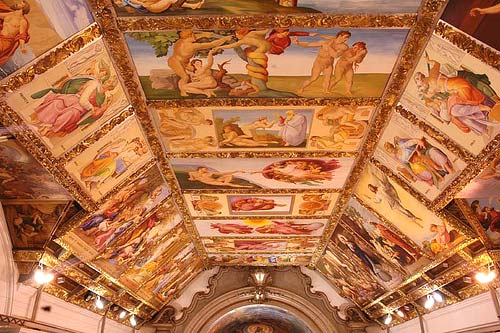
Church roof.

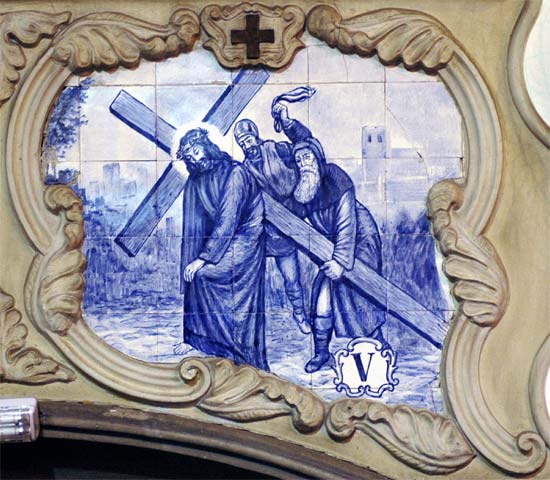
Tiled Way of the Cross in the church.

== See also ==
- Tourism in the city of São Paulo
