= Church of Saint Anthony of Padua, Busovača =

Coordinates: 44.1002°N 17.8814°E

Church of Saint Anthony of Padua
- Crkva svetog Antuna Padovanskog
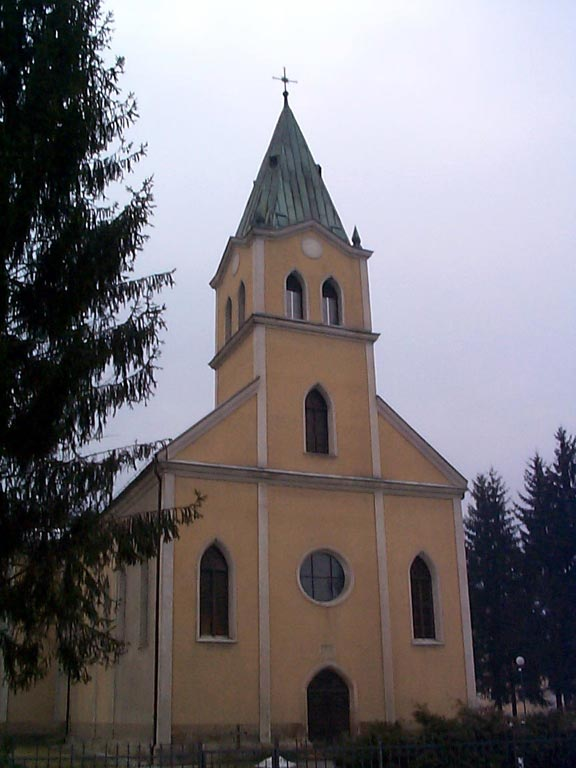
- Church of Saint Anthony of Padua
- Location: Busovača
- Country: Bosnia and Herzegovina
- Denomination: Roman Catholic

History
- Status: Parish church
- Dedication: Saint Anthony of Padua

Architecture
- Functional status: Active
- Groundbreaking: 1881
- Completed: 1885

Administration
- Archdiocese: Archdiocese of Vrhbosna
- Parish: Parish of Saint Anthony of Padua - Busovača

Clergy
- Archbishop: Vinko Puljić

The Church of Saint Anthony of Padua (Croatian: Crkva svetog Antuna Padovanskog) is a Roman Catholic church in Busovača, Bosnia and Herzegovina.
