= Castle Hotel, Conwy =

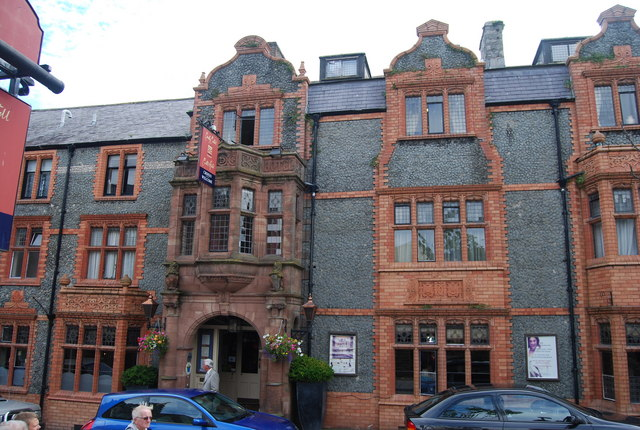
- Part of the frontage of Castle Hotel, Conwy
- Interactive map of Castle Hotel, Conwy
- 53.2812°N 3.8292°W
- Location: High Street, Conwy, Wales

History
- Rebuilt: 1885

Site notes
- Architect: Douglas and Fordham
- Architectural style: Renaissance

Listed Building – Grade II
- Designated: 6 May 1976
- Reference no.: 3301

Castle Hotel is in High Street, opposite to the entrance to Llewelyn Street, in Conwy, Wales. It is designated by Cadw as a Grade II listed building.

== History ==
The hotel stands on the site of a former Cistercian abbey. Until the 1880s it was occupied by a public house, the King's Head, dating from the 15th century, and the Castle Hotel. In 1885 the building was completely remodelled by the Chester firm of architects Douglas and Fordham. The whole building was developed into a hotel, and a new section was added. The hotel has been visited by a number of well-known guests, including Thomas Telford, William Wordsworth, and the Queen of Romania, who lunched in the restaurant.

== Architecture ==
Seen from High Street, the hotel is in three sections, each of which has three storeys. To the left is a single-bay section, the former public house; the central section, developed from the older hotel, has four bays; and the section to the right, added in 1885, has three bays. The whole building is in Renaissance style. When Douglas and Fordham remodelled the building, they used small broken pieces of limestone as a facing material, giving the frontage a flint-like appearance. The dressings of the windows are in brick and terracotta. The central bay is in red ashlar sandstone and the roof is tiled.

== Present day ==
For many years the hotel was run by companies based in London. Since 2000 it has been in private ownership.

== See also ==
- List of houses and associated buildings by John Douglas
