= 1972 in architecture =

The year 1972 in architecture involved some significant architectural events and new buildings.

== Events ==
- March 16 – Demolition of the Pruitt–Igoe public housing project designed by Minoru Yamasaki in St. Louis, Missouri, USA, begins; the event represents the end of modern architecture, according to critic Charles Jencks.
- date unknown
  - India passes the Architects Act, governing the professional practice of architecture in India.
  - Yale University designates the Yale School of Architecture as a separate professional school.

== Buildings and structures ==
=== Buildings opened ===
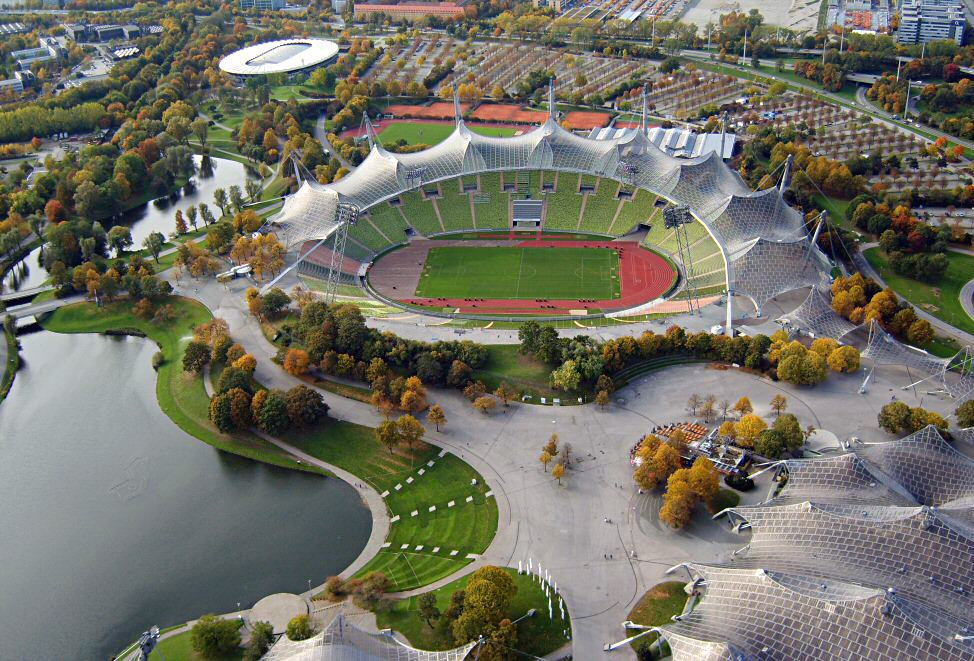
Olympiastadion (Munich), Germany

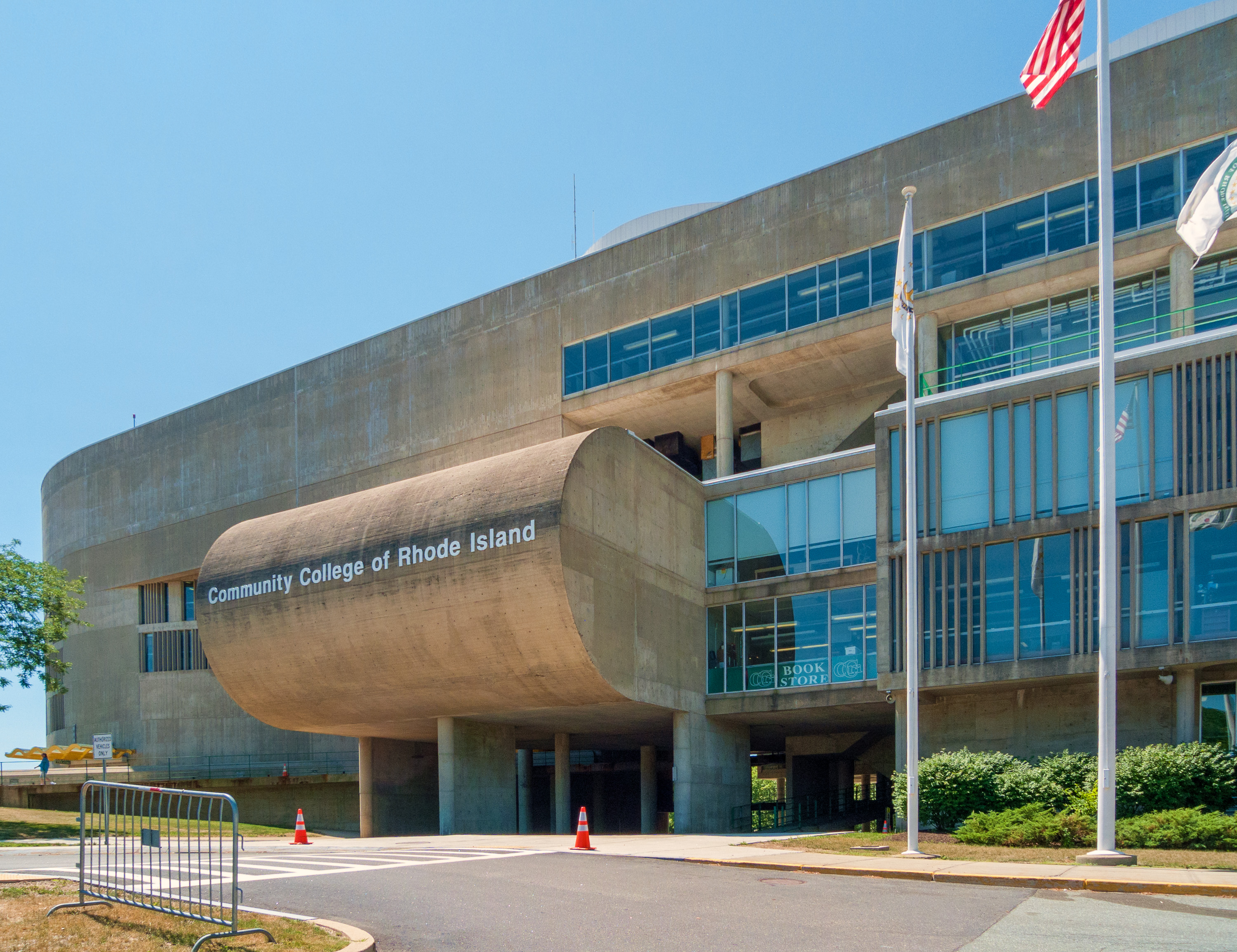
CCRI Knight campus by Perkins and Will

- January – The South Tower (2WTC) of the World Trade Center in New York City, the second tallest building in the world at this time, designed by Minoru Yamasaki, opens to its first tenants. The North Tower (1WTC) is also completed in this year.
- April 17 – The Wells Fargo Center (opened as First National Bank Tower) in Portland, Oregon, United States, designed by Charles Luckman and Associates.
- May 26 – Olympiastadion (Munich) for the 1972 Summer Olympics in Germany, designed by Gunter Behnisch with roof structure by Frei Otto.
- September — The Knight Campus of Community College of Rhode Island, designed in the Brutalist style by Perkins and Will
- October 4 – Kimbell Art Museum in Fort Worth, Texas, designed by Louis Kahn.

=== Buildings completed ===
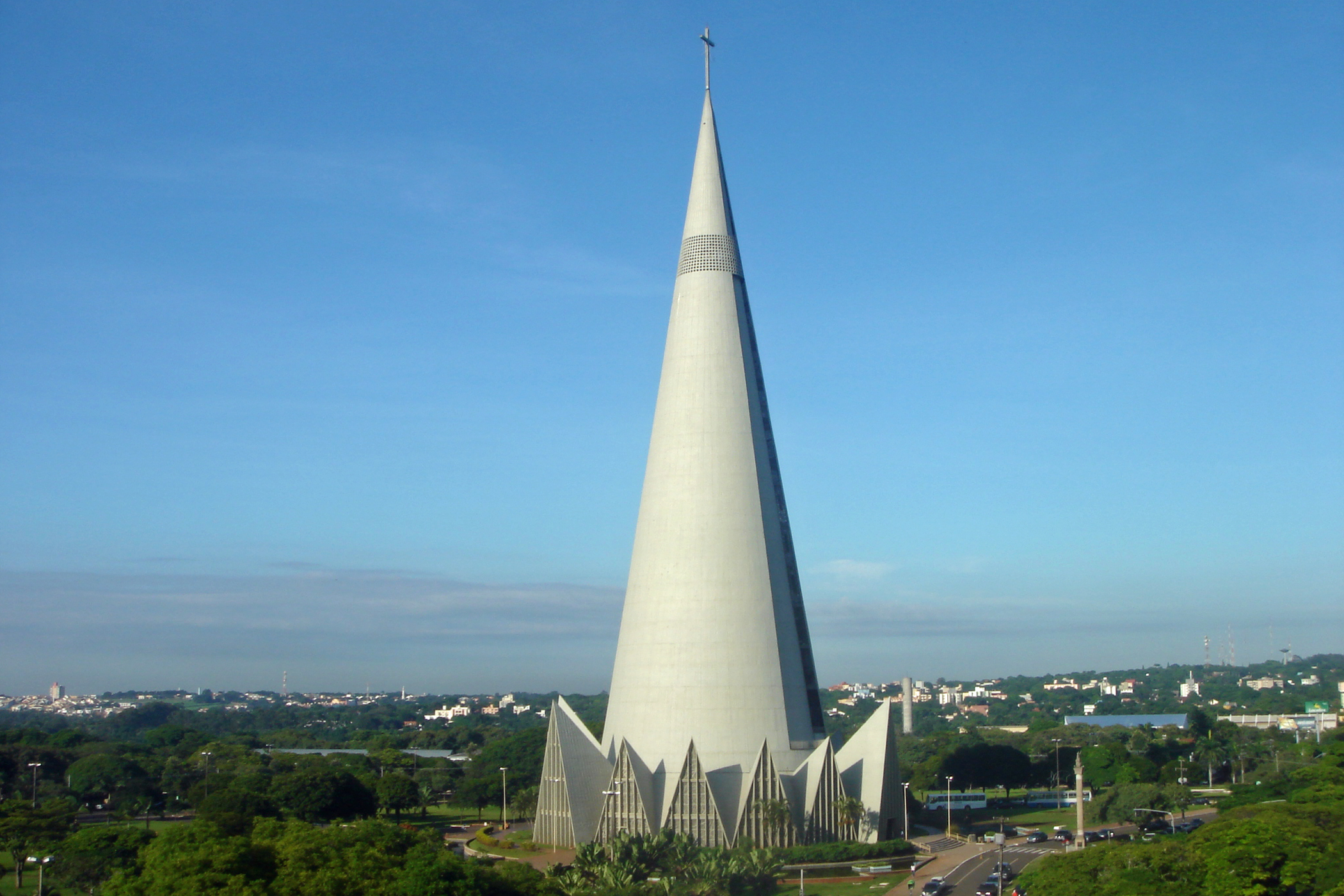
Catedral de Maringá, Maringá, Brazil

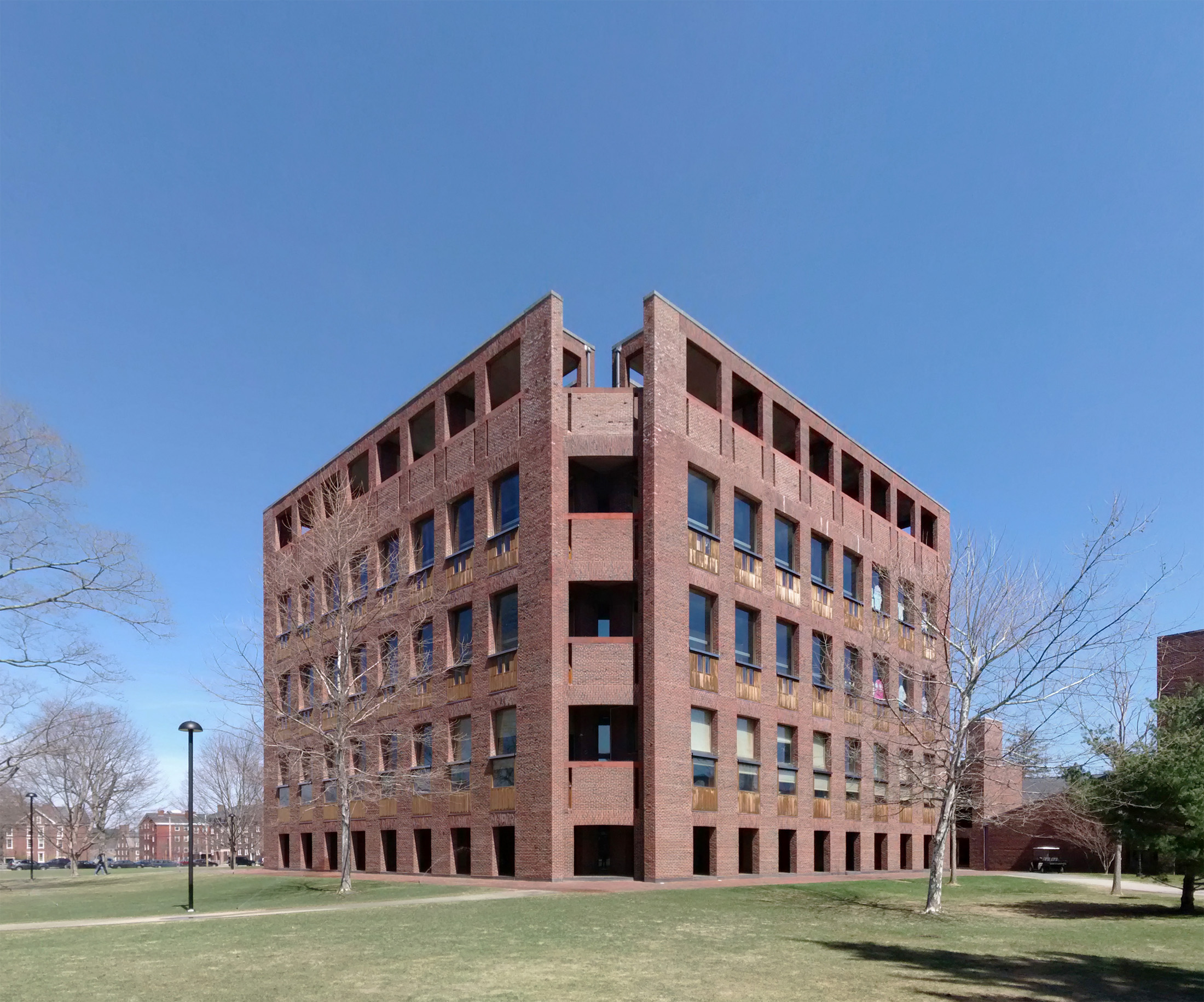
Phillips Exeter Academy Library, Exeter, New Hampshire, USA

- May 10 – The Catedral de Maringá in Maringá, Paraná, Brazil is completed and is one of the tallest churches/cathedrals in the world.
- June 8 – KUNSTEN Museum of Modern Art Aalborg, Denmark, by Alvar and Elissa Aalto and Jean-Jacques Baruël.
- 55 Water Street, designed by Emery Roth and Sons and Lee Jablin, Lower Manhattan, New York City, USA.
- W. R. Grace Building in New York, USA.
- Chase Tower in Phoenix, designed by Welton Becket and Associates is completed, becoming the tallest building in the southwest United States.
- Brunswick Centre in London, UK, designed by Patrick Hodgkinson.
- Robin Hood Gardens council housing complex in the London Borough of Tower Hamlets, UK, designed by Alison and Peter Smithson (demolished 2017– ).
- Trellick Tower in North Kensington, London, UK, by Ernő Goldfinger.
- Hill House (private residence and art gallery for Tim Sainsbury) near Headley, East Hampshire, England, designed by Denys Lasdun.
- Brion-Vega Cemetery, San Vito d'Alvitole, Italy, by Carlo Scarpa.
- The Burroughs Wellcome Building (now renamed the Elion-Hitchings Building) in Durham, North Carolina, United States by Paul Rudolph (partially demolished 2014).
- Centraal Beheer, Apeldoorn, Netherlands, by Herman Hertzberger.
- Phillips Exeter Academy Library, Exeter, New Hampshire, USA, designed by Louis Kahn.
- Library of Downside Abbey, Somerset, UK, designed by Francis Pollen.
- City Theater of Tehran, Iran, designed by Ali Sardar Afkhami.
- Commerce Court West in Toronto, Ontario, Canada is completed and becomes the tallest building in the British Commonwealth (1972–1975).
- Transamerica Pyramid in San Francisco, California, United States.
- One Penn Plaza in New York City, New York, United States.
- High Point, Bradford, England (office block), by John Brunton Partnership.
- The Fernmeldeturm Frauenkopf (Stuttgarter Fernmeldeturm) in Stuttgart, Germany.
- The Camlica TV Tower in Istanbul, Turkey.
- The Dorint Hotel Tower in Augsburg, Germany is completed and opened.
- Olivetti UK regional offices in Carlisle, Derby, Dundee and Belfast, designed by Edward Cullinan.
- Daniel Burke Library at Hamilton College, Clinton, New York, by Hugh Stubbins

== Awards ==
- AIA Gold Medal – Pietro Belluschi
- Architecture Firm Award – Caudill Rowlett Scott
- RAIA Gold Medal – Ted Farmer
- RIBA Royal Gold Medal – Louis Kahn
- AIA Twenty-five Year Award – Baldwin Hills Village

== Publications ==
- John Betjeman – A Pictorial History of English Architecture.
- Robert Venturi, Steven Izenour and Denise Scott Brown – Learning from Las Vegas.

== Births ==
- April 9 – Siiri Vallner, Estonian architect

== Deaths ==
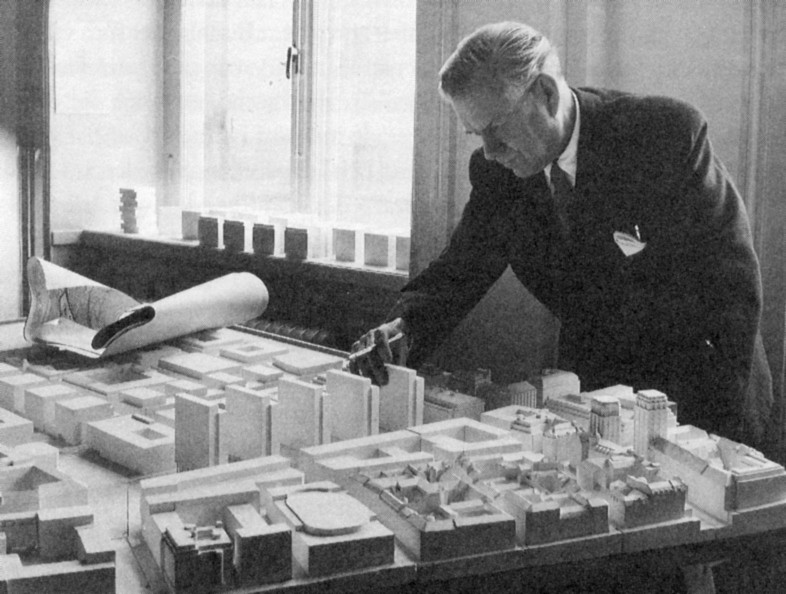
Sven Markelius

- January 9 – Liang Sicheng, Chinese architect (born 1901)
- February 11 – Jan Wils, Dutch architect (born 1891)
- February 24 – Sven Markelius, Swedith modernist architect (born 1889)
- June 19 – Elisabeth Scott, English architect, designer of the Shakespeare Memorial Theatre at Stratford-upon-Avon, the first important public building in Britain to be designed by a female architect (born 1898)
- November 25 – Hans Scharoun, German organic and expressionist architect (born 1893)
- December 14 – Yoshikazu Uchida, Japanese architect and structural engineer (born 1885)
