= Marc Camoletti (architect) =

Swiss architect

Marc Camoletti (12 August 1857 - 13 December 1940) was a Swiss architect.

Camoletti was born in Cartigny. He designed the Museum of art and history in Geneva. He died in Geneva, aged 83.
