= 1932 in architecture =

List of years in architecture	(table)
- … 1922; 1923; 1924; 1925; 1926; 1927; 1928; 1929; 1930; 1931; 1932; 1933; 1934; 1935; 1936; 1937; 1938; 1939; 1940; 1941; 1942 …
- Buildings and structures: Art; Archaeology; Architecture; Literature; Music; Philosophy; Science; +...

The year 1932 in architecture involved some significant events.

== Events ==
- International Style by Philip Johnson and Henry-Russell Hitchcock is published.
- The International Exhibition of Modern Architecture at the Museum of Modern Art in New York spreads the International Style.
- John Wiley & Sons publishes Architectural Graphic Standards by Charles George Ramsey (1884–1963) and Harold Reeve Sleeper, the first book to present the accepted architectural practices of the time in a clear and accessible graphic form.

== Buildings and structures ==
=== Buildings opened ===
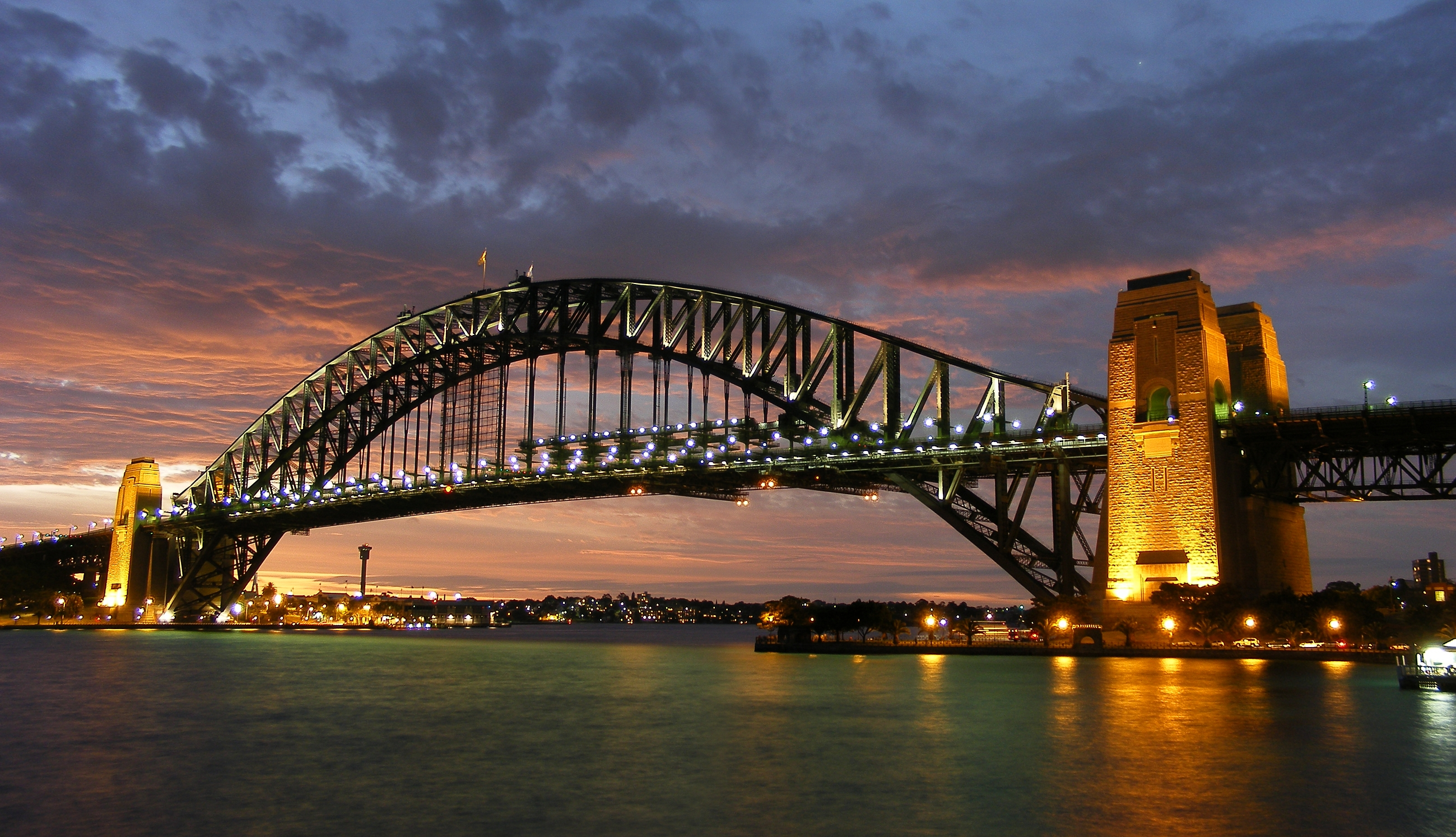
Sydney Harbour Bridge, Australia

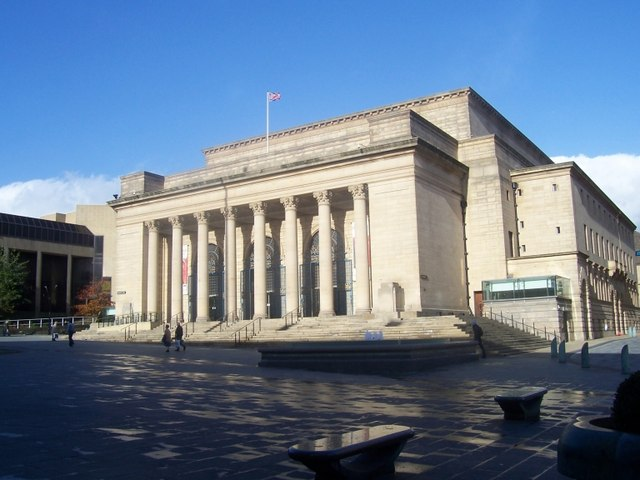
Sheffield City Hall, Yorkshire, England

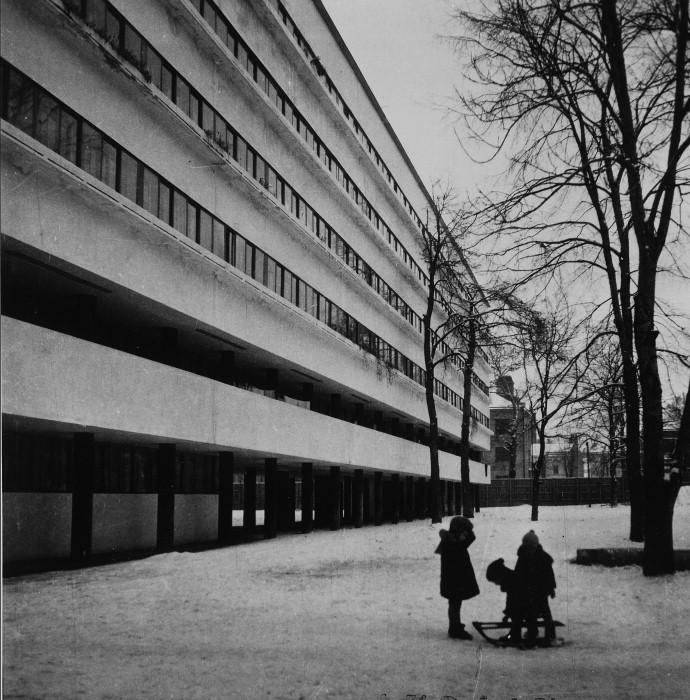
Narkomfin building in Moscow, Russia

- March 19 – Sydney Harbour Bridge, designed by John Bradfield (engineer), is opened in Sydney, Australia.
- April 23 – New Shakespeare Memorial Theatre at Stratford-upon-Avon, designed by Elisabeth Scott, is opened, becoming the first important work erected in the United Kingdom by a woman architect.
- July 19 – Lambeth Bridge, London, designed by engineer Sir George Humphreys and architects Sir Reginald Blomfield and G. Topham Forrest.
- August 1 – Thiepval Memorial, designed by Sir Edwin Lutyens, is inaugurated in the Somme (France).
- August 7 – Douaumont ossuary, designed by Léon Azéma to house the bones of at least 130,000 unidentified soldiers of both sides who died in the Battle of Verdun.
- September 19 – Arnos Grove tube station, London, designed by Charles Holden.
- September 22 – Sheffield City Hall, Yorkshire, England, designed by Vincent Harris in 1920.
- November 16 – Parliament Buildings (Northern Ireland), Belfast, designed by Sir Arnold Thornely.
- November 25 – Saint Sophia Cathedral in Harbin, China.
- November 27 – Bixby Creek Bridge at Big Sur, California, designed by C. H. Purcell and F. W. Panhorst.

=== Other new buildings ===
- Loews Philadelphia Hotel in Center City Philadelphia, designed by George Howe and William Lescaze, the first International Style skyscraper in the United States.
- Leopoldine-Glöckel-yard (residence), Vienna, Austria, designed by Josef Frank (in honour of Leopoldine Glöckel).
- High Cross House, Dartington Hall, Devon, England, designed by William Lescaze.
- Deneke Building at Lady Margaret Hall, Oxford, England, designed by Giles Gilbert Scott.
- Alameda Theatre (Alameda, California), United States, designed by Timothy L. Pflueger.
- Church of the Most Sacred Heart of Our Lord in Prague, designed by Jože Plečnik.
- Catholic Church of St Engelbert, Cologne, Germany, designed by Dominikus Böhm.
- The Daily Express Building, London, designed by Sir Owen Williams.
- The Hoover Building on the Western Avenue in Perivale, West London, designed by Wallis, Gilbert and Partners in Art Deco style.
- Maison de Verre, Paris, France, by Pierre Chareau, Bernard Bijvoet and Louis Dalbet.
- Paimio Sanatorium in Finland, designed by Alvar Aalto.
- Unilever House in the City of London, designed by James Lomax-Simpson of Unilever with Sir John Burnet and Thomas S. Tait of Sir John Burnet and Partners.
- Immeuble Clarté apartment building in Geneva, designed by Le Corbusier and his cousin, Pierre Jeanneret.
- Narkomfin building (collective apartments) in Moscow, designed by Moisei Ginzburg with Ignaty Milinis in 1928.
- Harnischmacher House in Wiesbaden, Germany, designed by Marcel Breuer.
- Wohnbedarf furniture stores in Switzerland, designed by Marcel Breuer.
- Zollverein Coal Mine Industrial Complex, Shaft 12, Schacht Albert Vögler, Germany, designed by Fritz Schupp and Martin Kremmer.
- Sol Wurtzel House, Bel Air, Los Angeles, designed by Wallace Neff.
- Niagara Mohawk Building in Syracuse, New York, designed by Melvin L. King and firm Bley and Lyman

== Awards ==
- Olympic gold medal – Gustave Saacké, Pierre Bailey and Pierre Montenot for Arena for bulls, Paris.
- Olympic silver medal – John Russell Pope of the United States for Design for Payne Whitney Gymnasium.
- Olympic bronze medal – Richard Konwiartz of Germany for Design for Schlesierkampfbahn, Breslau.
- RIBA Royal Gold Medal – Hendrik Petrus Berlage.
- Grand Prix de Rome, architecture – Camille Montagné.

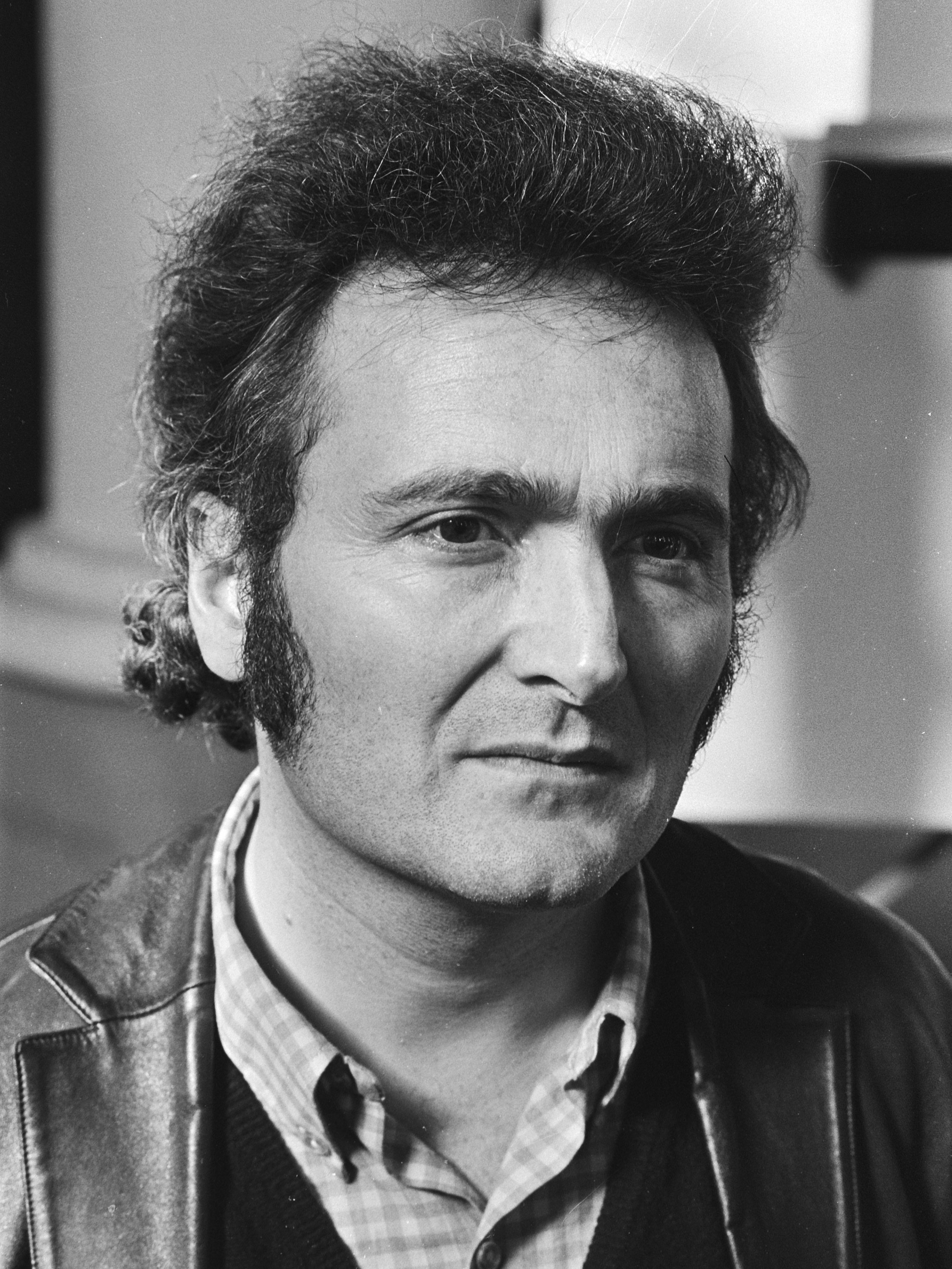
Herman Hertzberger

== Births ==
- June 22 – Anthony Hunt, English structural engineer (died 2022)
- July 6 – Herman Hertzberger, Dutch architect and academic
- July 19 – William S. W. Lim, Singaporean architect (died 2023)
- August 11 – Peter Eisenman, American architect
- September 9 – Carm Lino Spiteri, Maltese architect and politician (died 2008)

== Deaths ==
- April 17 – Sir Patrick Geddes, Scottish urban theorist (born 1854)
- August 19 – E. S. Prior, English Arts and Crafts movement architect and theorist (born 1852)
- November – Abraham E. Lefcourt, American real estate developer (born 1876)
- December 8 – Gertrude Jekyll, English garden designer (born 1843)
- December 28 – Léon Jaussely, French architect and urban planner (born 1857)
