= 1876 in architecture =

The year 1876 in architecture involved some significant architectural events and new buildings.

== Buildings and structures ==
=== Buildings opened ===
- February 2 – Church of St Mary the Virgin, Bury, England, designed by J. S. Crowther.
- August – The Bayreuth Festspielhaus, designed by Gottfried Semper.
- Hotel Sacher in Vienna, Austria.

=== Buildings completed ===
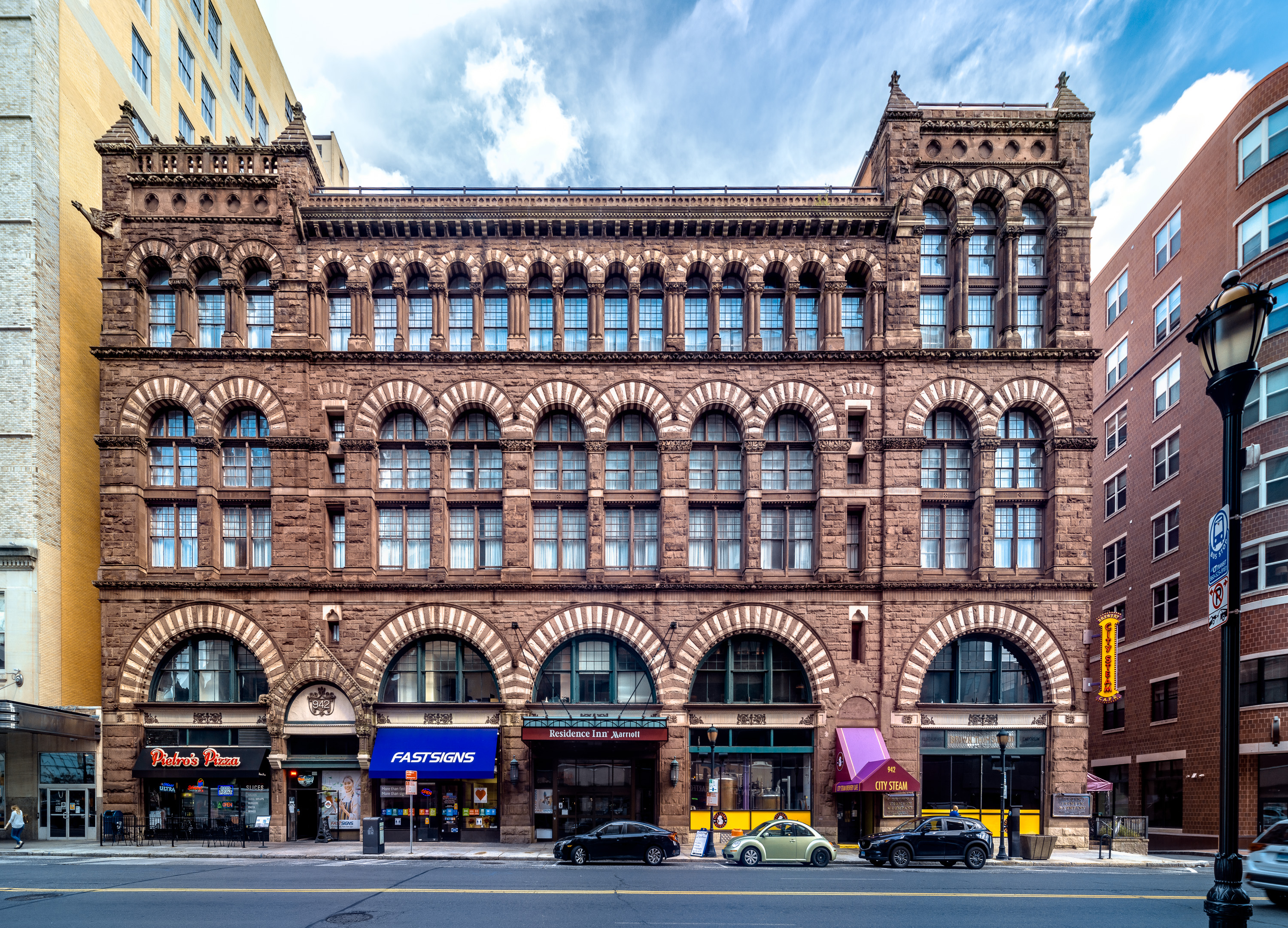
R. and F. Cheney Building, Hartford, Connecticut

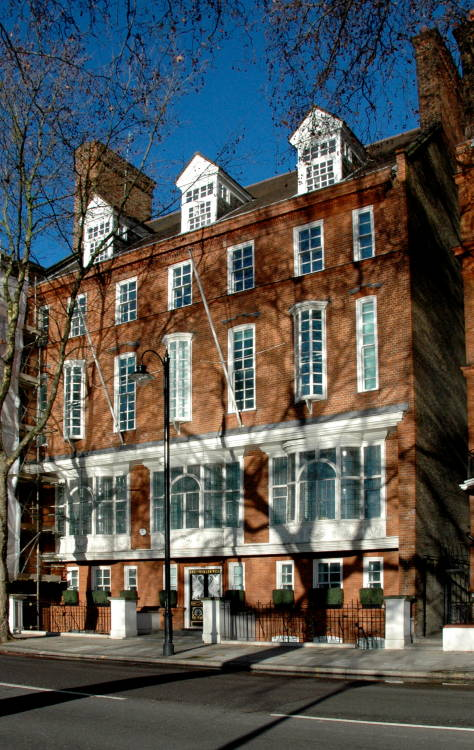
Swan House

- R. and F. Cheney Building, Hartford, Connecticut, designed by Henry Hobson Richardson, considered to be "one of Richardson's greatest buildings"
- Great Zlatoust Church, Yekaterinburg, Russia, designed by Vasily Morgan.
- Government House, Melbourne, Australia, designed by William Wardell.
- Kaahumanu Church, Hawai'i, built by Rev Edward Bailey.
- Pennsylvania Academy of the Fine Arts, Philadelphia, designed by Frank Furness and George Hewitt.
- Swan House (Chelsea Embankment), London, designed by Richard Norman Shaw.
- Nádasdy Mansion, Nádasdladány, Hungary, designed by István Linzbauer and Alajos Hauszmann.
- The Midland Grand Hotel at St Pancras railway station in London, designed by George Gilbert Scott, is fully completed.

== Awards ==
- RIBA Royal Gold Medal – Joseph-Louis Duc.
- Grand Prix de Rome, architecture: Paul Blondel.

== Births ==
- March 27 – A. E. Lefcourt, born Abraham Elias Lefkowitz, English-born New York real estate developer (died 1932)
- May 18 – Thorvald Astrup, Norwegian industrial architect (died 1940)
- June 26 – Vincent Harris, English architect (died 1971)
- October 24 – Paul Philippe Cret, French-American architect and industrial designer (died 1945)
- November 24 – Walter Burley Griffin, American architect and landscape architect (died 1937)

== Deaths ==
- May 7 – David Bryce, Scottish architect (b. 1803),
- August 21 – Ildefons Cerdà, Catalan Spanish urban planner (born 1815)
- date unknown – Jean-Baptiste Schacre, French architect (b. 1808)
