= Lefcourt =

Lefcourt is a surname. Notable people with the surname include:

- Abraham E. Lefcourt (1876–1932), American real estate developer
- Gerald B. Lefcourt, American criminal defense lawyer
- Peter Lefcourt (born 1946), American television producer, film and television screenwriter, and novelist
