= 1843 in architecture =

The year 1843 in architecture involved some significant events.

== Buildings and structures ==
=== Buildings ===
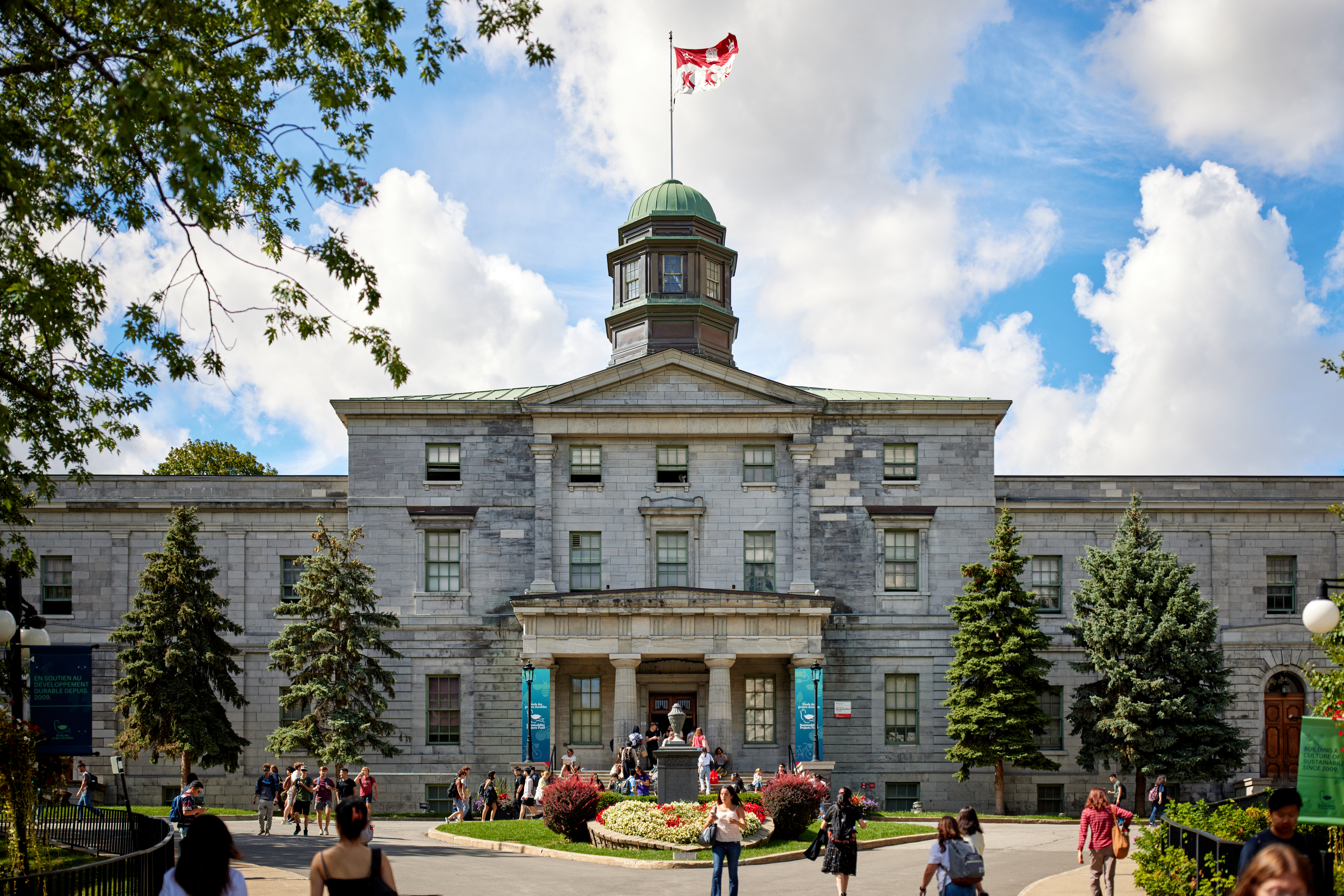
McGill University

- March 25 – The Thames Tunnel in London, constructed by Isambard Kingdom Brunel and Marc Isambard Brunel, the oldest underwater tunnel in the world, opens to the public.
- Nelson's Column in London, designed by William Railton, is completed.
- McGill University's original building, later known as the Arts Building, is completed in Montreal by architect John Ostell.

== Awards ==
- Grand Prix de Rome, architecture: Jacques-Martin Tétaz.

== Births ==
- July 6 – Robert S. Roeschlaub, German-born architect working in Colorado (died 1923)
- November 29 – Gertrude Jekyll, English garden designer (died 1932)

== Deaths ==
- January 13 – Peter Atkinson, English-born architect (born 1776)
