= Kaahumanu Church =

Historic church in Hawaii, United States

- Kaʻahumanu Church
- U.S. National Register of Historic Places
- Hawaiʻi Register of Historic Places
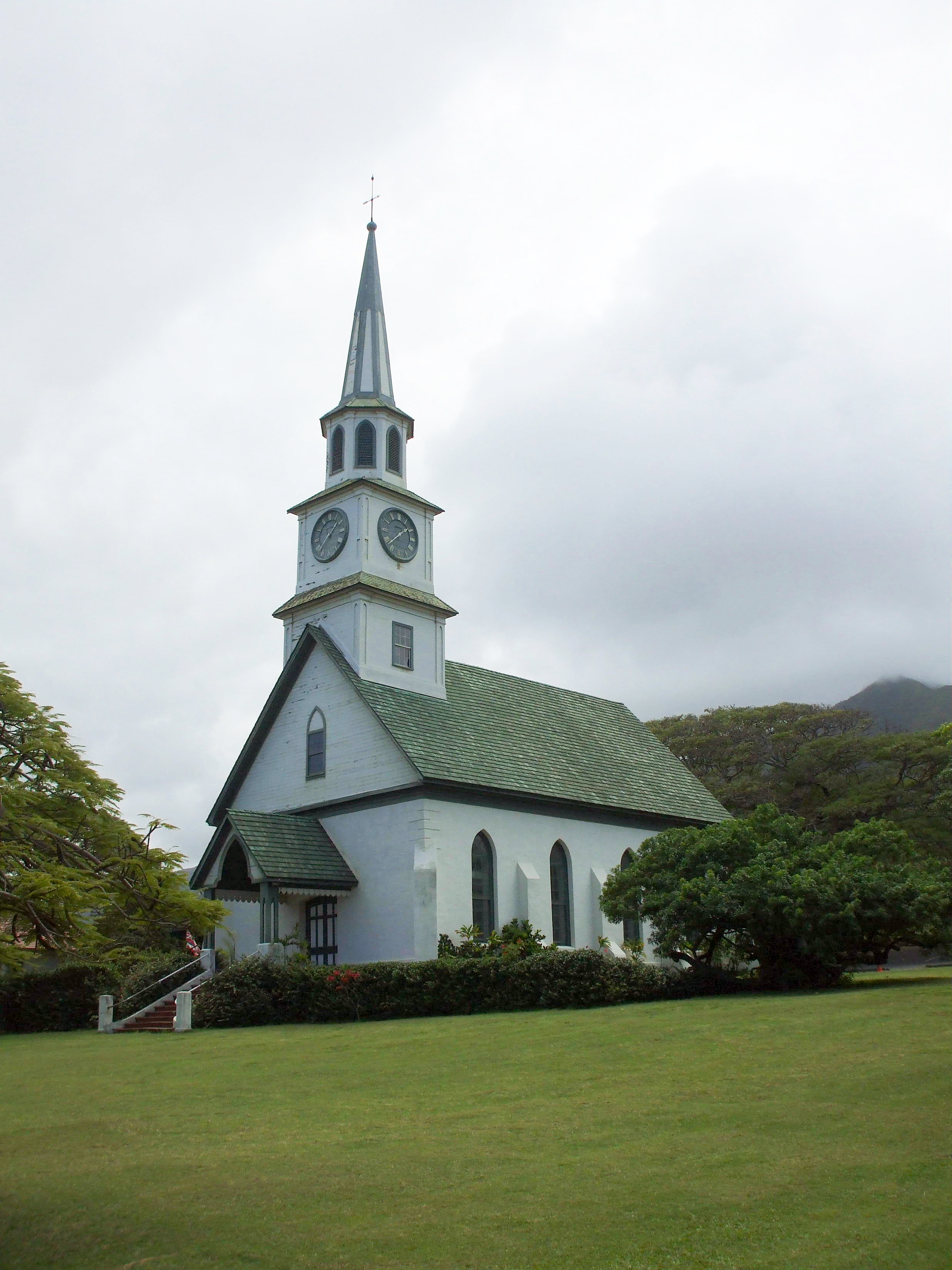
- Shown from north-eastern elevation, March 2010

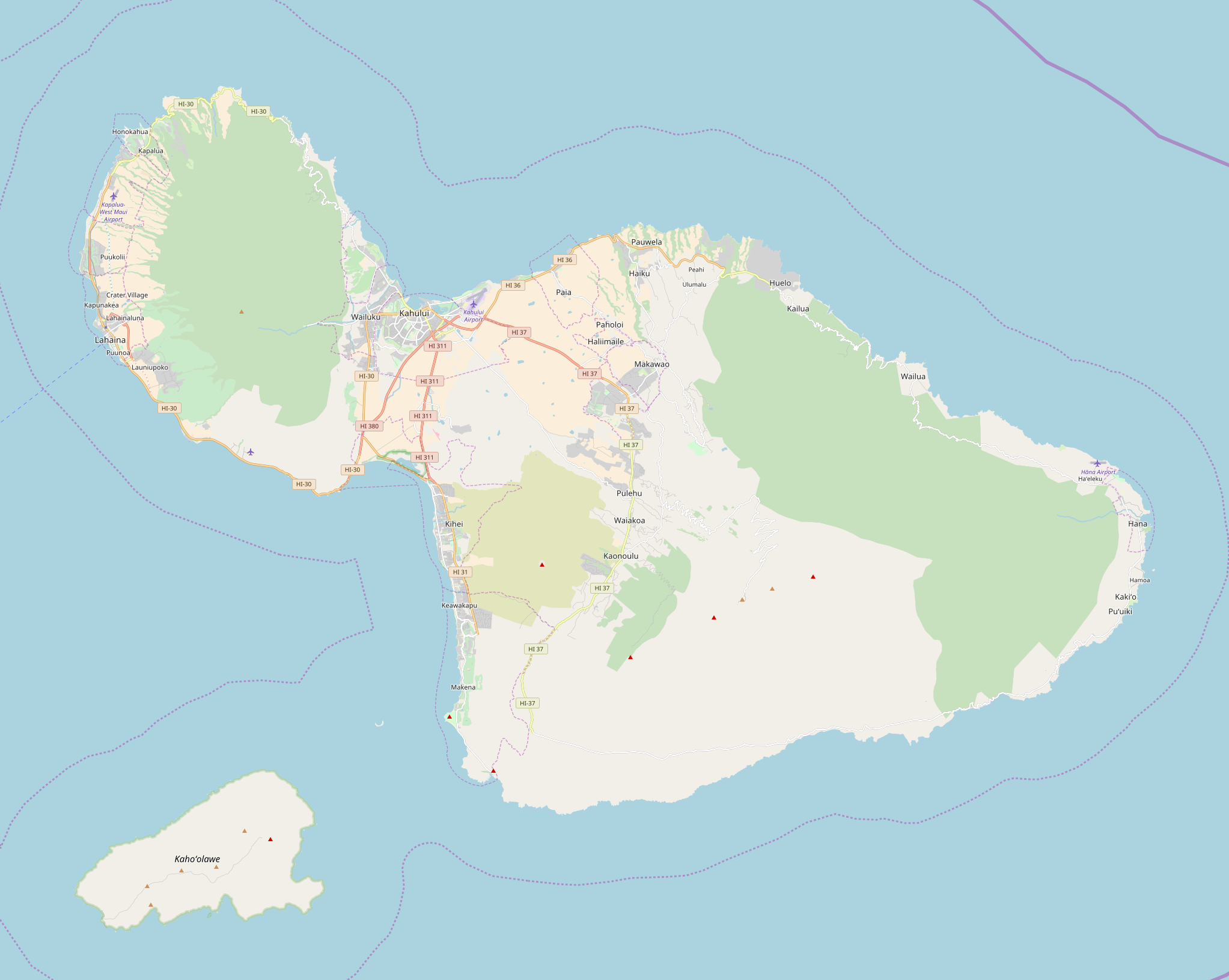
- Location within Maui Location within Hawaii
- Location: 103 South High Street; Wailuku, Maui, Hawaii
- Coordinates: 20°53′49″N 156°30′01″W
- Area: 1.96 acres (7,900 m^{2})
- Built: 1875 (fourth and current structure)
- Architectural style: New England Simple Style Gothic Architecture
- NRHP reference No.: 75000622
- HRHP No.: 50-50-04-01500

Significant dates
- Added to NRHP: May 12, 1975
- Designated HRHP: May 18, 1981

Kaʻahumanu Church is a church in Wailuku, Maui, Hawaii. The hymns and invocation in the services are in the Hawaiian language. which echo the legacy of Hawaiian churches in the survival of the Hawaiian language where it was banned from being spoken in public.

== Origin ==
In 1832, Queen Ka'ahumanu, an early convert into Christianity, visited Maui, and came to the site of the then new Ka'ahumanu Church, witnessing services being presided by Jonathan Smith Green. Upon seeing this, Queen Ka'ahumanu asked the Congregationalist mission to name the permanent church structure after her.

== First, second, and third buildings ==
The original building used by the guest Minister, Jonathan Smith Green, was a shed built on land owned by the Kahale family granted under King Kamehameha III.

In 1834, due to the ballooning congregation numbers (3000 worshipers was noted at one point) a second building was built, which was a thatched structure. However, despite the large worship numbers, the actual permanent membership of the church was small; an 1834-1835 report noted eleven members of the church.

During the "Great Revival" between 1837 and 1840, the church membership ballooned to 487; the 1838-1839 year alone saw 200 new members into the church. With this swell in membership, a new third church structure was built under the supervision of Richard Armstrong after Green left in 1836. Built in 1840, the "two-story" (one floor and a gallery) stone church was 100 by 52 feet (30 by 16 m). However, problems with the roof was noted by Green after his return in 1841 to replace Richard Armstrong. Deemed a "failure" by Green, the roof was fixed after a $648.28 expenditure.

William Patterson Alexander was installed at the church in 1857 after pastor Daniel Conde was not liked by the congregation and a petition to have him removed was circulated. Alexander said that a new church was needed, and advocated building a new one as early as 1866. In 1872 that fund-raising efforts were undertaken by William Pulepule Kahale, the first Native Hawaiian pastor in the church, to build a new structure.

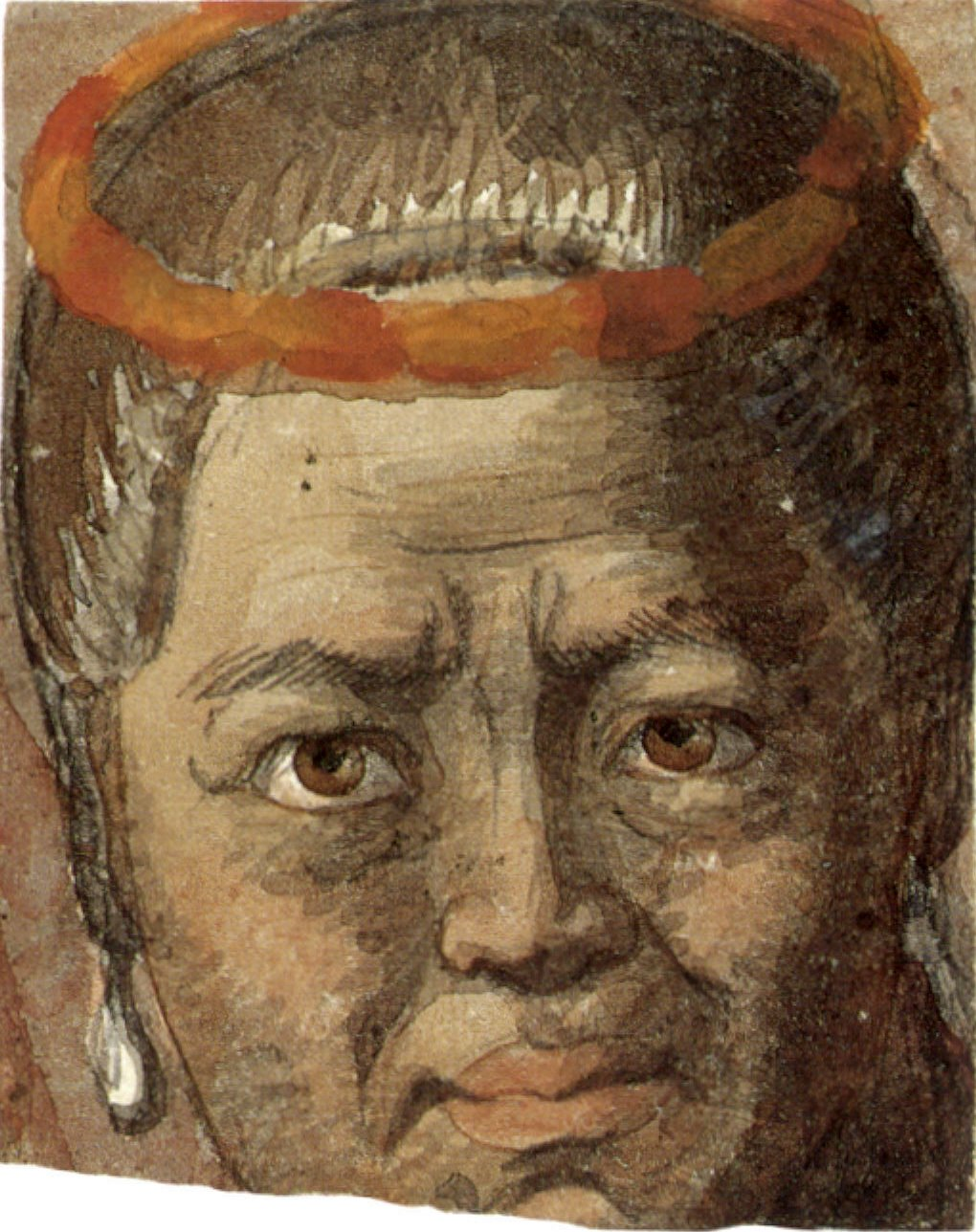
Queen Kaa'humanu asked in 1832 that the church be named for her, which it was in 1876.

== Current building ==
The current structure, the fourth on the site, was built in 1875. It was built to honor Queen Ka'ahumanu's earlier request by Wailuku Sugar Company manager Edward Bailey. It is built in the New England simple style Gothic architecture.

The bell and three clock faces are from the Seth-Thomas clock works, and brought over in 1884 around the Cape Horn. The apparatus was donated by the Bailey family at a cost of $1000.00. Chandeliers were added in 1892. Maui County officials designated the clock in Ka'ahumanu Church as the "Town Clock" in 1964.

== Grounds ==
A stone structure to the rear of the building with one opening exists. This was once used as a bell tower before the current one was constructed. Parts of the original structure of the previous third church is a rock retaining wall fronting the church alongside High Street. Several graves also mark the site. An auxiliary building sits between the church and the Territorial Building in the Wailuku Civic Center Historic District

Honoli'i, one of the first Native Hawaiians to be educated in New England and returning on the sailing ship Thaddeus, is buried in the cemetery.

== Gallery ==
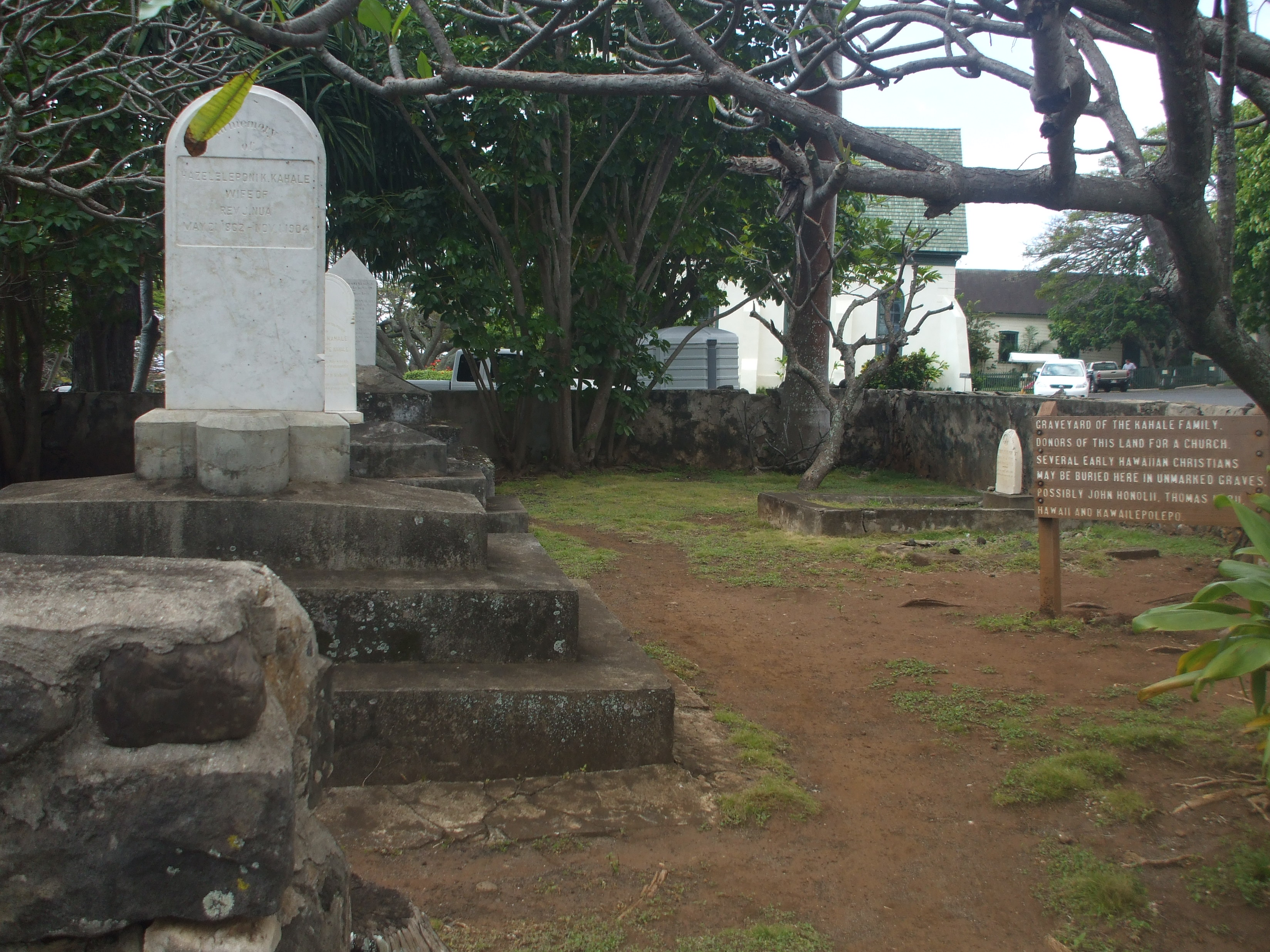
Church cemetery

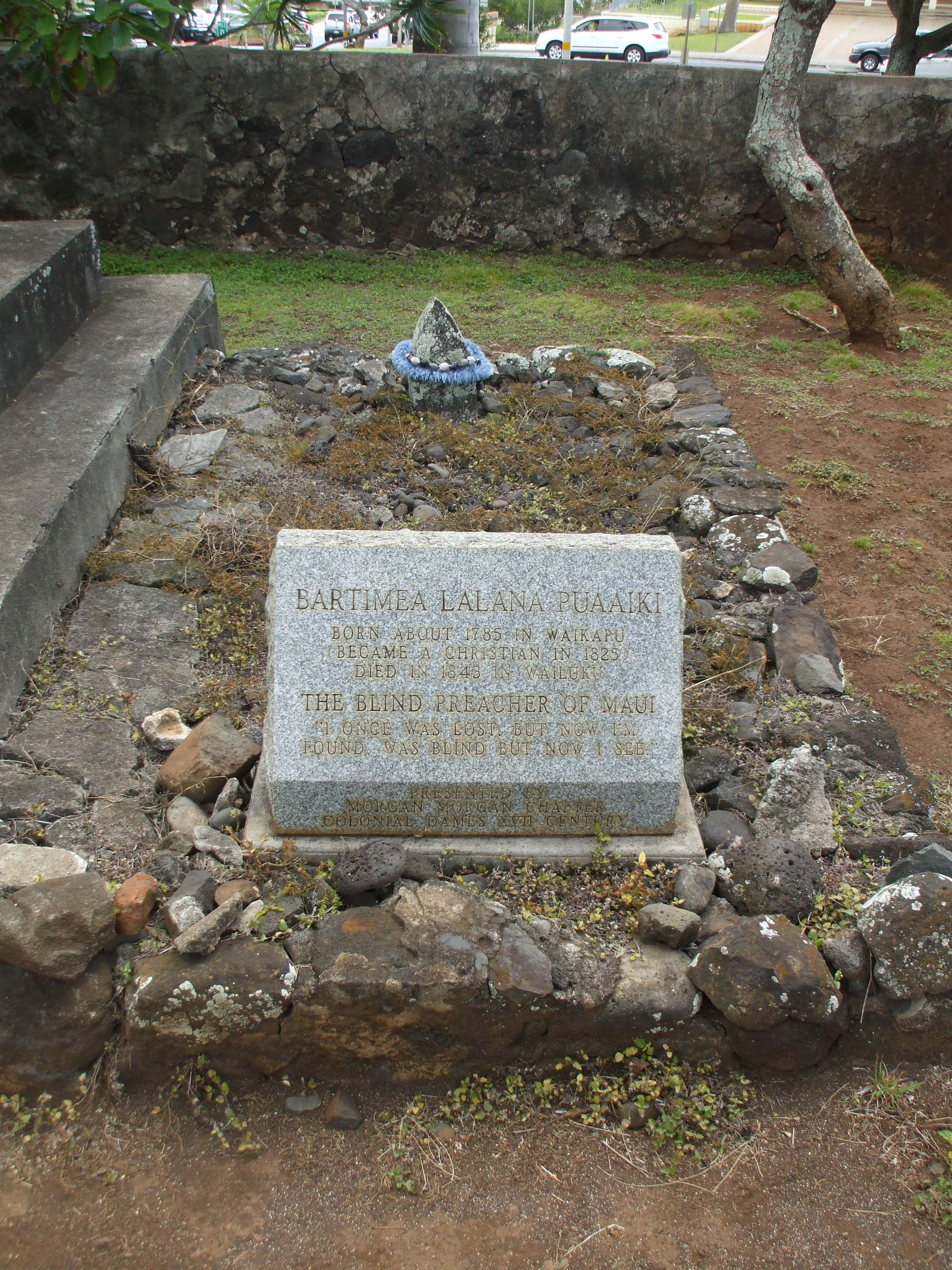
One of the graves in the graveyard

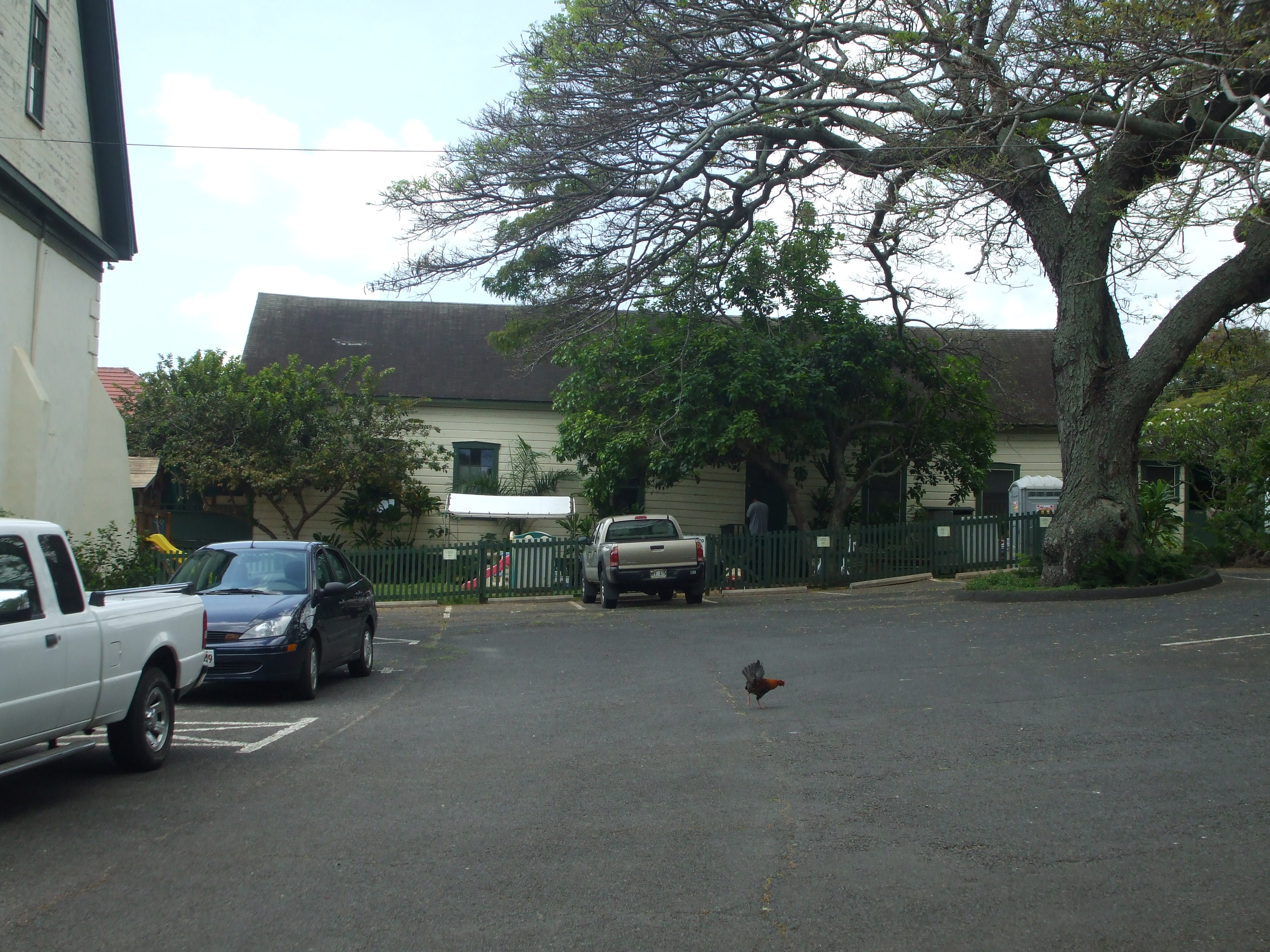
Auxiliary building behind Ka'ahumanu Church

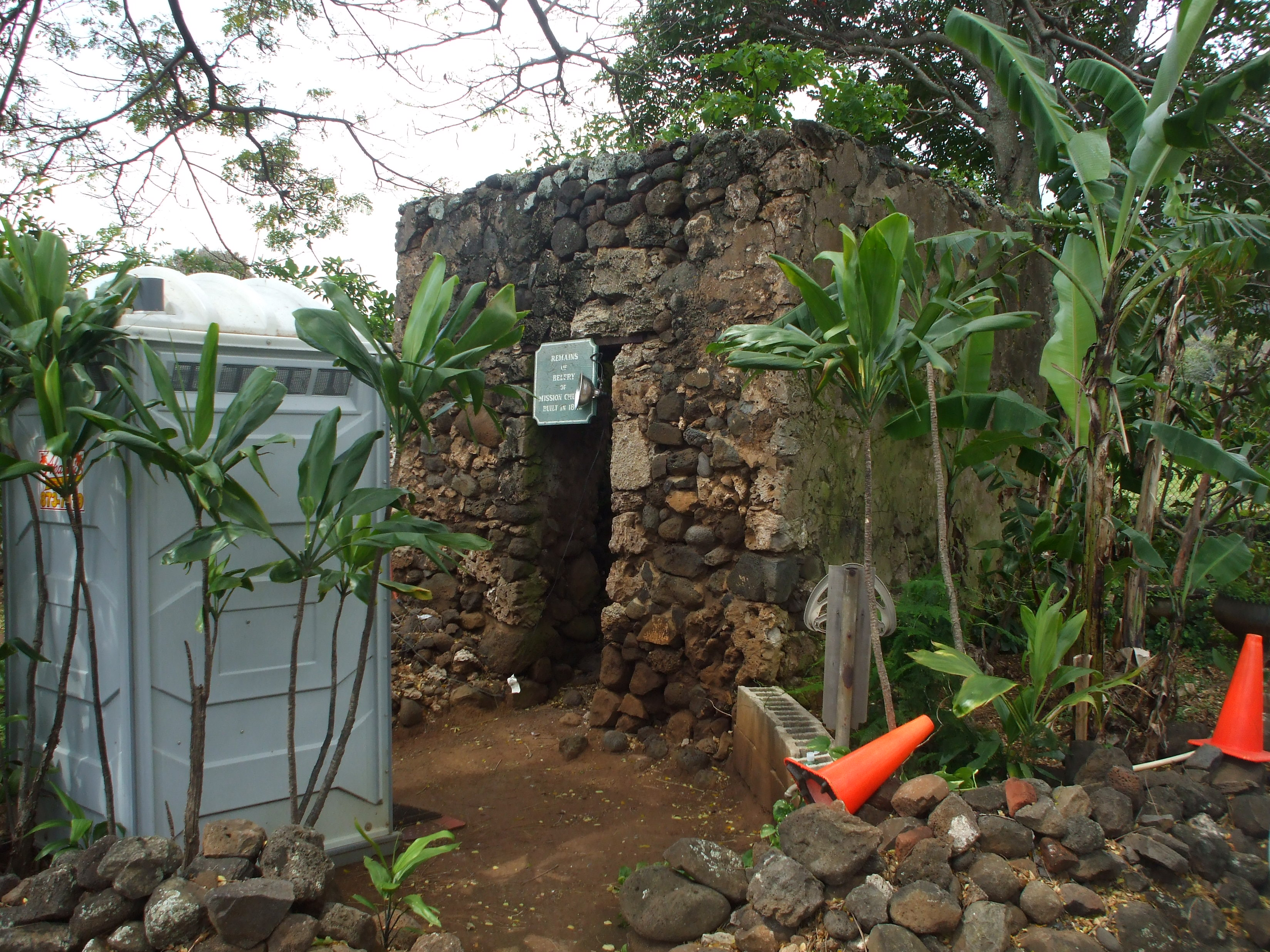
Stone structure behind Ka'ahumanu Church

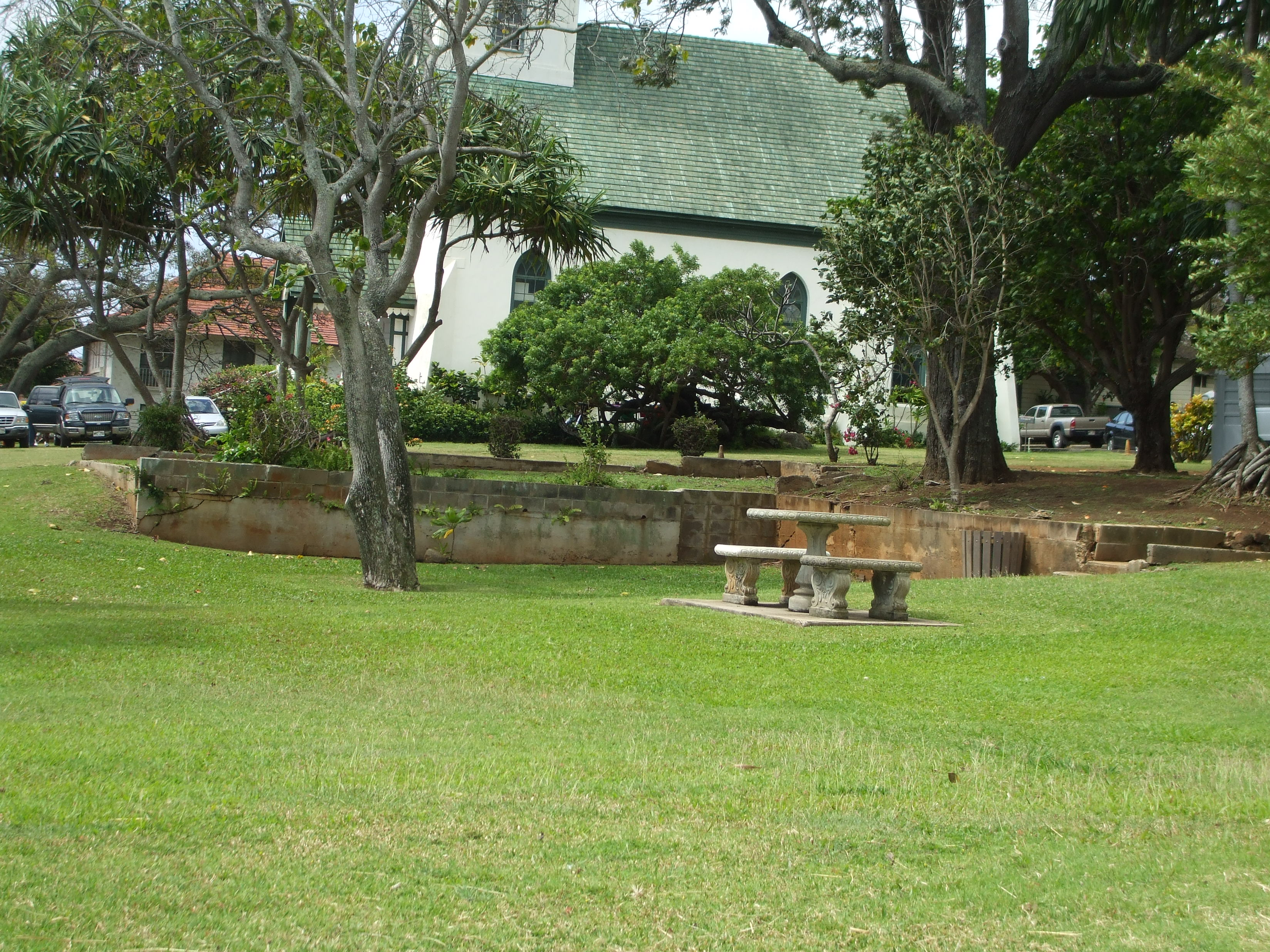
Ka'ahumanu Church grounds

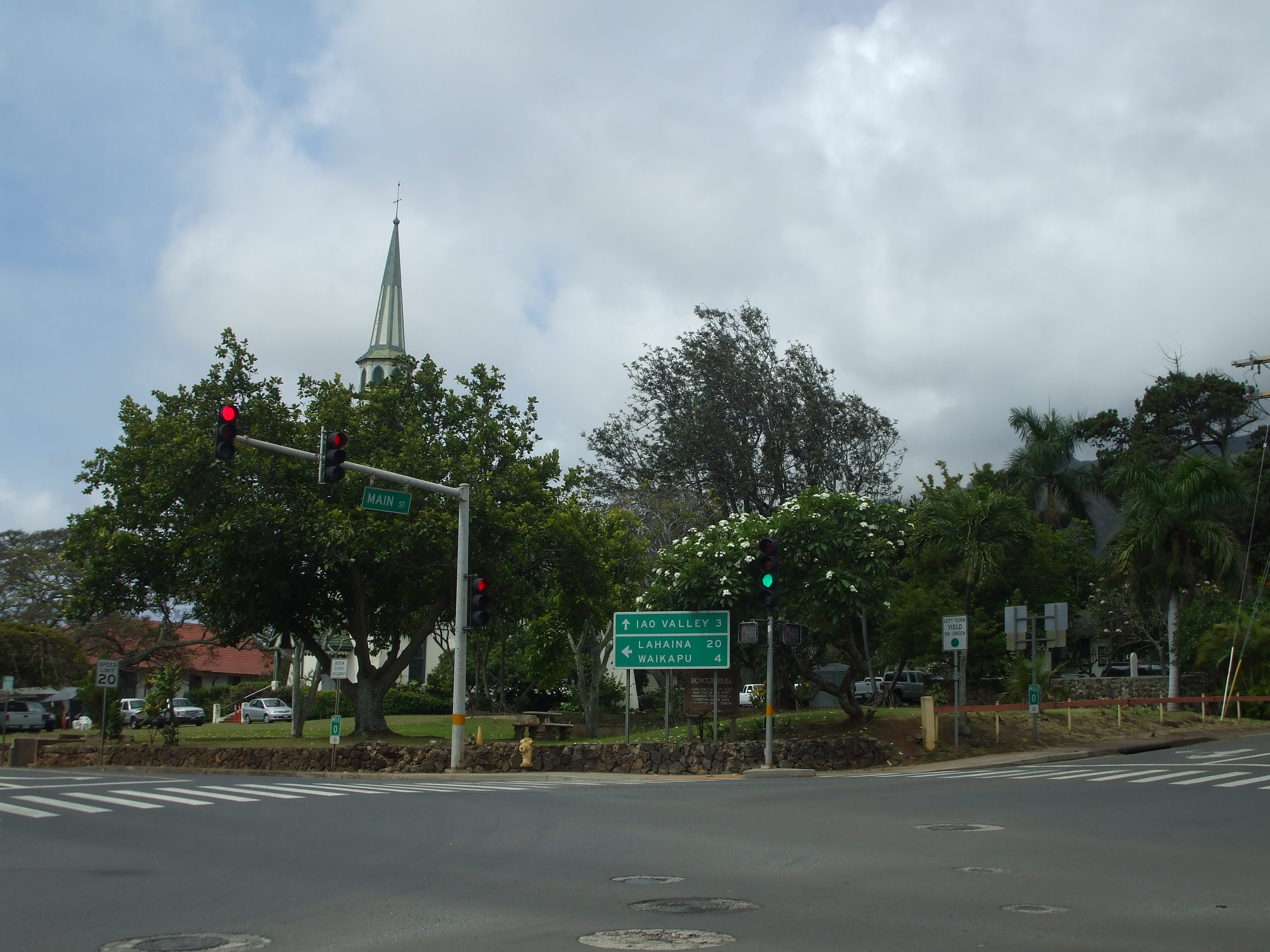
Honoli'i Park and surrounding grounds

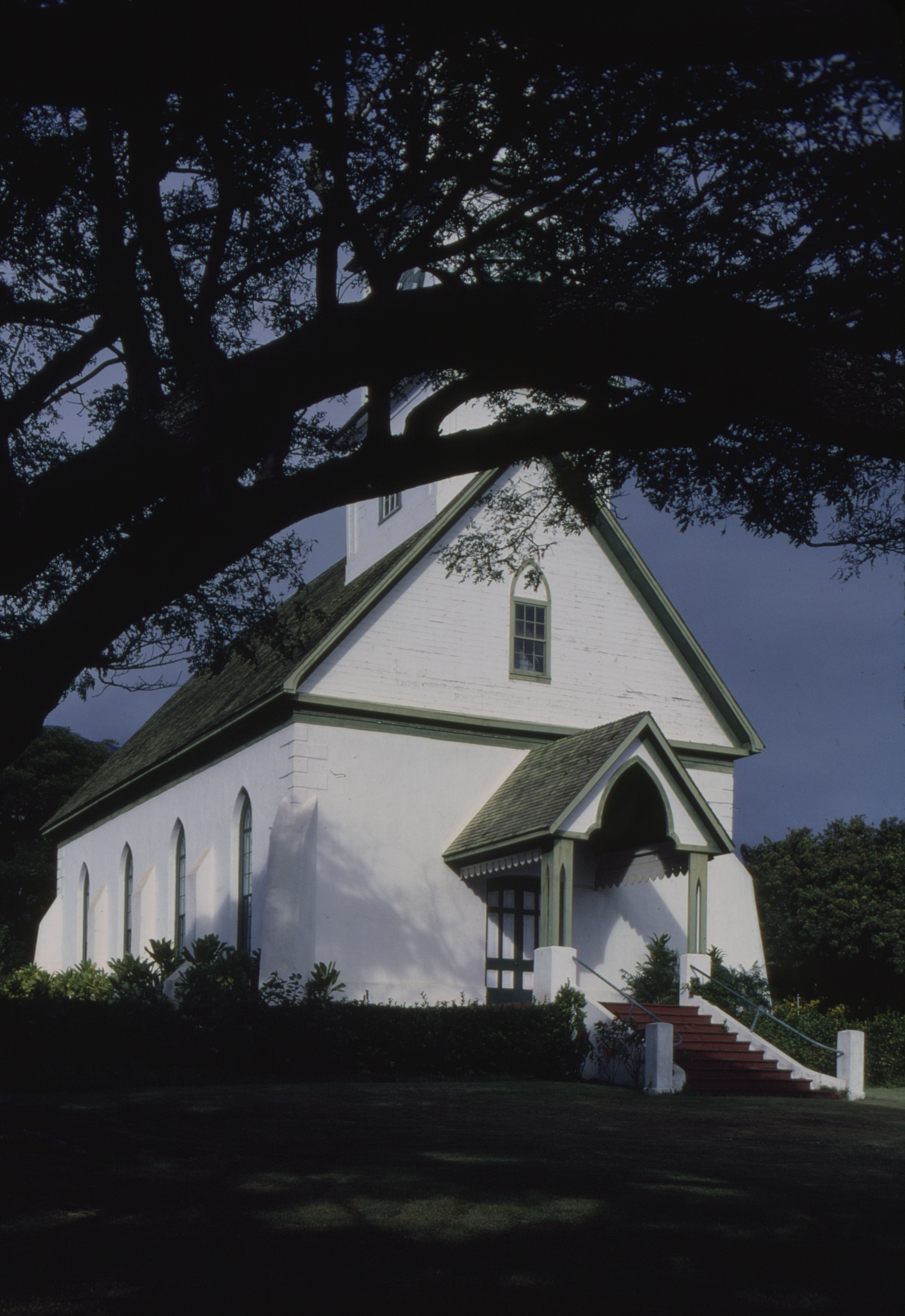
Exterior of Kaahumanu Church, c. 1990. Photograph by Alan Gowans. Department of Image Collections, National Gallery of Art Library.

== Historic listings ==
The site was placed on the National Register of Historic Places on May 12, 1975 and the Hawaii State Register of Historic Places on May 18, 1981.

== Bibliography ==
- Ecenbarger, William & Susan (2008). Glory by the Wayside: The Old Churches of Hawaii. Passage Press Inc. p. 88. ISBN 0-9776139-0-9.
- Engebretson, George (August 1, 2004). Exploring Historic Wailuku (Small Town Series Maui). Watermark Publishing. pp. 128. ISBN 1-56647-343-8.
- Ferracane, Jessica (2005). Visual Maui. Mutual Publishing. p. 124. ISBN 1-56647-725-5. Archived from the original on May 17, 2010.
- Kepler, Angela Kay (July 2007). West Maui: A Natural History Guide. Mutual Publishing. p. 165. ISBN 1-56647-823-5. Archived from the original on May 17, 2010.
- Pruitt, Blair (August 2001). Explore Maui—An Independent Traveler’s Guide. Mutual Publishing. p. 224. ISBN 1-56647-070-6. Archived from the original on April 10, 2010.
- Speakman Jr., Cummins J. (October 2001). Mowee: A History of Maui, The Magic Isle. Mutual Publishing. p. 208. ISBN 1-56647-489-2. Archived from the original on May 17, 2010.
- Pohaku: The Art & Architecture of Stonework in Hawaii. Editions Limited. 2003. p. 171. ISBN 0-915013-23-1.
