= Lefcourt Colonial Building =

Office skyscraper in Manhattan, New York

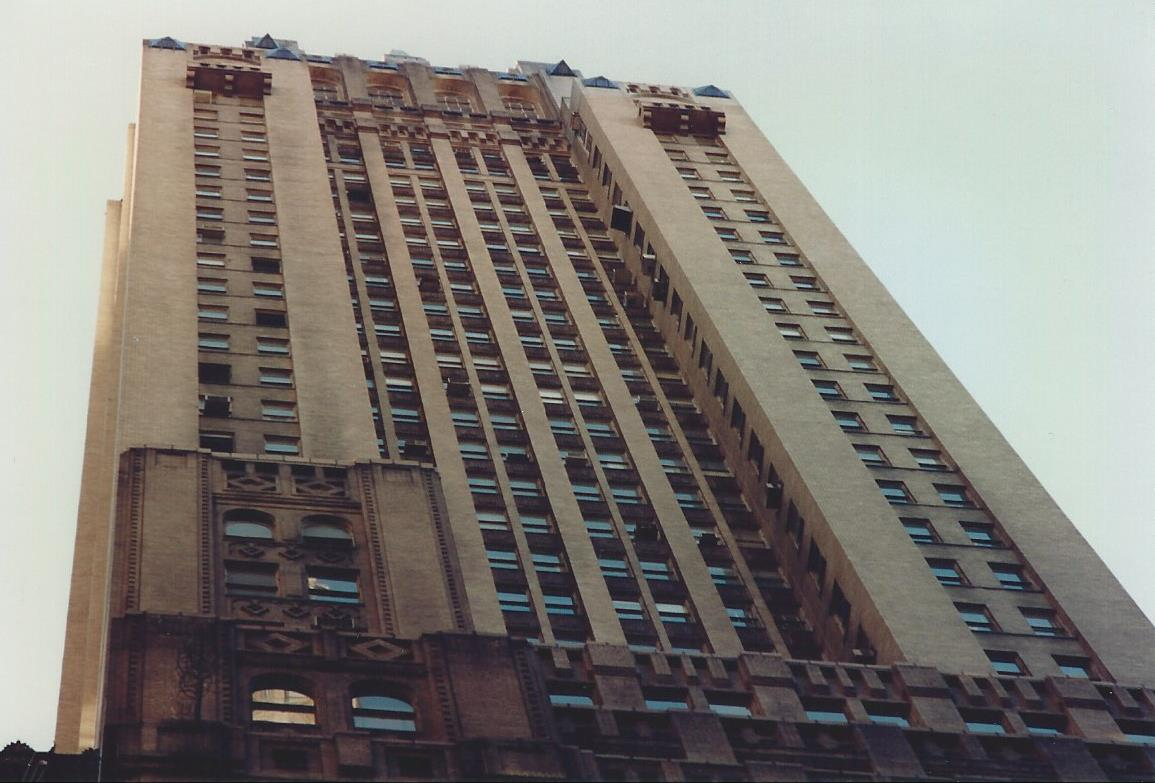

General information
- Status: Completed
- Location: 295 Madison Ave., New York, New York
- Coordinates: 40°45′06″N 73°58′45.7″W
- Construction started: 1929
- Completed: 1930

Height
- Antenna spire: 538 ft (164 m)

Technical details
- Floor count: 45

Design and construction
- Architects: Charles F. Moyer Company and Bark & Djorup

The Lefcourt Colonial Building is a 45-story office building located in Midtown Manhattan, in New York City, built by Abraham E. Lefcourt. The 538-foot-tall (164 m) neo-Gothic building, located at 295 Madison Avenue at East 41st Street, was completed in 1930.
