= 1886 in architecture =

The year 1886 in architecture involved some significant architectural events and new buildings.

== Events ==
- Patrick Manogue, Sacramento's first bishop, acquires the land to build the Cathedral of the Blessed Sacrament in the United States, designed by Bryan J. Klinch.

== Buildings and structures ==
=== Buildings opened ===
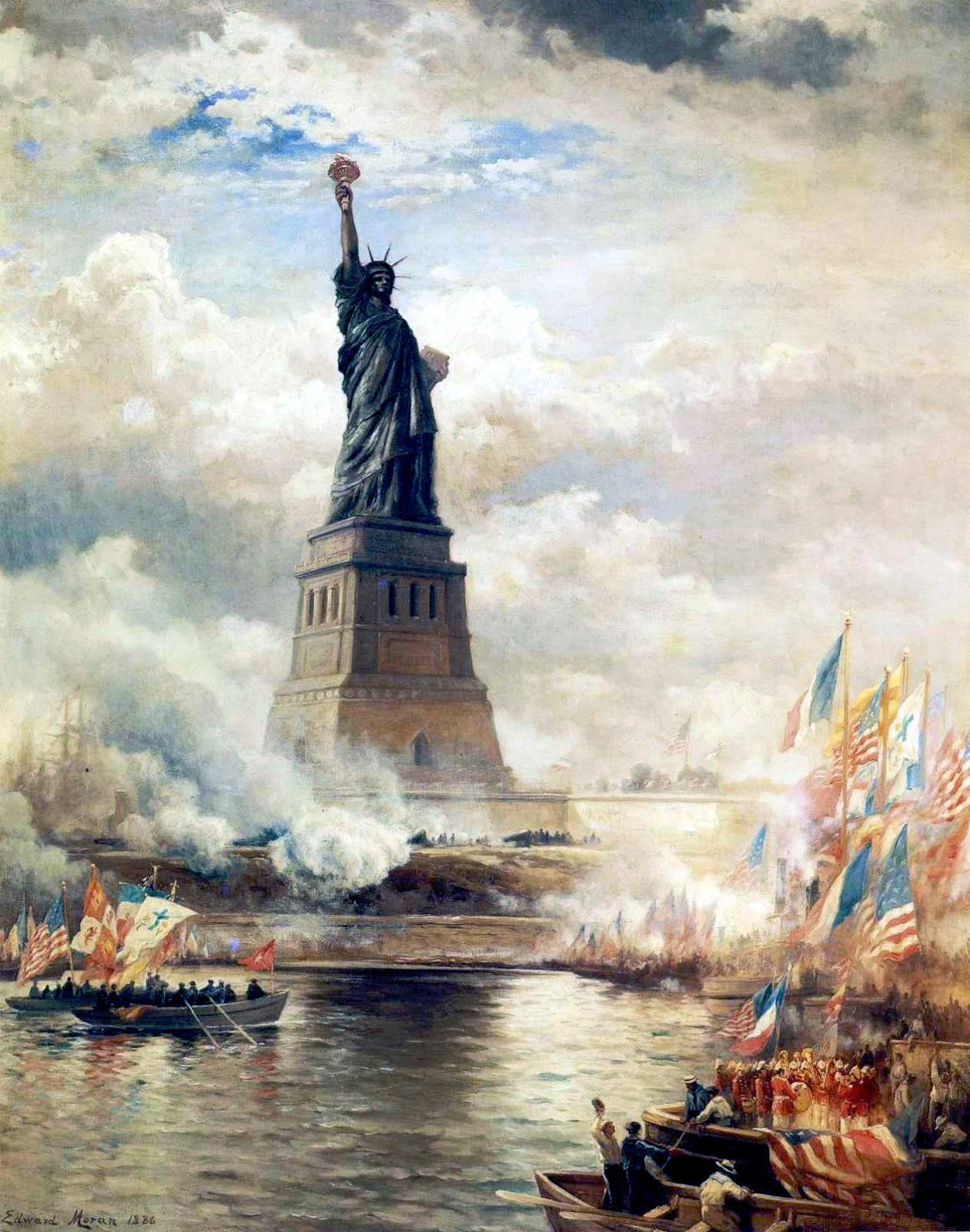
Unveiling of the Statue of Liberty Enlightening the World (1886) by Edward Moran. Oil on canvas. The J. Clarence Davies Collection, Museum of the City of New York.

- June 30 – Founder's Building at Royal Holloway College for women, Egham, near London, designed by William Henry Crossland.
- July – Neuschwanstein Castle in Bavaria, designed by Christian Jank and realized by Eduard Riedel, is opened to the public, although incomplete.
- October 28 – Statue of Liberty in New York Harbor, United States, designed by Frédéric Auguste Bartholdi with engineering by Gustave Eiffel and Maurice Koechlin.
- October 31 – Dom Luís Bridge in Porto, designed by Téophile Seyrig.

=== Buildings completed ===
- Iowa State Capitol in Des Moines, designed by John C. Cochrane and Alfred H. Piquenard
- National Assembly building in Sofia, designed by Konstantin Jovanović.
- Hotel Cecil, London, United Kingdom, designed by Perry & Reed.
- Hawick Town Hall, Scotland, designed by James Campbell Walker.
- Oulu City Hall, Finland, designed by Johan Erik Stenberg.

== Awards ==
- RIBA Royal Gold Medal – Charles Garnier.
- Grand Prix de Rome, architecture: Albert Louvet (First Prize & Second).

== Births ==
- March 24 – Robert Mallet-Stevens, French architect (died 1945)
- March 27
  - Ludwig Mies van der Rohe, German-American architect (died 1969)
  - Clemens Holzmeister, Austrian architect and stage designer (died 1983)
- June 17 – George Howe, American International Style architect and educator (died 1955)
- July 27 – Ernst May, German architect and city planner (died 1970)
- Yehuda Magidovitch, Ukrainian-born Israeli architect (died 1961)

== Deaths ==
- April 18 – Sancton Wood, English railway station architect (born 1815)
- April 27 – Henry Hobson Richardson, American architect (born 1838)
- July 17 – David Stevenson, Scottish lighthouse engineer (born 1815)
- October 6 – E. W. Godwin, English architect and designer (born 1833)
- November 4 – George Devey, English country house architect (born 1820)
