= 1815 in architecture =

The year 1815 in architecture involved some significant events.

== Events ==
- September 10–24 – The Champion (London) publishes "The Present Low State of the Arts in England and more particularly of Architecture", primarily a personal attack on John Soane written anonymously by his son George.
- The great tithe barn at Cholsey in England, the world's largest when built around 1300, is dismantled.

== Buildings and structures ==
=== Buildings ===
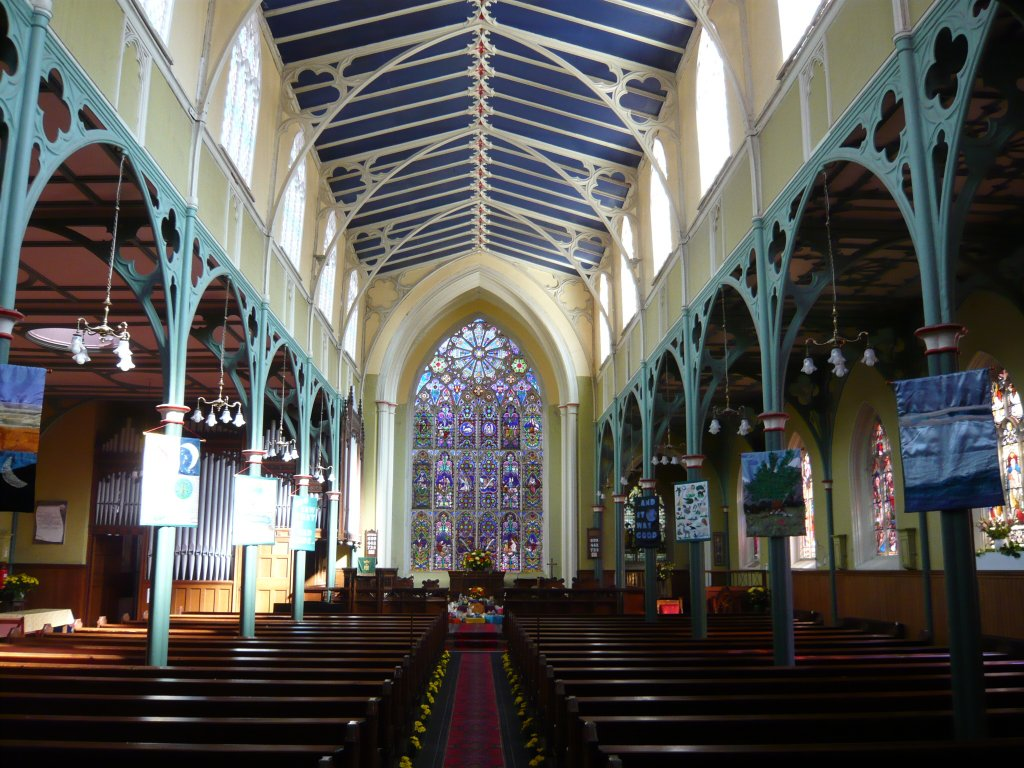
St Michael's Church, Aigburth showing cast-iron frame

- St. Patrick's Old Cathedral in New York City, designed by Joseph-François Mangin, is dedicated.
- Church of St. Paul's Radcliffeboro (Charleston, South Carolina) is completed.
- St. John's Church, Philadelphia, designed by William Strickland, is built.
- St Michael's Church, Aigburth, England, designed by ironfounder John Cragg with Thomas Rickman, is consecrated.
- Kuopio Cathedral in Finland is completed.
- Armadale Castle on Skye (Scotland) is built in the style of Scottish Baronial architecture to the design of James Gillespie Graham.
- The Nelson Monument, Edinburgh, on Calton Hill, designed by Robert Burn, is dedicated.
- Dunans and Ferness Bridges in Scotland, designed by Thomas Telford, are completed.
- Waterloo Bridge, Betws-y-Coed, Wales, designed by Thomas Telford, is constructed.
- Glenfinnan Monument in Scotland, designed by James Gillespie Graham, is erected.
- Carneal House is built at 405 East Second Street in Covington, Kentucky.
- Reconstruction of Royal Pavilion, Brighton, England, in an Indian style by John Nash begins.

== Awards ==
- Grand Prix de Rome, architecture: Pierre Anne Dedreux.

== Births ==
- January 11 – David Stevenson, Scottish lighthouse engineer (d. 1886)
- March 7 – Samuel Sloan, American architect working in Philadelphia (d. 1884)
- March 25 - William H. Folsom, American Mormon architect (d. 1901)
- October 30 – Andrew Jackson Downing, American landscape architect (d. 1852)
- December 23 – Ildefons Cerdà, Catalan Spanish urban planner (d. 1876)
- John M. Trimble, American theater architect (d. 1867)

== Deaths ==
- June 5 – Robert Burn, Scottish architect (b. 1752)
- November 15 – Louis Michel Thibault, French-born architect working in South Africa (b. 1750)
