= Bailey House Museum =

- Old Bailey House
- U.S. National Register of Historic Places
- Hawaiʻi Register of Historic Places
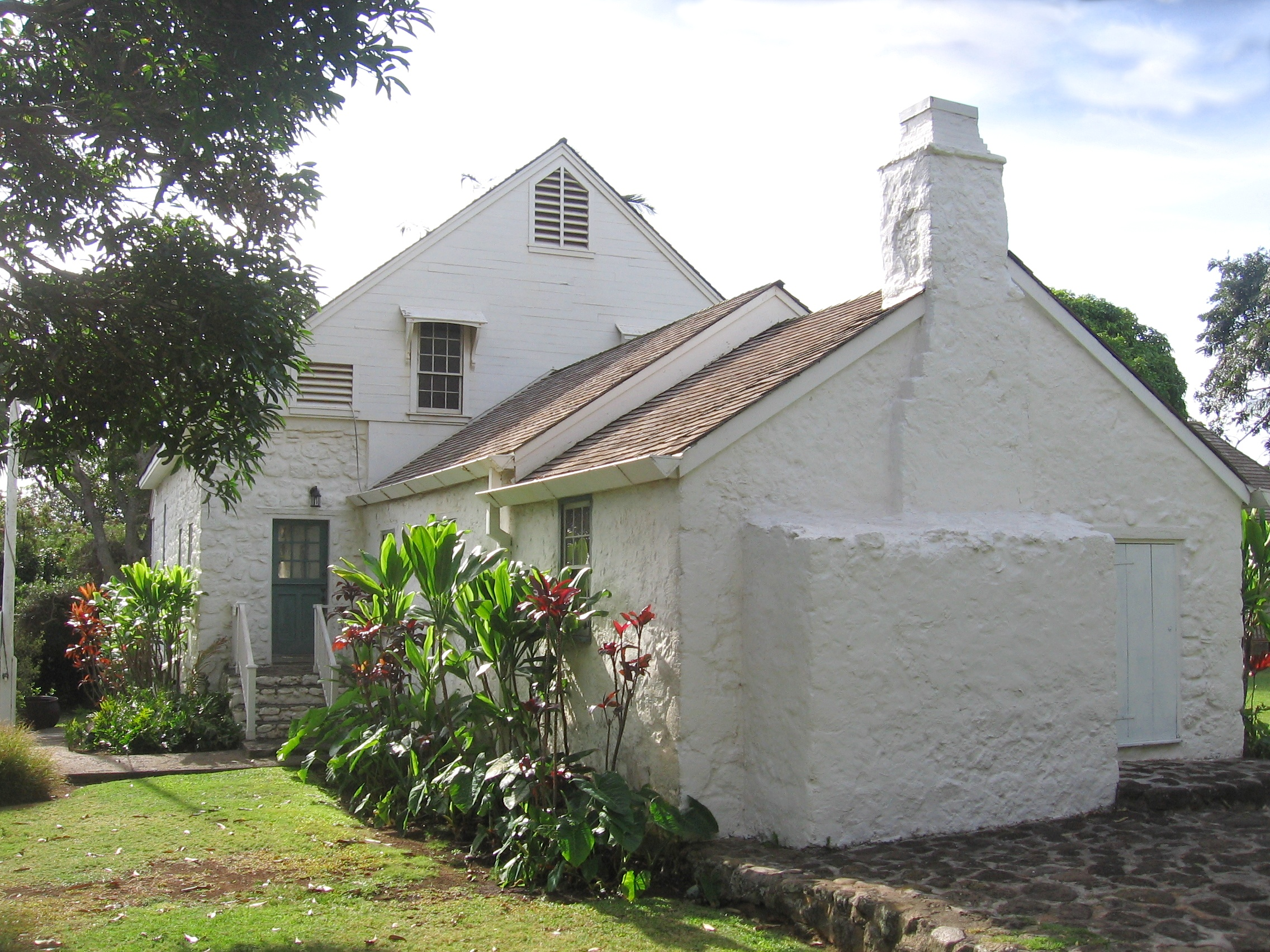

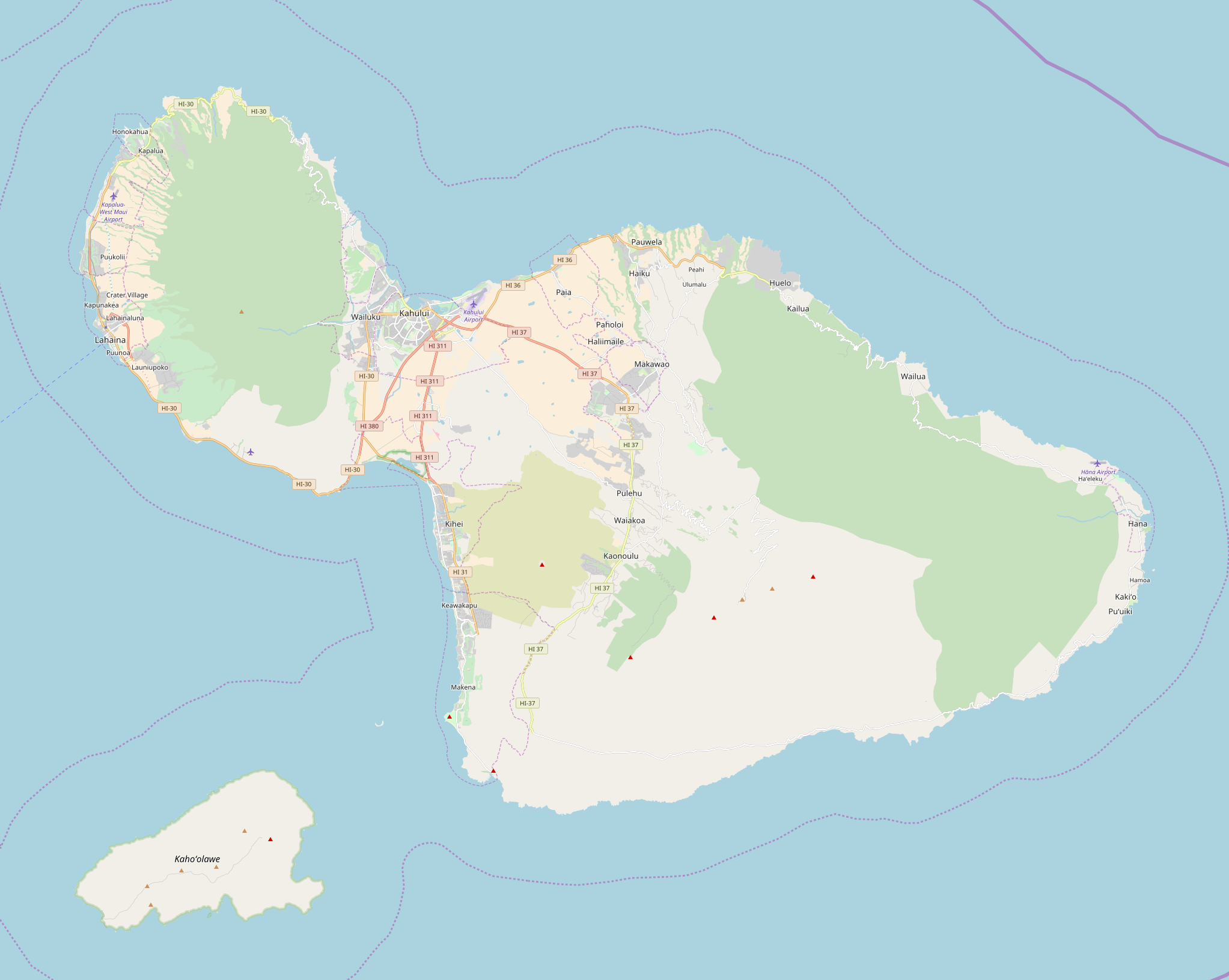
- Location within Maui Location within Hawaii
- Location: 2375 Main Street, Wailuku, Hawaii
- Coordinates: 20°53′10″N 156°30′25″W
- Area: 1 acre (0.40 ha)
- Built: 1833
- Website: www.mauimuseum.org
- NRHP reference No.: 73000678
- HRHP No.: 50-50-04-03000

Significant dates
- Added to NRHP: March 20, 1973
- Designated HRHP: May 18, 1981

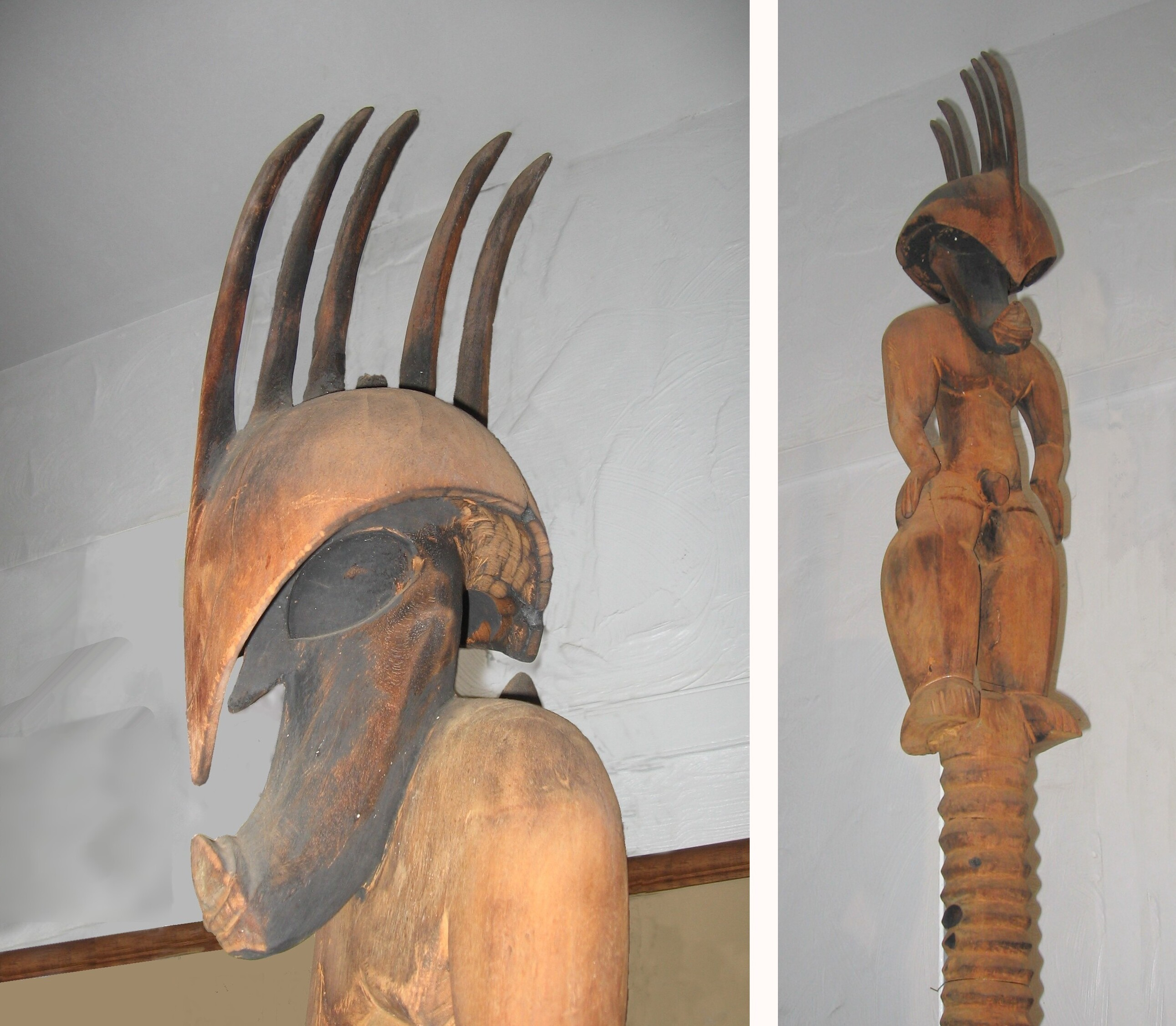
Kamapua'a statue: a wooden sculpture of the Hawaiian demi-god, created before the early 19th-century purge of the indigenous Hawaiian religion.

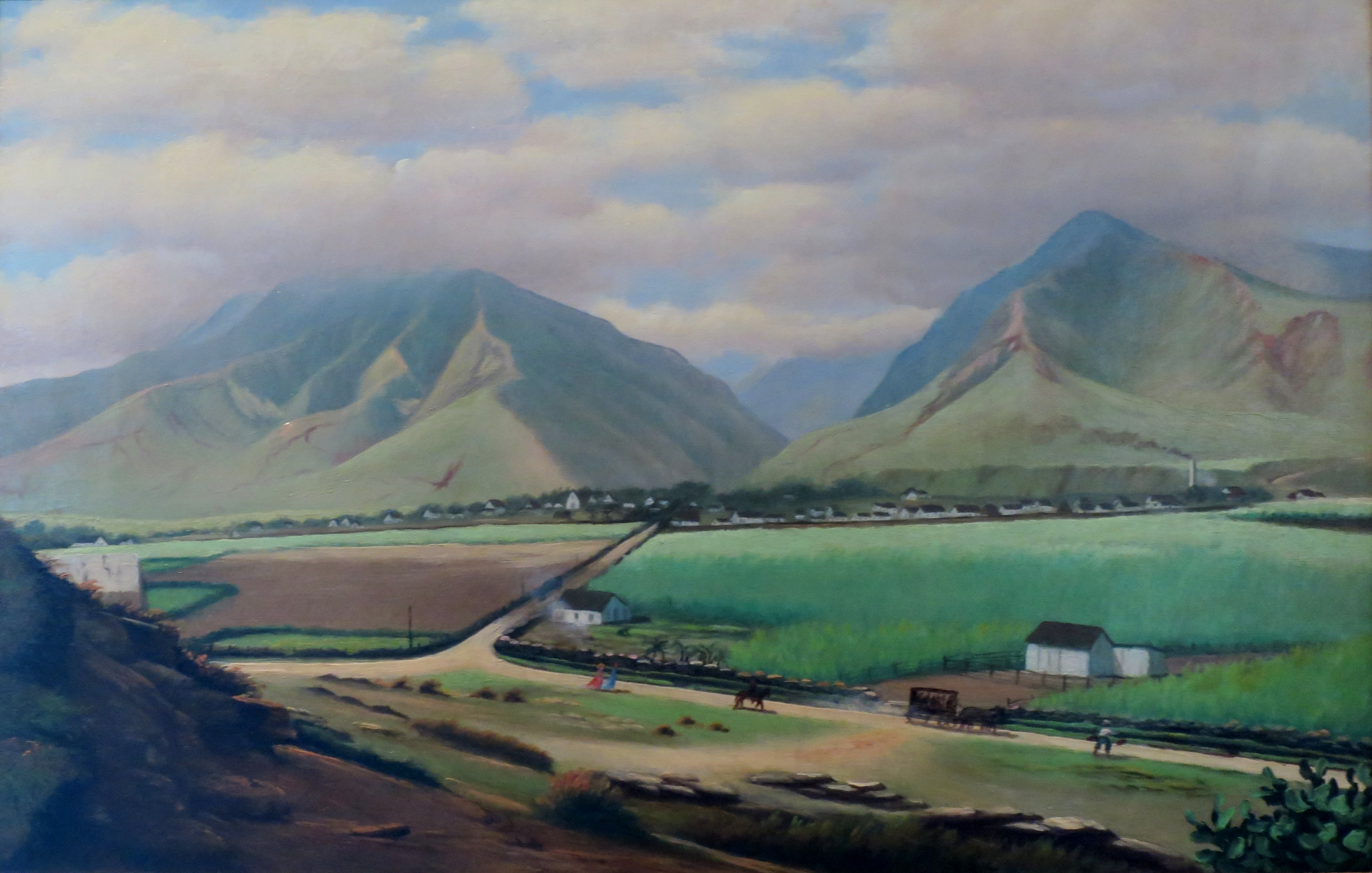
An Edward Bailey painting of Maui's central valley and Bailey House, looking west to Wailuku, and the ʻĪao Valley behind it.

Hale Hōʻikeʻike at the Bailey House (House of Display at Old Bailey House, formerly and commonly the Bailey House Museum) is a museum of Hawaiian history and art located in Wailuku, on the island of Maui, in Hawaiʻi. It is owned and operated by the Maui Historical Society. Old Bailey House is a historic district contributing property within the Wailuku Civic Center Historic District, and is on the National Register of Historic Places.

== Building and history ==
Seminary

The stone house is situated at the mouth of the ʻĪao Valley, within the former royal residence of Kahekili II (c. 1737–1794), last ruling chief of Maui. Built in 1833 and being one of the first western-style houses in Wailuku, the “Old Bailey House” is now listed in the National Register of Historic Places.

Originally intended as a mission for adults and children, in 1837 the mission was transformed into the Wailuku Female Seminary, a boarding school that not only taught its students Christianity and academic pursuits, such as the three Rs, but also domestic skills such as sewing and housekeeping. First managed by Theodosia and Rev. Jonathan Smith Green, in 1844 Caroline and Edward Bailey assumed responsibility, shortly after arriving in Hawaii.

Residence

The American Board of Commissioners for Foreign Missions, abandoned their funding of the Seminary in 1847. The school endured for several more years after 1847 educating boys and girls on a tuition paying basis. The house and land reverted to the Hawaiian crown but were purchased by the Baileys in 1850. Later, the house and the Baileys' sugarcane fields became part of the Wailuku sugarcane plantation, which then became part of C. Brewer & Co.

Museum

The Maui Historical Society was established in 1951. Hale Hoʻikeʻike (Hawaiian for "House of Display") was opened on July 6, 1957. Masaru "Pundy" Yokouchi purchased the Bailey House in 1991 and donated it to the Maui Historical Society.

== Exhibits ==
Hale Hoʻikeʻike is a history museum and contains diverse exhibits on two floors of the historic residence, and on the grounds. They include:

First floor

- Pre-European contact Hawaiʻian artifacts include utensils, tools, and weapons.
- Landscape oil paintings by Edward Bailey, the 'Sunday painter' works total over one hundred landscape paintings of 19th-century Maui .
- A wooden statue of Kamapua'a, a Hawaiʻian demi-god, created before the abrogation of native Hawaiʻian religious expression and art. Hidden in an upcountry cave for over a century, it is the only wooden statue on Maui to survive the 1819 purge of the indigenous religion by King Kamehameha II.
- A portion of the Land Snails Shell Collection, of David Dwight Baldwin. After the arrivals of introduced species of alien land snails, many of the native non-marine Mollusk species endemic to Maui have become extinct species.
- A model of the Hokulea — which is a modern-day replica of an ancient Polynesian-style sailing vessel.

Second floor

The second floor features the Monarchy Room, which displays information on the Kingdom of Hawaii and artifacts from Hawaii's monarchy era and the Koa Room which displays a large four poster bed and other furnishings made entirely from Koa. The museum also houses a significant number of historical papers available to researchers.

Grounds

A small outlying shelter displays Duke Kahanamoku's 1919 redwood surfboard. Also displayed here is the 33-foot (10 m) Honaunau, a 1900s era outrigger canoe used for fishing. The vessel was carved from a single koa log, and is one of the last koa fishing canoes made in Hawaiʻi.

The gardens of the museum grounds are designed to display native Hawaiian plants, including endangered species of Maui and the Hawaiʻian Islands. A gift shop, featuring locally made artisan items, is located on the south of the Old Bailey House. The museum and grounds are open Monday through Saturday, 10 AM to 4 PM.

== See also ==
- History of Maui
- List of single-artist museums
