= Jonathan Smith Green =

American missionary

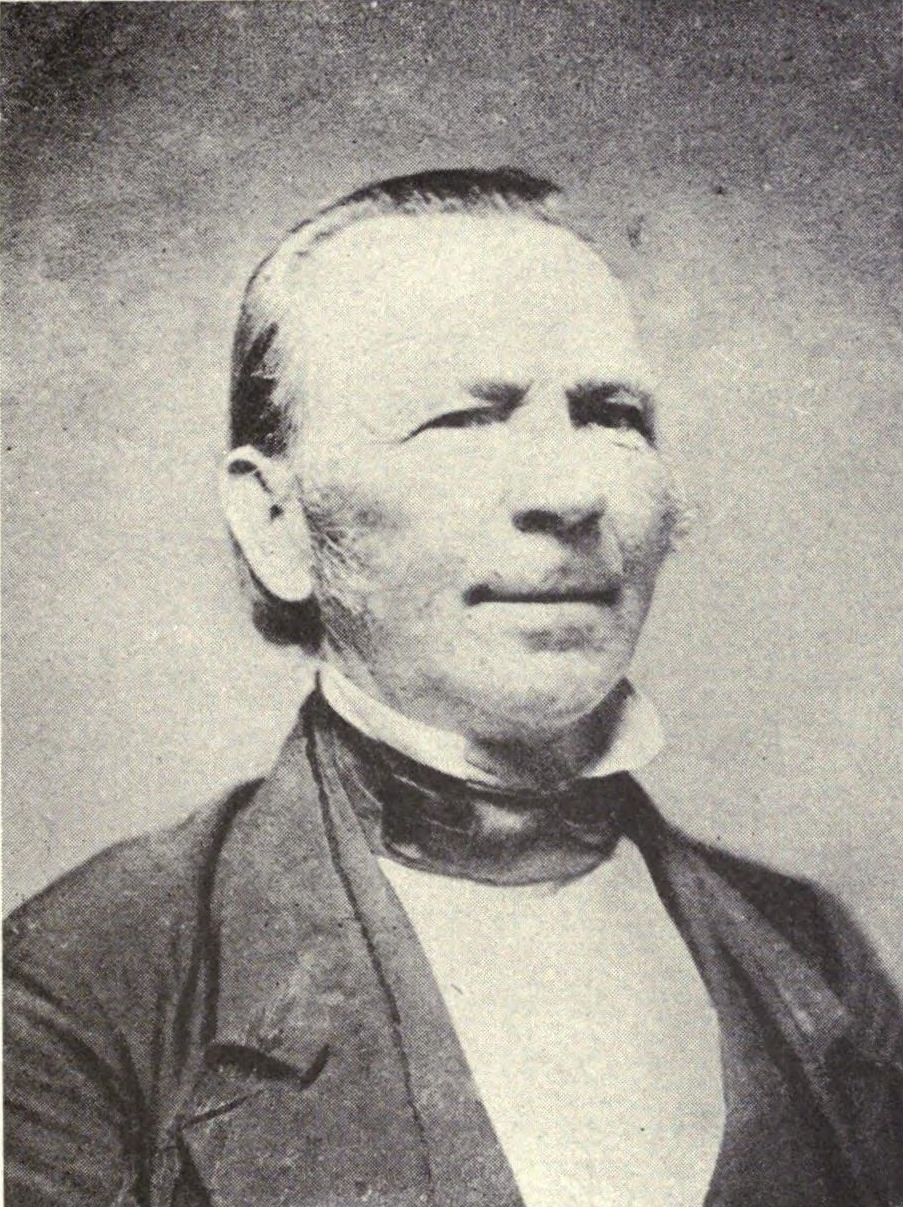
- Born: September 29, 1796; Lebanon, Connecticut
- Died: January 5, 1878 (aged 81); Makawao, Hawaii
- Occupation: Missionary
- Spouses: Theodosia Arnold; Asenath Cargill Spring
- Children: 6
- Parent(s): Beriah and Elizabeth Green

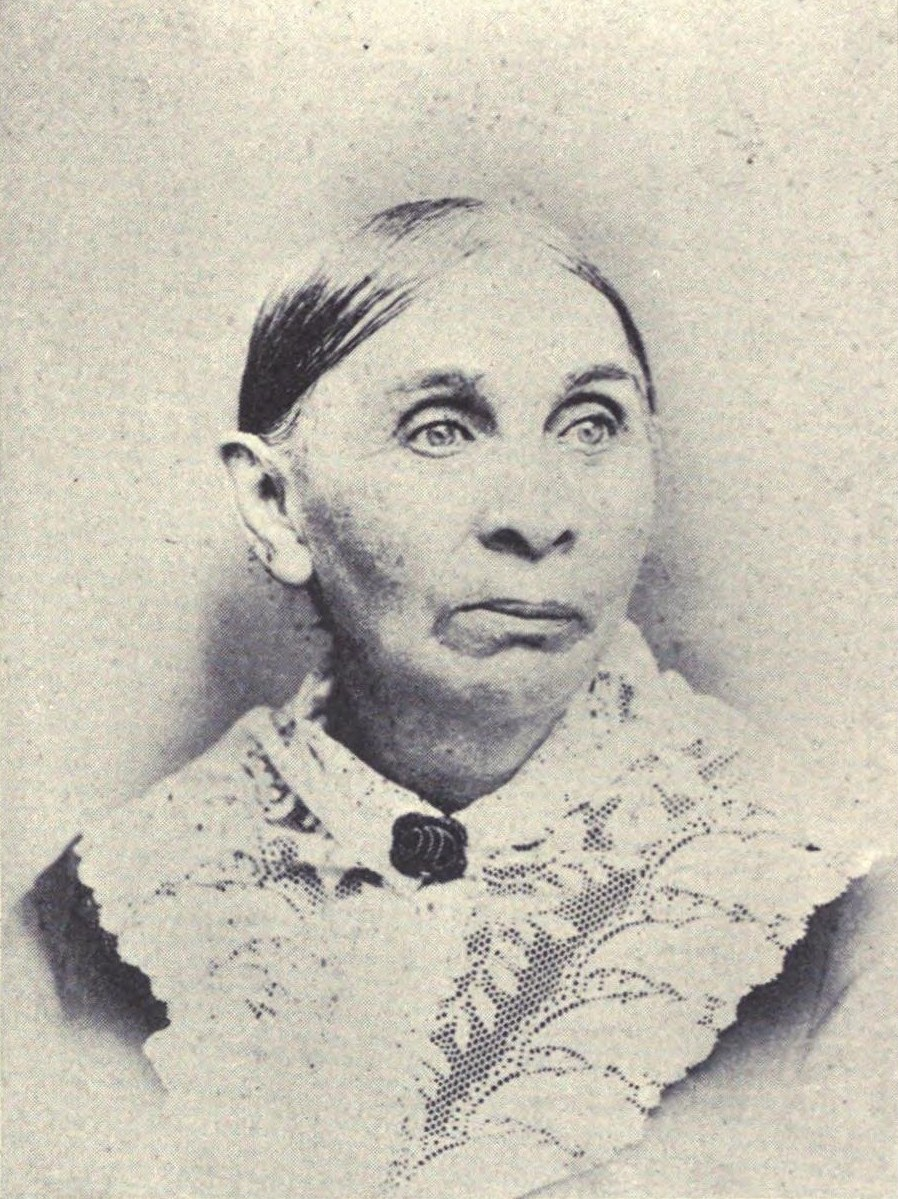
Asenath Green, circa 1875.

Jonathan Smith Green (September 29, 1796 – January 5, 1878) was a missionary from New England to the Kingdom of Hawaii.

== Life ==
Green was born December 20, 1796, in Lebanon, Connecticut, to Beriah and Elizabeth Green. Beriah Green (son of the previous) was his older brother. He graduated from Andover Seminary in September 1827 and, while waiting a specific charge, organized a Sunday school and stood for ordination in Brandon, Vermont. On September 20, 1827, he married Theodosia Arnold (1792–1859) of East Haddam, Connecticut. They traveled to Honolulu by March 30, 1828, on the Parthian, as part of the third company from the American Board of Commissioners for Foreign Missions. Other members of this company were Lorrin Andrews and Gerrit P. Judd. He left his wife an exploratory took a trip to the Pacific Northwest coast of America in 1829 for the mission. The family was assigned to Lahaina, Hawaii, on the island of Maui until 1831, then Hilo for one year. In 1833 they moved to Wailuku, Hawaii, back on Maui, and built one of the first permanent houses there. In 1836 the Greens founded a girls' boarding school called the Wailuku Female Seminary. Their house is now the Bailey House Museum.

He helped Lorrin Andrews translate the Bible into the Hawaiian language, and published the first book on the history of the Christian church in Hawaiian. He resigned from the Congregational Church in 1842 along with Andrews because he thought it should take a tougher stand against slavery. He refused to wear cotton clothing, since it was generally picked with slave labor.

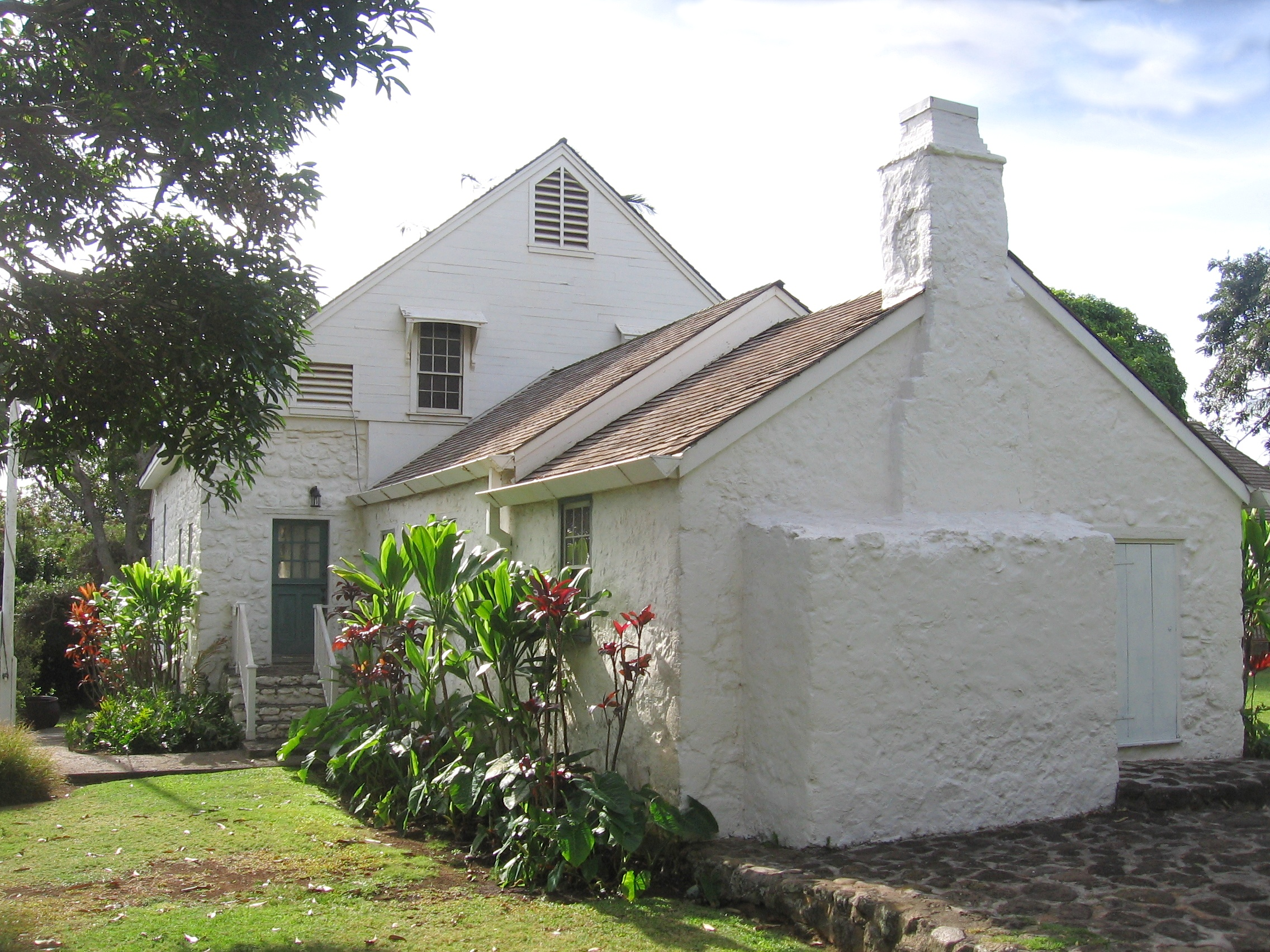
Bailey House Museum in Wailuku

In 1843 he became an independent pastor and experimented with agriculture. He was an early member of the Royal Hawaiian Agricultural Society, founding a local chapter and published reports of his progress growing wheat and other non-tropical crops at higher elevations. In 1844 he published a biography of an early convert who was known as "Blind Bartimeus", after the biblical character, born with the Hawaiian name Puaaiki. At the suggestion of local chief Kiha, he founded the independent Poʻokela Church in Makawao on land donated by King Kamehameha III, conducting services in the Hawaiian language. The expression Poʻokela means "foremost". Poʻokela Church is located at 200 Olinda Road, 20°50′59″N 156°18′32″W.

His first wife Theodosia died in 1859 after having four children. He took a trip back to the mainland, and then married Asenath Cargill Spring (1820–1894) from Providence, Rhode Island, in 1863.

Green had conducted services from about 1857 in English in his home. He founded a congregation called the "Pāʻia foreign church" because English was the foreign language of the Kingdom of Hawaii at the time, and the location was closer to the sugarcane plantation near the coastal town of Pāʻia. In April 1861 the church was commissioned by minister of the interior Prince Lot Kamehameha, who would later become King Kamehameha V. It was then called the Makawao Union Church.

In 1870, Henry Perrine Baldwin his wife, Emily Alexander Baldwin, and their children joined the church. Henry served as organist for over forty years. Baldwin and his brother-in-law became wealthy co-founders of Alexander & Baldwin. On January 5, 1878, Green died; Asenath Green would maintain the church until she died in 1894, and then daughters Mary and Laura. The family is buried at the Makawao Union Church cemetery.

His son Joseph Porter Green was born October 30, 1833, served at the church, and was elected to the legislature of the Hawaiian Kingdom in 1860. J. Porter green married Hariette Fowler Parker (1837–1912) on June 23, 1864, and their daughter Mary Theodosia Green (1865–1936), married Henry Harrison Wilcox (1868–1899) who was son of missionary Abner Wilcox (1808–1869) . J. Porter Green died June 26, 1886, in Honolulu.
