= Gustave Saacké =

French architect

- Born: August 20, 1884; Sète, France.
- Died: April 18, 1975 (aged 90); Paris, France
- Education: Beaux-Arts de Paris
- Occupation: Architect
- Awards: Olympic Games Gold Medal for Architectural Design
- Buildings: Jean Bouin stadium (1925); New Caledonian Pavilion (1931)
- Projects: "Cirque pour Toros" (1932)

Medal record

Art competitions

Representing France

Olympic Games
Gold medal – first place	1932 Los Angeles	Architectural design

Gustave Saacké (French: [ɡystav sake]; 20 August 1884 – 18 April 1975) was a French architect. In 1932 he won a gold medal in the art competitions of the Olympic Games together with Pierre Montenot and Pierre Bailly for their design of a "Cirque pour Toros" ("Circus for Bullfights").

== Works ==
=== Jean Bouin stadium (Paris, 1925) ===
Associating with Jacques Lambert and Pierre Bailly, Saacké worked on a project for a stadium in the 16th district of Paris. The stadium was of a quite modern style, enabled by the use of concrete and a light shell. The stadium underwent renovations in 1968 but was ultimately destroyed in 2010 in order to build a new rugby stadium.

=== The New Caledonian Pavilion at the 1931 Colonial Exhibition in Paris. ===
In 1930, Gustave Saacké, along with his former partner Pierre Bailly and new partner Pierre Montenot, was chosen as an architect for the New Caledonian Pavilion. They had already worked on "a study of a project to build a post office in Nouméa", New Caledonia's capital.

The architects took inspiration from vernacular Kanak architecture and especially the chief's huts. They picked characteristic features such as the pointed roof or the carved door frames. They adapted the classic hut by adding two side sections, the one on the right dedicated to the Wallis Islands and the left one for the New Hebrides.

=== Gold Medal: Cirque pour Toros, 1932 Los Angeles Olympics ===
The project Cirque pour Toros that Saacké, Bailly, and Montenot presented was unrelated to Olympic sports; it was in fact a project for a bullring, as opposed to its competitors, whose designs concerned venues for such sports.

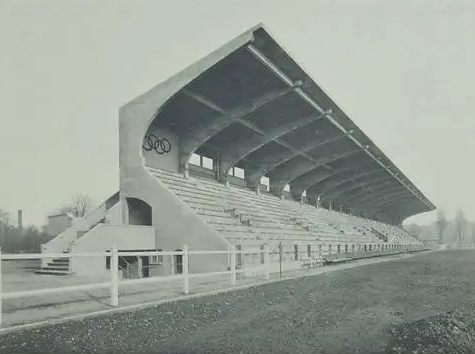
Jean Bouin stadium.

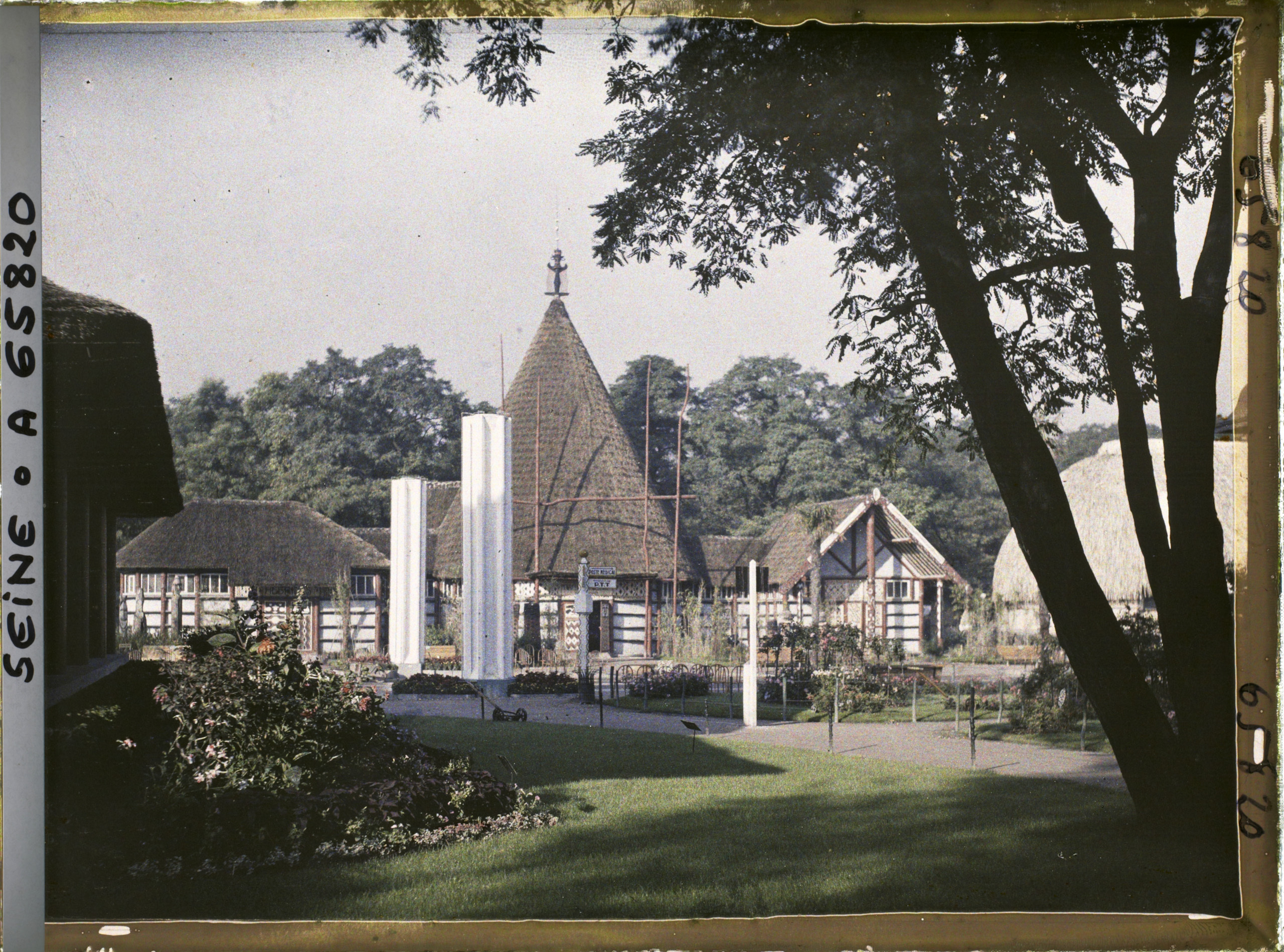
The New Caledonian Pavilion.

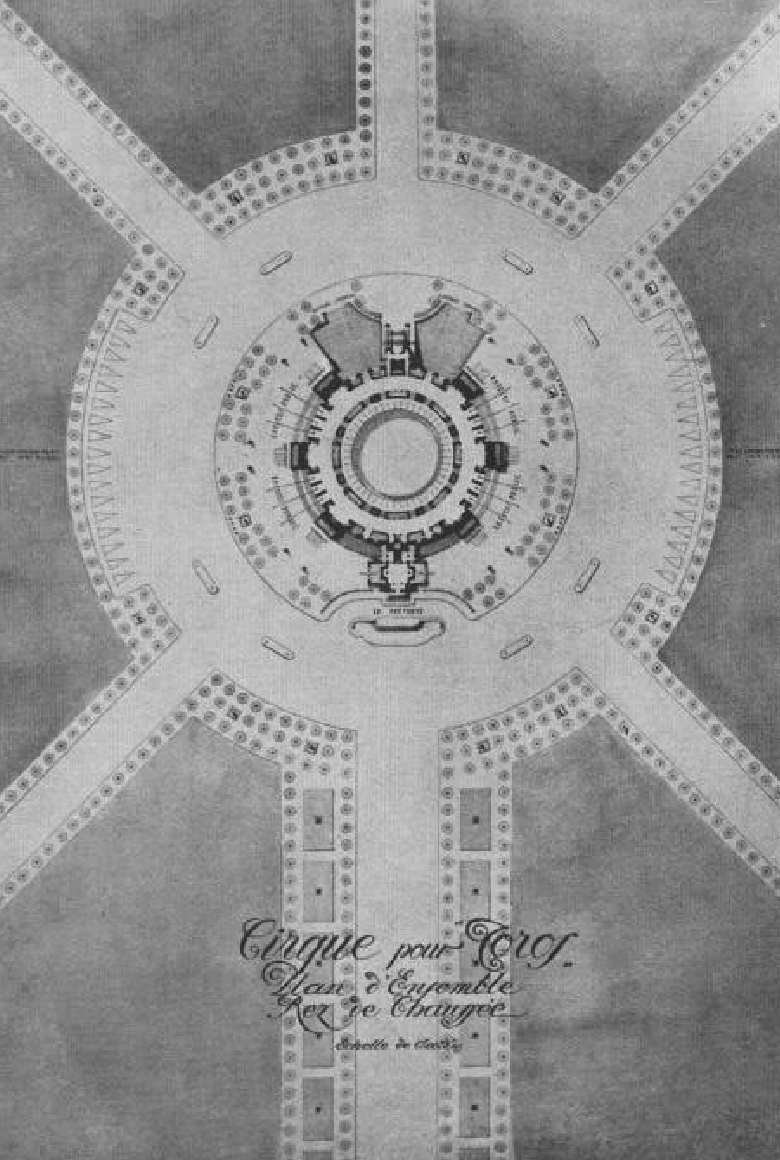
Cirque pour Toros.

== Bibliography ==
- The Games of the Xth Olympiad Los Angeles 1932 (PDF). Xth Olympiade Committee of the Games of Los Angeles, U.S.A. 1932. 1933. pp. 748–765. Archived from the original (PDF) on 2008-04-10.
- Wagner, Juergen. "Olympic Art Competition 1932". Olympic Games Museum. Archived from the original on 2008-05-01.
- Kramer, Bernhard (May 2004). "In Search of the Lost Champions of the Olympic Art Contests" (PDF). Journal of Olympic History. 12 (2): 29–34. Archived from the original (PDF) on 2008-04-10.
- Evans, Hilary; Gjerde, Arild; Heijmans, Jeroen; Mallon, Bill; et al. "Gustave Saacké". Olympics at Sports-Reference.com. Sports Reference LLC. Archived from the original on 2020-04-17.
