= Pierre Bailly =

French architect

Medal record

Art competitions

Representing France

Olympic Games
| Gold medal – first place | 1932 Los Angeles | Architectural design |

Pierre Bailly (French: [pjɛʁ baji]; March 8, 1889 – January 25, 1973) was a French architect. In 1932 he won a gold medal in the art competitions of the Summer Olympic Games together with Gustave Saacké and Pierre Montenot for their design of a "Cirque pour Toros" ("Circus for Bullfights").

== Bibliography ==
- The Games of the Xth Olympiad Los Angeles 1932 (PDF). Xth Olympiade Committee of the Games of Los Angeles, U.S.A. 1932. 1933. pp. 748–765. Archived (PDF) from the original on 2008-04-10.
- Wagner, Juergen. "Olympic Art Competition 1932". Olympic Games Museum. Archived from the original on 2008-05-01.
- Kramer, Bernhard (May 2004). "In Search of the Lost Champions of the Olympic Art Contests" (PDF). Journal of Olympic History. 12 (2): 29–34. Archived (PDF) from the original on 2008-04-10.
- Evans, Hilary; Gjerde, Arild; Heijmans, Jeroen; Mallon, Bill; et al. "Pierre Bailly". Olympics at Sports-Reference.com. Sports Reference LLC. Archived from the original on 2020-04-17.
