= Edward Bailey =

American painter

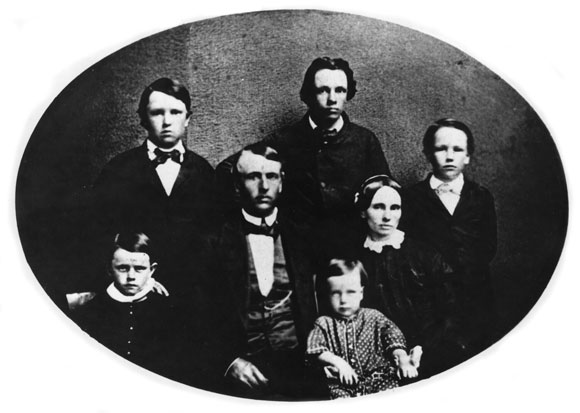
Edward Bailey and family, 1854.

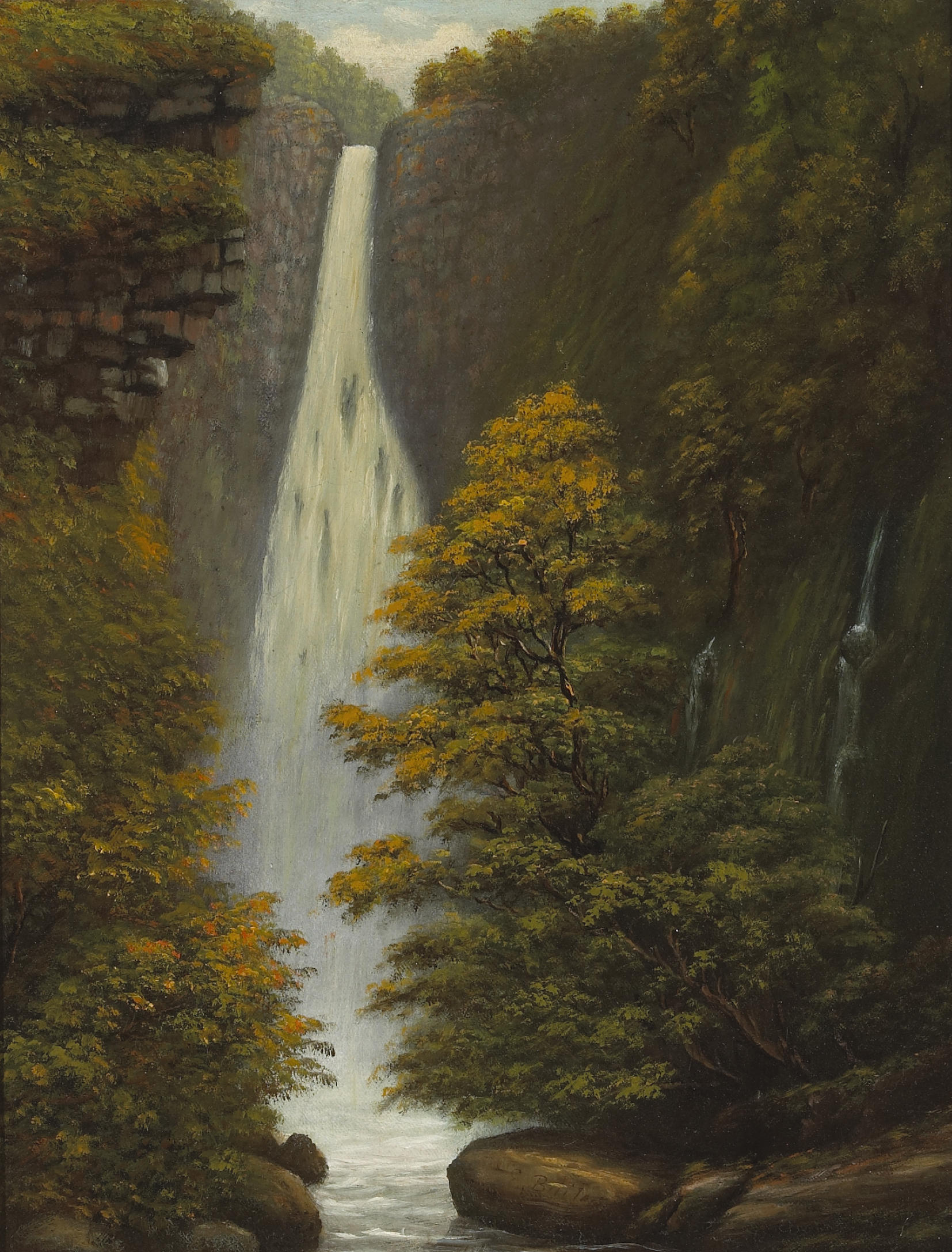
Falls of Hanapepe, Kauai, oil on canvas painting by Edward Bailey, 1887

Edward Bailey (1814–1903) was the most accomplished of the Hawaiian missionary period artists in Hawaii. He was born in Massachusetts, moved to Hawaii in 1836, and retired to California in 1885.

== Career ==
Along with his wife Caroline Hubbard, Bailey arrived in Hawaii as a missionary-teacher in 1837 on the ship Mary Frazier. He worked at the Wailuku Female Seminary in Maui from 1840 until its closure in 1849. After the seminary closed, he helped build the still standing Ka'ahumanu Church in Wailuku and operated a small sugarcane plantation that eventually became part of the Wailuku Sugar Company.

Bailey's early works were sketches and drawings which were engraved by students at the Lahainaluna Seminary between 1833 and 1843. He began painting about 1865, at the age of 51, without any formal instruction.

Bailey's best known paintings are landscapes depicting the natural beauty of central Maui. The Bailey House Museum (Wailuku, Hawaii) and the Lyman House Memorial Museum (Hilo, Hawaii) are among the public collections holding works by Edward Bailey.
