= Pierre Montenot =

French architect

Medal record

Art competitions

Representing France

Olympic Games
Gold medal – first place	1932 Los Angeles	Architectural design

Pierre Montenot (French: [pjɛʁ mɔ̃teno]; November 1, 1884 – June 6, 1953) was a French 20th-century architect. In 1932 he won a gold medal in the art competitions of the Olympic Games together with Gustave Saacké and Pierre Bailly for their design of a "Cirque pour Toros" ("Circus for Bullfights").

== Bibliography ==
- The Games of the Xth Olympiad Los Angeles 1932 (PDF). Xth Olympiade Committee of the Games of Los Angeles, U.S.A. 1932. 1933. pp. 748–765. Archived (PDF) from the original on 2008-04-10.
- Wagner, Juergen. "Olympic Art Competition 1932". Olympic Games Museum. Archived from the original on 2008-05-01.
- Kramer, Bernhard (May 2004). "In Search of the Lost Champions of the Olympic Art Contests" (PDF). Journal of Olympic History. 12 (2): 29–34. Archived (PDF) from the original on 2008-04-10.
