= 1967 in architecture =

The year 1967 in architecture involved some significant architectural events and new buildings.

== Events ==
- May 25 – The Roman Curia's Sacred Congregation of Rites issues the instruction Eucharisticum Mysterium which permits celebration of Mass facing the congregation in Catholic churches, with implication for their internal layout.
- September – Demolition of Singer Building in New York City begins.
- November 7 – St Pancras railway station in London is made a Grade I listed building, regarded as a landmark in the appreciation of Victorian architecture in Britain.
- The first Conservation area (United Kingdom) is designated, in Stamford, Lincolnshire.
- Slovak Radio Building in Bratislava is begun; it will not be completed until 1983.

== Buildings and structures ==
=== Buildings opened ===
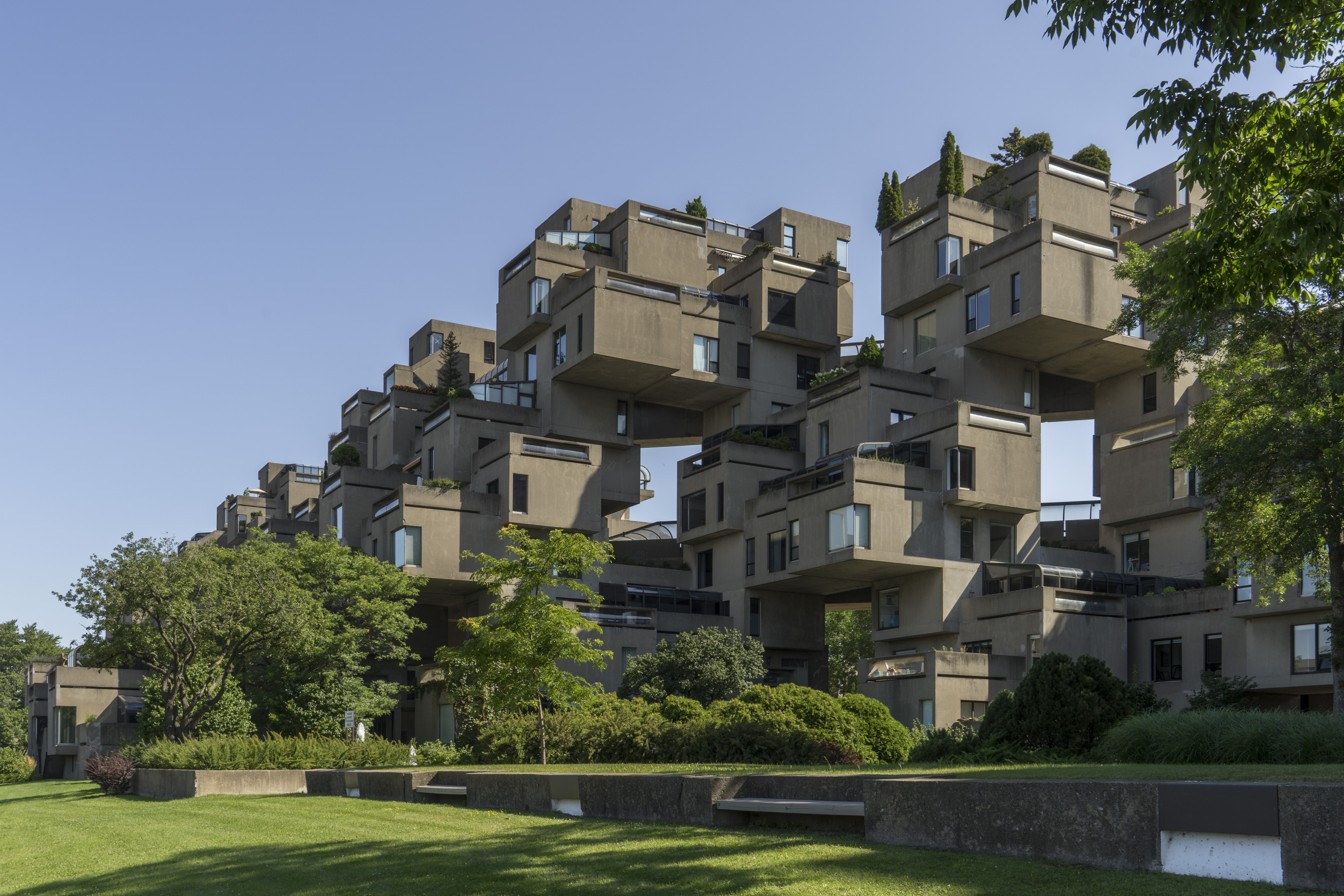
Habitat 67 in Montreal, Canada

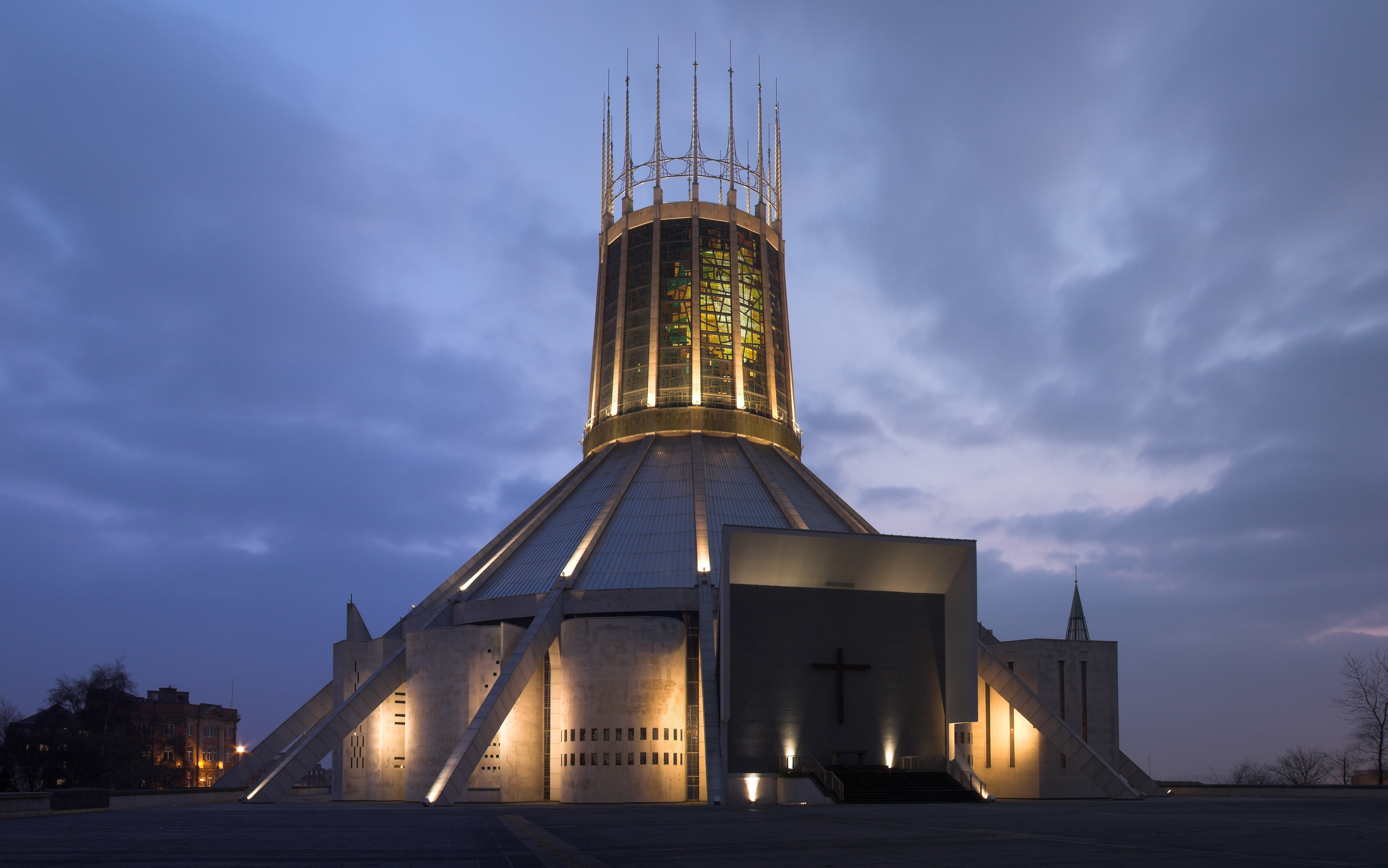
Liverpool Metropolitan Cathedral

- February 7 – Mortonhall Crematorium, Edinburgh, Scotland, designed by Spence, Glover & Ferguson (project architect: John 'Archie' Dewar), is dedicated.
- March 1 – Queen Elizabeth Hall concert venue on the South Bank in London, England, designed by Hubert Bennett, head of the architects department of the Greater London Council, with Jack Whittle, F. G West and Geoffrey Horsefall, structural engineering by Ove Arup & Partners and construction by Higgs and Hill.
- April – Habitat 67 in Montreal, Quebec, Canada designed by Moshe Safdie as part of Expo 67.
- May 14 – Liverpool Metropolitan Cathedral, England, designed by Frederick Gibberd, is consecrated.
- August 20 – San Diego Stadium, San Diego, California, designed by Frank Hope and Associates.
- September 3 – Essingebron, Stockholm, Sweden.
- September 4 – Ponte Morandi, Genoa, Italy, designed by Riccardo Morandi.
- December 8 – Ford Foundation Center for Social Justice, Midtown Manhattan, New York City, designed by architect Kevin Roche and engineering partner John Dinkeloo of Roche-Dinkeloo.
- The Fashion Island shopping mall in Newport Beach, California, designed by William Pereira and Welton Becket.

=== Buildings completed ===
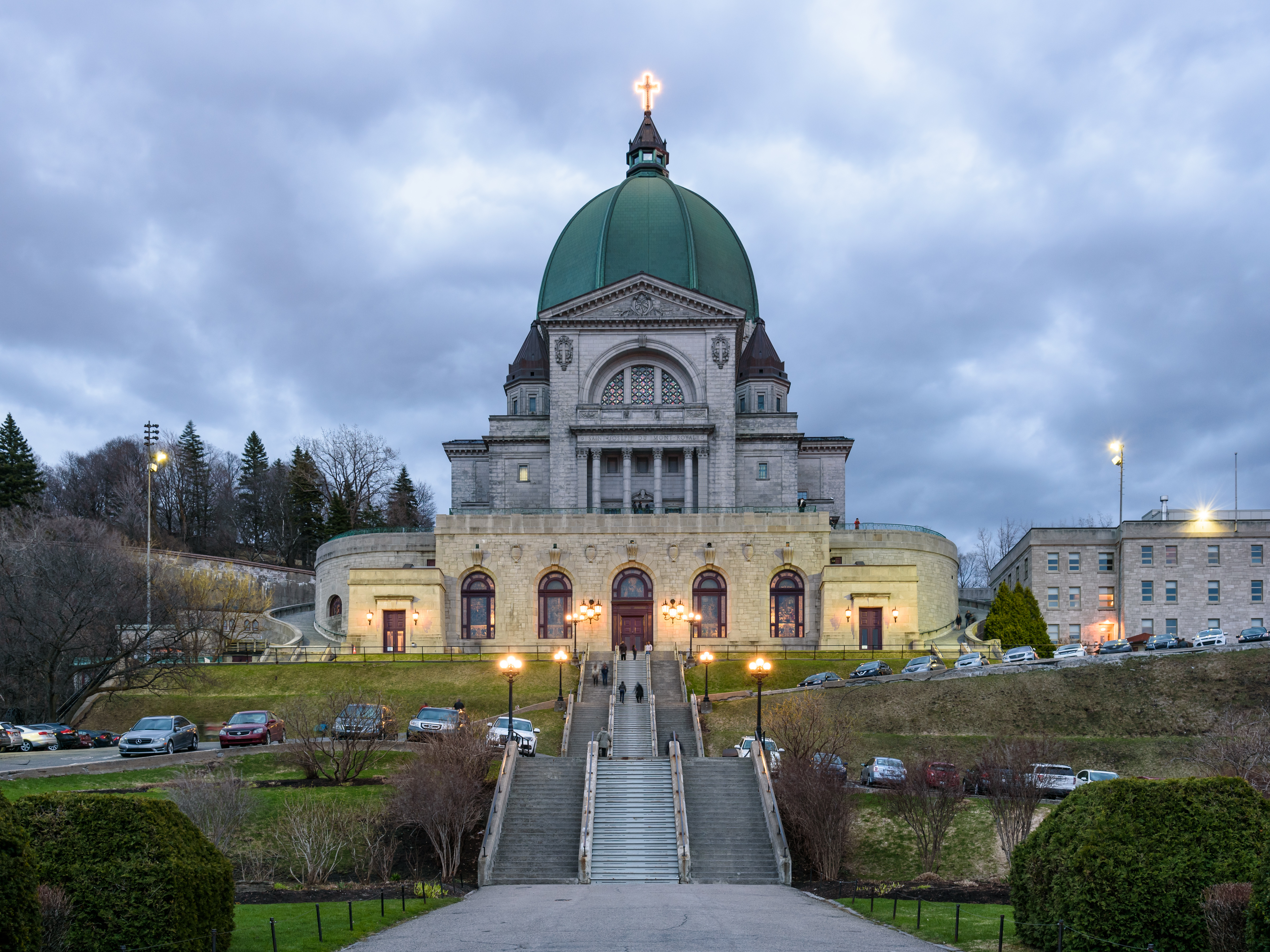
Saint Joseph's Oratory in Montreal, Canada

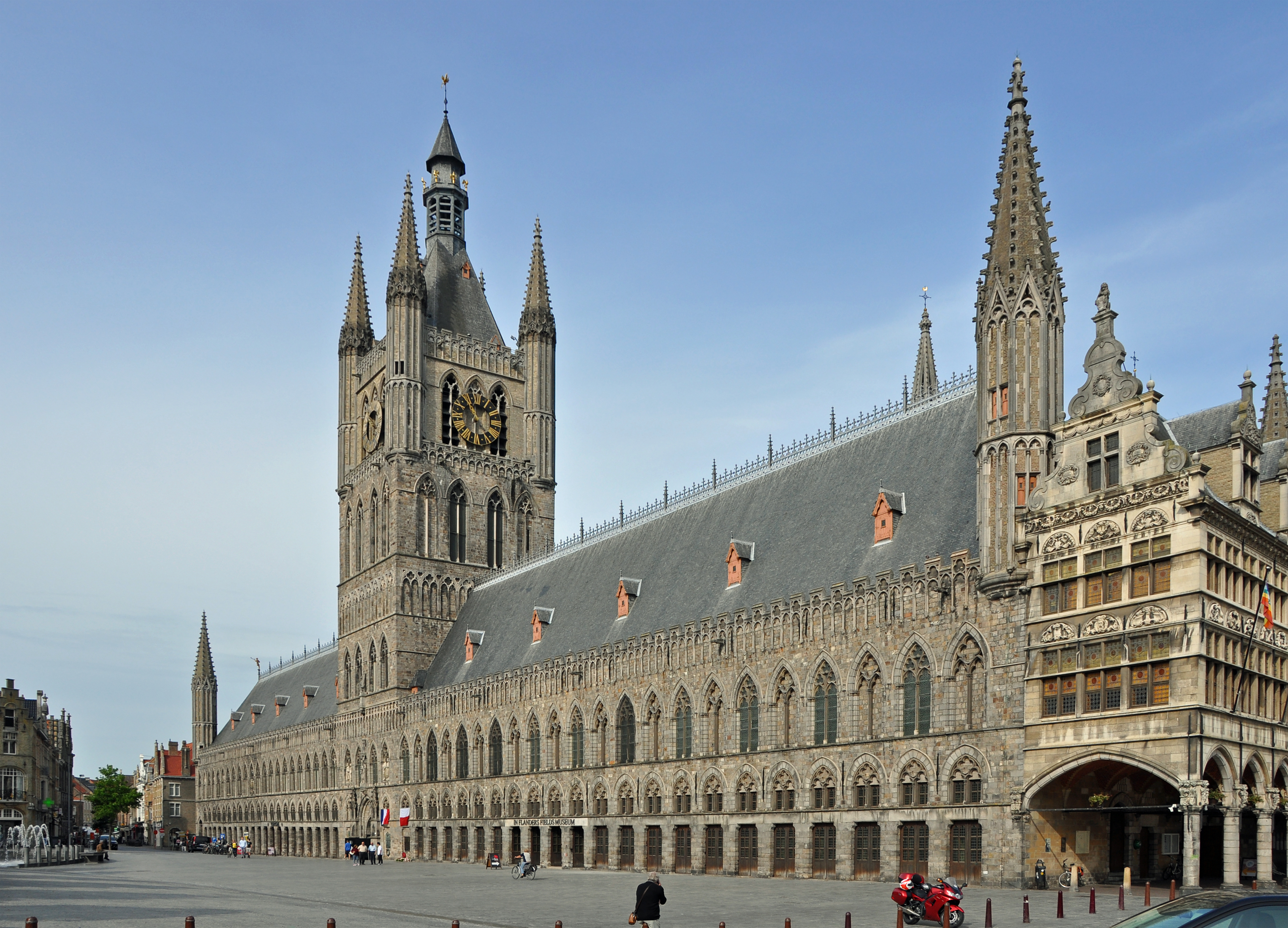
Ypres Cloth Hall in Ypres, Belgium

- December – Tour du Midi, Brussels, Belgium.
- Avord Tower, Regina, Saskatchewan, Canada
- El Menzah Sports Palace, Tunis, Tunisia.
- Ostankino Tower, Moscow, Russia; it will remain the tallest freestanding structure in the world until the completion of the CN Tower.
- Saint Joseph's Oratory in Montreal, Quebec, Canada.
- Our Lady Help of Christians Church, Tile Cross, Birmingham, England, designed by Richard Gilbert Scott.
- Blessed Sacrament Church, Gorseinon, Wales, designed by Robert Robinson.
- Church of St Mary the Immaculate Conception, Failsworth, England, designed by Tadeusz Lesisz of Greenhalgh & Williams.
- The Kaknästornet TV Tower in Stockholm, Sweden.
- Berkeley Library, Trinity College Dublin, Ireland, designed by Ahrends, Burton and Koralek.
- Australia Square in Sydney, Australia.
- The Marine Midland Bank Building in Manhattan, New York, United States.
- The South Coast Plaza shopping mall in Costa Mesa, California, designed by Victor Gruen, is opened.
- Reliance Controls factory, Swindon, the last design by Team 4 (Su and Richard Rogers and Wendy and Norman Foster), considered the first example of High-tech architecture in the United Kingdom, is opened (demolished 1991).
- First stage of Cumbernauld Town Centre, the main shopping centre for the New town of Cumbernauld, Scotland, widely accepted as the United Kingdom's first shopping mall and the world's first multi-level covered town centre (partly demolished 2001).
- The first part of the Toronto-Dominion Bank Tower in Toronto, Ontario, Canada, designed by Mies van der Rohe; it becomes the tallest building in the British Commonwealth (1967–1972).
- Ypres Cloth Hall, reconstructed to its pre-World War I condition under the guidance of architects J. Coomans and P.A. Pauwels.

== Awards ==
- AIA Gold Medal – Wallace Kirkman Harrison
- Alvar Aalto Medal – Alvar Aalto
- Architecture Firm Award – Hugh Stubbins and Associates
- Grand Prix de Rome, architecture – Daniel Kahane
- RAIA Gold Medal – William Godfrey
- RIBA Royal Gold Medal – Nikolaus Pevsner

== Births ==
- May 5 – Ksenija Bulatović, Serbian architect
- November 13 – Luis de Garrido, Spanish specialist in sustainable architecture
- Philippe Rahm, Swiss specialist in sustainable architecture

== Deaths ==
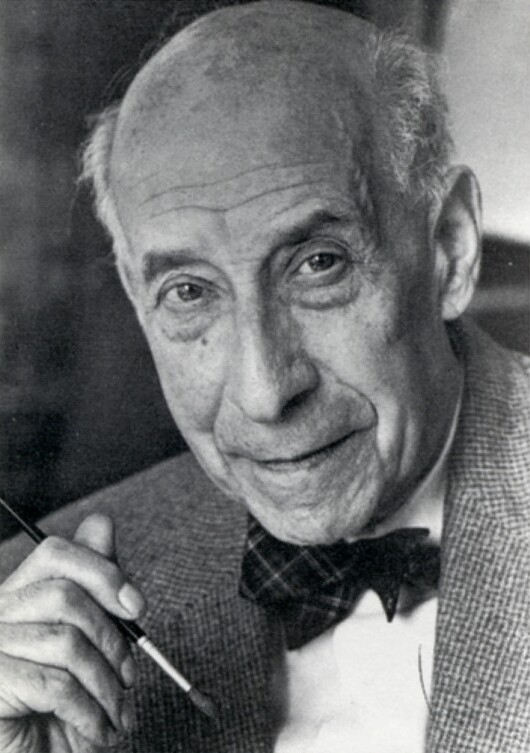
Josef Frank

- January 8 – Josef Frank, Austrian-born Swedish architect and designer (born 1885)
- February 13 – Francisco Gianotti, Italian-born Art Nouveau architect (born 1881)
- July 6 – Piero Portaluppi, Italian architect (born 1888)
- July 21 – Eižens Laube, Latvian architect (born 1880)
- August – Malachi Leo Elliott, Florida-based architect (born 1886)
- December 6 – Robert D. Farquhar, California-based architect (born 1872)
- December 18 – Barry Byrne, American architect of the "Prairie School" (born 1883)
