= Labourdette =

Labourdette is a French surname derived from Gascon language

People with the surname Labourdette include:

- Bernard Labourdette (1946–2022), road bicycle racer
- Elina Labourdette (1919–2014), French film actress
- Jacques Henri-Labourdette (1915–2003), French architect

== See also ==
- Laborde
