= Jacques Henri-Labourdette =

French architect

Jacques Henri-Labourdette ( 2 July 1915 in Paris – 27 May 2003 in Saint-Laurent-du-Var (Alpes-Maritimes)) was a 20th-century French architect.

== Biography ==
Son of the industrial coachbuilder Jean Henri-Labourdette, he was a student at the École nationale supérieure des beaux-arts, where he joined the studio of Charles Lemaresquier. In 1945, he founded the Boileau-Labourdette firm with Roger Boileau. This was transformed into a vast agency from 1961, including an architectural agency (Suabla) and a technical design office (Sethia). The agency still exists but under another name, "Synthèse Architecture"

AS representative of the Modern Movement, Jacques Henri-Labourdette made a name for himself in France for his projects, which were marked by modernism and technical innovation. Renowned for his large housing complexes, he worked closely with social housing providers such as OCIL, which was responsible for the 1% housing program, and SCIC, the real estate company of the Caisse des dépôts et consignations. It is estimated that he built 65,000 homes during his career.

He served as the government's consulting architect for 17 years. In 1968, he was appointed technical advisor to the Minister of Infrastructure, Albin Chalandon, who was a proponent of industrialized single-family homes.

He was married to Marie Blanche de Montferrand, who died on 9 May 2017. They have one daughter

== Important works ==
- 1949–1952: Reconstruction of the southern districts of Beauvais
- 1951–1961: bus station in Clermont-Ferrand with Valentin Vigneron
- 1955: Immeuble de l'Épargne de France, Paris
- 1955–1970: Large housing complex in Lochères, Sarcelles, in collaboration with Roger Boileau
- 1959–1969: Sanitas district in Tours (Indre-et-Loire) (3,000 housing units)
- 1960: Tour Albert with Édouard Albert and Roger Boileau, the first residential tower in Paris with a tubular steel frame[4].
- 1960–1962: Les Labourdettes, a housing complex consisting of three towers, Gaston Castel project, Cours Belsunce in Marseille (designated a "20th-century heritage site" in 2007)
- 1962–1966: large housing complex of Domaine Gazier in Choisy-le-Roi-Orly (Val-de-Marne)
- 1966: Le Clos-Guillaume, Val d'Yerre, Epinay-sous-Sénart (Essonne)
- 1967–1969: Grenoble University Institute of Technology (now IUT A then IUT1 Grenoble)

== Publications ==
- « L’architecte face à l’industrialisation. Vivre son temps », Techniques et architecture, 27^{e} série, n^{o} 5, février 1967
- Aventure d'architecte, S.A Éditeur Chiasso, 1975
- « Réflexions sur les tracés urbains : les grands ensembles », Cahiers du CREPIF, n^{o} 17, décembre 1986, p. 21–30
- Jacques Henri-Labourdette, architecte – Une vie, une œuvre, éd. Gilletta-Nice-Matin, Nice, 2002, 158 p.
