= 1969 in architecture =

The year 1969 in architecture involved some significant architectural events and new buildings.

== Events ==
- January 8 – At the Smithsonian Institution in Washington, D.C., the Hirshhorn Museum and Sculpture Garden building is begun, with ground-breaking by President of the United States Lyndon B. Johnson, Chief Justice Earl Warren, and the Secretary S. Dillon Ripley.
- April 3 – Pope Paul VI promulgates the apostolic constitution Missale Romanum which confirms the desirability of celebration of Mass facing the congregation in Catholic churches, with implication for their internal layout.

== Buildings and structures ==
=== Buildings opened ===
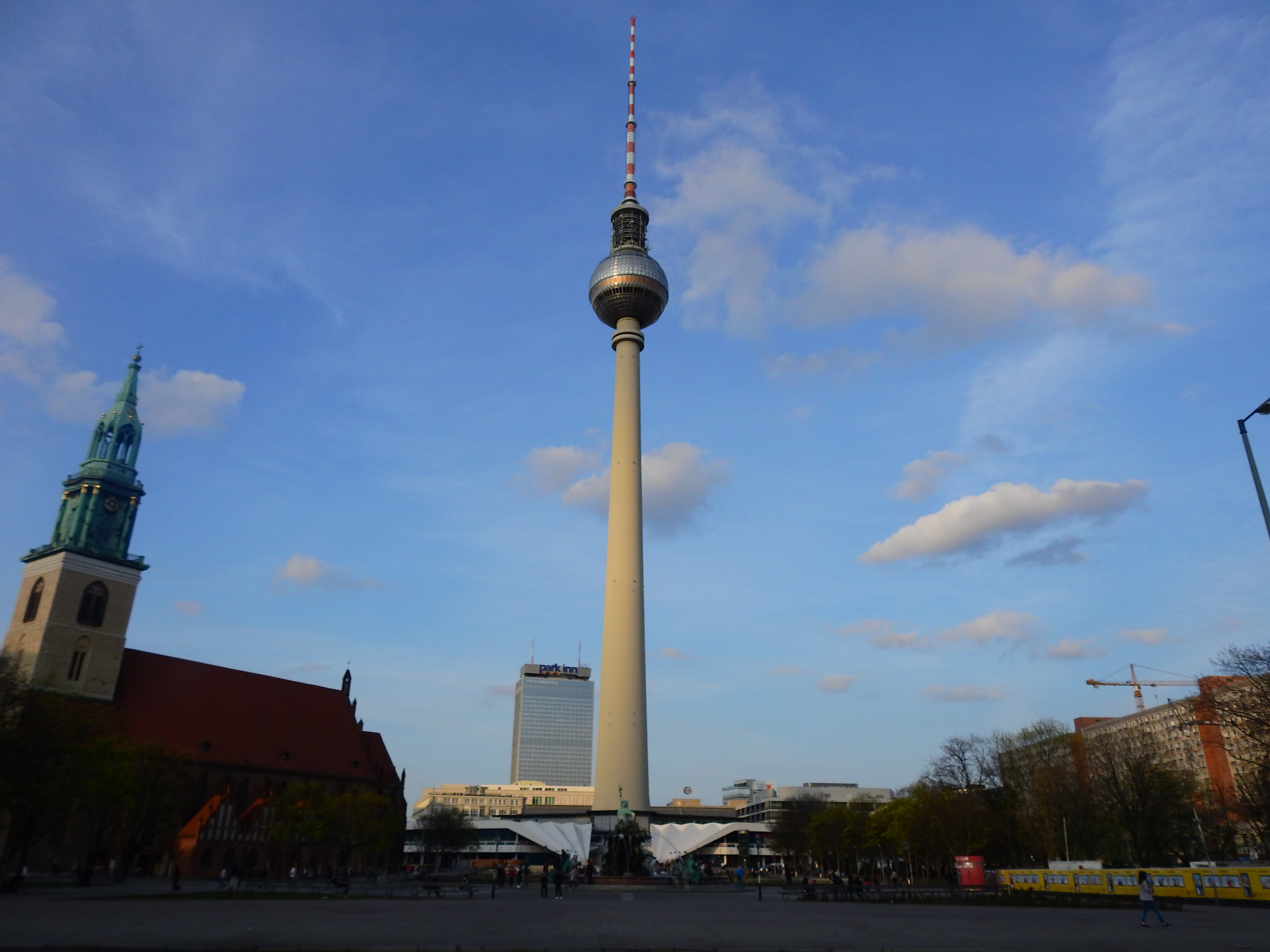
Fernsehturm Berlin

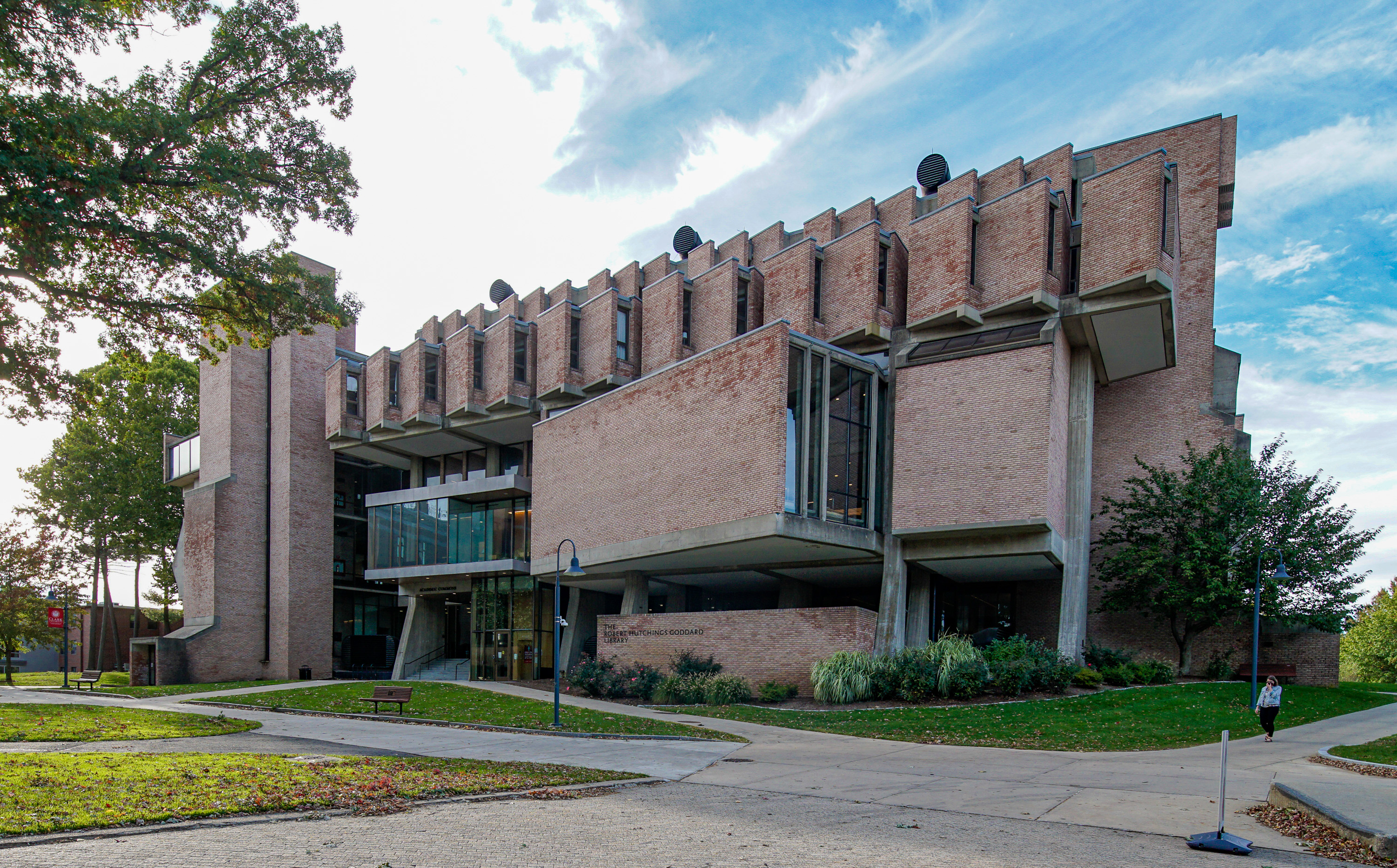
Robert H. Goddard Library

- March 7 – The John Hancock Center in Chicago, Illinois, by Skidmore, Owings and Merrill.
- May 19 — Robert H. Goddard Library, Clark University, designed by John M. Johansen.
- June – Houses for Visiting Mathematicians, University of Warwick, Coventry, England, designed by Bill Howell of Howell, Killick, Partridge and Amis.
- September 18 – Dresden TV tower (Fernsehturm Dresden-Wachwit) begins radio transmission in Dresden, Germany.
- October 3 – Fernsehturm Berlin (Berlin TV tower) in East Berlin, Germany.
- St. John's Beacon in Liverpool, England.

=== Buildings completed ===
- Knights of Columbus Building (New Haven, Connecticut), designed by Roche-Dinkeloo
- One New York Plaza, Manhattan, New York City, designed by William Lescaze & Associates and Kahn & Jacobs
- Bank One Plaza, Chicago, Illinois (renamed as the Chase Tower on October 24, 2005)
- 555 California Street (formerly The Bank of America Center), San Francisco, California, the tallest building west of the Mississippi from 1969 to 1972
- Sultan Yahya Petra Bridge, Kelantan, Malaysia
- Toronto-Dominion Centre (formerly the Royal Trust Tower) is partially completed in Toronto, Ontario, Canada
- Hilton Hotel, Paradise, Nevada, designed by architect Martin Stern, Jr.
- Ullasund Bridge, Norway (replaced in 1998)
- Wyndham Court, Southampton, England
- Span Developments houses at New Ash Green, Kent, England, designed by Eric Lyons
- Benjamin's Mount, Perry House or Teesdale (private residence), Westwood Road, Windlesham, Surrey, England, designed by Ernő Goldfinger
- Taivallahti Church, Helsinki, Finland, designed by Timo and Tuomo Suomalainen in 1960
- King George VI Memorial Chapel at St George's Chapel, Windsor Castle, Berkshire, England, designed by George Pace

== Awards ==
- AIA Gold Medal – William Wilson Wurster
- Architecture Firm Award – Jones & Emmons
- RAIA Gold Medal – Robin Boyd
- RIBA Royal Gold Medal – Jack Antonio Coia
- Twenty-five Year Award – Rockefeller Center

== Births ==
- February 28 – Sadie Morgan, English architect and designer
- date unknown – Sami Rintala, Finnish architect and artist

== Deaths ==
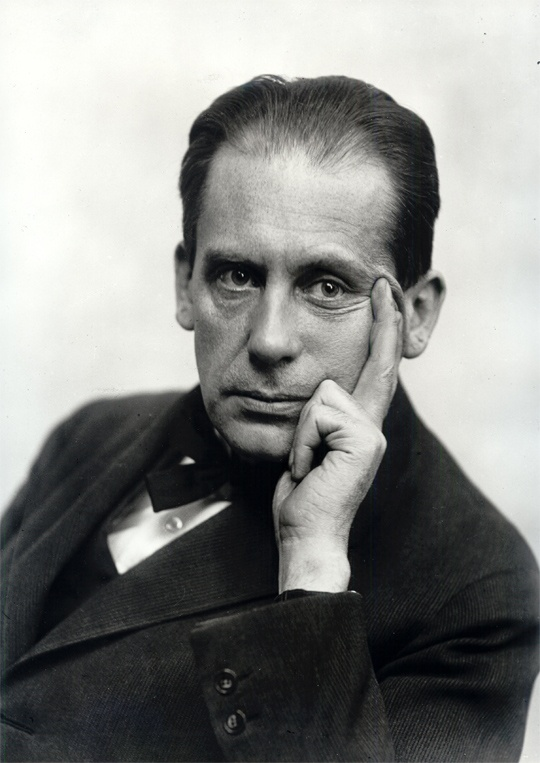
Walter Gropius

- February 11 – Frederic Joseph DeLongchamps, Nevada-based architect (born 1882)
- May 23 – Owen Williams, English structural engineer (died 1969)
- July 5 – Walter Gropius, German architect and founder of the Bauhaus School (born 1883)
- August 8 – Welton Becket, Los Angeles architect (born 1902)
- August 17 – Ludwig Mies van der Rohe, German-American architect and last director of the Bauhaus (born 1886)
- August 19 – Sir Percy Thomas, Cardiff-based architect (born 1883)
- November 7 – Ernesto Nathan Rogers, Italian architect, writer and educator (born 1909)
- December 15 – Ruth Rivera Marín, Mexican architect (born 1927)
