= 1915 in architecture =

The year 1915 in architecture involved some significant architectural events and new buildings.

== Buildings and structures ==
=== Buildings opened ===
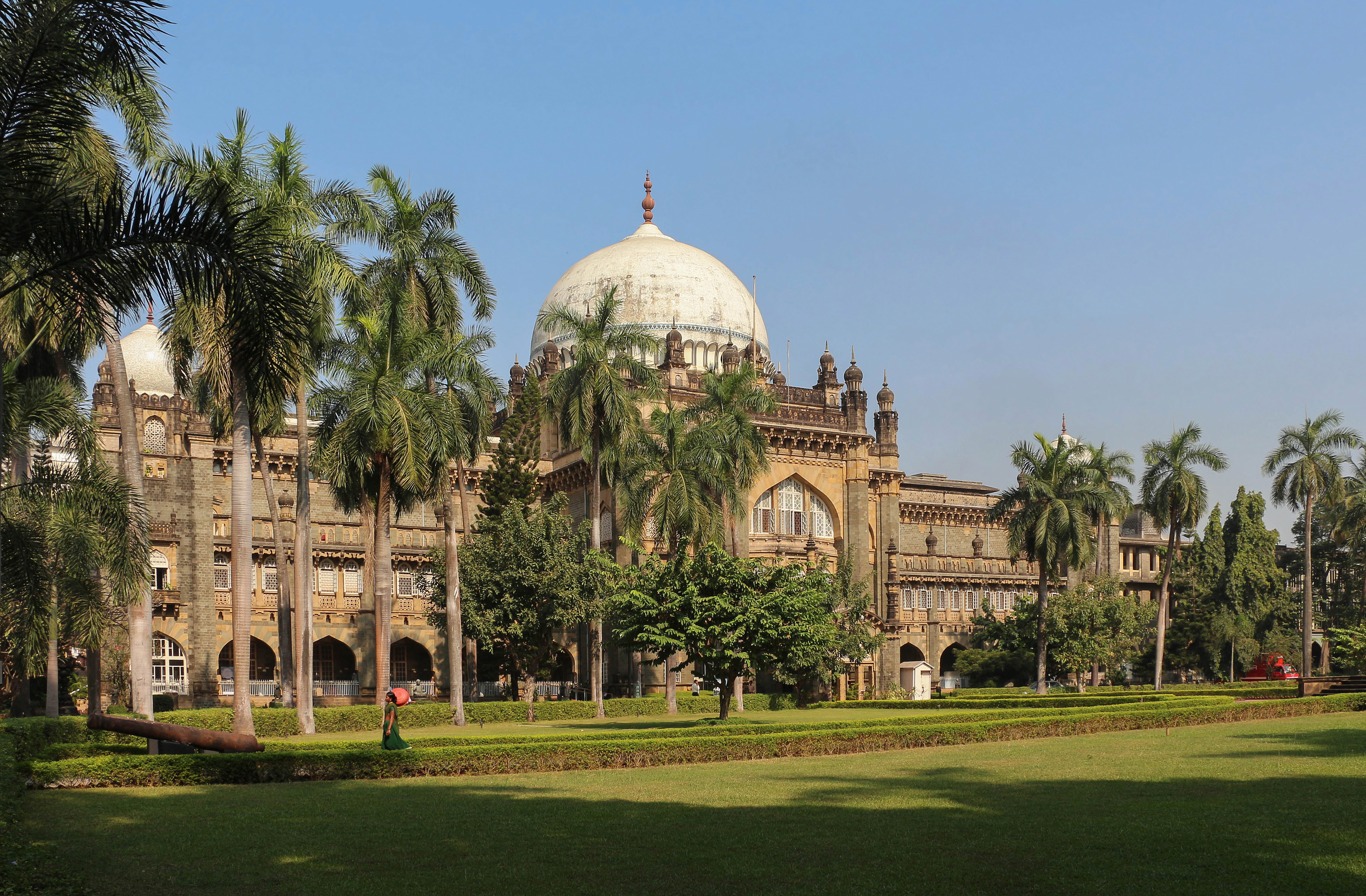
Prince of Wales Museum

- April – The Hiroshima Prefectural Commercial Exhibition, designed by Jan Letzel, is opened; it becomes the Hiroshima Peace Memorial.
- April 21 – Theatre Circo, Braga, Portugal.
- November 6 – Tunkhannock Viaduct, Nicholson, Pennsylvania, designed by Abraham Burton Cohen.

=== Buildings completed ===
- Prince of Wales Museum of Western India, Bombay, designed by George Wittet.
- Kumarakottam Temple, Kanchipuram, India rebuilt.
- Yosemite Lodge at the Falls, Yosemite Village, California.
- Well Hall Estate for arsenal workers at Woolwich in south-east London, designed by Frank Baines.

== Awards ==
- RIBA Royal Gold Medal – Frank Darling.
- Grand Prix de Rome, architecture: not held.

== Births ==
- April 22 – Edward Larrabee Barnes, American architect (died 2004)
- May 8 – Laurent Chappis, French architect and town planner (died 2013)
- October 4 – Beverly Loraine Greene, African American architect (died 1957)
- December 12 – Tobias Faber, Danish architect and academic (died 2010)
- December 31 – George Pace, English ecclesiastical architect (died 1975)
- Naoum Shebib, Egyptian architect (died 1985)

== Deaths ==
Albert Schickedanz

- February 17 – George Franklin Barber, American residential architect (born 1854)
- April 17 – Philip Webb, English architect (born 1831)
- May 28 – Robert Chisholm, British "Indo-Saracenic" architect (born 1840)
- June 25 – John James Clark, Australian architect (born 1838)
- July 11 – Albert Schickedanz, Austro-Hungarian architect and painter in the Eclectic style (born 1846)
