= 1973 in architecture =

The year 1973 in architecture involved some significant architectural events and new buildings.

== Buildings and structures ==
=== Buildings opened ===
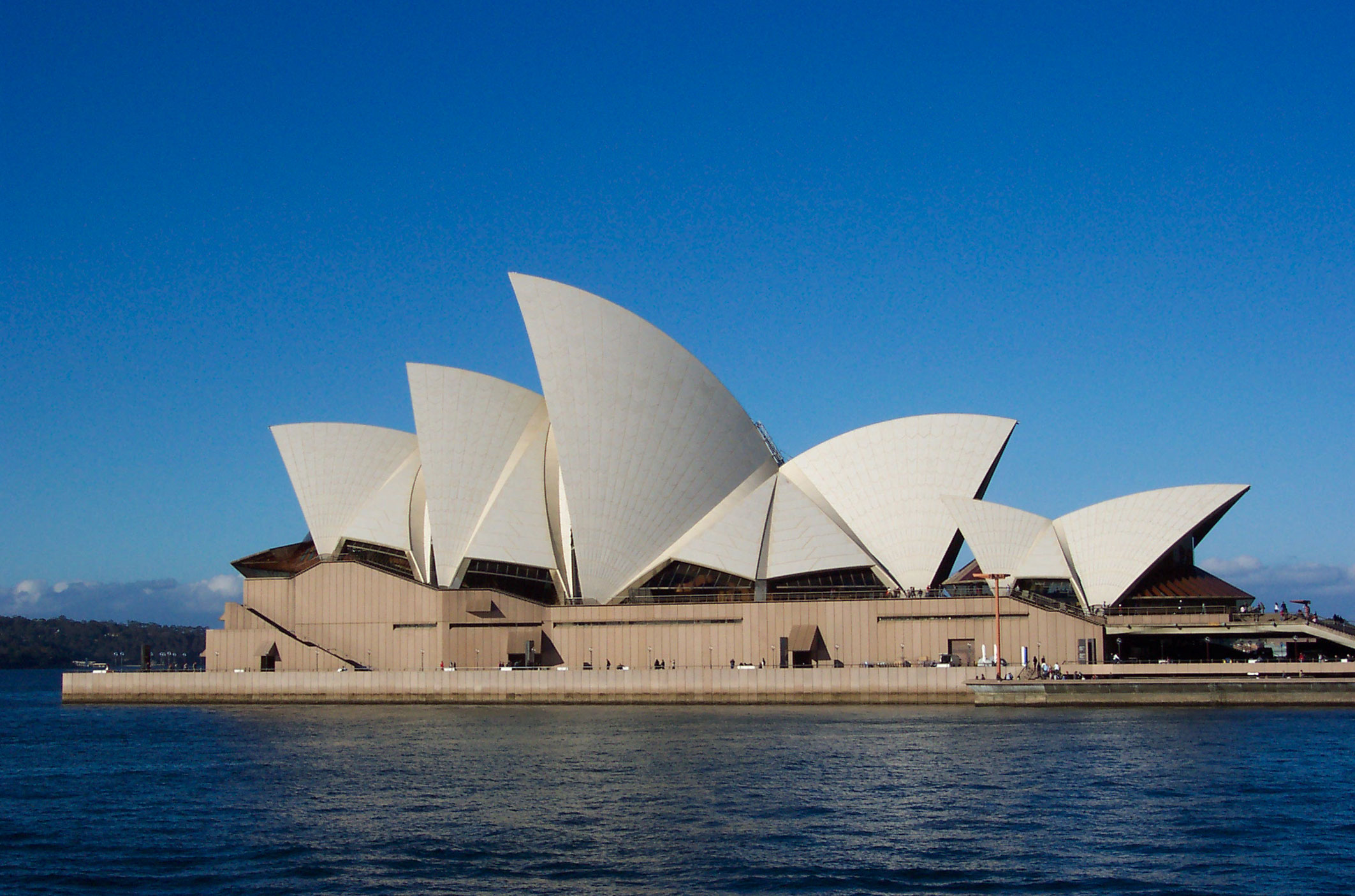
Sydney Opera House

- February 14 – Vicksburg Bridge over the Mississippi River, United States.
- April 4 – The World Trade Center in New York City, designed by Minoru Yamasaki.
- May 10 – General Belgrano Bridge, over the Paraná River, Argentina.
- June 29 – Clifton Cathedral (Roman Catholic) in Bristol, England, designed by R. J. Weeks with F. S. Jennett and A. Poremba of the Percy Thomas Partnership.
- July 19 – National Stadium, Singapore.
- August 25 – Jesús Soto Museum of Modern Art in Ciudad Bolívar, Venezuela, designed by Carlos Raúl Villanueva.
- September – Kenyatta International Conference Centre in Nairobi, Kenya, designed by Karl Henrik Nøstvik.
- October 20 – Sydney Opera House in Sydney, Australia, designed by Jørn Utzon.
- October 30 – Bosphorus Bridge in Istanbul, Turkey.
- The Aon Center in Chicago, Illinois, United States, originally known as the Standard Oil Building.
- Sears Tower in Chicago, Illinois, United States, designed by Skidmore, Owings & Merrill, becomes the tallest building in the world.
- Uris Hall at Cornell University, designed by Gordon Bunshaft of Skidmore, Owings & Merrill
- Theatr Ardudwy at Coleg Harlech in Wales, designed by Colwyn Foulkes & Partners.

=== Buildings completed ===
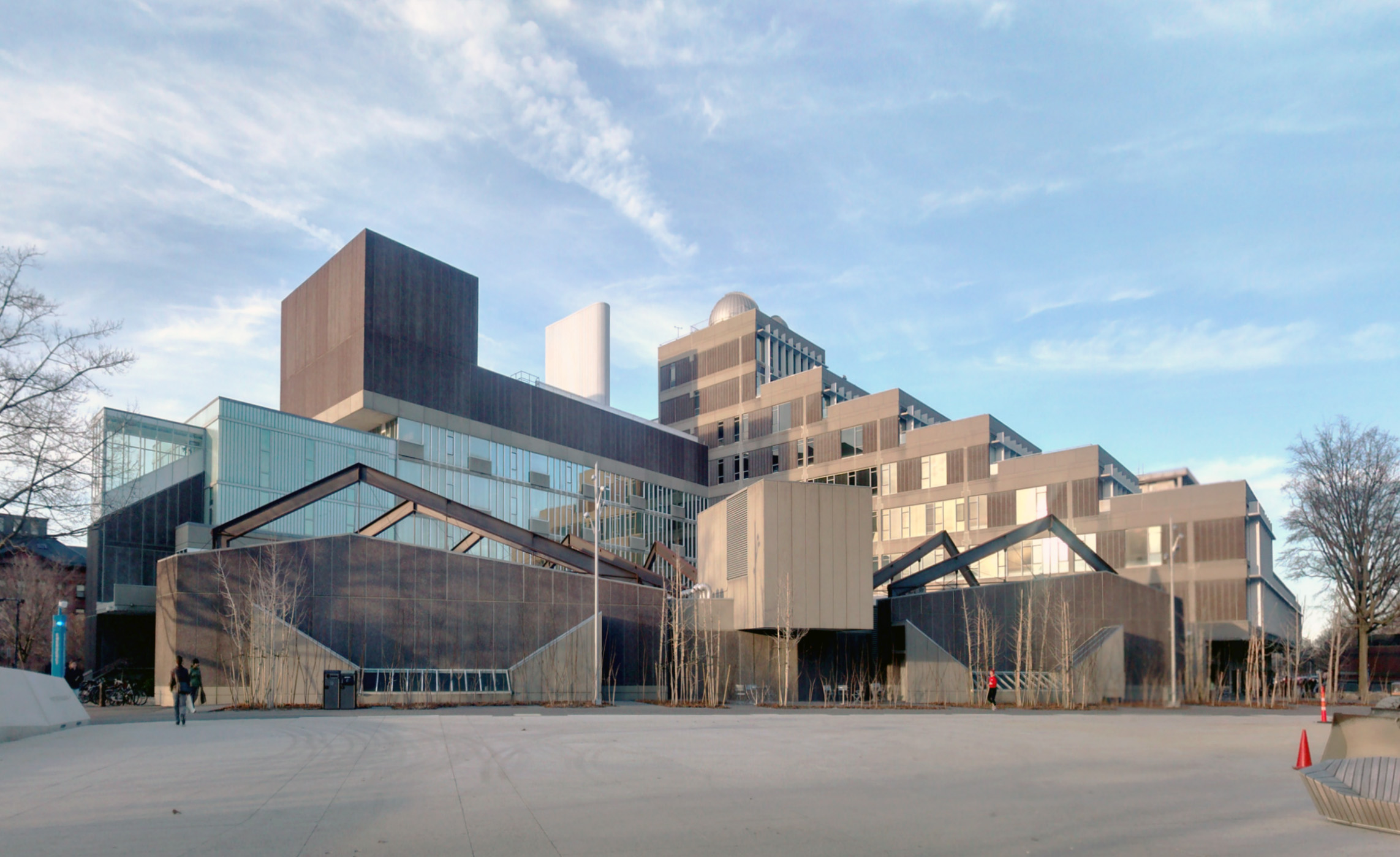
Harvard Science Center at Harvard University, Boston, USA

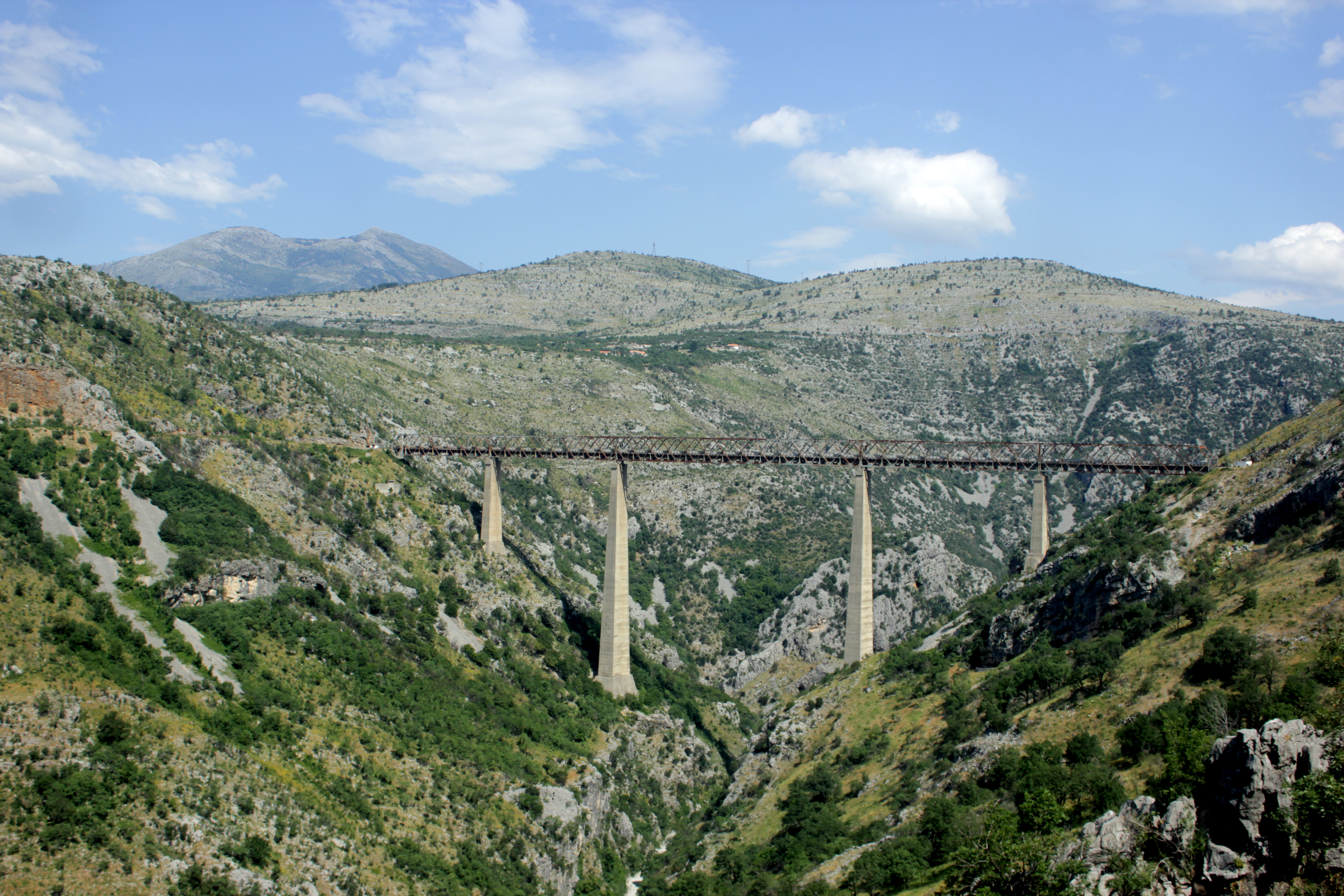
Mala Rijeka Viaduct, Podgorica, Montenegro

- May – Sears Tower, Chicago, designed by Skidmore, Owings & Merrill.
- September 4 – First Wisconsin Center in Milwaukee, Wisconsin.
- date unknown
  - Alpha Tower, Birmingham, England, designed by George Marsh of Richard Seifert & Partners.
  - The Carlton Centre in Johannesburg, South Africa, becomes the tallest building in South Africa and in Africa (1973–present).
  - Großgaststätte Ahornblatt, Berlin, Germany (demolished in 2000).
  - Harvard Science Center at Harvard University, Boston, Massachusetts, designed by Josep Lluís Sert.
  - IDS Center in Minneapolis, Minnesota.
  - Boyana Residence, Sofia (later National Historical Museum (Bulgaria)), designed by Alexander Barov.
  - Underhill (underground residence), Holme, West Yorkshire, England, designed by Arthur Quarmby.
  - 29 1/2 Lansdowne Crescent, London (infill residence), designed by Jeremy Lever.
  - Kyiv TV Tower in Kyiv, Ukraine.
  - Mala Rijeka Viaduct, Podgorica, Montenegro.
  - Royal Centre (Vancouver) in Vancouver, British Columbia, Canada
  - Empire Landmark Hotel in Vancouver
  - Granville Square in Vancouver
  - Tour Montparnasse in Paris, France, designed by Eugène Beaudouin, Urbain Cassan and Louis Hoym de Marien.
  - Tower 2 of the Meritus Mandarin Singapore in Singapore.
  - Cromwell Tower in London, England.
  - Le Pyramide market in Abidjan, Ivory Coast, designed by Rinaldo Olivieri.
  - Zagreb TV Tower in Zagreb, Croatia..

== Events ==
- Vladimir Somov designs the Fyodor Dostoyevsky Theater of Dramatic Art for Veliky Novgorod.

== Awards ==
- American Academy of Arts and Letters Gold Medal – Louis Kahn
- Alvar Aalto Medal – Hakon Ahlberg
- Architecture Firm Award – Shepley Bulfinch Richardson and Abbott
- Prix de l'Académie d'Architecture de France – Kenzo Tange
- RAIA Gold Medal – Jørn Utzon
- RIBA Royal Gold Medal – Leslie Martin
- AIA Twenty-five Year Award – Taliesin West

== Births ==
- January 24 – Eero Endjärv, Estonian architect
- date unknown – Zahava Elenberg, Australian architect

== Deaths ==
- January 22 – Stanisław Staszewski, Polish architect and poet (born 1925)
- June 14 – Clifford Percy Evans, American architect (born 1889)
- June 27 – Odd Nansen, Norwegian architect, author, and humanitarian (born 1901)
- September 20 – Leslie Wilkinson, Australian architect (born 1882)
- December 8 – Paul Bartholomew, American architect (born 1883)
