= Gillian Howell =

British architect

Gillian Margaret "Jill" Howell (née Sarson, 1927–2000), was a British architect.

== Early life ==
She was born Gillian Margaret Sarson, on 3 November 1927 in Multan, in the western Punjab, British India, the daughter of Colonel Edward Vipan Sarson, commandant of the Royal Artillery training centre, and his Norwegian wife, Dagny Sarson. She was educated at the Royal School, Bath, followed by the Architectural Association School of Architecture in London.

== Career ==
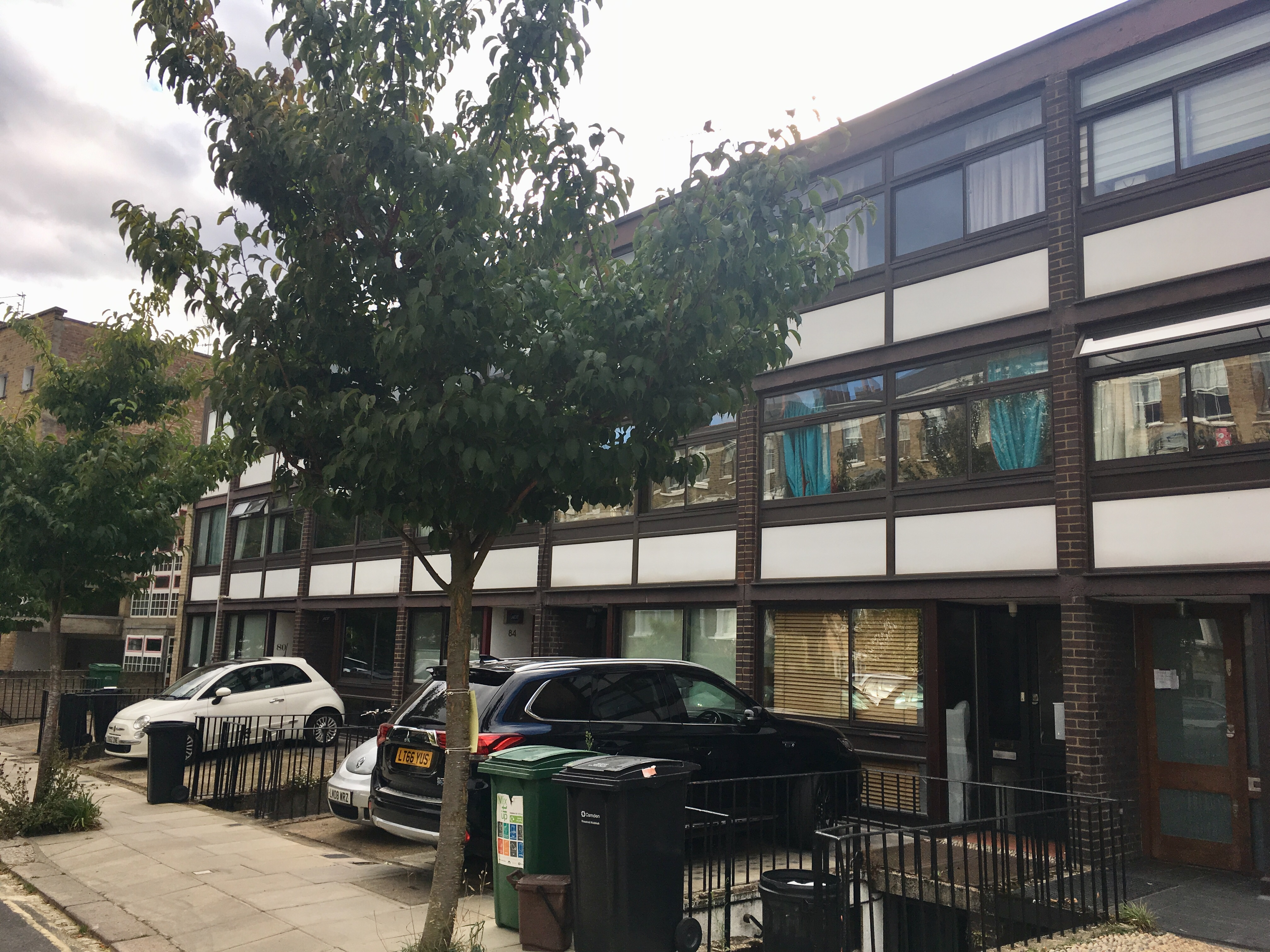
80–90 South Hill Park

As Gill Sarsen, together with her future husband, Bill Howell, and Stanley Amis, they designed a modernist terrace of six houses at Nos. 80-90 South Hill Park, on the south side of Hampstead Heath, to replace four Victorian houses lost to World War Two bombing. All three were employed by the London County Council's Architect's Department Housing Division, and they ended up living in two of the six houses. Their designs were highly influential and much publicised, and led to them working on the Alton Estate tower blocks in Roehampton. The terrace is now Grade II listed.

She later founded her own architectural practice with Jean Elrington. After her husband's early death, she continued teaching at the University of Cambridge school of architecture, and took over her husband's role as a governor of Marlborough College and advisor on its buildings.

== Personal life ==
She met her future husband, fellow architect Bill Howell on an Architectural Association School outing to the Bryn Mawr rubber factory in Wales. They married on 10 August 1951, and had three sons and one daughter. He died on 29 November 1974 in a car accident near Leighton Buzzard, Bedfordshire, aged 52.

In 1995, she married Mike Watt, a retired company secretary.

== Later life ==
On 2 May 2000, she died at her home, Fen Ditton Hall, Fen Ditton, Cambridge, from cancer, and was survived by her second husband.
