= 1882 in architecture =

The year 1882 in architecture involved some significant architectural events and new buildings.

== Events ==
- March 19 – Construction work begins on the church of Sagrada Família in Barcelona, Catalonia, Spain, to the design of Francisco de Paula del Villar y Lozano; it is scheduled for completion to the design of Antoni Gaudí in 2026.
- September 30 – Dedication of Hearthstone House, in Appleton, Wisconsin, United States, the first residential building to be powered by a centrally located hydroelectric station using the Edison system.
- Construction work begins on the Catholic church of St John the Baptist, Norwich, England, to the design of George Gilbert Scott Jr., who converted to Catholicism two years earlier; it will be consecrated in 1910, and again as a cathedral in 1976.

== Buildings and structures ==
=== Buildings opened ===
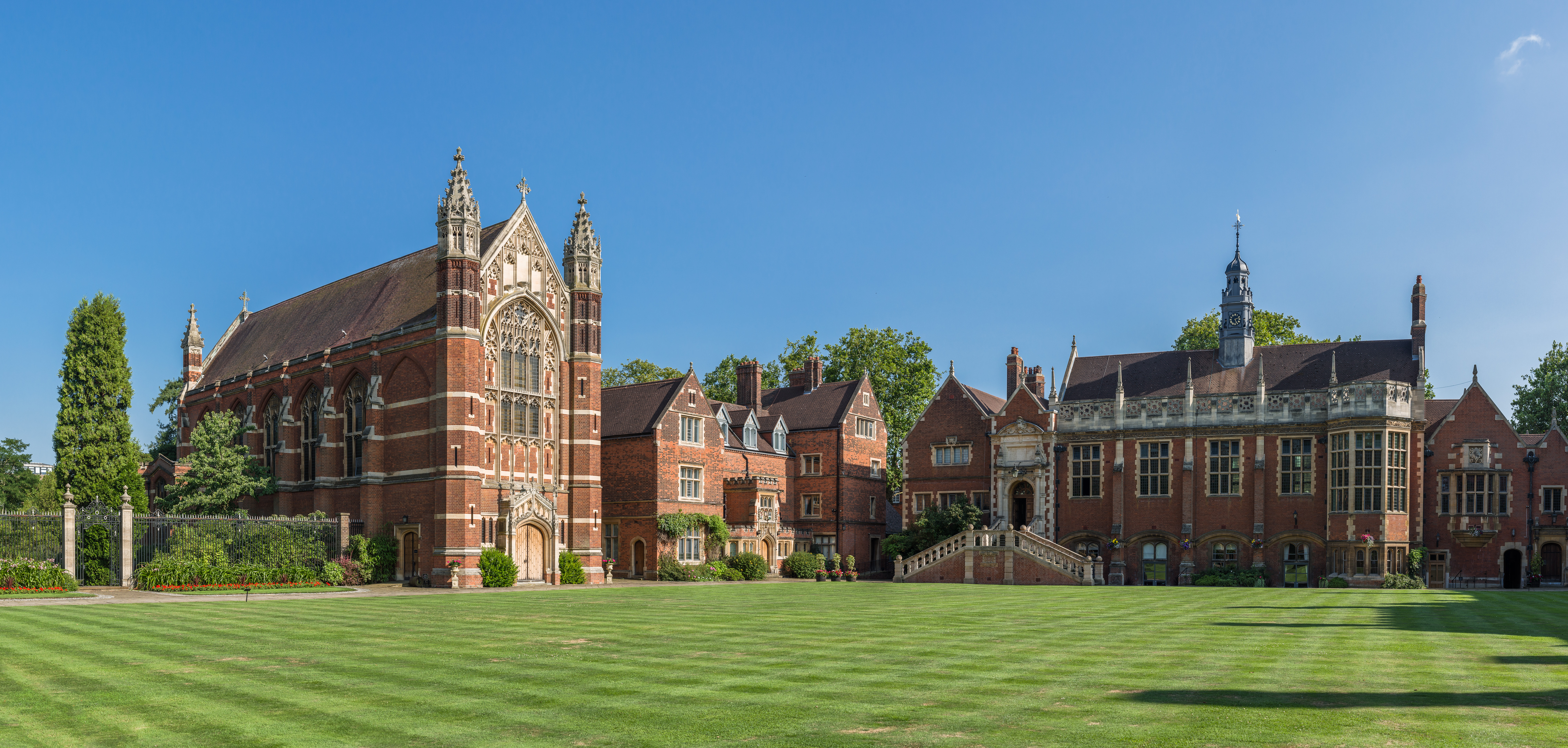
Selwyn College, Cambridge, England

- March 4 – Forth Bridge, Scotland opened.
- June 29 – Russian Monument, Sofia, unveiled.
- September 8 – St. Mary's Basilica, Bangalore, India, designed by Rev. L. E. Kleiner, consecrated.
- October – Conservative Club, Princes Street, Edinburgh, Scotland, designed by Robert Rowand Anderson.
- October 10 – Selwyn College, Cambridge, England, designed by Arthur Blomfield.
- December 25 – Hotel Roanoke, a luxury hotel in Roanoke, Virginia, United States, built by the Norfolk and Western Railway.

=== Buildings completed ===
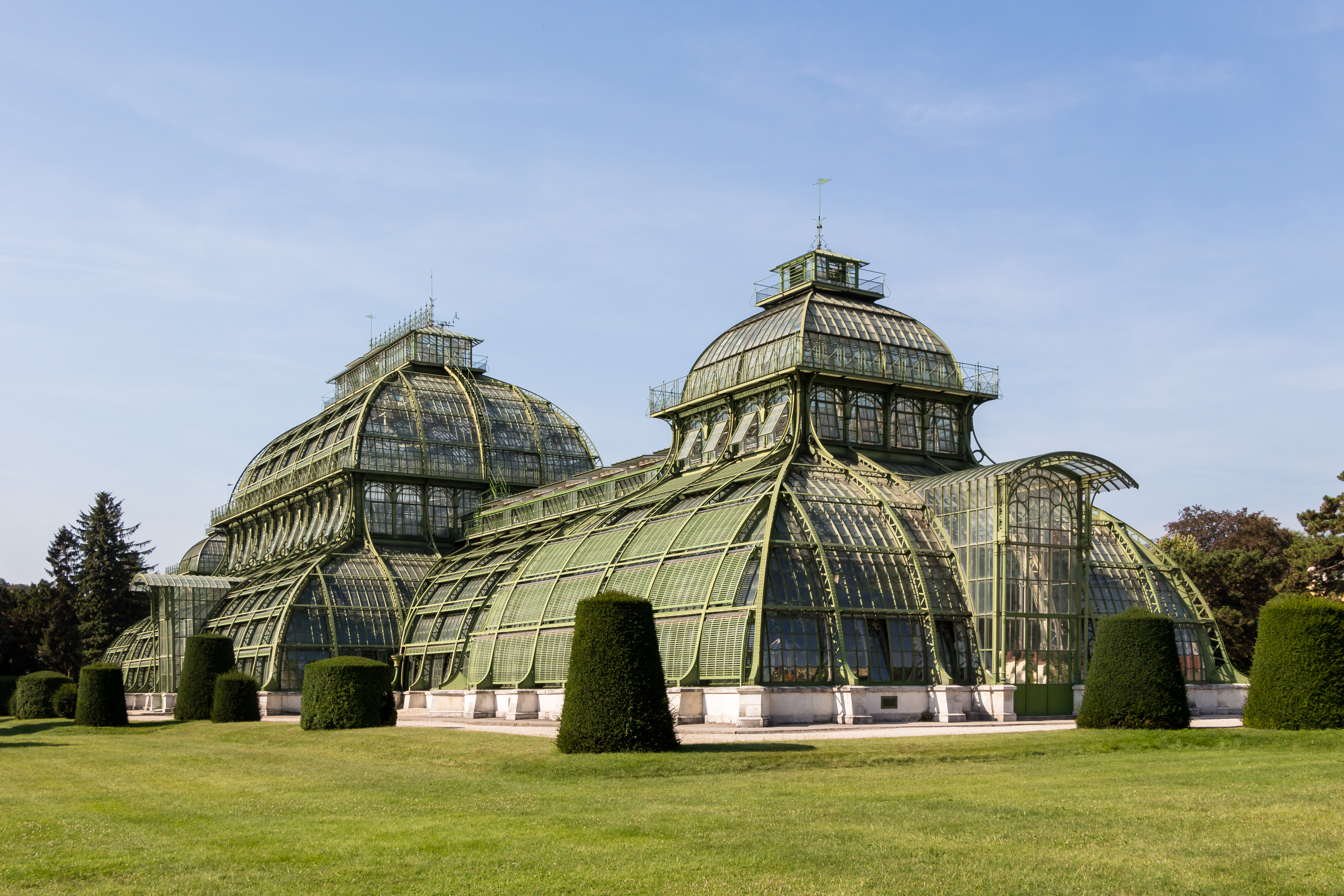
The Palmenhaus Schönbrunn in Vienna, Austria

- Hotel Gaillard, Paris, designed by Jules Février.
- Palmenhaus Schönbrunn (palm house) in Vienna.
- Pro-Cathedral of St. Vincent de Paul in Tunis.
- Church of St Mary Magdalene, East Moors, Helmsley, North Yorkshire, England, completed by Temple Moore to a design by George Gilbert Scott Jr.
- Thomas Crane Public Library in Quincy, Massachusetts, designed by Henry Hobson Richardson.
- Normand Memorial Hall, Dysart, Scotland, designed by Robert Rowand Anderson.
- A six-story architectural folly, Elephant Bazaar, later renamed as "Lucy the Elephant", constructed by James V. Lafferty in Margate City, New Jersey, United States.

== Awards ==
- RIBA Royal Gold Medal – Heinrich von Ferstel.

== Births ==
- January 2 – Frederic Joseph DeLongchamps, prolific Nevada architect (died 1969)
- January 3 – David Adler, Jewish-American architect practising in Chicago (died 1949)
- May 17 – Karl Burman, Estonian architect and painter (died 1965)
- July 2 – Francis Conroy Sullivan, Canadian architect (died 1929)
- July 25 – Wolff Schoemaker, Dutch Art Deco architect (died 1949)
- October 12 – Leslie Wilkinson, Australian architect (died 1973)
- December 12 – Edward Maufe, English architect (died 1974)

== Deaths ==
- June 29 – Joseph Hansom, English Gothic Revival architect (born 1803)
- December 4 – Virginio Vespignani, Italian architect (born 1808)
