= 1831 in architecture =

The year 1831 in architecture involved some significant events.

== Buildings and structures ==
=== Buildings ===
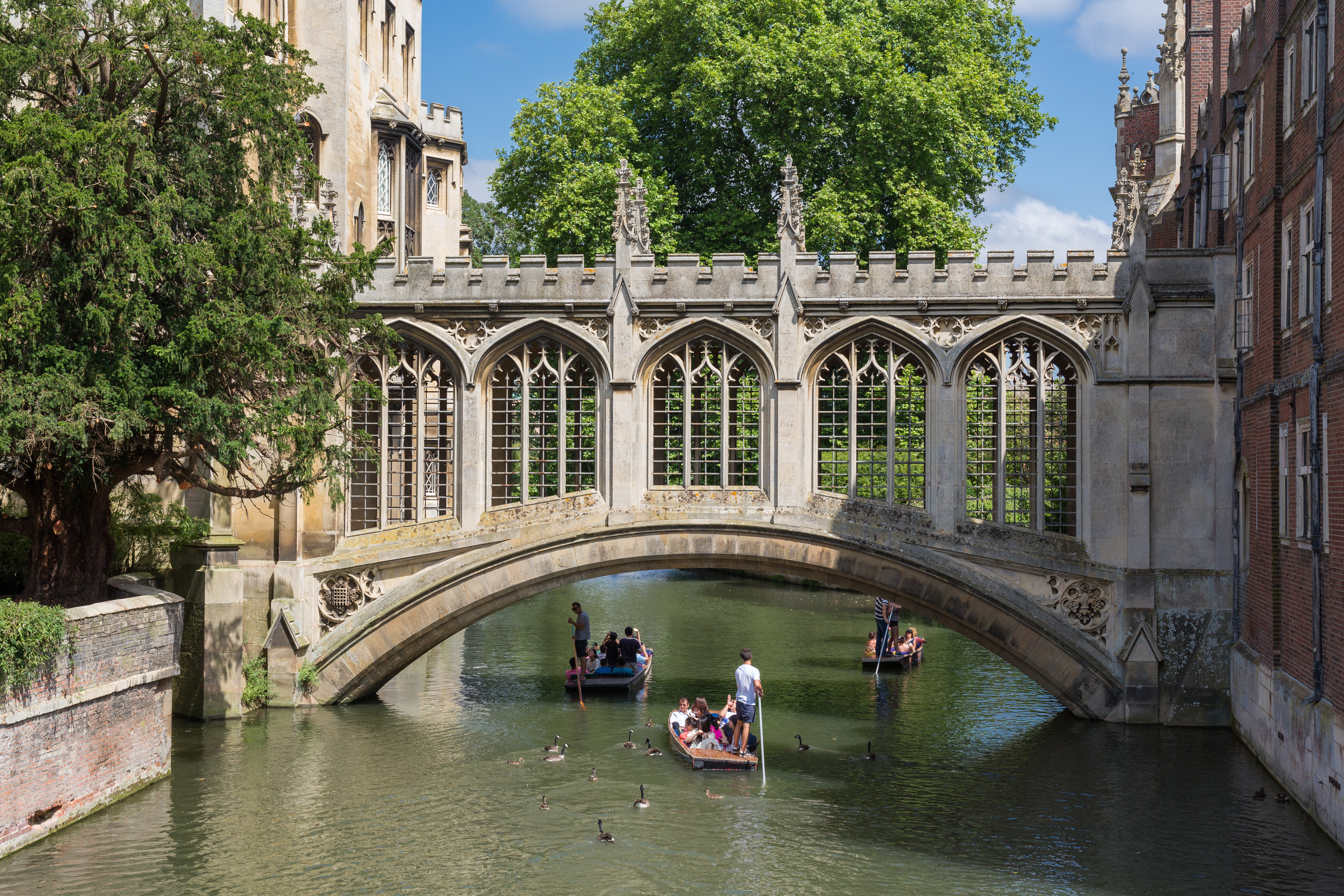
Bridge of Sighs (Cambridge)

- The Bridge of Sighs, St John's College, Cambridge, England, designed by Henry Hutchinson, is completed.
- The Dugald Stewart Monument in Edinburgh, Scotland, designed by W. H. Playfair, is completed.
- The Burns Monument, Edinburgh, is designed by Thomas Hamilton.
- North Church in Aberdeen, Scotland, designed by John Smith, is opened.
- Goodrich Court in Herefordshire, England, designed by Edward Blore, is completed.
- The Pedrocchi Café in Padua, Italy is completed.
- Waterloo Chamber at Windsor Castle in England, designed by Jeffry Wyatville, is constructed.

== Publications ==
- Augustus Charles Pugin publishes Examples of Gothic Architecture in London.

== Awards ==
- Grand Prix de Rome, architecture: Prosper Morey.

== Births ==
- January 12 – Philip Webb, English architect (died 1915)
- May 7 – Richard Norman Shaw, Scottish-born architect (died 1912)
- June 21 – John Henry Chamberlain, English architect (died 1883)

== Deaths ==
- December 8 – James Hoban, Irish architect working in the United States (born 1762)
