= 1883 in architecture =

The year 1883 in architecture involved some significant events.

== Buildings and structures ==
=== Buildings ===
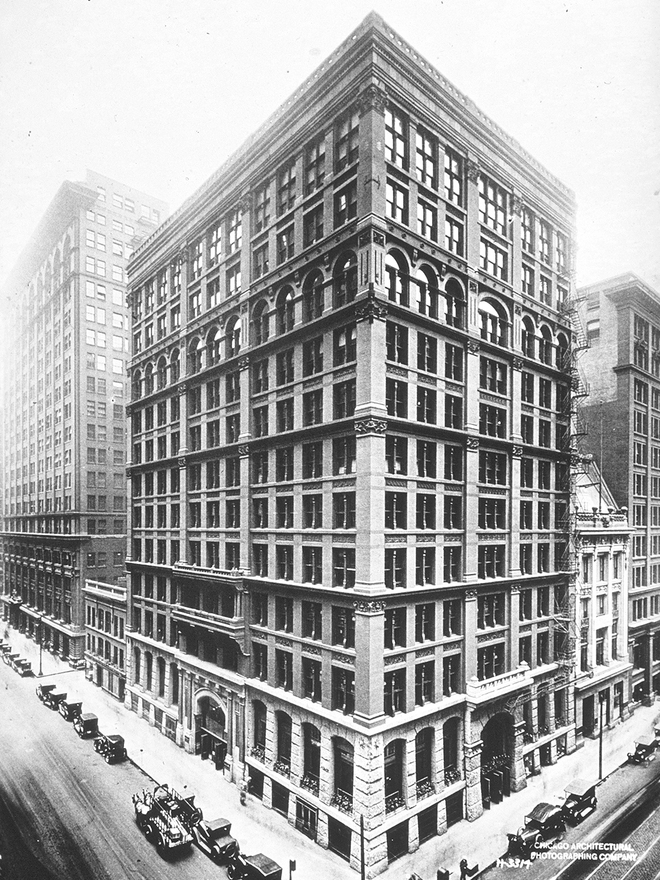
Home Insurance Building, Chicago

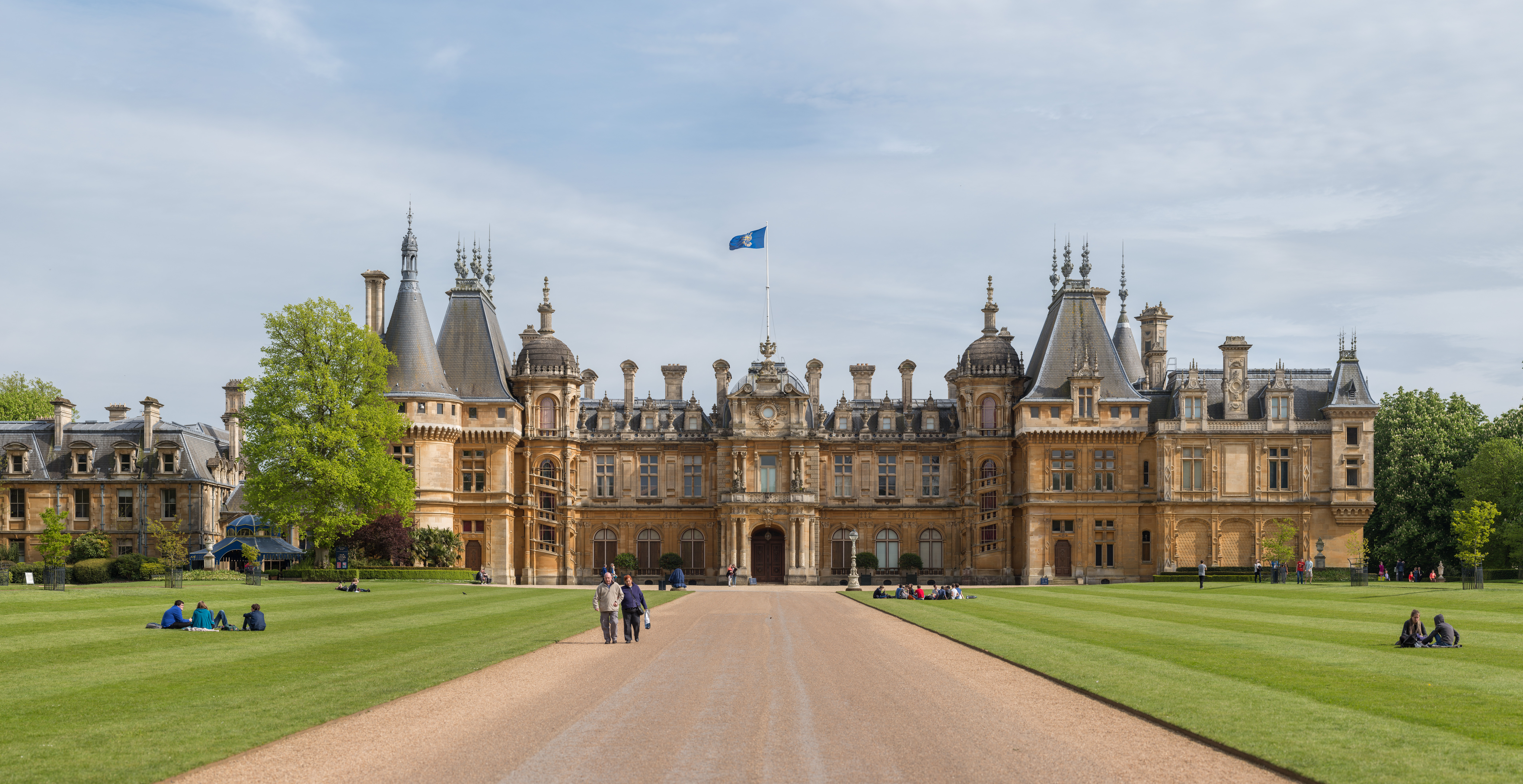
Waddesdon Manor, England

- March 10 – The Ames Free Library opens to the public "without fanfare and ceremony." Designed by Henry Hobson Richardson.
- May 1 – The Examination Schools of the University of Oxford, designed by Thomas G. Jackson, are formally opened.
- May 24 – Brooklyn Bridge, designed by John A. Roebling, is completed.
- May 26 – Cathedral of Christ the Saviour in Moscow, designed by Konstantin Thon, is dedicated.
- August 29 – Dunfermline Carnegie Library opened, the first of over 2,500 Carnegie Libraries funded by Andrew Carnegie.
- Albany City Hall in Albany, New York, designed by Henry Hobson Richardson in 'Richardsonian Romanesque' style, is completed.
- Vienna City Hall (Rathaus), designed by Friedrich von Schmidt in Gothic Revival style, is completed.
- The Home Insurance Building in Chicago designed by William LeBaron Jenney (demolished 1931).
- The Kuhns Building in Dayton, Ohio, is constructed.
- Hotel Windsor (Melbourne), Australia, designed by Charles Webb, is completed.
- Cane Hill Hospital in Coulsdon, London, is completed.
- Coney Hill Hospital (Gloucestershire County Asylum) in Gloucester, England, designed by John Giles and Edward Gough, is partially completed.
- Waddesdon Manor in Buckinghamshire, England, designed by Gabriel-Hippolyte Destailleur, is opened for guests.
- Billings Memorial Library at the University of Vermont in Burlington, designed by Henry Hobson Richardson, is built.
- New Church, Anerley, London, designed by W. J. E. Henley of the Concrete Building Company, completed.

== Awards ==
- RIBA Royal Gold Medal – Francis Penrose.
- Grand Prix de Rome, architecture: Gaston Redon.

== Births ==
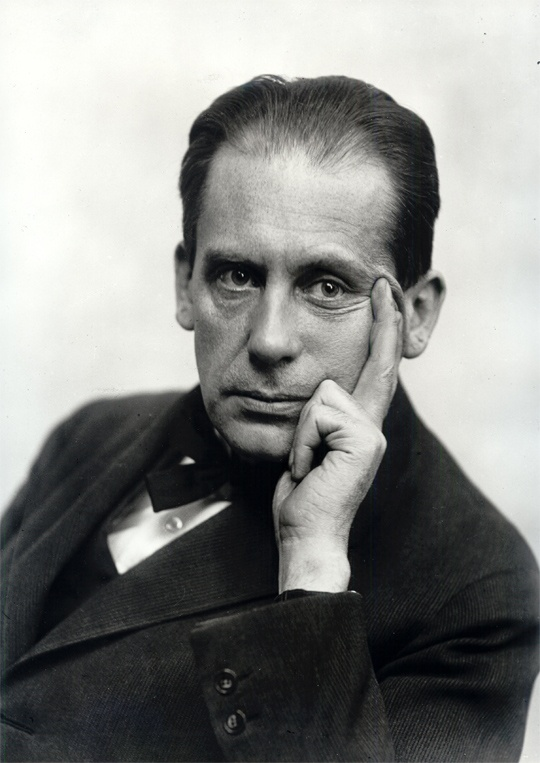
Walter Gropius

- January 8 – Robert Atkinson, English Art Deco architect (died 1952)
- February 15 – Richard Konwiarz, German architect (died 1960)
- May 18 – Walter Gropius, German modernist architect (died 1969)
- May 28 – Clough Williams-Ellis, British architect (died 1978)
- June 25 – Paul Bartholomew, American architect (died 1973)
- August 23 – Alker Tripp, English town planner (died 1954)
- August 30 – Theo van Doesburg, Dutch De Stijl architect (died 1931)
- December 19 – Barry Byrne, American Prairie School architect (died 1967)

== Deaths ==
- June 3 – Emilio De Fabris, Italian architect (born 1808)
- October 22 – John Henry Chamberlain, English Gothic Revival architect working in Birmingham (born 1831)
