= Gibbet Hill (University of Warwick) =

Campus of the University of Warwick

Coordinates: 52.38°N 1.56°W

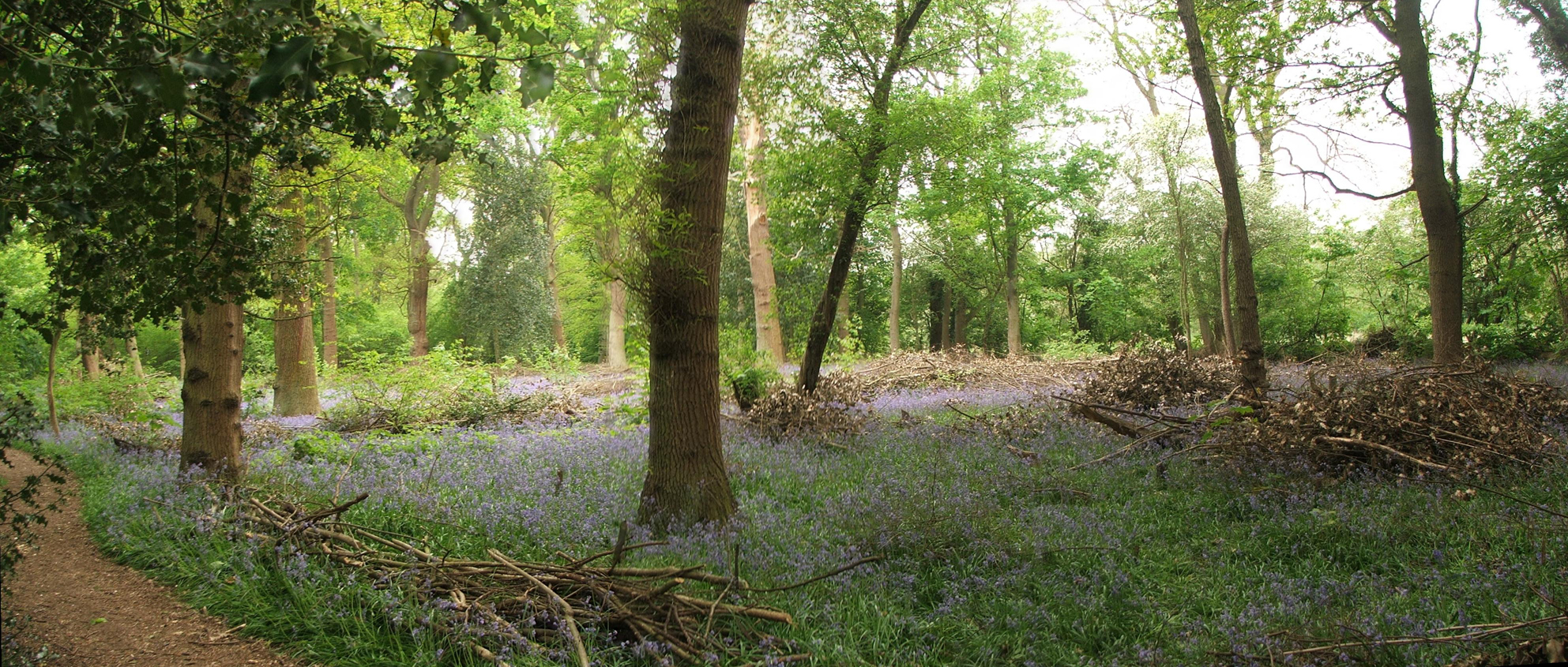
Tocil Wood in May

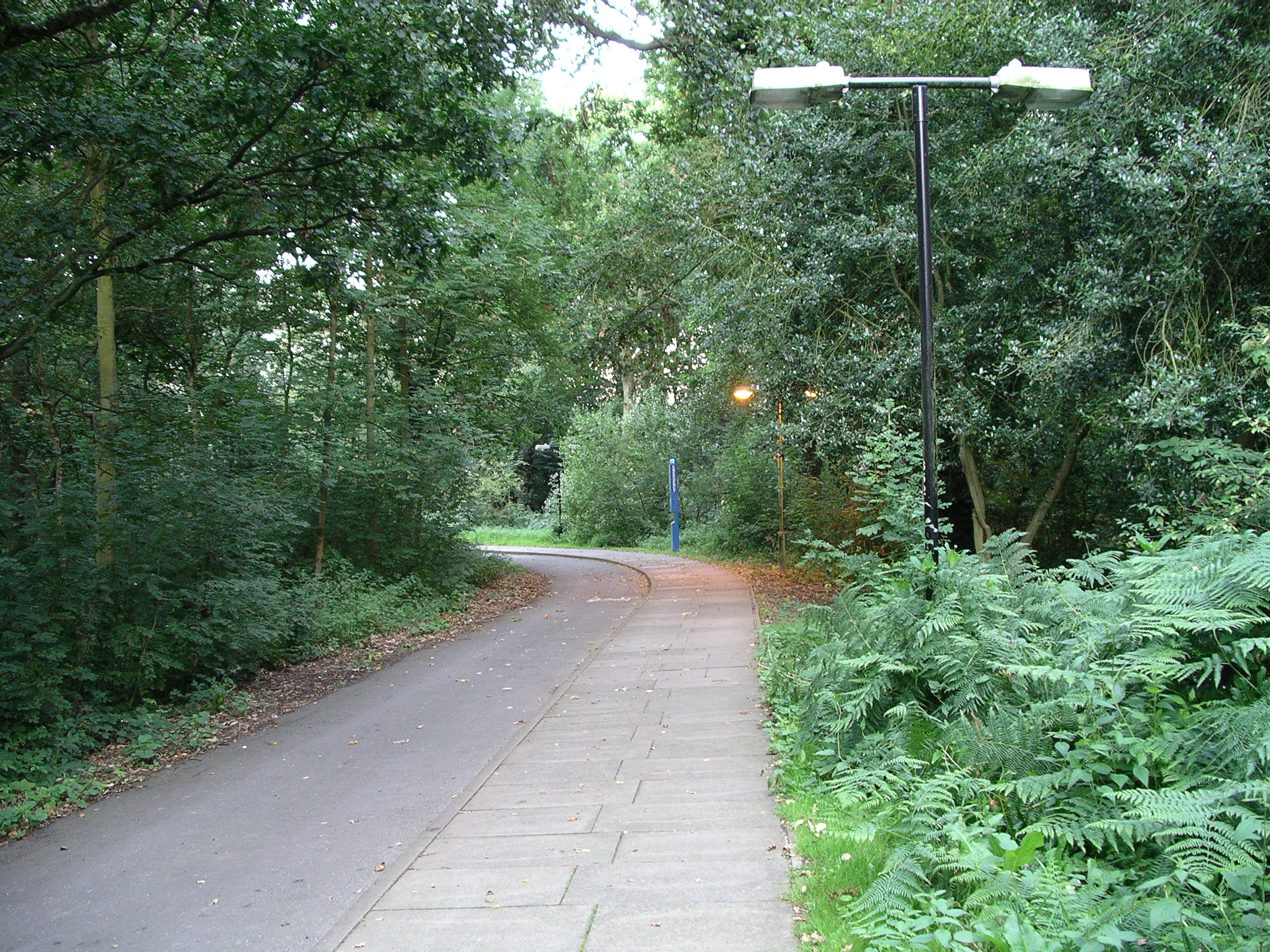
The path through Tocil Wood

Gibbet Hill is the location of, and name for, the University of Warwick's southern campus, in the south of Coventry, England.

The Gibbet Hill campus is home to the School of Life Sciences, the University's Estates Office, Warwick Medical School, and some maths houses. The campus also has its own cafe, serving hot and cold meals throughout the day.

Gibbet Hill is southeast of the university's main campus, which can be reached by a path through Tocil Wood or by Gibbet Hill Road. It is approximately one kilometre from the heart of the central campus, a 10–12 minute walk. Gibbet Hill is 25–30 minutes on foot from the Westwood Campus. It is also a small, prosperous district of southern Coventry.

In recent years, redevelopment work has taken place at Gibbet Hill, including the conversion of some former mathematics facilities into medical teaching buildings.

== Early years ==
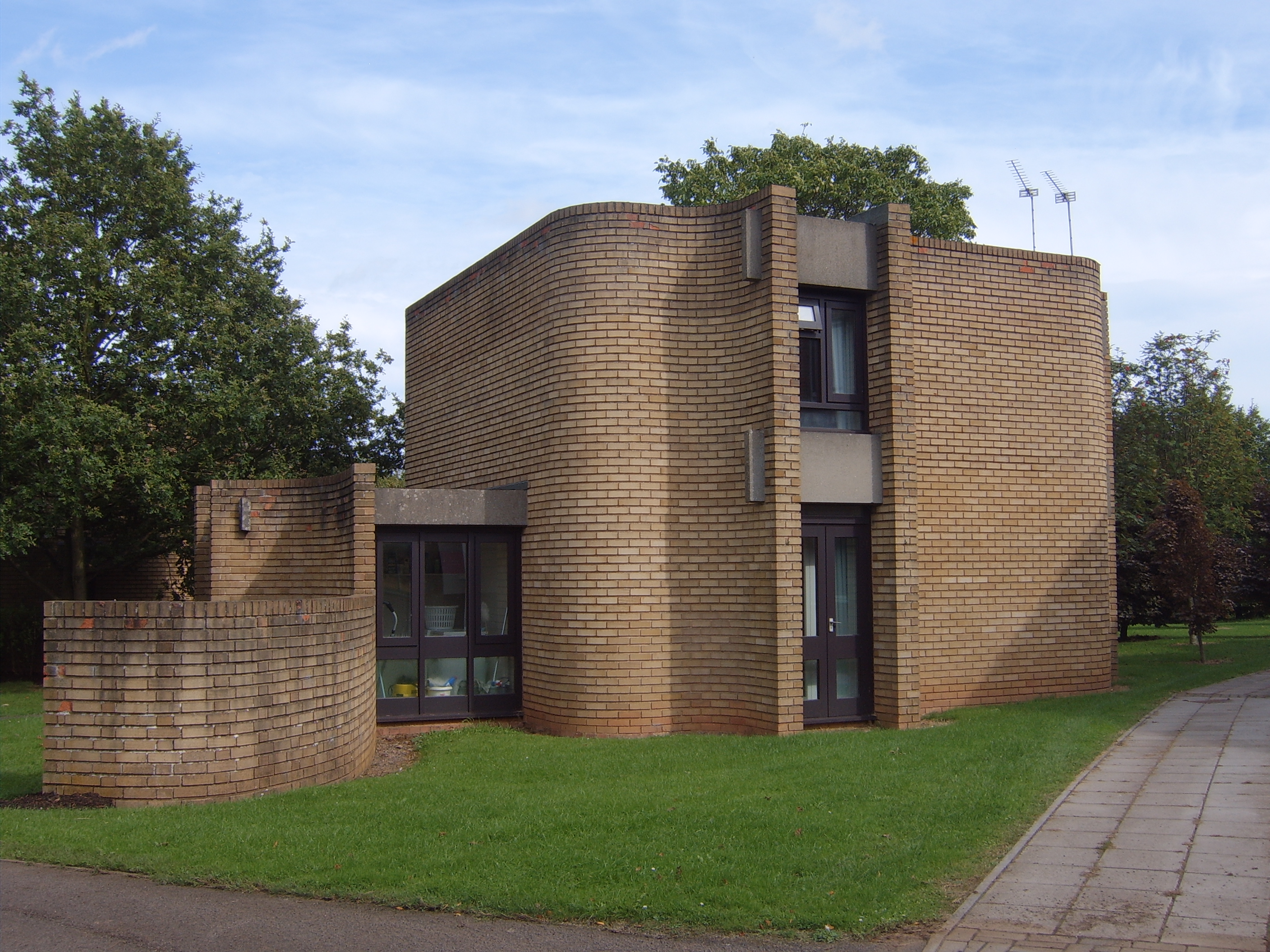
One of the Houses for Visiting Mathematicians

Gibbet Hill campus was originally known as 'East Site', and until the 1997 redevelopment and extension of the (then) Mathematics and Biology buildings, the lecture theatres were named accordingly as ELT1 and ELT2. They are now named GLT1 and GLT2.

The Gibbet Hill site was the entire campus for the first few years of the University of Warwick's existence. The original 1960s building at the core of the development housed offices and tutorial rooms for all university departments, together with the two lecture theatres. Students in their first year shared many general lectures, whatever their subject - on the first day they were all addressed together in ELT1. The two-storey building that was part of the Estates Office was the original library. In 1968 the University obtained a £50,000 grant from the Nuffield Foundation to build five houses and two flats as accommodation for mathematicians visiting conferences at Warwick; these houses are Grade II* listed and are still in use.

At that time the university also occupied Wainbody House in Stoneleigh Road, and 6 Gibbet Hill Road. Wainbody House continued to be used for office accommodation until it was sold by the university in 2004 for £695,000 and converted into flats. 6 Gibbet Hill Road was rented as postgraduate accommodation for several years, but is now used by the university chaplaincy.

Gibbet Hill Road contains a number of large detached properties, many of which date from before 1930, and along with Kenilworth Road & Cryfield Grange Road it is known to be Coventry's premier residential location on the Warwickshire border.

The university also maintained a house at 110 Kenilworth Road as the residence of its vice-chancellor. This property was sold in 1985 with the proceeds of the sale used to finance the renovation of Cryfield Farmhouse and its outbuildings for the use of Warwick's vice-chancellors.
