= Bill Howell (architect) =

British architect

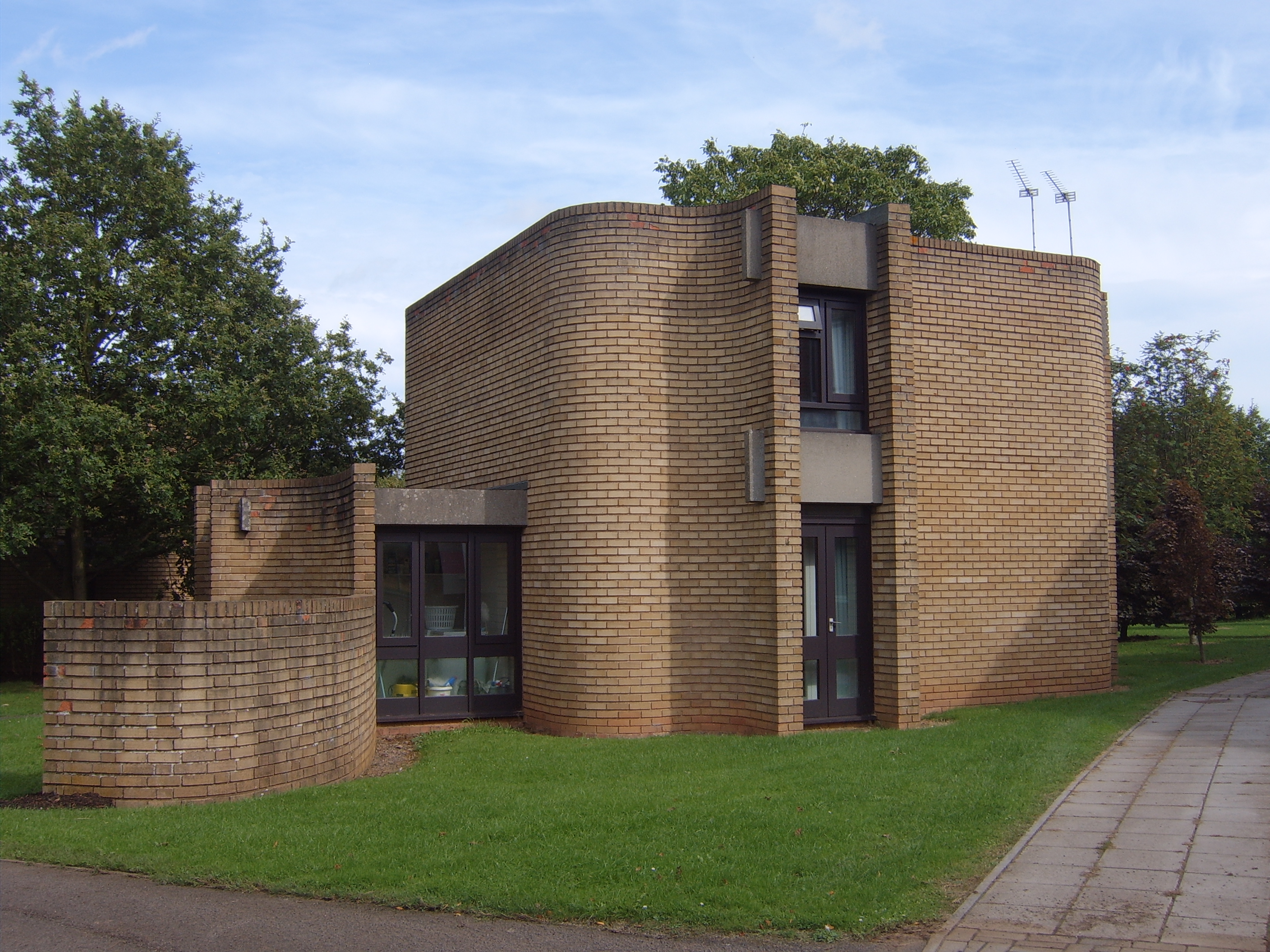
Houses for Visiting Mathematicians

William Gough Howell DFC ARA (1922 – 29 November 1974) was a British architect, the leading force in the firm of Howell Killick Partridge and Amis, and chair of the architecture department at Cambridge University from 1973 until his death the following year in a road accident.

He was the son of Charles Gough Howell, Attorney-General of Singapore from 1936 to 1942, and his Australian wife, Sidney Gretchen Innes-Noad. He was educated at Marlborough College, before joining the Royal Air Force in 1939. After the war, he studied architecture at Gonville and Caius College, Cambridge.

Howell designed the Houses for Visiting Mathematicians (also known as the Mathematics Research Centre houses), a set of five houses and two flats, built for academics attending mathematical conferences at the University of Warwick, built 1968 to 1969. They are now Grade II* listed buildings.

In 1951, Howell married fellow architect Gillian Margaret "Jill" Howell, née Sarson (1927–2000). Howell died in a car accident on 29 November 1974, near Leighton Buzzard, Bedfordshire.
