= La Pyramide (building) =

Building in Abidjan, Ivory Coast

- Aerial view of La Pyramide, Abidjan
- Interactive map of the La Pyramide area

General information
- Type: High-rise building
- Location: Plateau, Abidjan, Ivory Coast
- Coordinates: 5.3223°N 4.0164°W
- Construction started: 1968
- Completed: 1973
- Cost: 18 billion CFA francs

Design and construction
- Architect: Rinaldo Olivieri

La Pyramide is a high-rise building located in the Plateau area of Abidjan, the largest city in Ivory Coast. Construction of the building began in 1968 and was completed in 1973. It was designed by Italian architect Rinaldo Olivieri who aimed to capture the activity of an African market in an urban setting.

It is one of the most famous buildings in Abidjan for its distinctive architecture and one of the first high-rise buildings built in the Plateau area at the time of the Ivorian miracle. Expats and other Ivorian elite from Abidjan resided in the body of the pyramid, while the ground floor was reserved for shops and boutiques.

When it was deserted at the onset of political troubles and because of its inefficient ratio of rentable space to circulation, the building deteriorated considerably from the 1990s and became dangerous during the 2000s. A program for complete renovation of La Pyramide was announced by the Ivorian government in 2011, through an offer of public-private partnership. The cost of the renovation is expected to be around 18 billion CFA francs and aims to make the Pyramide a tourist attraction. To date actual renovation are yet to be carried out.

== See also ==
- List of Brutalist structures
