= Houses for Visiting Mathematicians =

Academic accommodation in Coventry, England

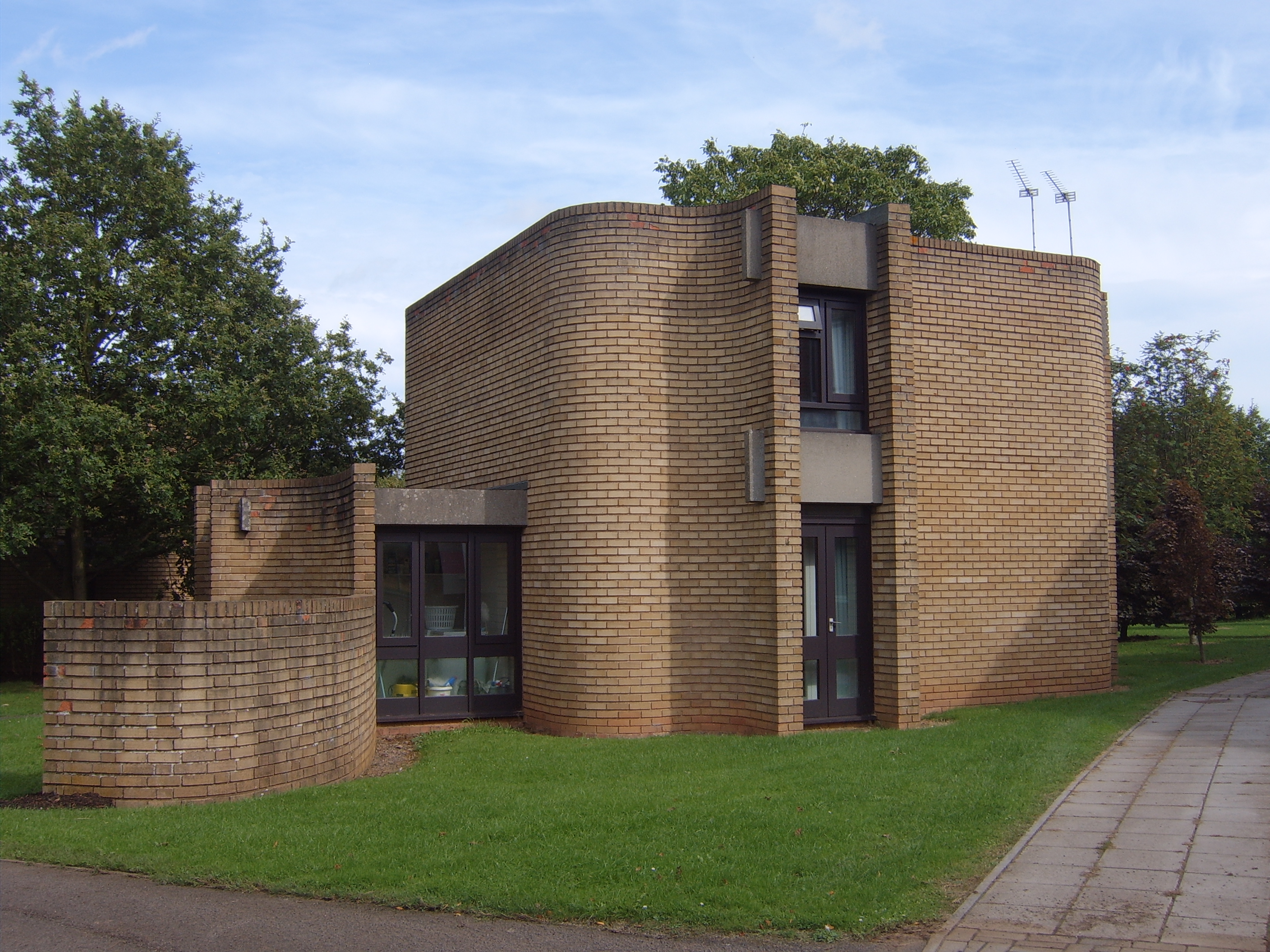
- One of the houses, located on Warwick University's Gibbet Hill campus
- Interactive map of the Houses for Visiting Mathematicians area

General information
- Location: Warwick University, Gibbet Hill Campus, Coventry, England
- Coordinates: 52.37543°N 1.55051°W
- Construction started: 1968
- Completed: 1969
- Opened: June 1969

Design and construction
- Architect: Bill Howell
- Architecture firm: Howell, Killick, Partridge and Amis
- Awards: RIBA Architecture Award (1970)

The Houses for Visiting Mathematicians (also known as the Mathematics Research Centre houses) are a set of five houses and two flats, built for academics attending mathematical conferences at the University of Warwick.

The buildings are Grade II* listed and were built between 1968 and 1969 to the design of architect Bill Howell and were opened in June of that year by then Vice-Chancellor Jack Butterworth, Sir Christopher Zeeman and Bill Howell. Their construction was supported by a £50,000 grant from the Nuffield Foundation. In 1970, they received the RIBA Architecture Award.

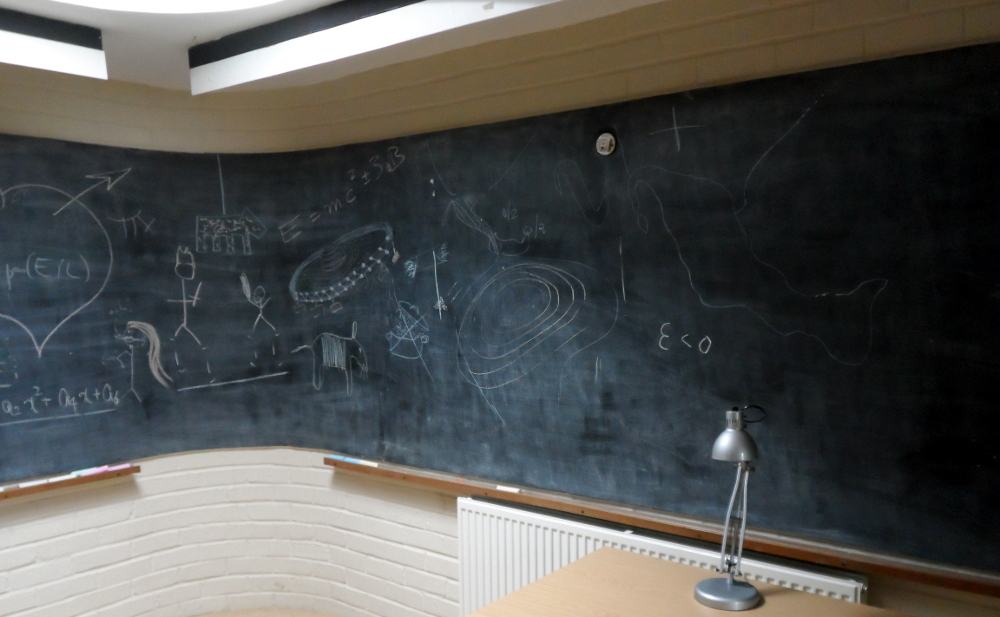
Blackboard in main study bedroom.

The houses comprise a combined living room/kitchen and large study bedroom on the ground floor, and smaller study bedrooms and a bathroom on the first floor. The curved walls of the downstairs study are lined with blackboards, built to the specification that they should be high enough for the mathematician to work but also "low enough for small children to use the bottom bit."

== See also ==
- Grade II* listed buildings in Coventry
