= Albert Schickedanz =

Austro-Hungarian architect and painter

Albert Schickedanz (or Schikedanz) (October 14, 1846 – July 11, 1915) was an Austro-Hungarian architect and painter in the Eclectic style.

Schickedanz was born in Biala, Kingdom of Galicia and Lodomeria, to an ethnic German family. He studied at his home town and at Käsmark (now Kežmarok, Slovakia).

After studying in Karlsruhe and Vienna, Schickedanz worked beside the Hungarian architect Miklós Ybl. He designed the Millennium memorial (1897–1905), the building of the Museum of Fine Arts (1899–1907) and the Palace of Art (1905) in Budapest; the latter are located opposite each other on the gigantic Heroes' Square at the end of Andrássy Avenue.

Schickedanz also designed the plinth of the memorial of Count Lajos Batthyány in Kerepesi Cemetery and the plinthes of the statues of Ferenc Deák and János Arany. He was also active in painting and applied art. Between 1880 and 1902, he taught at the School of Applied Arts, Budapest. His townscapes are kept in the Budapest History Museum.
