= Our Lady Help of Christians Church, Tile Cross =

Church of Our Lady Help of Christians
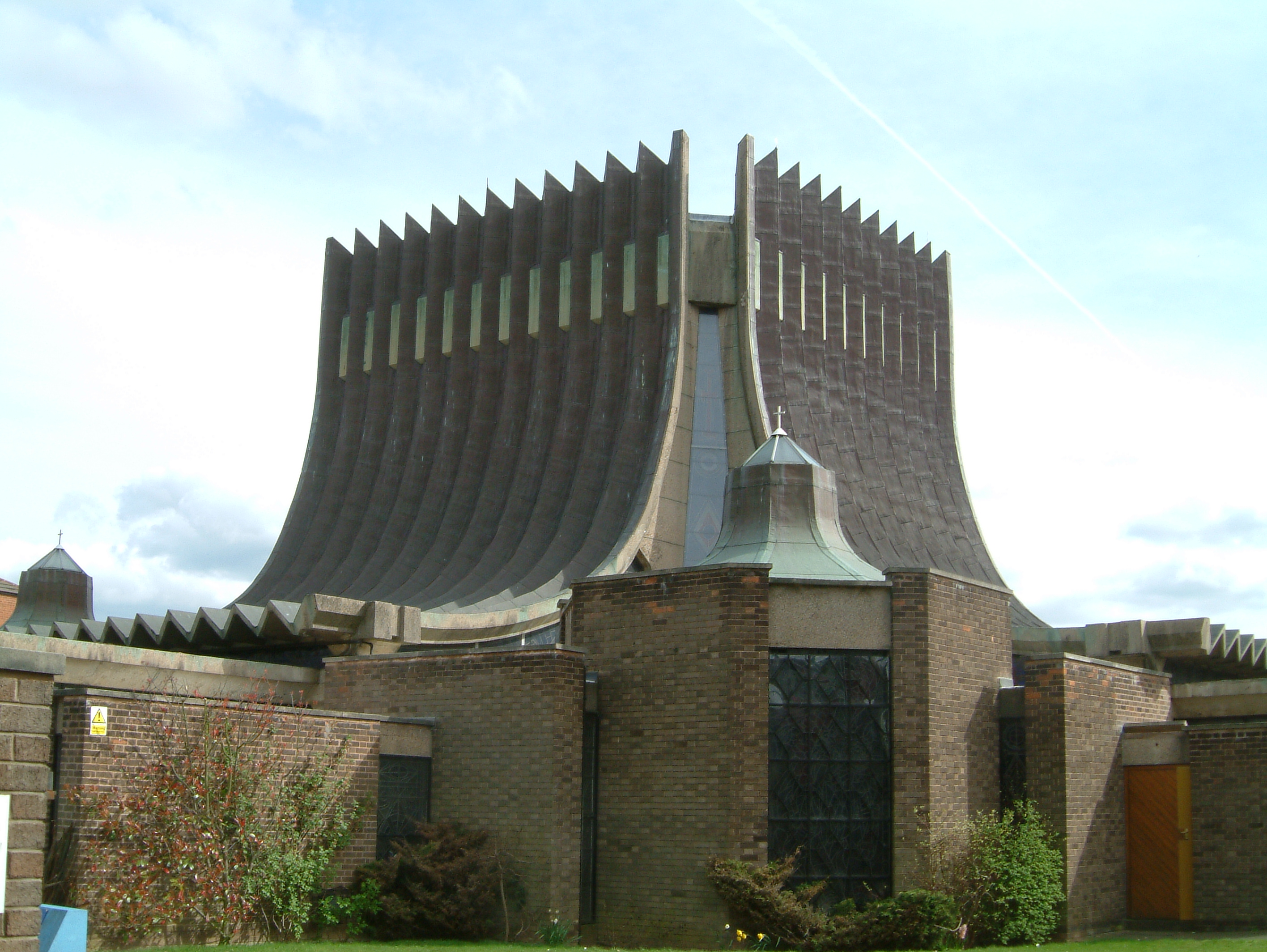
- Church of Our Lady Help of Christians
- 52°28′50.08″N 1°46′16.28″W
- OS grid reference: SP 15637 86988
- Location: East Medway, Tile Cross, Birmingham
- Country: England
- Denomination: Roman Catholic

History
- Status: Church

Architecture
- Heritage designation: Grade II* listed
- Architect: Richard Gilbert Scott
- Style: Brutalist
- Groundbreaking: 1966
- Completed: 1967

Administration
- Diocese: Archdiocese of Birmingham
- Deanery: Birmingham East

Clergy
- Priest: Father Anthony Pham-Tri-Van

Listed Building – Grade II*
- Designated: 18 February 1999
- Reference no.: 1245546

Our Lady Help of Christians is a Grade II* listed Catholic church in Tile Cross, Birmingham. Built in 1966–67 and designed by Richard Gilbert Scott of Giles Scott, Son and Partner. The church is active with Sunday mass at 09:30 and 17:00. The nearby Our Lady's Catholic Primary School is associated with the church.

== Architecture ==
The church was designed by Richard Gilbert Scott, son of renowned architect Giles Gilbert Scott. It has a subtly polygonal T-shaped plan which allows a forward altar surrounded by the congregation. Above the altar the roof is partly formed by extraordinary curved serrated ribbed trusses of reinforced concrete, faced externally with copper cladding. Inside the stained glass is by John Chrestien.

The church demonstrates many of the ideas enshrined in De Sacra Liturgia of 1963 and the Catholic Church's pronouncements on forward altars and centralised planning made in 1964, but it is no mere auditorium of worship; every element is carefully conceived, demonstrating and integration of architecture, engineering and stained glass art.

The building featured in the book, 100 Buildings, 100 Years, published by the Twentieth Century Society in 2014.

== Organ ==
The church has a Rowntree & Brennan II Box Organ dating from 1975. A specification of the organ can be found on the National Pipe Organ Register.
