= Richard Gilbert Scott =

British architect (1923–2017)

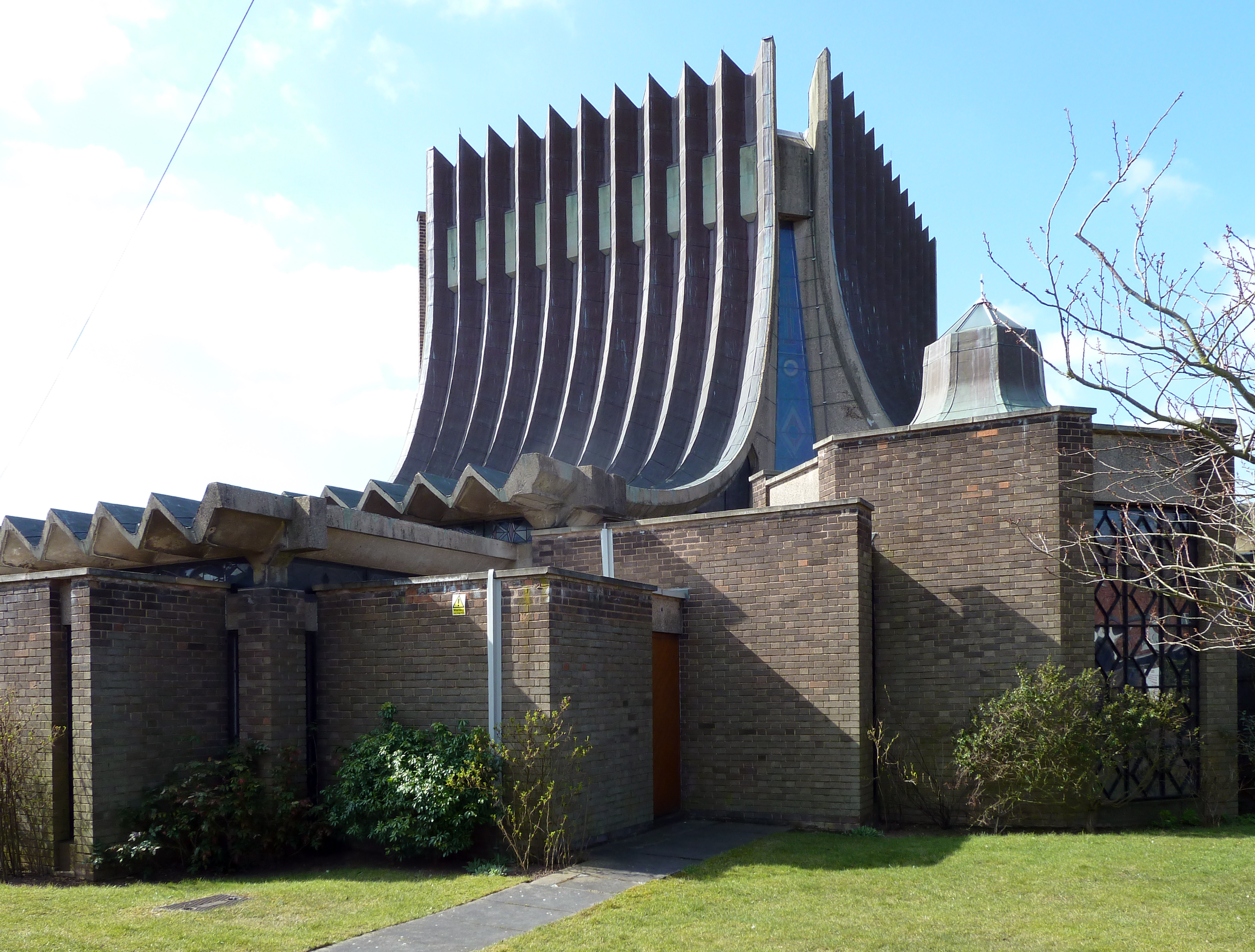
- Our Lady Help of Christians Church, Tile Cross
- Born: 12 December 1923; London, England
- Died: 1 July 2017 (aged 93)
- Education: The Bartlett
- Occupation: Architect
- Spouse: Eline Marie Brodin
- Children: Nicholas Scott and three daughters
- Parent(s): Giles Gilbert Scott and Louise née Hughes
- Practice: Sir Giles Scott, Son & Partner
- Buildings: Our Lady Help of Christians Church, Tile Cross, Birmingham
- Projects: Extensions to Guildhall Library, City of London

Richard Gilbert Scott (12 December 1923 – 1 July 2017) was a British architect, born in London, the son of Giles Gilbert Scott and great-grandson of the great Gothic Revival architect George Gilbert Scott. He was educated at Harrow, Charterhouse School, Bartlett School of Architecture London University, and Regent Street Polytechnic School of Architecture.

Scott was the designer of three churches which have been given the status of Grade II listed buildings: St Mark's Church, Biggin Hill, the Our Lady Help of Christians Church, Tile Cross, Birmingham and the Church of St Thomas More, Sheldon, also in Birmingham.

Scott worked for the family firm, retiring in 1999. Amongst other works he was responsible for the West Wing of the Guildhall, London (1974) and the Guildhall Art Gallery 1999. Both buildings contrast with the Gothic architecture of the Guildhall (which his father was in charge of restoring after World War Two), the West Wing being in a modernist tradition, and the Art Gallery being in the post-modern tradition.

== Works ==
A comprehensive list of Richard Gilbert Scott's designs:

- Rockware Glass, Greenford – office extension (1956–58)
- St Mark's Church, Biggin Hill (1957–59)
- Cotts House, City of London – office building (1960–62)
- National Central Library & Library Association, London WC1 – offices and book stack (1960–63)
- Reconstruction plan around London Guildhall, (phases 1–5) (1960–65)
- Whitelands College, Putney – teaching and hostel buildings (1961–1965)
- Forth Road Bridge and subsidiary bridges: Consultant Architect (1964–67)
- Our Lady Help of Christians Church, Tile Cross, Birmingham (1966–67), Grade II listed
- Church of St Thomas More, Sheldon, Birmingham (1968–69)
- Exhibition Hall, temporary Magistrates' Courts and underground car park, Guildhall, London (1968–70)
- Restoration of Dance Porch, and installation of new gallery, London Guildhall (1969–71)
- Feasibility study for 5 new Boys' Houses, Charterhouse School, Godalming, Surrey (1969–71)
- Consultant Architect for travolator, Bank Station, London Underground (1970)
- Office building for Guildhall Library, ambulatory, members' accommodation, and Alderman's Court, Guildhall, London (1971–76)
- Restoration of West Crypt and alteration of west window, Guildhall, London (1974–75)
- 7 new Boys' Houses (60 boarders in each) and Dining Block seating 500, and conversion of museum to classrooms, Charterhouse School (1975–78)
- Refurbishment of Guildhall House, London EC2 (office block) (1975–76)
- Consultant Architect for Redhaugh Road Bridge, Newcastle upon Tyne (1975)
- Conversion into flats of 1–5 Shepherds Place, Mayfair, London W1 (1977–78)
- School of Technology, Music School, and Ben Travers Theatre, Charterhouse School (1978–83)
- Conversion of 'Big School' to theatre, and alteration of 4 boys' residential Houses Eastbourne College (1982–83)
- New HQ building for Blue Circle Industries, plc, at Aldermaston, Berkshire (1983–85)
- Women students' building, Padworth College, Berks (1985–88)
- New Guildhall Art Gallery and East Ambulatory, together with new layout of Guildhall Yard and retention of remains of London's Roman Amphitheatre, discovered beneath the site (1989–99)
- Meg's Cottage (own house) in North Norfolk (1996)
