= Luis de Garrido =

Spanish architect (born 1967)

- Born: Luis de Garrido Talavera; 1967 (age 58–59)
- Education: Technical University of Valencia; Polytechnic University of Catalonia
- Occupation: Architect
- Website: www.luisdegarrido.com

Luis de Garrido Talavera (born 1967) is a Spanish architect working in sustainable architecture in Spain.

== Biography ==
Luis de Garrido studied architecture at the UPV (4951)Polytechnic University of Valencia where he graduated with a doctorate. He also completed a master's degree in Urban Design at the (Polytechnic University of Catalonia).

He has taught a range of subjects at the information technology faculty at the Polytechnic University of Valencia (UPV), the information technology faculty at the Polytechnic University of Catalonia (UPC), and the school of telecommunications. Universitat Ramón Llull (URL), Barcelona, at the architectural school at the Polytechnic University of Valencia (UPV) and the architectural school at the Polytechnic University of Catalonia (UPC).

Luis de Garrido directs an architectural firm "Luis De Garrido Architects", in Valencia, Spain, which is involved in green architecture. He has designed houses for celebrities including supermodel Naomi Campbell and footballer Lionel Messi.
