= 1764 in architecture =

The year 1764 in architecture involved some significant events.

== Events ==
- Robert Adam's Ruins of the Palace of the Emperor Diocletian at Spalatro in Dalmatia published.
- Heidelberg Castle (Holy Roman Empire, Germany) is again burned and destroyed by a thunderbolt.

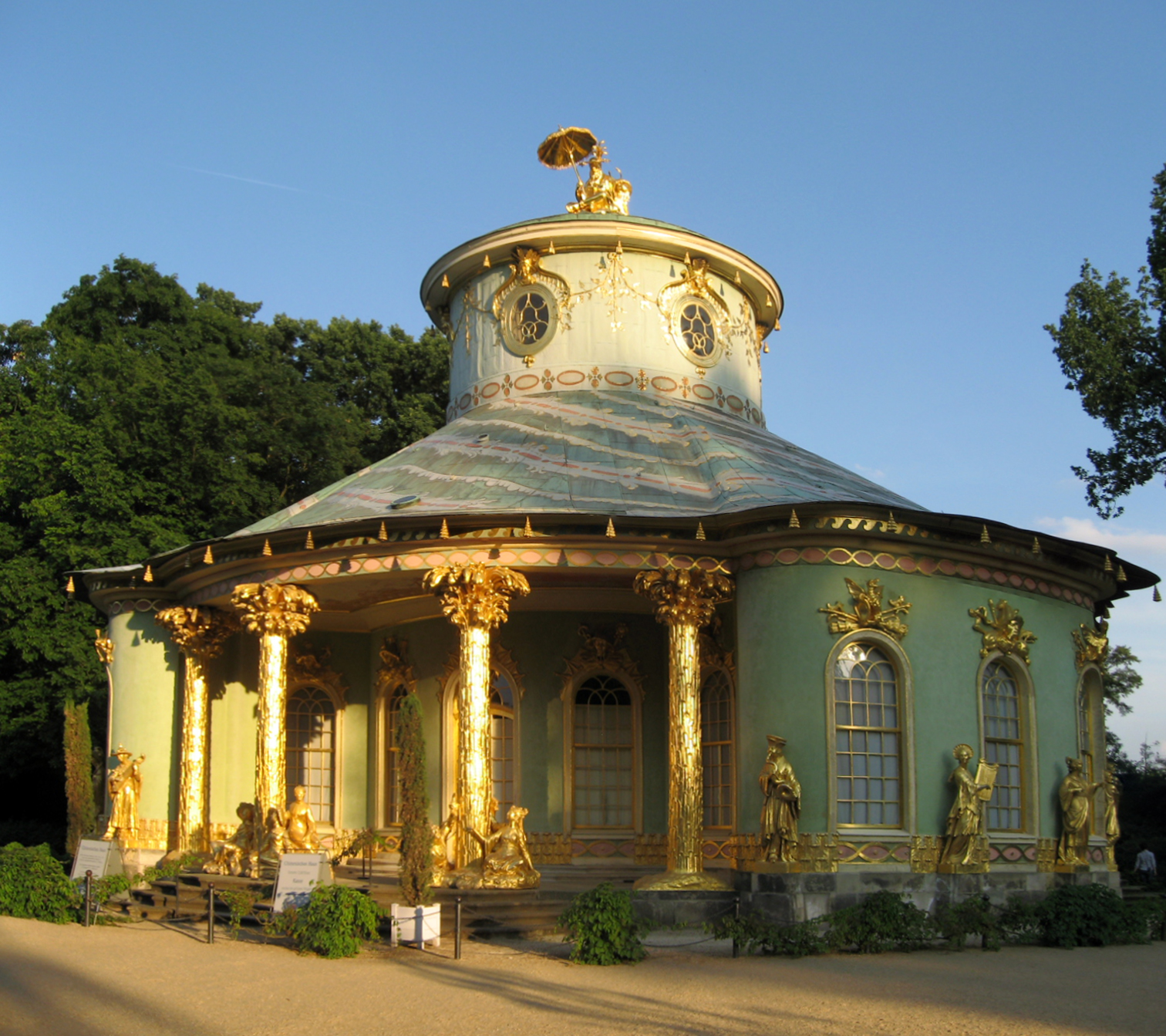
Chinese House (Potsdam): European chinoiserie

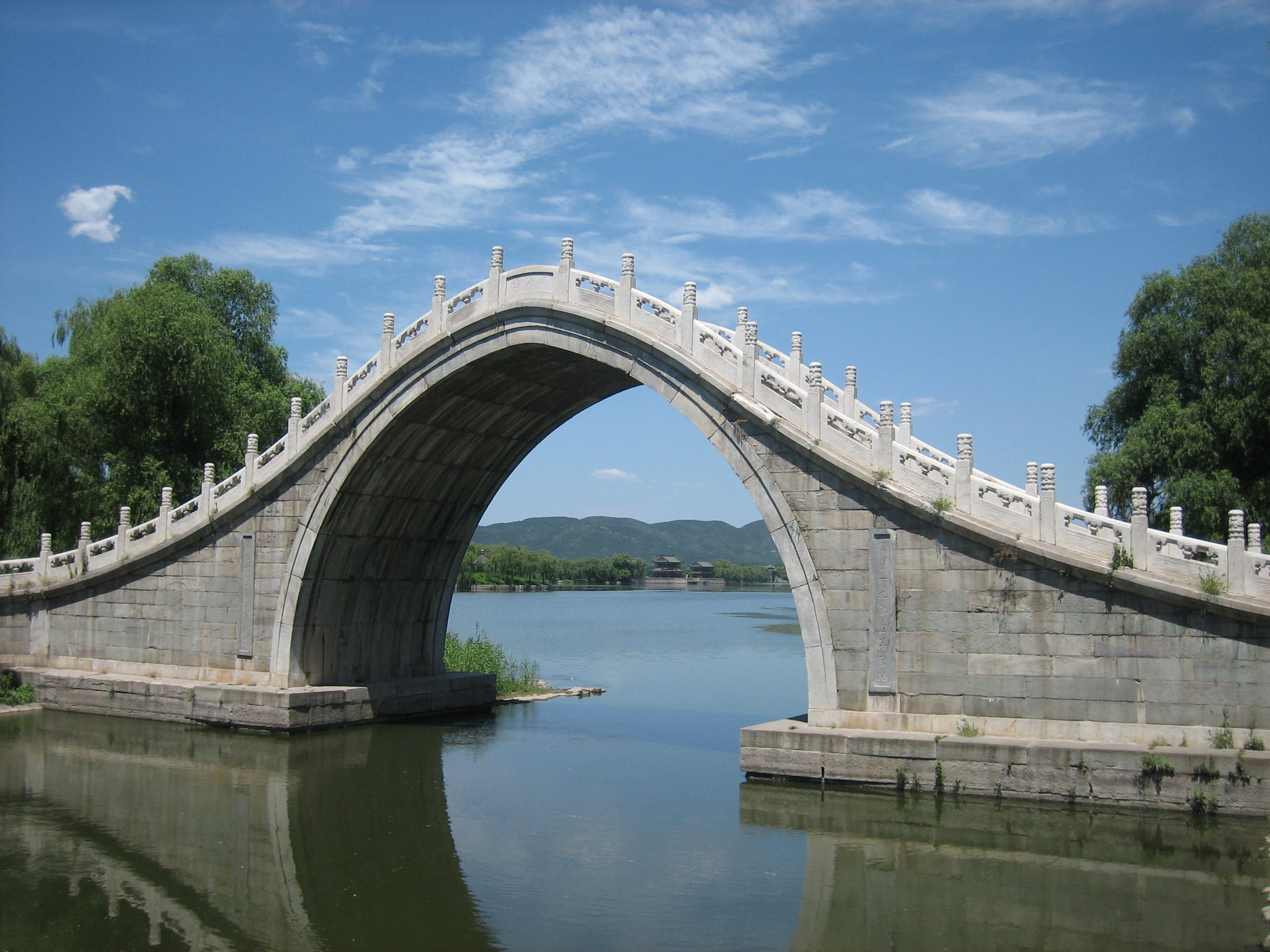
Jade Belt Bridge (Beijing)

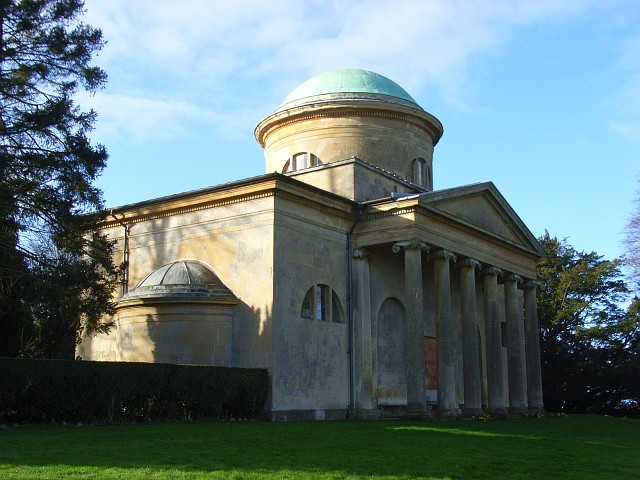
All Saints Church, Nuneham Courtenay

== Buildings and structures ==
=== Buildings ===
- Exeter Synagogue (England) is dedicated.
- New All Saints Church, Nuneham Courtenay, Oxfordshire, England, designed by Simon Harcourt, 1st Earl Harcourt, with James "Athenian" Stuart, is built.
- Church of St. Stephen, Borovo in Serbia is completed.
- Iglesia Mayor de San Pedro y San Pablo in San Fernando, Spain, is consecrated.
- Bell tower of Church of Nuestra Señora de la Asunción (Valdemoro) in Spain is completed.
- Saint John the Baptist Church, Târgu Mureș in the Habsburg Empire, designed by Jesuit Valentin Scherzer, is built.
- Church of the Intercession at Kizhi Pogost in Karelia is rebuilt.
- Harmandir Sahib in Amritsar, Punjab, is rebuilt.
- Custom House, Lancaster, England is designed by Richard Gillow in the Palladian style.
- Holkham Hall, England, is completed in the Palladian style by William Kent after thirty years of building work.
- The Yellow Palace, Copenhagen, is completed by Nicolas-Henri Jardin for the timber merchant H. F. Bargum. It later becomes a residence of the Danish royal family.
- Château du Prada in France, designed by Victor Louis, is built.
- The Chinese House in Sanssouci Park, Potsdam (Prussia), designed by Johann Gottfried Büring, is completed.
- Jade Belt Bridge in grounds of Summer Palace, Beijing (Qing dynasty China) is completed.
- Sandy Hook Light, New Jersey, is designed and built by Isaac Conro.
- Construction work begins on the Theatre Royal, Bristol, England, designed by James Paty.
- Remodelling of Łazienki Palace in Warsaw by Domenico Merlini is begun (completed 1795).

== Births ==
- May 1 – Benjamin Latrobe, British-born American neoclassical architect best known for the United States Capitol (died 1820)
- July 9 – Louis-Pierre Baltard, French architect and engraver (died 1846)
- August 22 – Charles Percier, French neoclassical architect, interior decorator and designer (died 1838)

== Deaths ==
- August 7 – James Burrough, English academic, antiquary and amateur architect (born 1691)
- Unknown – Giovanni Antonio Scalfarotto, Venetian architect (born c.1700)
