= 1955 in architecture =

The year 1955 in architecture involved some significant architectural events and new buildings.

== Events ==
- June – Outrage, a special issue of Architectural Review condemning the areas of British cities failed by urban planning, establishes the reputation of Ian Nairn as an architectural critic.
- December – Reyner Banham introduces the term "New Brutalism" into English print, writing in Architectural Review.
- Chinese American architect I. M. Pei establishes the architectural practice I. M. Pei & Associates with Eason H. Leonard and Henry N. Cobb in New York City.
- German architect Josef Bieling establishes the architectural practice Architekturbüro Josef Bieling in his hometown Kassel.

== Buildings and structures ==
Notre Dame du Haut

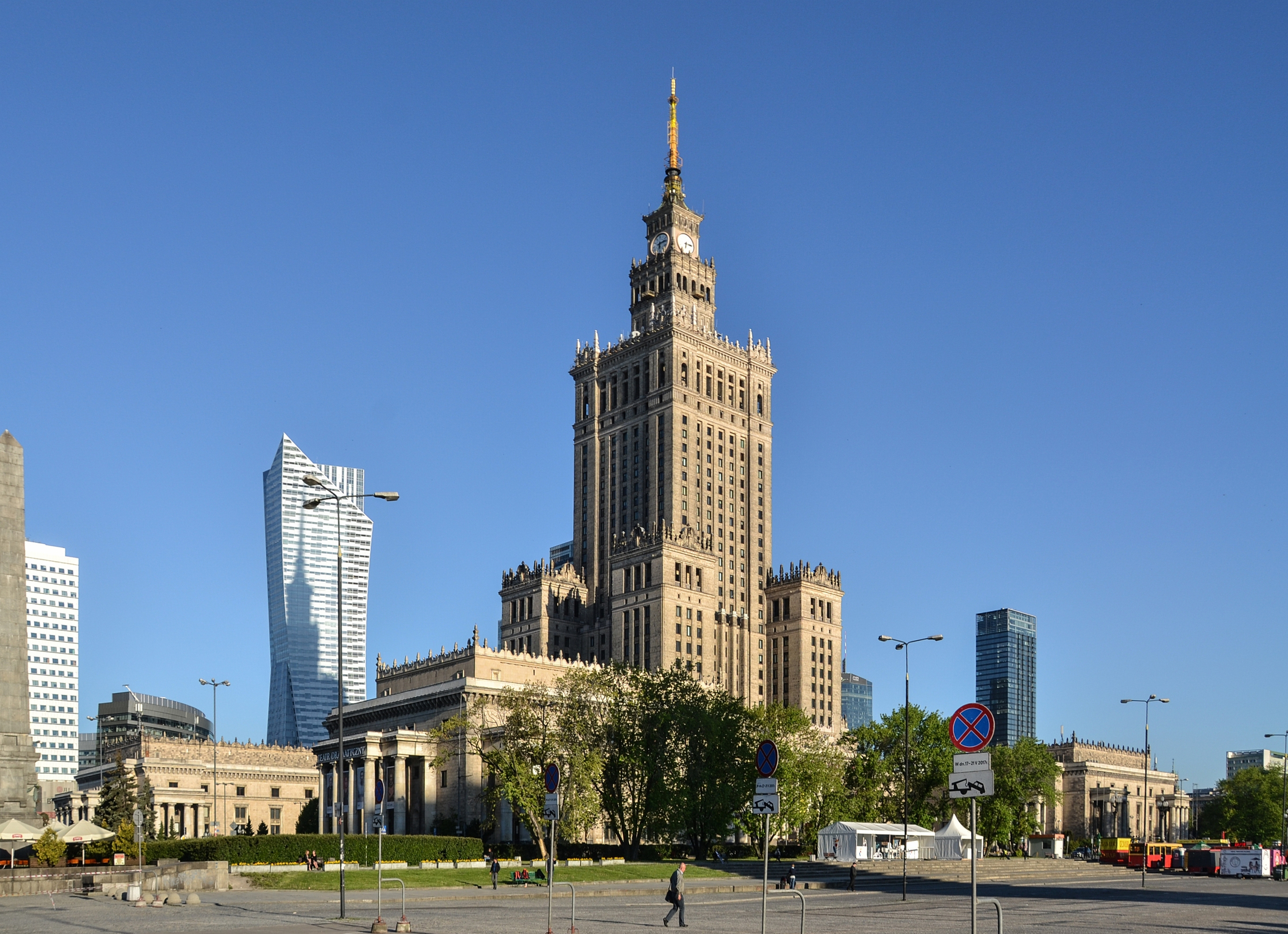
The Palace of Culture and Science in Warsaw

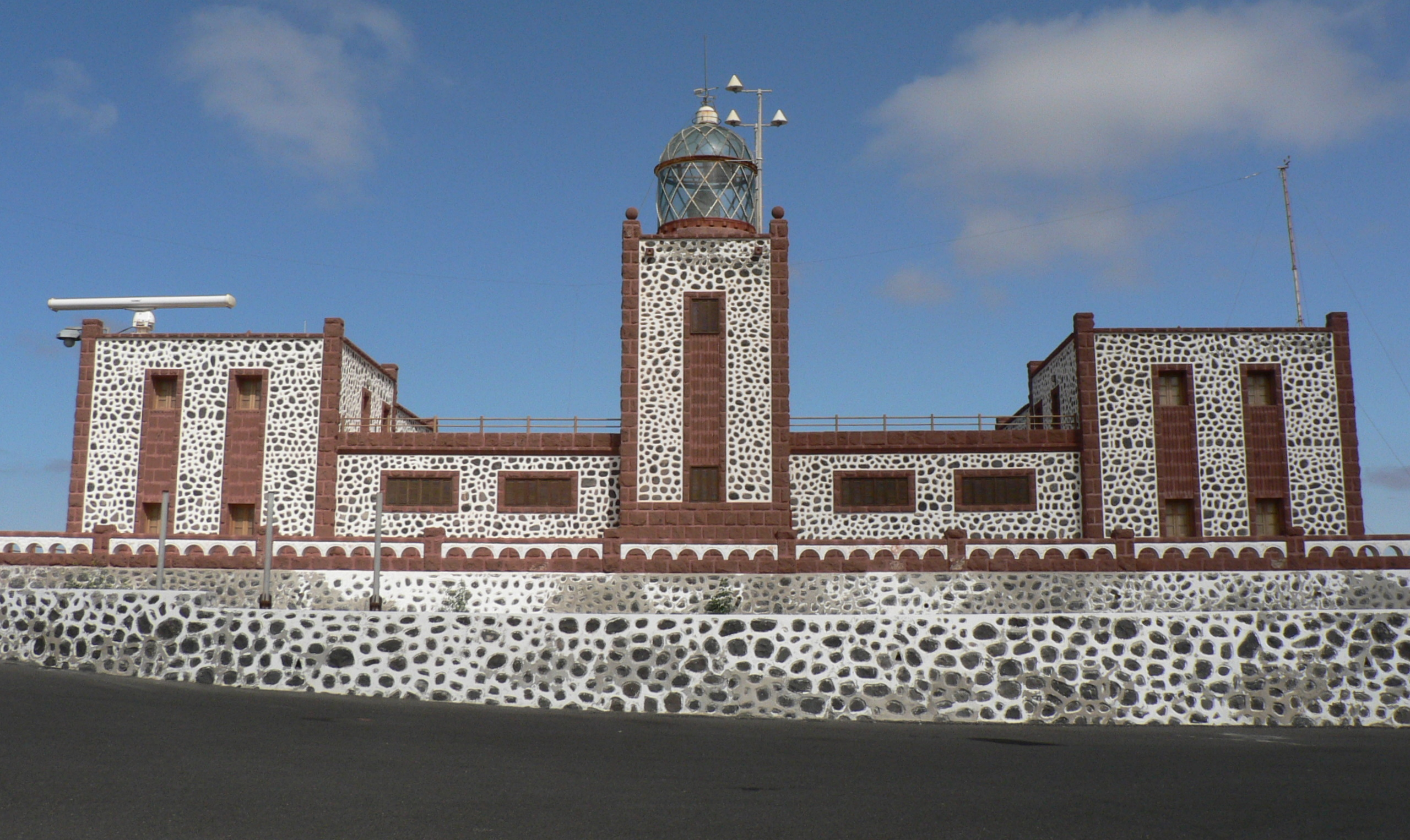
Punta La Entallada Lighthouse on Fuerteventura, Canary Islands, Spain

=== Buildings opened ===
- June 25 – Notre Dame du Haut in Ronchamp, France, designed by Le Corbusier, is dedicated.
- July 22 – Palace of Culture and Science in Warsaw, the tallest building in Poland (1955–present) and the second tallest in Europe (1955–1990), designed by Lev Rudnev.
- August – Hiroshima Peace Memorial Museum, Japan, designed by Kenzō Tange.

=== Buildings completed ===
- February – Bavinger House in Norman, Oklahoma, United States, the best-known building designed by Bruce Goff.
- MIT Chapel and Kresge Auditorium at Massachusetts Institute of Technology, Cambridge, Massachusetts, designed by Eero Saarinen.
- Chapel of Trinity College, Toronto, designed by Giles Gilbert Scott.
- Dominus Flevit Church, Jerusalem, designed by Antonio Barluzzi.
- Restoration following bomb damage at Lambeth Palace in London, by Seely & Paget.
- Reconstructed Kinkaku-ji temple in Kyoto, Japan.
- Chandigarh High Court (Palace of Justice), Chandigarh Capitol Complex, India, designed by Le Corbusier.
- Southern Alberta Jubilee Auditorium in Calgary, Alberta.
- Northern Alberta Jubilee Auditorium in Edmonton, Alberta.
- Punta La Entallada Lighthouse on Fuerteventura, Canary Islands, designed by Carlos Alcon.
- Fundació Pilar y Joan Miró in Palma, Majorca, designed by Josep Lluís Sert.
- Tate & Lyle sugar silo, Liverpool, England.
- Casa Antonio Gálvez, Mexico City, designed by Luis Barragán.
- House Fox, Worcester, Western Cape, South Africa, designed by Revel Fox.
- Houses for self at 7 Gibraltar Hill and for E. W. Scorer, both in Lincoln, England, designed by Sam Scorer.
- House for John Womersley at Farnley Tyas, Yorkshire, England, designed by Peter Womersley.
- "Hermit's Castle", Achmelvich, Scotland, designed by David Scott.

== Awards ==
- AIA Gold Medal – Willem Marinus Dudok.
- RIBA Royal Gold Medal – John Murray Easton.
- Grand Prix de Rome, architecture – Ngô Viết Thụ.

== Births ==
- February 12 – Enric Miralles, Spanish Catalan architect (died 2000)
- April 14 – Robert Couturier, French architect and interior designer, designer of Cuixmala
- July 2 – Francine Houben, Dutch architect
- August 2 – Anne Lacaton, French architect
- November 17 – Amanda Levete, British architect
- date unknown
  - Miroslav Grčev, Macedonian architect and graphic designer
  - Alan Powers, British modern architecture and design historian

== Deaths ==
- February 7 – Carl Rubin, Galician-born Israeli International Style architect (born 1899)
- April 16 – George Howe, American International Style architect and educator (born 1886)
- August 6 – Dominikus Böhm, German church architect (born 1880)
- November 29 – Rene Paul Chambellan, American architectural sculptor (born 1893)
