= 1846 in architecture =

The year 1846 in architecture involved some significant architectural events and new buildings.

== Events ==
- December 23 – The Nizamat Imambara, in Murshidabad, India built by Nawab Siraj ud-Daulah, having been partially burnt down in 1842, is completely destroyed in another fire.

== Buildings and structures ==
=== Buildings opened ===
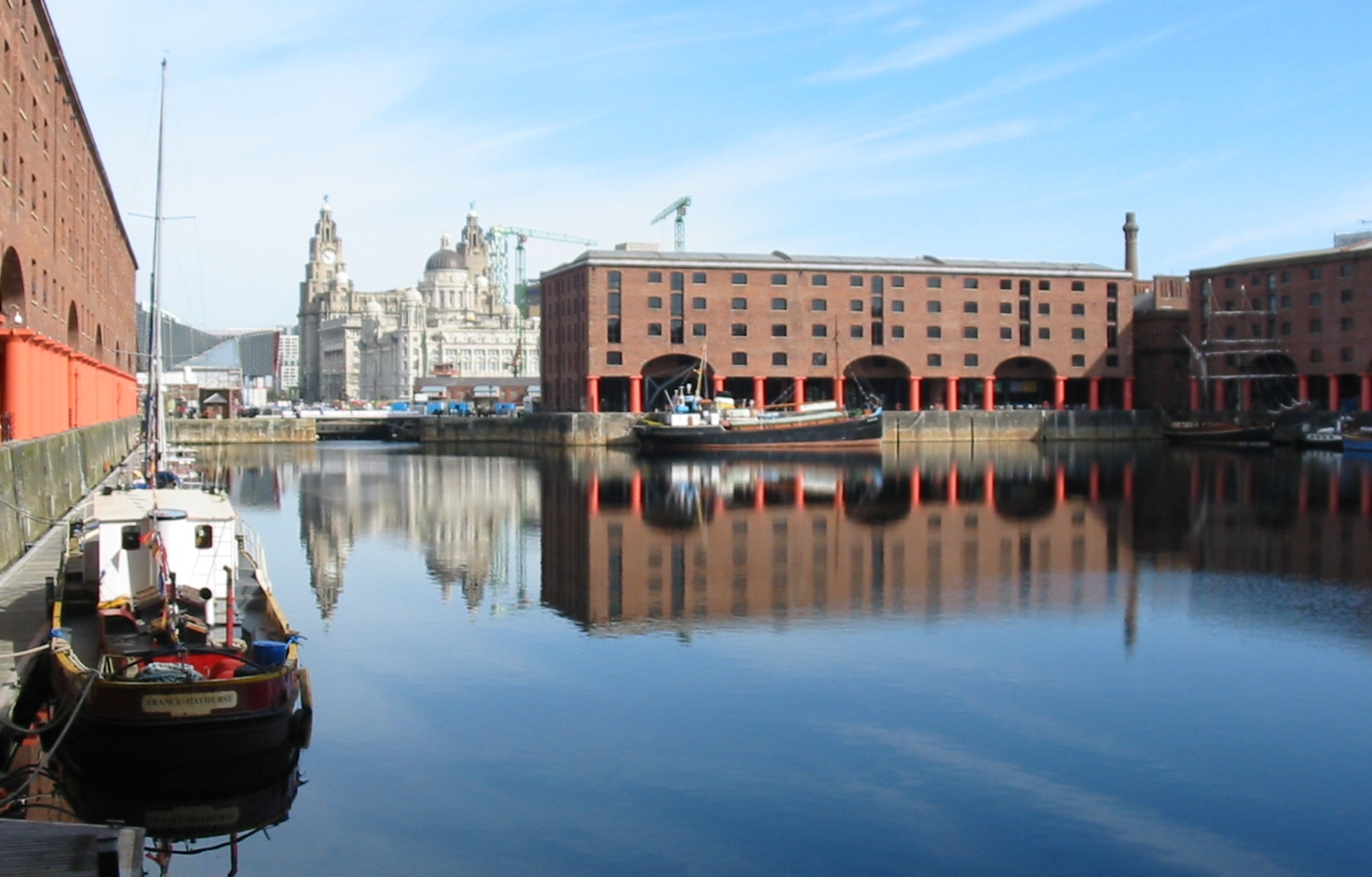
Albert Dock in Liverpool, England

- January 16 – Shree Govindajee Temple in Imphal, Manipur, commissioned by Raja Nara Singh.
- March 7 – Grace Church (Manhattan), New York City, United States, designed by James Renwick Jr., is consecrated.
- May 12 – Our Lady of Lebanon Maronite Cathedral (Brooklyn) holds its first service.
- May 21 – Trinity Church (Manhattan) in Wall Street, New York City, designed by Richard Upjohn, is consecrated.
- July 30 – Albert Dock in Liverpool, England, officially opened by Prince Albert, husband of Queen Victoria.
- August 4 – Dublin Kingsbridge railway station in Ireland, designed by Sancton Wood.
- August 31 – St Giles' Catholic Church, Cheadle in England, designed by Augustus Pugin, is consecrated.
- September 1 – Pasig River Light, the first lighthouse erected in the Philippines, is lit.
- September 22 – Lancaster Castle railway station in England, designed by William Tite.
- December 24 – Needham, Stowmarket and Thurston railway stations in Suffolk, England, designed by Frederick Barnes (station buildings completed 1847/9).

=== Buildings completed ===
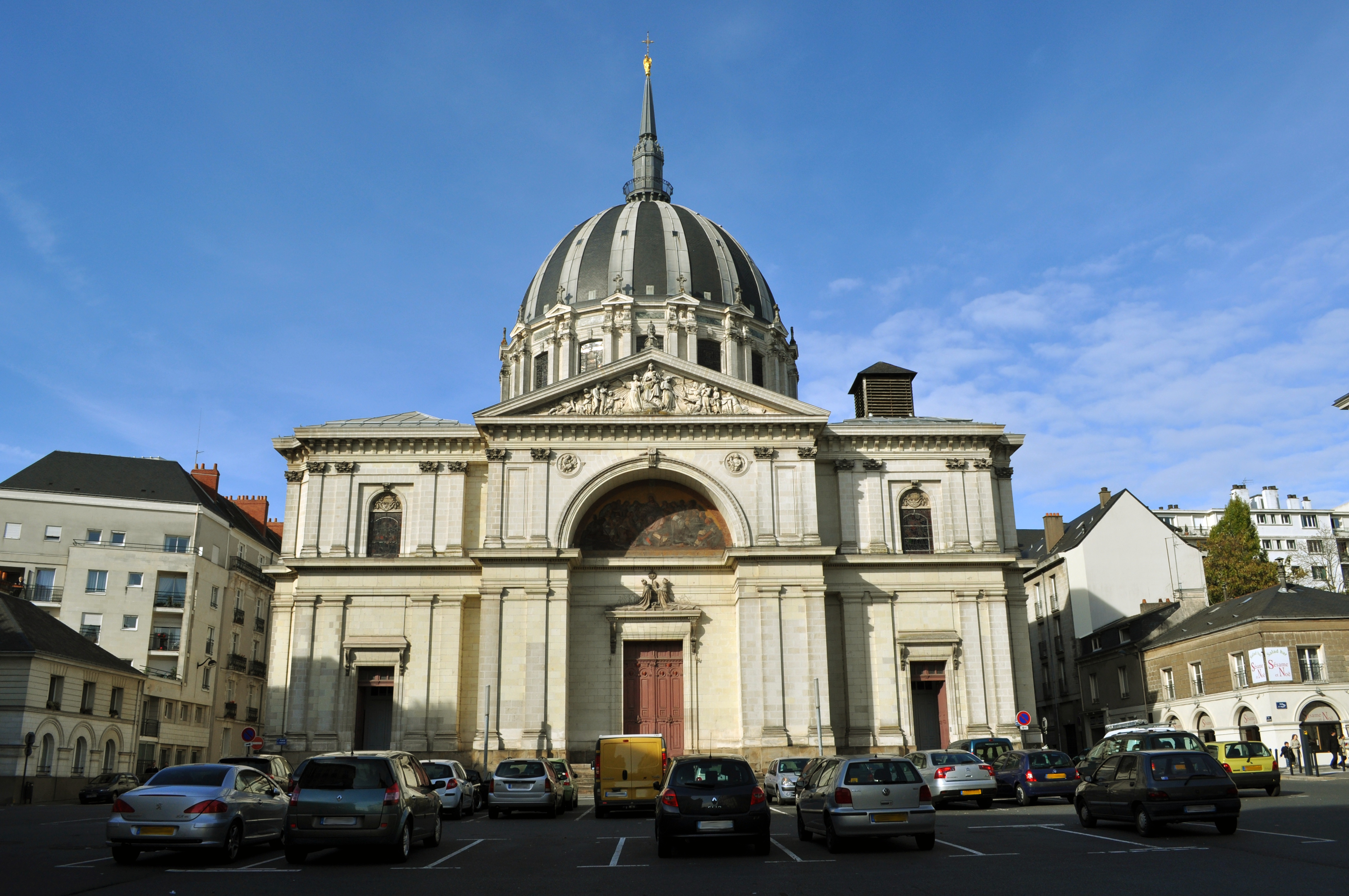
Notre-Dame de Bon-Port in Nantes, France

- June — Grace Church, Providence, Rhode Island, designed by Richard Upjohn, is completed (except for the spire, which was not finished until 1860).
- Macau Government House, built as a private home by Macanese architect Thomaz de Aquino.
- Murney Tower, Kingston, Ontario, Canada.
- Newstead House, Brisbane, Australia.
- Notre-Dame de Bon-Port, Nantes, France, designed by Seheult and Joseph-Fleury Chenantais.
- Llandinam Bridge in Montgomeryshire, Wales, designed by Thomas Penson.

== Awards ==
- Grand Prix de Rome, architecture: Alfred-Nicolas Normand.

== Births ==
- September 4 – Daniel Burnham, American architect and urban designer (died 1912)
- James E. Ware, American architect, originator of the "dumbbell plan" for New York City tenements (died 1918)

== Deaths ==
- January 22 – Louis Baltard, French architect and engraver (born 1764)
