= 1880 in architecture =

The year 1880 in architecture involved some significant architectural events and new buildings.

== Buildings and structures ==
=== Buildings ===
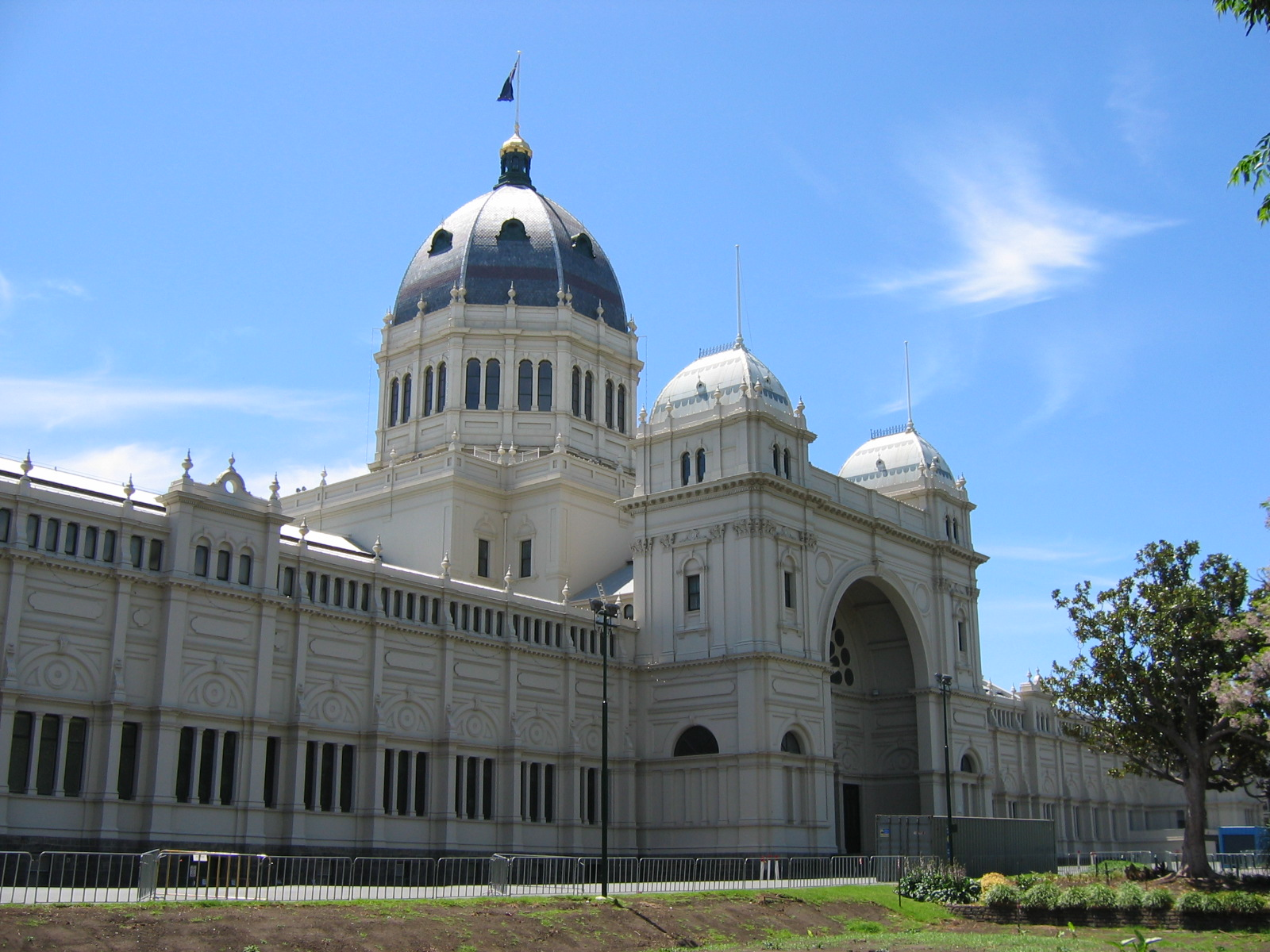
Royal Exhibition Building

- August 14 – Cologne Cathedral in Cologne, Germany, is completed after 632 years.
- Berlin Anhalter Bahnhof (railway station) in Berlin, Germany, rebuilt by Franz Heinrich Schwechten, is completed.
- Manchester Central railway station in Manchester, England is completed.
- Royal Exhibition Building, Melbourne is completed.
- Yıldız Palace, Istanbul, Turkey, is built.
- Bathing Ghat, Bulandshahr, India, is completed.

== Awards ==
- RIBA Royal Gold Medal – John Loughborough Pearson.
- Grand Prix de Rome, architecture: Louis Girault.

== Births ==
- April 1 – Louis Laybourne Smith – Australian architect (died 1965)
- April 9 – Jan Letzel, Czech architect (died 1925)
- May 4 – Bruno Taut, German architect and urban planner (died 1938)
- May 19 – Albert Richardson, English architect, writer, and professor of architecture (died 1964)
- May 25 – Eižens Laube, Latvian architect (died 1967)
- June 15 – Aymar Embury II, American architect (died 1966)
- October 23 – Dominikus Böhm, German church architect (died 1955)
- November 9 – Giles Gilbert Scott, English architect, son of George Gilbert Scott, Jr. (died 1960)

== Deaths ==
- January 27 – Edward Middleton Barry, English architect (born 1830)
- May 25 – Richard Lane, English architect (born 1795)
- August 22 – Benjamin Ferrey, English architect (born 1810)

== Developments ==
- Margaret Hicks became the first woman to graduate from an architecture course at an American university.
