= Mary L. Page =

American architect (1849–1921)

Mary Louisa Page
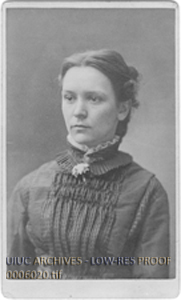
- Mary L. Page circa 1878
- Born: 1849
- Died: 1921 (aged 71–72)
- Occupation: Architect

Mary Louisa Page (1849–1921) was the first American woman to graduate with an accredited architecture degree in the United States. In 1878, she graduated from the University of Illinois at Urbana Champaign with a Bachelor of Science in Architecture. She was one of 89 female students on campus at the time, out of an undergraduate student body of 369. Though Mary Louisa was one of several women on campus, she was the only woman in her architecture classes. The year following Mary Page's graduation, Margaret Hicks became the second female architecture graduate when she graduated from Cornell University.

== Early life and education ==
Mary L. Page attended the University of Illinois from 1874 to 1878, graduating with a B.S. in architecture.

Following graduation, Mary Louisa established a drafting, blueprint, and abstracting service company—Whitman & Page—with classmate Robert Farwell Whitman in 1887. Choosing a male partner was undoubtedly strategic, helping to put customers at ease with a female architect.

In 1892, she was a secretary for the Capital City Abstract & Title Insurance Company headed by Millard Lemon. By early 1901, Mary Louisa was considered an expert in architecture, when an article titled “Occupations of Women: What the Field of Architecture Offers to the Well Trained, Practical Woman” appeared in the New York Daily Tribune.

Over the years, Mary Louisa held a variety of positions. She served as a teacher in Washington State, as President of the Women's Christian Temperance Union in Washington (1895–1900), and as an instructor at Blue Printing and Abstracting in Olympia, Washington (Alumni Register, 1913, Record Series 11/1/828). She published the article “A Sketch from Life” appeared in the North-west Journal of Education.

In 1905, she was elected vice president of Western Washington W.C.T.U. and held that title through 1909. She is credited with having designed the Samuel & Ira Ward House at 137 Sherman St NW in Olympia, which was built around 1889. Page then became a schoolteacher in Washington state and was active in the Woman's Christian Temperance Union. She died of heart failure on October 21, 1921, in Kansas City.
