= 1820 in architecture =

The year 1820 in architecture involved some significant events.

== Events ==
- Approximate date – Gatcombe Park, Gloucestershire, England, is remodelled by George Basevi (a relative of the owner at this time, economist David Ricardo).

== Buildings and structures ==
=== Buildings completed ===
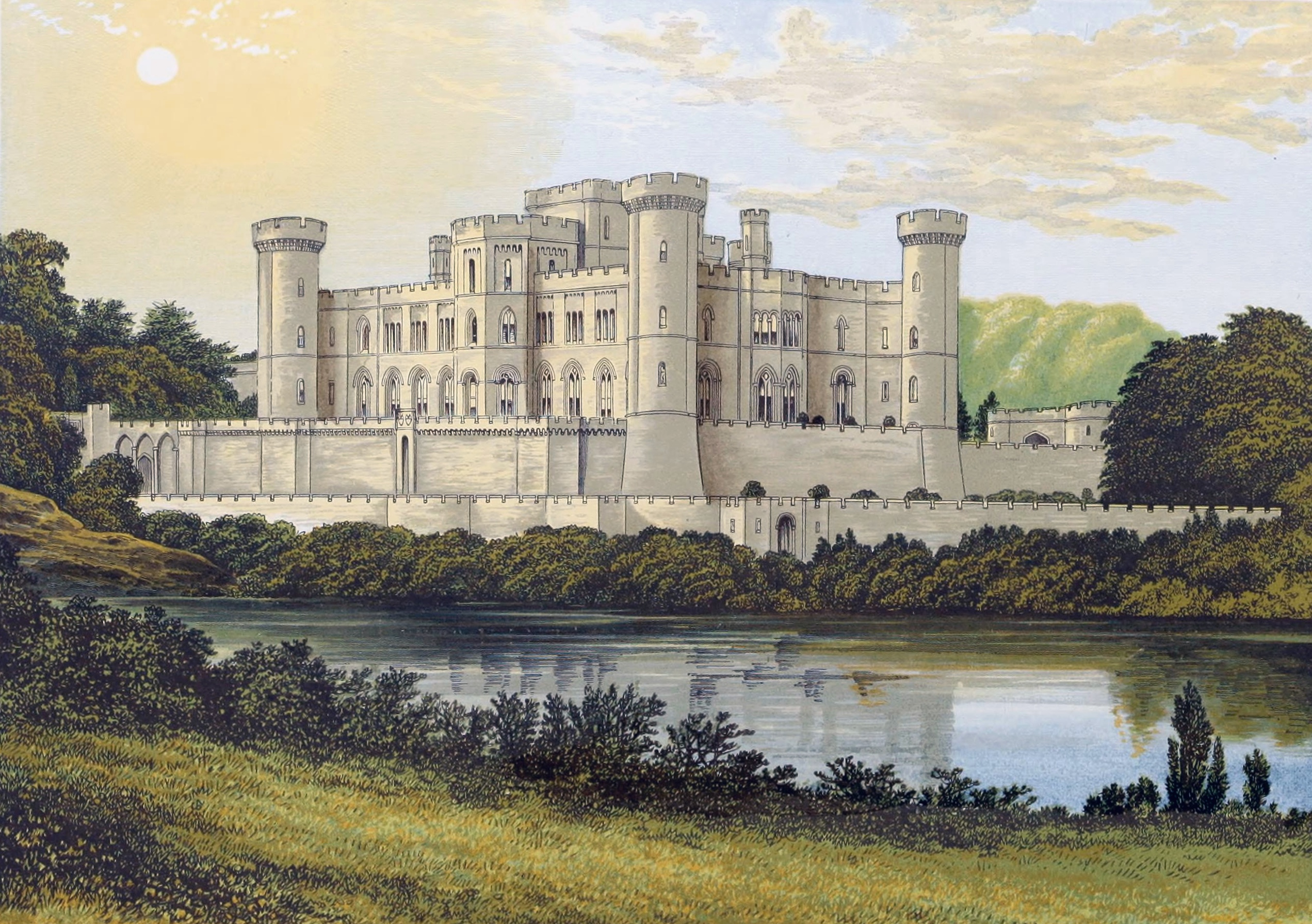
Eastnor Castle in the 19th century

- Charlotte Square, completing the construction of New Town, Edinburgh, Scotland; laid out to the design of Robert Adam (died 1792).
- Bakers Island Light, Salem, Massachusetts, USA.
- Citadelle Laferrière in Haiti, the largest fortification in the Americas.
- Clock tower of Cathedral of St. Mary the Crowned, Gibraltar.
- Eastnor Castle, Herefordshire, England, by Robert Smirke.
- Inveraray Jail and Courthouse, Scotland, by James Gillespie Graham.
- Óbuda Synagogue, Hungary.
- Pont de la Tosca, Andorra.
- 'Stack A' bonded warehouse, Custom House Docks, Dublin, Ireland, by John Rennie the Elder.

== Awards ==
- Grand Prix de Rome, architecture: François Villain

== Births ==
- April 21 – Peter Kerr, architect (died 1912)
- date unknown – George Devey, artist and architect (died 1886)

== Deaths ==
- March 7 – Thomas Baldwin, English surveyor and architect in Bath (born c.1750)
- May 17 – Vincenzo Brenna, Italian architect and painter (born 1747)
- September 3 – Benjamin Latrobe, Neoclassical architect known for the Capitol building (born 1764)
- October 4 – Thomas Hope, architect and house joiner (born 1757)
