= 1795 in architecture =

The year 1795 in architecture involved some significant events.

== Buildings and structures ==
=== Buildings ===
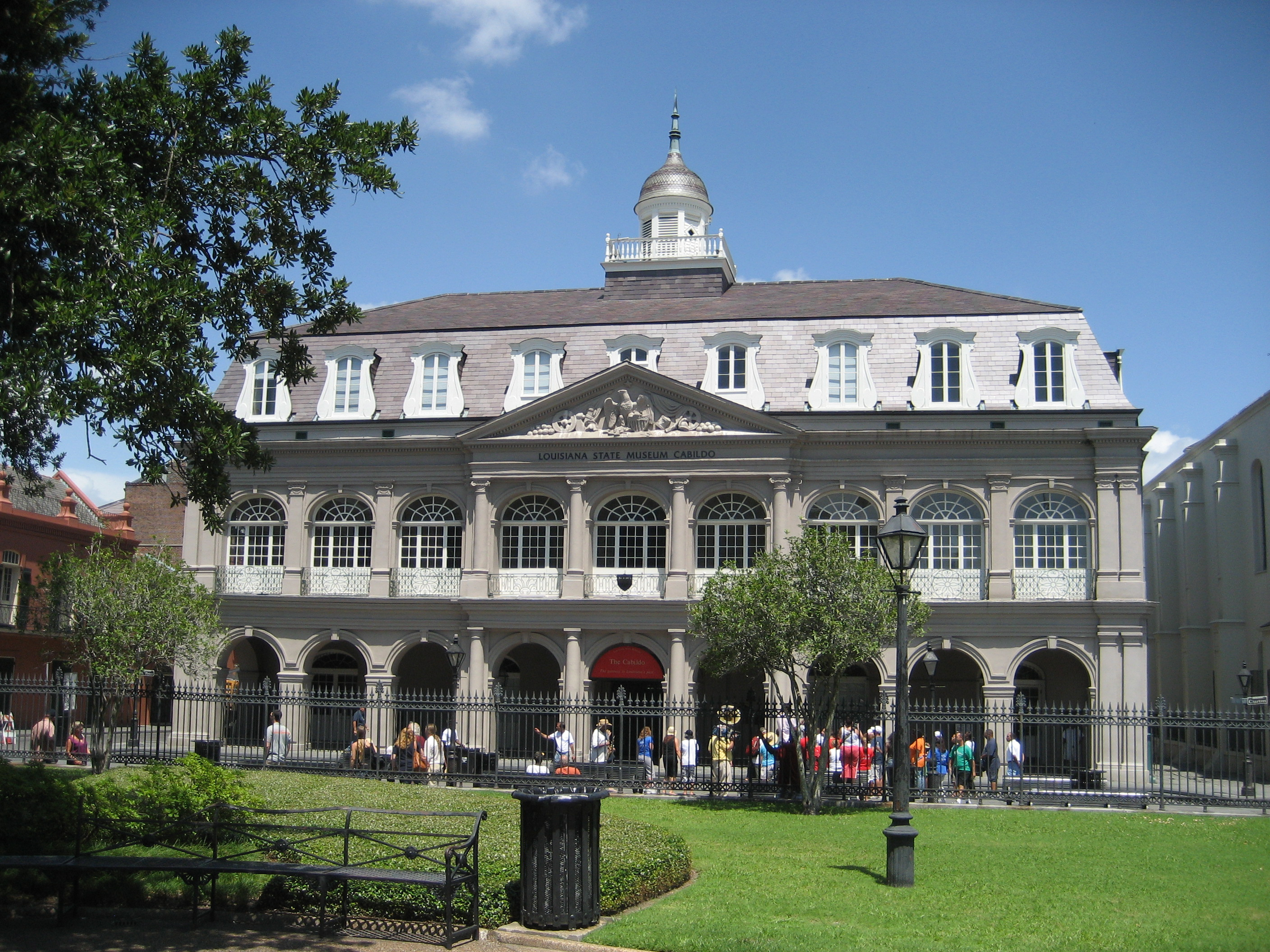
The Cabildo in New Orleans

- Franklin Place in Boston, Massachusetts, designed by Charles Bulfinch, is completed.
- Old North Building at Georgetown College in Washington, D.C., probably designed by Leonard Harbaugh, is completed.
- Remodelling of Łazienki Palace in Warsaw by Domenico Merlini, begun in 1764, is completed.
- Church of St. Mary Magdalene, Bridgnorth, Shropshire, England, designed by Thomas Telford, is completed.
- The Welsh Bridge in Shrewsbury, Shropshire, England, designed and built by John Tilley and John Carline, is completed.
- Gallowgate Barracks in Glasgow, Scotland, are built.
- The Cabildo in New Orleans (first phase) is started (completed in 1799).

== Births ==
- April 3 – Richard Lane, English architect (died 1880)
- May 23 – Charles Barry, English architect (died 1860)
- October 19 – Thomas Leverton Donaldson, English architect (died 1885)
- Approximate date – John Forbes, English architect working in Cheltenham

== Deaths ==
- June 23 – James Craig, Scottish architect (born 1744)
