= Punta La Entallada Lighthouse =

Lighthouse on Fuerteventura, Spain

Punta La Entallada Lighthouse Punta Lantailla
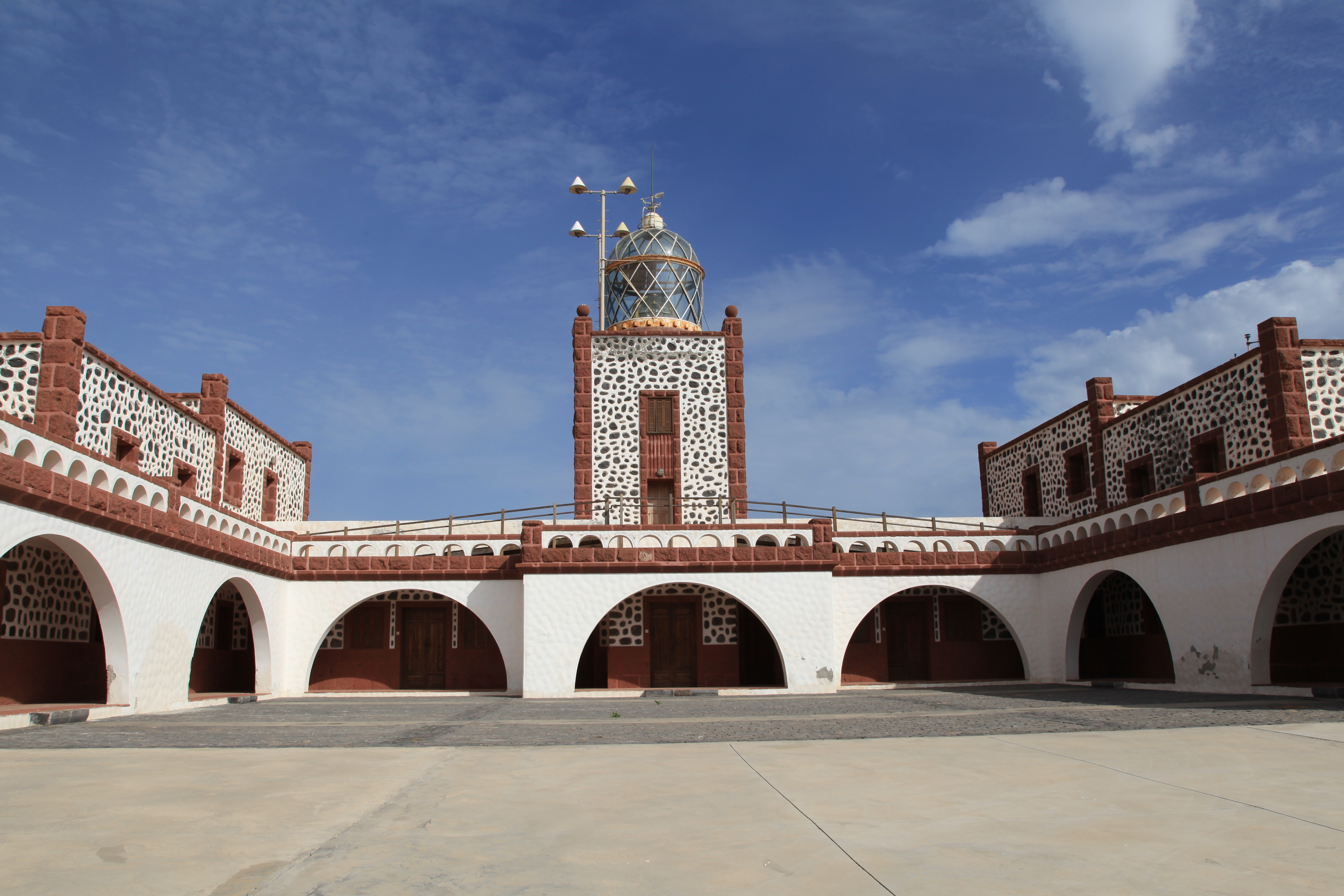
- Location: Tuineje; Fuerteventura; Canary Islands; Spain
- Coordinates: 28.230412°N 13.948550°W

Tower
- Constructed: 1955
- Construction: rubble masonry tower
- Height: 12 metres (39 ft)
- Shape: square tower
- Operator: Autoridad Portuaria de Las Palmas de Gran Canaria

Light
- Focal height: 196 metres (643 ft)
- Range: 21 nautical miles (39 km; 24 mi)
- Characteristic: L 0 4 oc 1 2 L 0 4 oc 7 8 L 0 4 oc 7 8
- Spain no.: ES-12190

Punta La Entallada or La Entallada Lighthouse (Spanish: Faro de La Entallada) is an active lighthouse on the Canary island of Fuerteventura. It is located on the east coast, near the village of Las Playitas in Tuineje.

== History ==
Completed in 1955, it was constructed by the architect Carlos Alcon who incorporated elements of Moorish architecture in a unique design. Contrasting masonry and white washed mortar has been used to produce a distinctive exterior facade. The coloured stone originating from the village of Tetir, in the centre of the island.

On the seaward face the lighthouse has three square towers, the tallest central tower supporting the lantern dome, which is made entirely of glass. On the landward side the building extends into two arms, with a central courtyard enclosed on three sides by an arched walkway.

Situated on high cliffs provides a focal height of 196 m above the sea; the third highest in the Canaries. Its light can be seen for 21 nautical miles, and consists of three flashes of white light every eighteen seconds.

The prominent location means that it is now promoted as a point of interest for tourists, with a viewpoint and car park. The lighthouse is considered to be the closest point in the Canaries to Africa, 100 km to the east.

As well as acting as a maritime light, it has also been used historically as an aerial beacon. Aircraft from Gando airfield were directed towards the Spanish Sahara by the lighthouse, including those used in the Ifni conflict.

In 2011, La Entallada in conjunction with five other lighthouses was depicted in a set of six commemorative stamps by Correos the Spanish postal service.

== Gallery ==
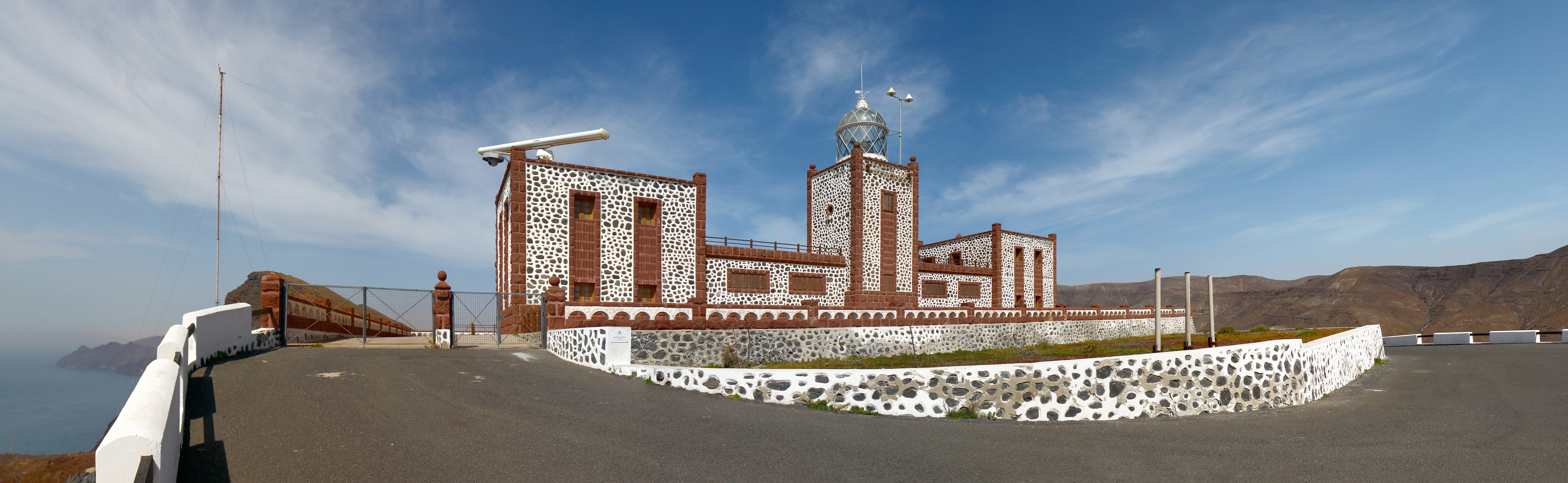
Panorama of the lighthouse
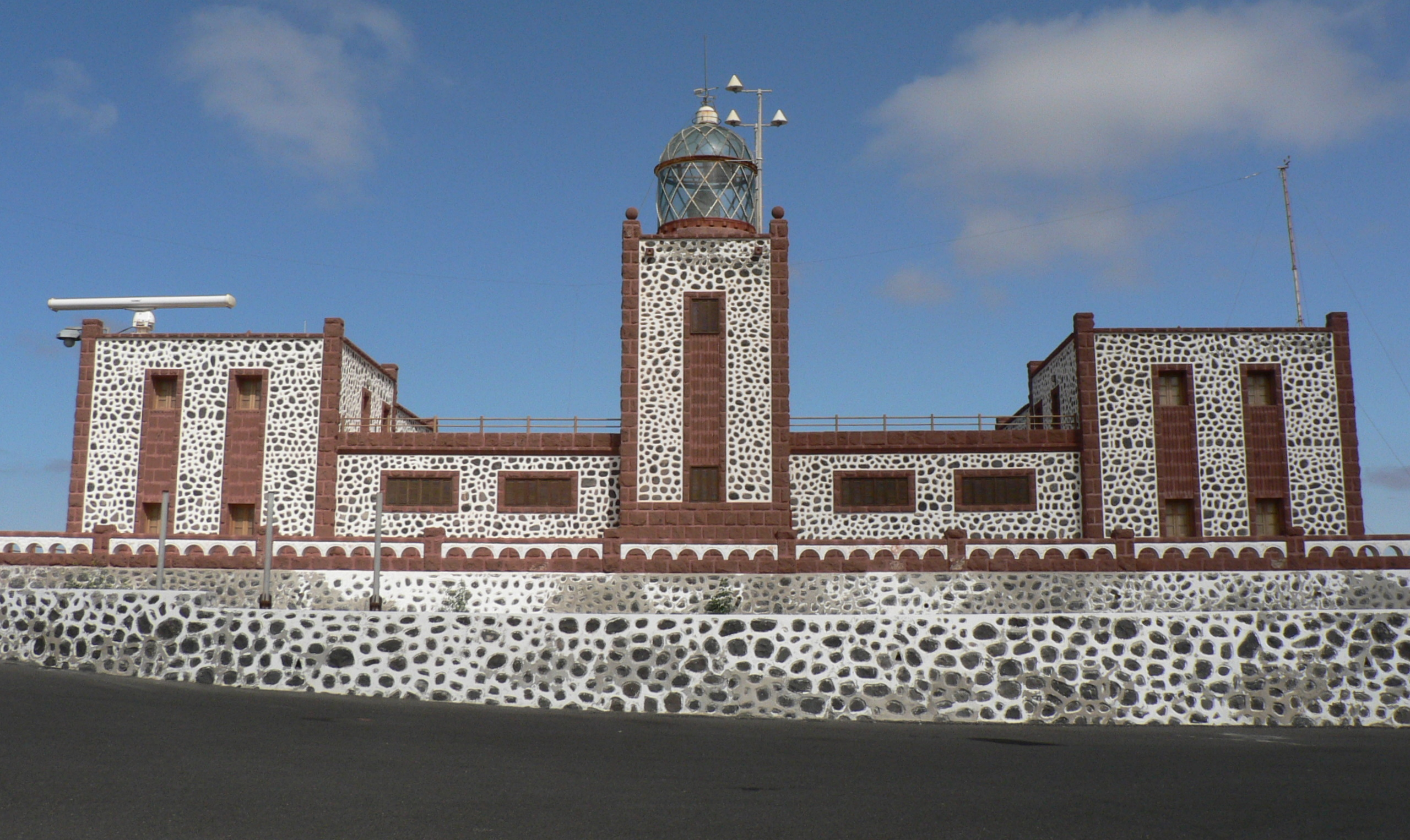
Front elevation

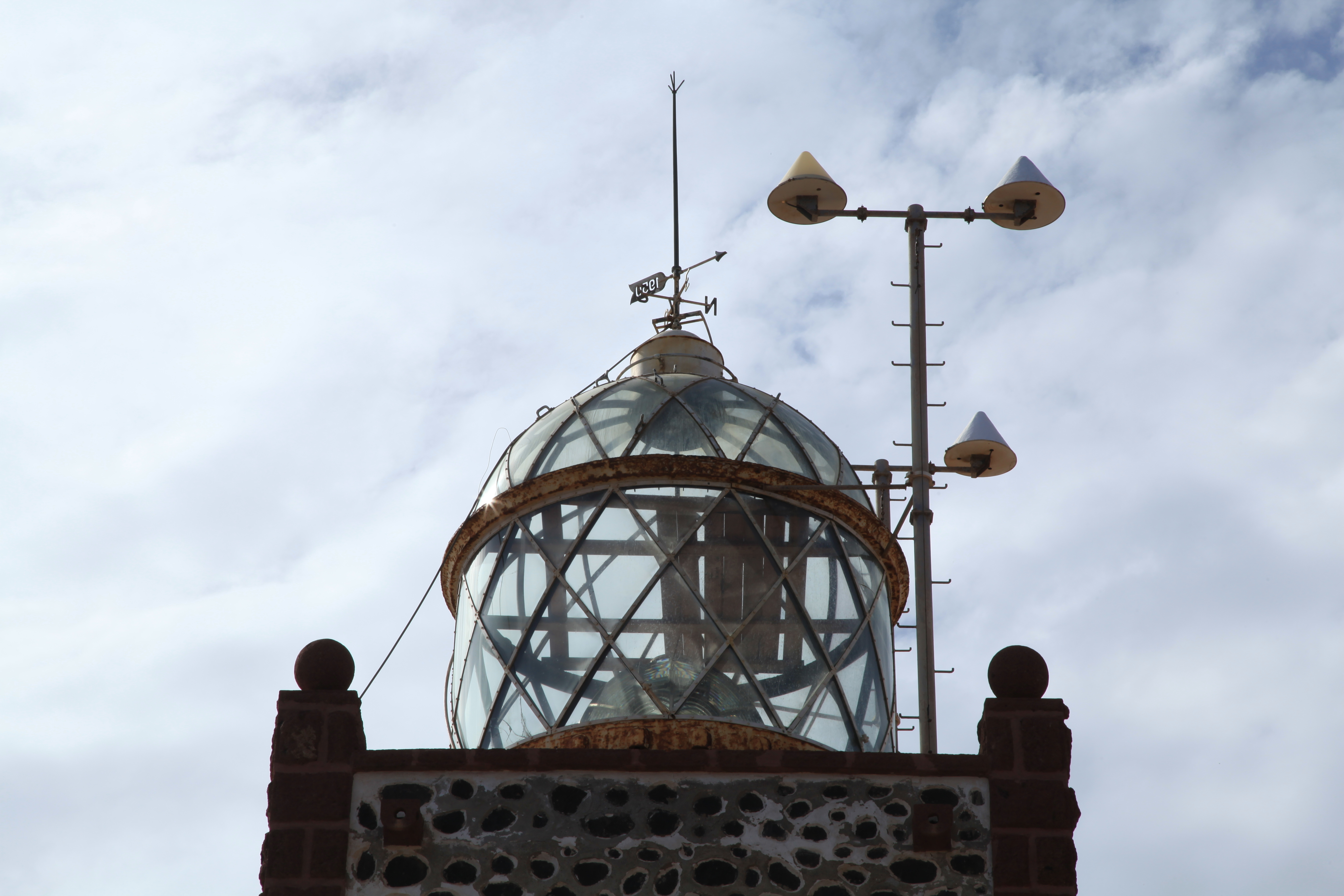
Glass lantern

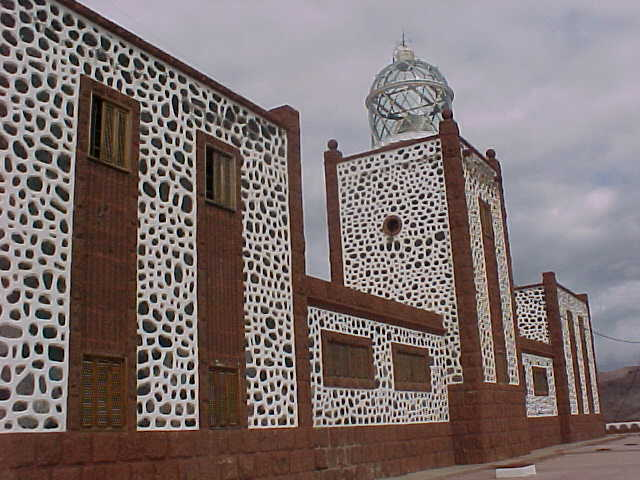
Building details

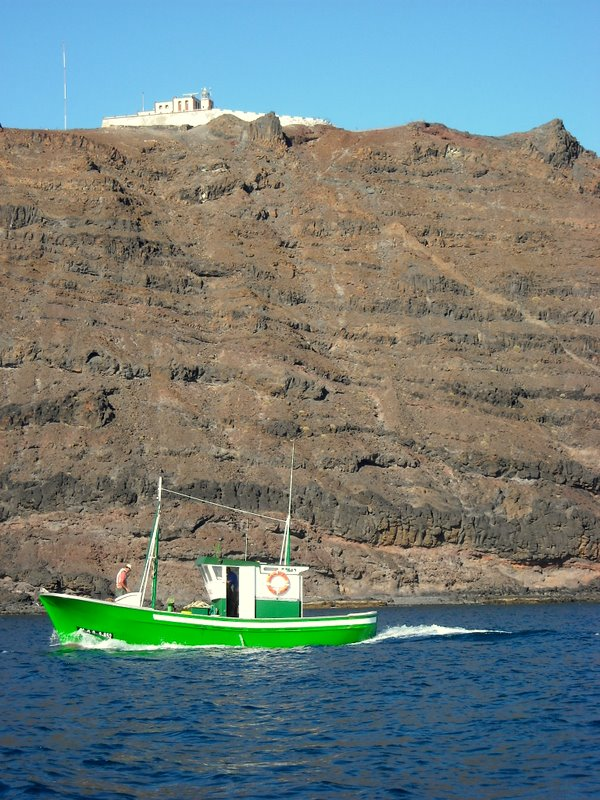
View from the Sea
Map showing the principal lighthouses of Fuerteventura

== See also ==
- List of lighthouses in Spain
- List of lighthouses in the Canary Islands
