= Margaret Hicks (architect) =

American architect

- Born: 1858
- Died: 1883 (aged 24–25); Cambridge, Massachusetts, U.S.
- Education: Cornell University
- Occupation: Architect
- Spouse: Arthur Karl Volkmann

Margaret Hicks (1858–1883) was an American architect who was the first woman architect to publish in a professional architectural journal.

== Biography ==
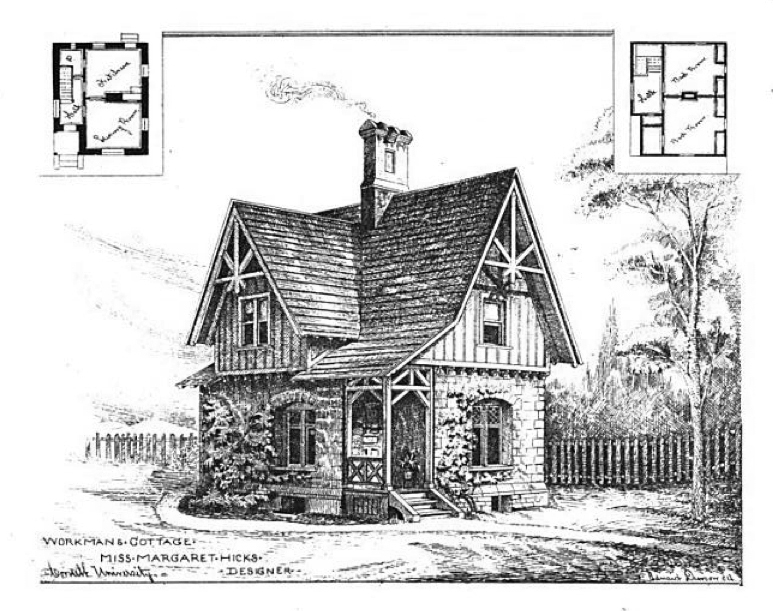
Design for a workman's cottage by Margaret Hicks in 1878

Hicks was born in 1858 and attended Cornell University, where she got a B.A. in 1878 and then a bachelor of architecture degree in 1880. She was the first woman to receive an architectural degree from Cornell, one year after Mary L. Page became the first woman in the United States to receive an architectural degree from a university.

While still a student at Cornell, one of her projects, a workman's cottage, was published in American Architect and Building News (1878). It was republished in The Builder and Wood-Worker in 1883. Her "commencement essay" on tenement housing has been cited by one historian for its concern for such critical features as light and air that were often overlooked by other contemporary architects. This places Hicks squarely among a group of American women architects from the late 19th and early 20th century who became known for ignoring the middle-class market and giving their attention to the practical necessities of tenement and workers' housing—architects such as Mary Gannon and Alice Hands of Gannon and Hands and Marcia Mead and her partner Anna P. Schenck.

In 1880, Hicks married architect Arthur Karl Volkmann, who had graduated from Cornell in 1877. She died prematurely three years later in Cambridge, Massachusetts, at the age of 25.
