= Notre-Dame de Bon-Port =

Church in Loire-Atlantique, France

Coordinates: 47°12′35″N 1°34′10″W

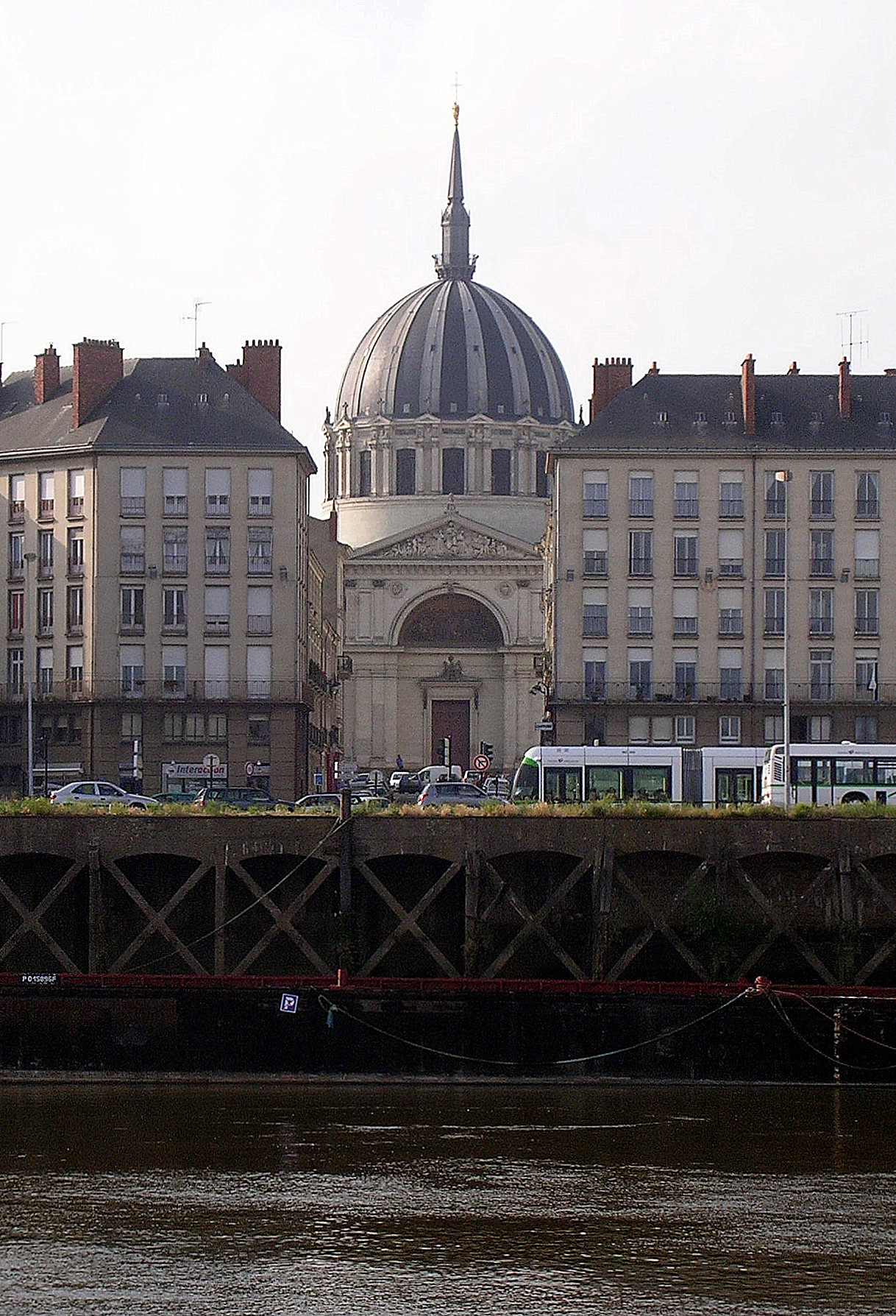
The Église Notre-Dame De Bon-Port, seen from the île de Nantes

Notre-Dame de Bon-Port is a Roman Catholic basilica located in Nantes, France. The church was constructed in 1846 by the architects Seheult and Joseph-Fleury Chenantais. Its official name is Église de Saint-Louis (Basilica of Saint-Louis), though it is rarely known by this name.

== Location ==
The basilica is located in Nantes at the Place du Sanitat, facing the Quai de la Fosse (Quay of the Pit). The dome which tops it is modelled on that of Les Invalides in Paris. At the top of the spire lies an archangel representing Saint Gabriel.
