= Château du Prada =

Château in Nouvelle-Aquitaine, France

Coordinates: 43°58′06″N 0°11′07″W

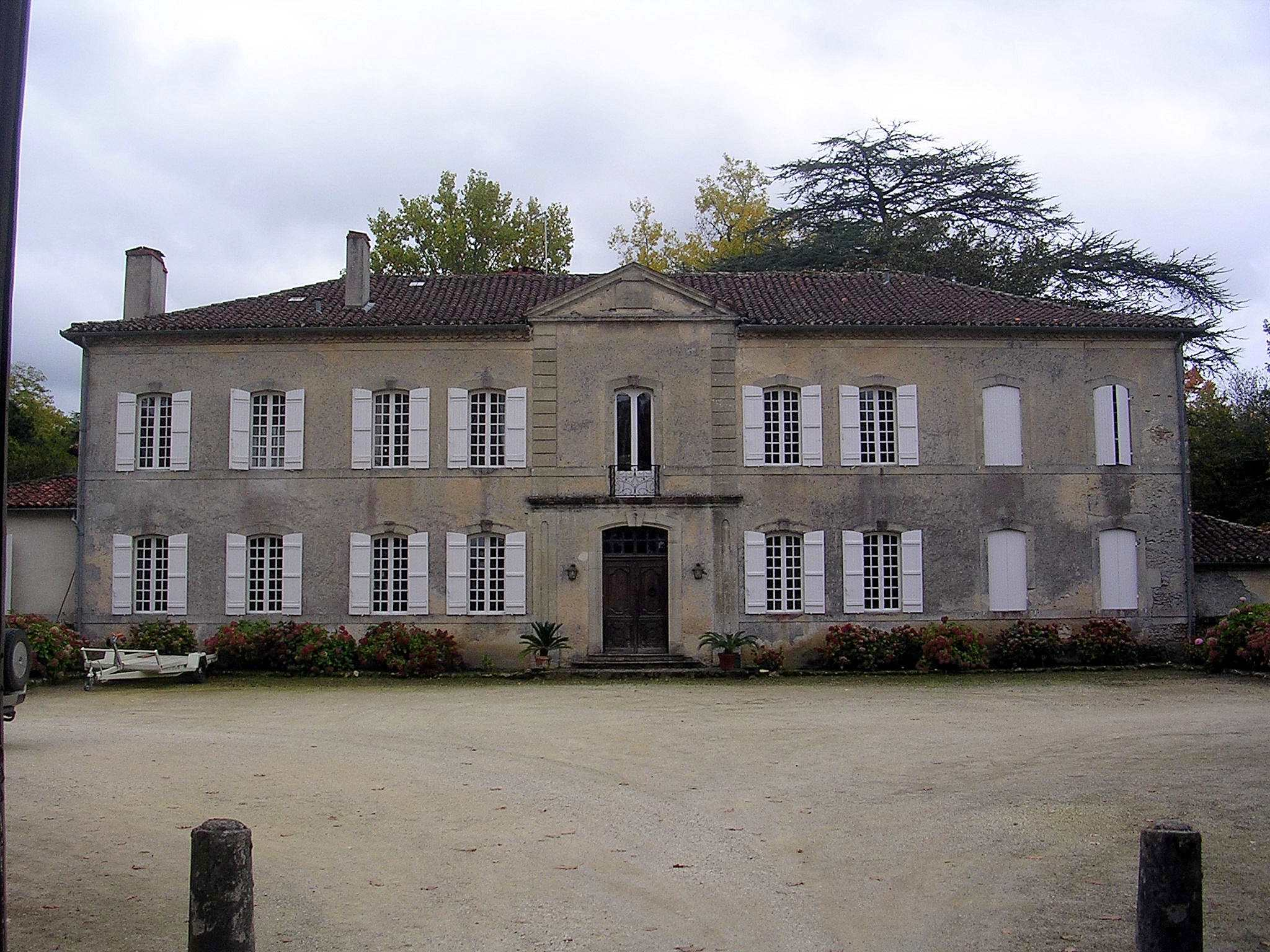
Château du Prada

Château du Prada is a château in Landes, Nouvelle-Aquitaine, France. It dates to 1764.
