= Sandy Hook Light =

Oldest working lighthouse in the US

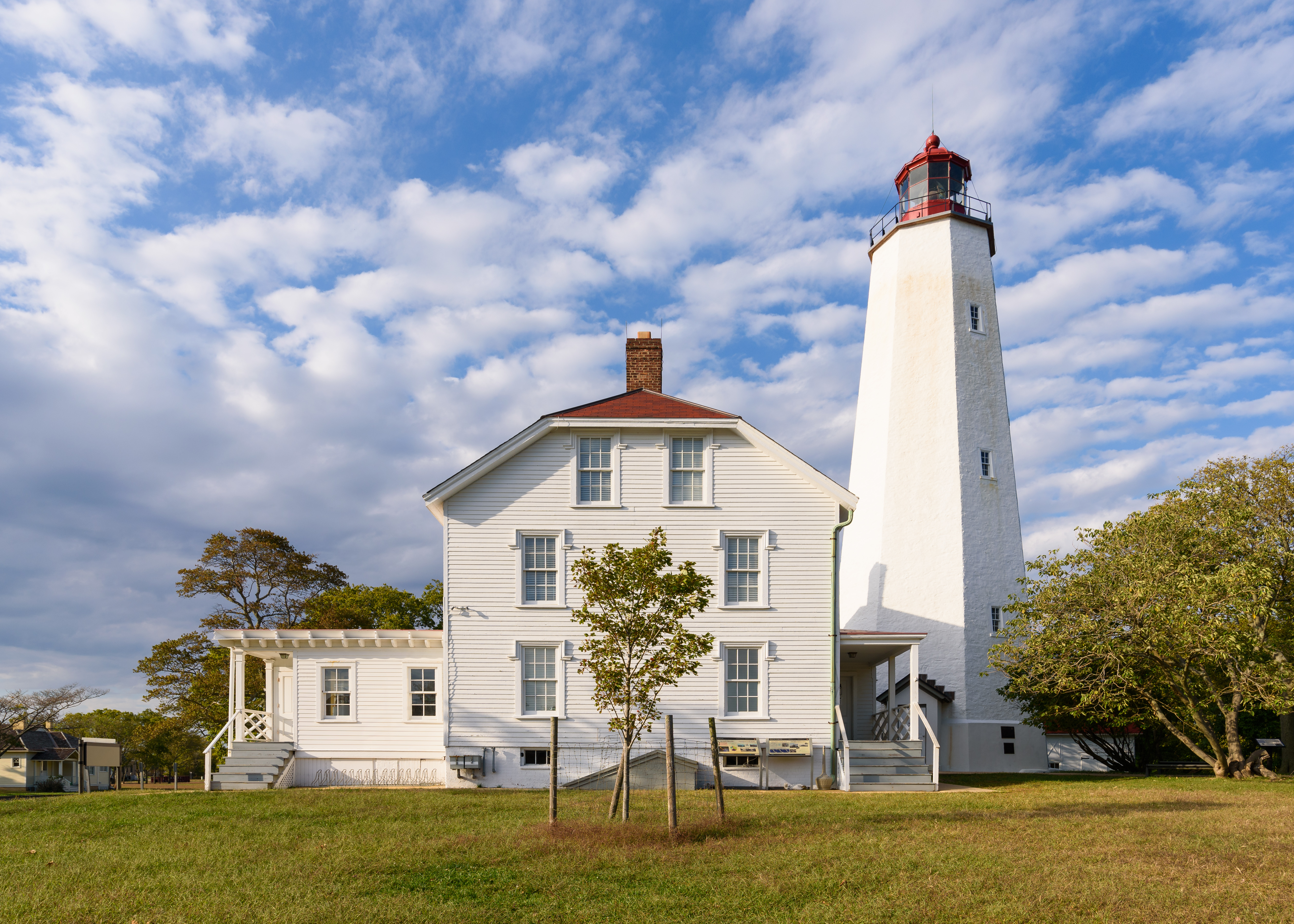
- Sandy Hook Lighthouse in 2020
- Location: Sandy Hook, New Jersey
- Coordinates: 40°27′42″N 74°00′07″W

Tower
- Constructed: June 11, 1764
- Foundation: Stone
- Construction: Rubble
- Automated: 1965
- Height: 103 feet (31 m)
- Shape: Octagonal
- Heritage: National Historic Landmark, National Register of Historic Places listed place

Light
- Focal height: 27 m (89 ft)
- Lens: third order Fresnel lens
- Range: 19 nautical miles (35 km; 22 mi)
- Characteristic: Fixed white lighted throughout 24 hours
- Sandy Hook Light
- U.S. National Register of Historic Places
- U.S. National Historic Landmark
- New Jersey Register of Historic Places
- Location within Monmouth County, New Jersey Location within New Jersey Location within the United States
- NRHP reference No.: 66000468
- NJRHP No.: 2029

Significant dates
- Added to NRHP: October 15, 1966
- Designated NHL: January 29, 1964
- Designated NJRHP: May 27, 1971

The Sandy Hook Lighthouse, located about one and a half statute miles (2.4 km) inland from the tip of Sandy Hook, New Jersey, is the oldest working lighthouse in the United States. It was designed and built on June 11, 1764 by Isaac Conro. At that time, it stood only 500 feet (150 metres) from the tip of Sandy Hook; however, today, due to growth caused by littoral drift, it is almost one and a half miles (2.4 km) inland from the tip. It was listed as a National Historic Landmark in 1964 and added to the National Register of Historic Places on October 15, 1966, for its significance in commerce and transportation.

== History ==
The light was built to aid mariners entering the southern end of the New York Harbor. It was originally called New York Lighthouse because it was funded through a New York Assembly lottery and a tax on all ships entering the Port of New York. During the Revolutionary War, the lighthouse survived an attempt to destroy it as an aid to British navigation by Benjamin Tupper, and subsequent occupation by British soldiers.

Almost two years after the State of New York ratified the U.S. Constitution, the lighthouse was transferred to federal authority. George Washington wrote to the Senate on April 5, 1790, "I have directed my private secretary to lay before you copies of three acts of the legislature of New York ... An act for vesting in the United States of America the light-house and the lands thereunto belonging at Sandy Hook". The lighthouse is located on the grounds of Fort Hancock.

In 1990, the U.S. Postal Service issued a 25 cent stamp featuring the Sandy Hook Lighthouse.

== Today ==
Sandy Hook Lighthouse, which was restored in spring 2000, is part of the Sandy Hook Unit of Gateway National Recreation Area administered by the National Park Service. Tour times can be found at the park website. The view from the top includes the Atlantic Ocean, Sandy Hook Bay and the New York City skyline.

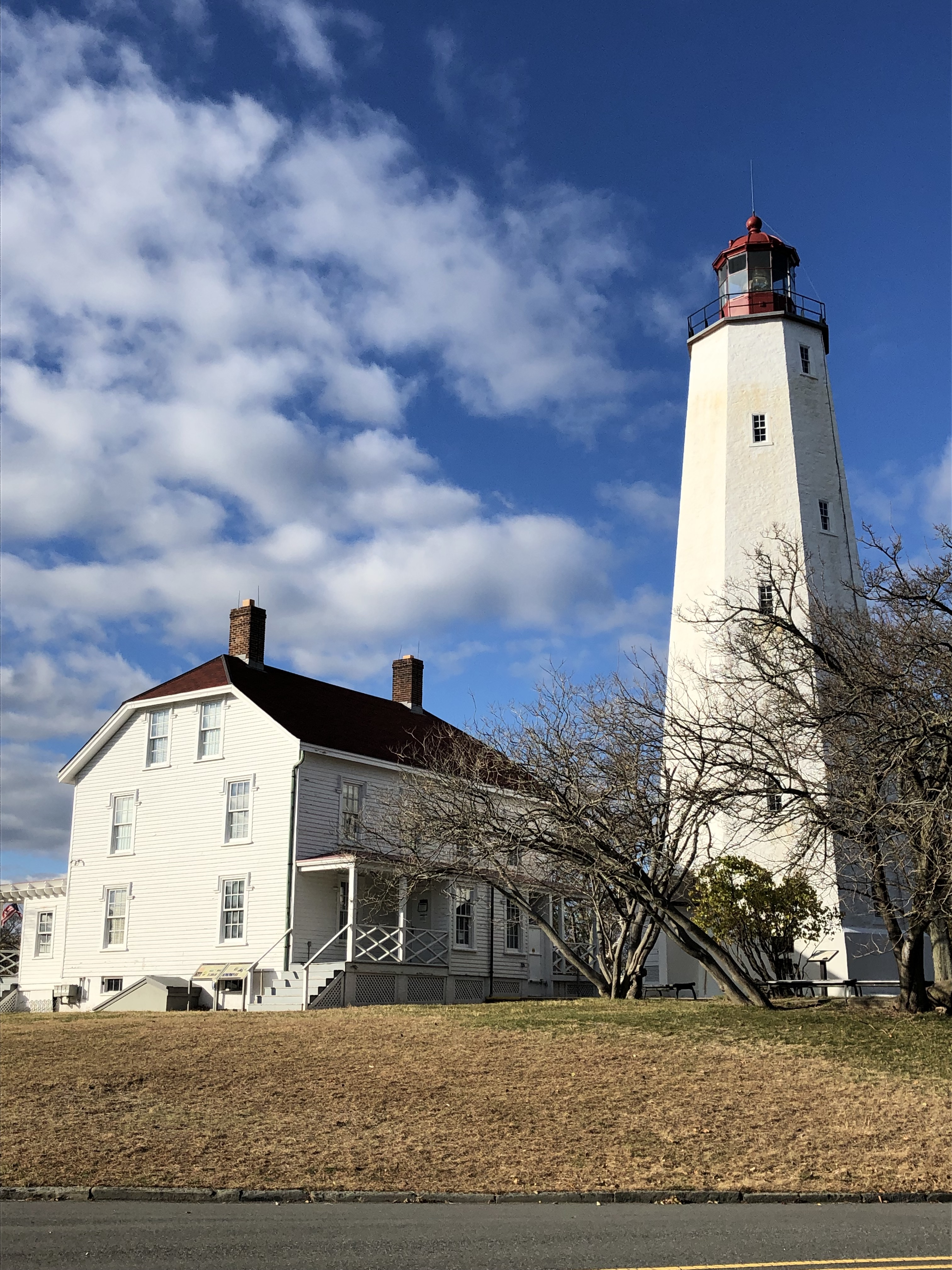
Sandy Hook Lighthouse in 2021

== In popular culture ==
- On September 18, 2009 the Sandy Hook Light was filmed as a fictional backdrop for final episode of the longest running soap opera Guiding Light.

== See also ==
- List of National Historic Landmarks in New Jersey
- List of the oldest buildings in New Jersey
- Lightship Ambrose
- Geography of New York-New Jersey Harbor Estuary
- Raritan Bayshore
