= Dominus Flevit Church =

Catholic church in Jerusalem

Coordinates: 31°46′41″N 35°14′30″E

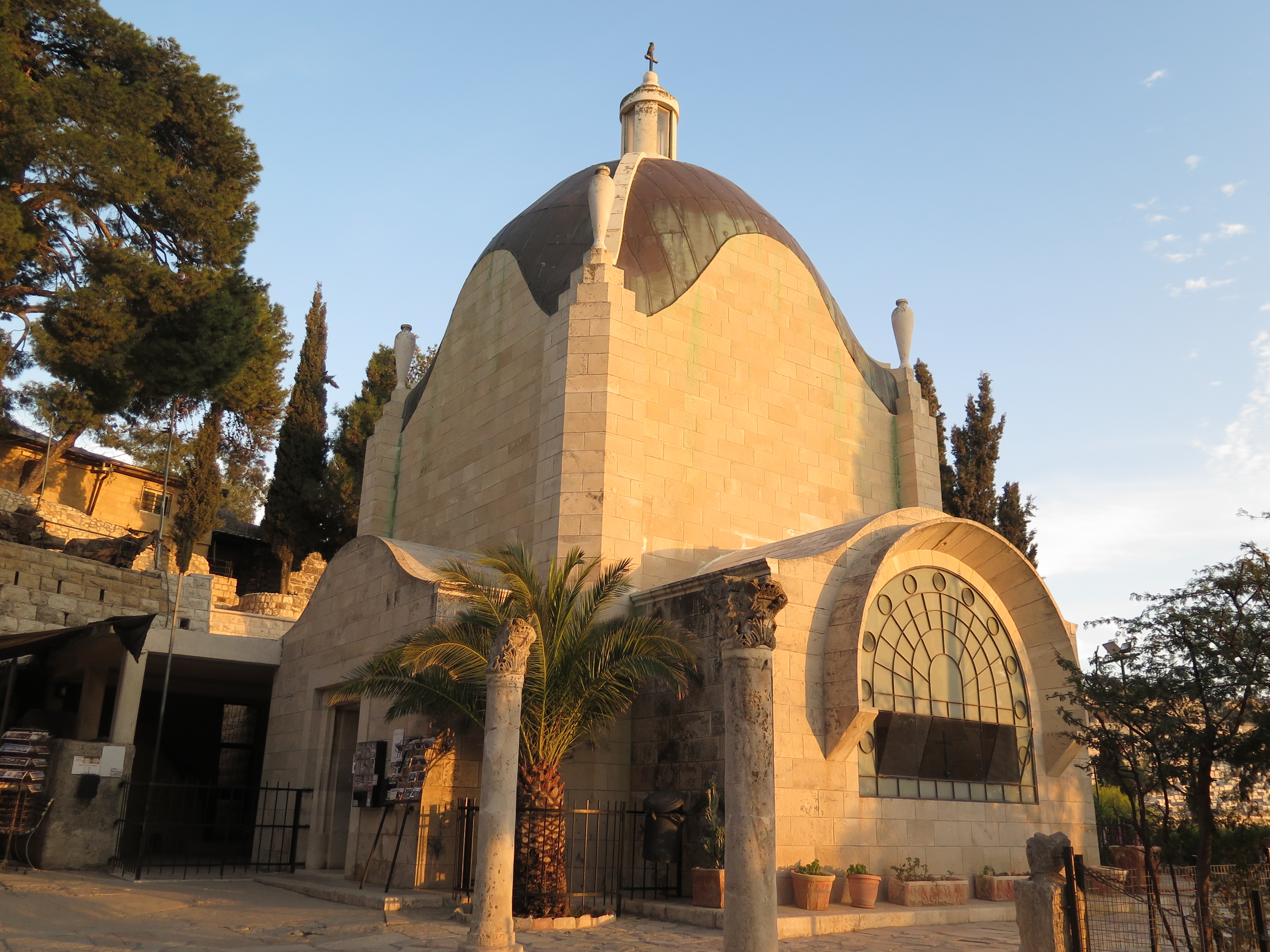
- View from the Courtyard

Religion
- Affiliation: Roman Catholic
- Leadership: Franciscan Order

Location
- Location: Jerusalem
- Interactive map of Dominus Flevit Church

Architecture
- Architect: Antonio Barluzzi
- Completed: 1955

Dominus Flevit (Latin, "the Lord wept") is a Roman Catholic church on the Mount of Olives, opposite the walls of the Old City of Jerusalem in Israel. During construction of the sanctuary, archaeologists uncovered artifacts dating back to the Canaanite period, as well as tombs from the Second Temple and Byzantine eras.

== Archaeology ==
In 1940, the Benedictine Sisters sold part of the property to the Franciscans. The old boundary wall was moved at this time to make the division. In 1953 the Franciscans began construction of another wall. While digging the foundations, workers unearthed ancient tombs. Excavations began at the site, led by Fr. Bellarmino Bagatti, OFM.

=== Tombs; Byzantine monastery ===
A Canaanite tomb from the Late Bronze Age, as well as a necropolis used from 136 BC to AD 300 were discovered. The necropolis spanned two separate periods, characterized by differing tomb styles. The earlier Second Temple period tombs were of the kokh type, while the Byzantine period section was composed of tombs with arcosolium from the 3rd and 4th centuries AD. Excavations were carried out by Franciscan archaeologist Sylvester Saller.

A Byzantine monastery from the 5th century was also discovered. Mosaics from this monastery still remain at the site.

=== Byzantine mosaic ===
The Byzantine mosaic floor dates to the beginning of the seventh century CE. The floor is surrounded by ribbons and wave motifs. The centre of the carpet is divided by squares containing round frames. The circles contain fruit, vegetables, flowers and fish. The Byzantine mosaic attest to the importance of agriculture for the people of the period. The motifs reflect the developed and progressive agriculture of Byzantine Palestine including Jerusalem. Some images also contain unique elements, as for instance luffa for the producing of bathing sponges, edible snake melons, and figs tied by a blue string. Parts of the Byzantine mosaic can also be seen inside the modern church building, with a limestone slab bearing a large cross in the middle (fig. 2 in the gallery below).

== Architecture ==
Located on the western slope of the Mount of Olives, the church was designed and constructed between 1953 and 1955 by the Italian architect Antonio Barluzzi and is held in trust by the Franciscan Custody of the Holy Land. Dominus Flevit, which translates from Latin as "The Lord Wept", was fashioned in the shape of a teardrop to symbolize the tears of Christ.

== Picture gallery ==
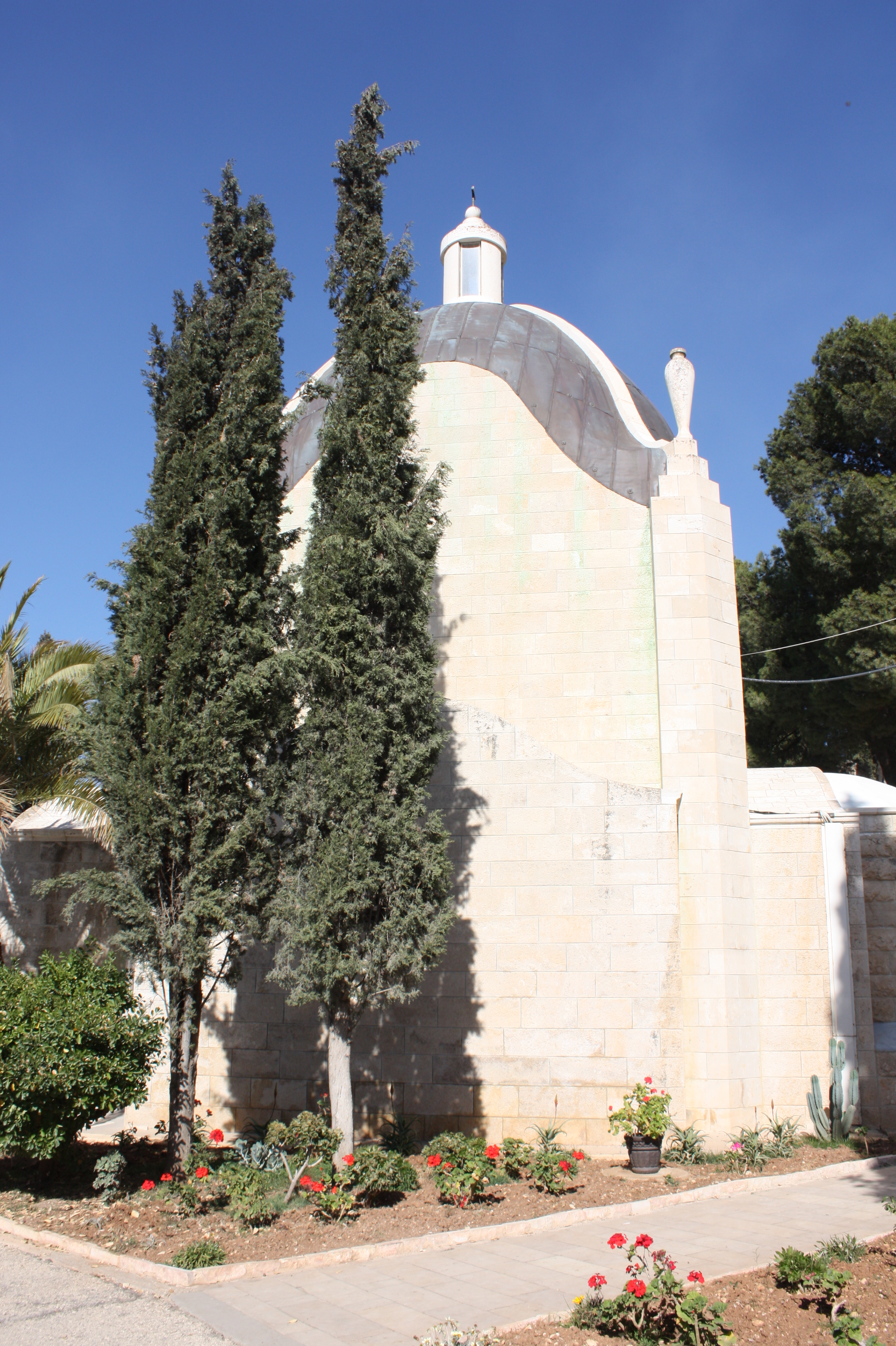
Side view of Dominus Flevit Church

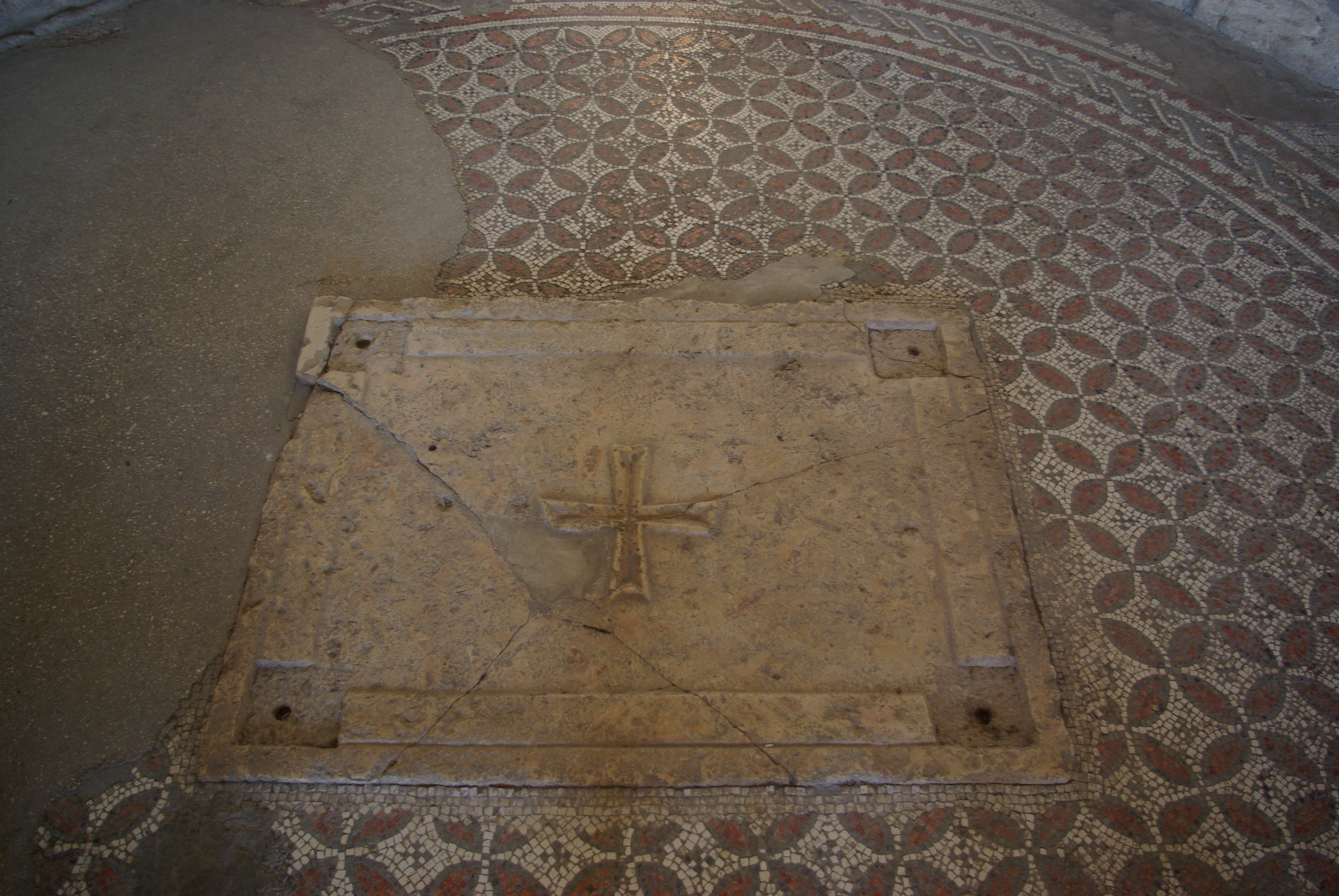
Fig 2. Mosaic and cross on the floor

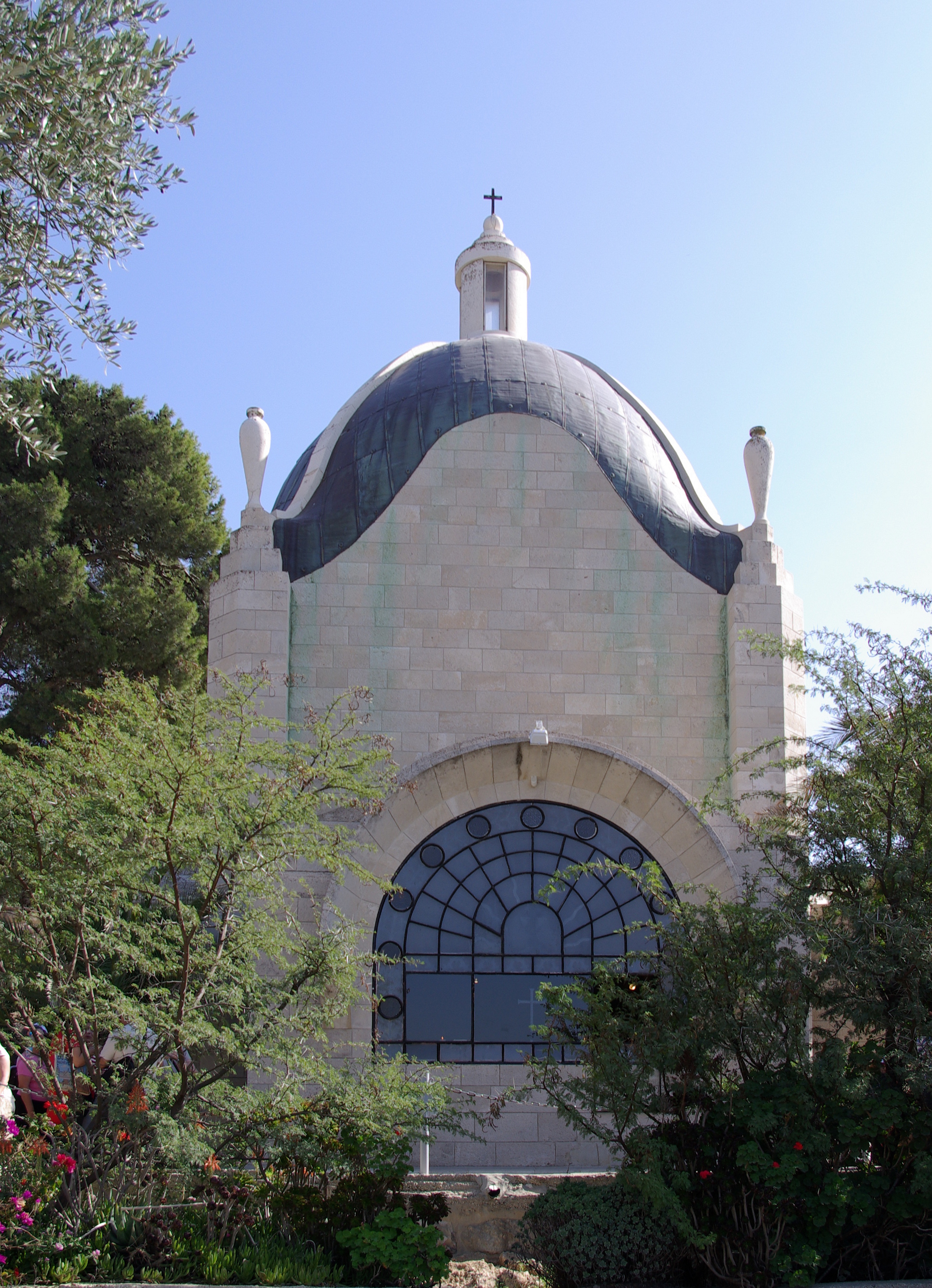
View from west

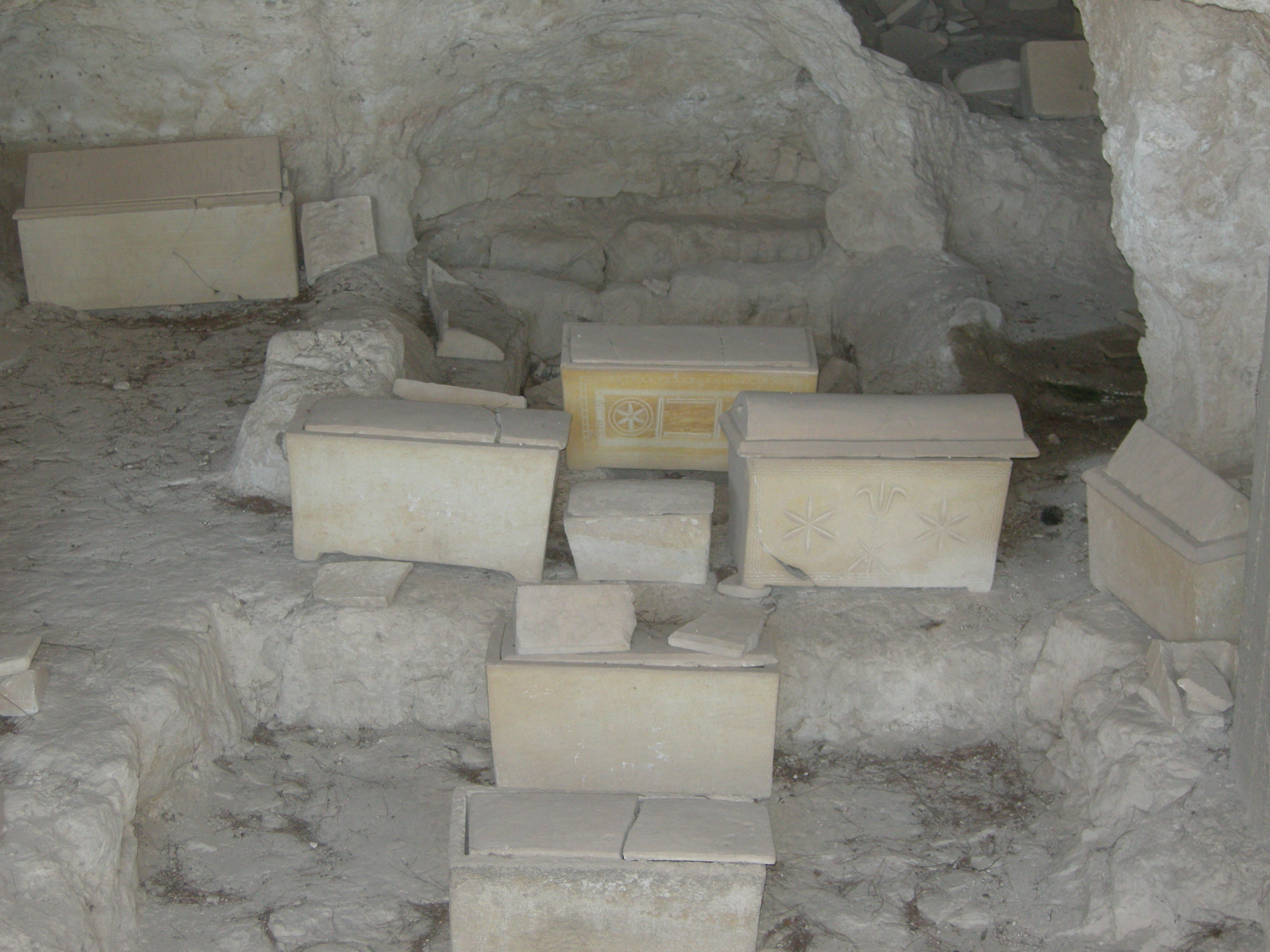
Ossuary

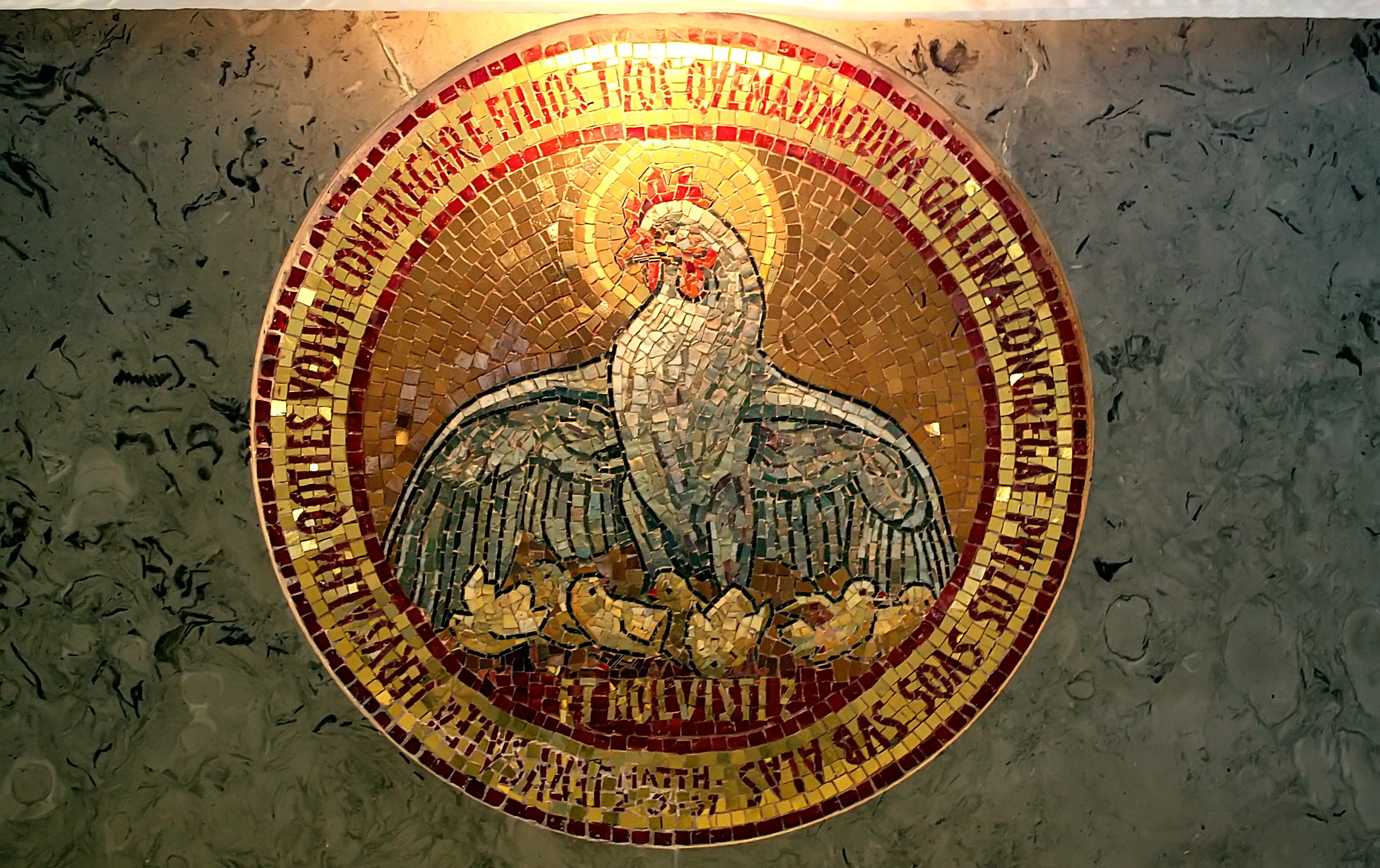
Mosaic Art on altar

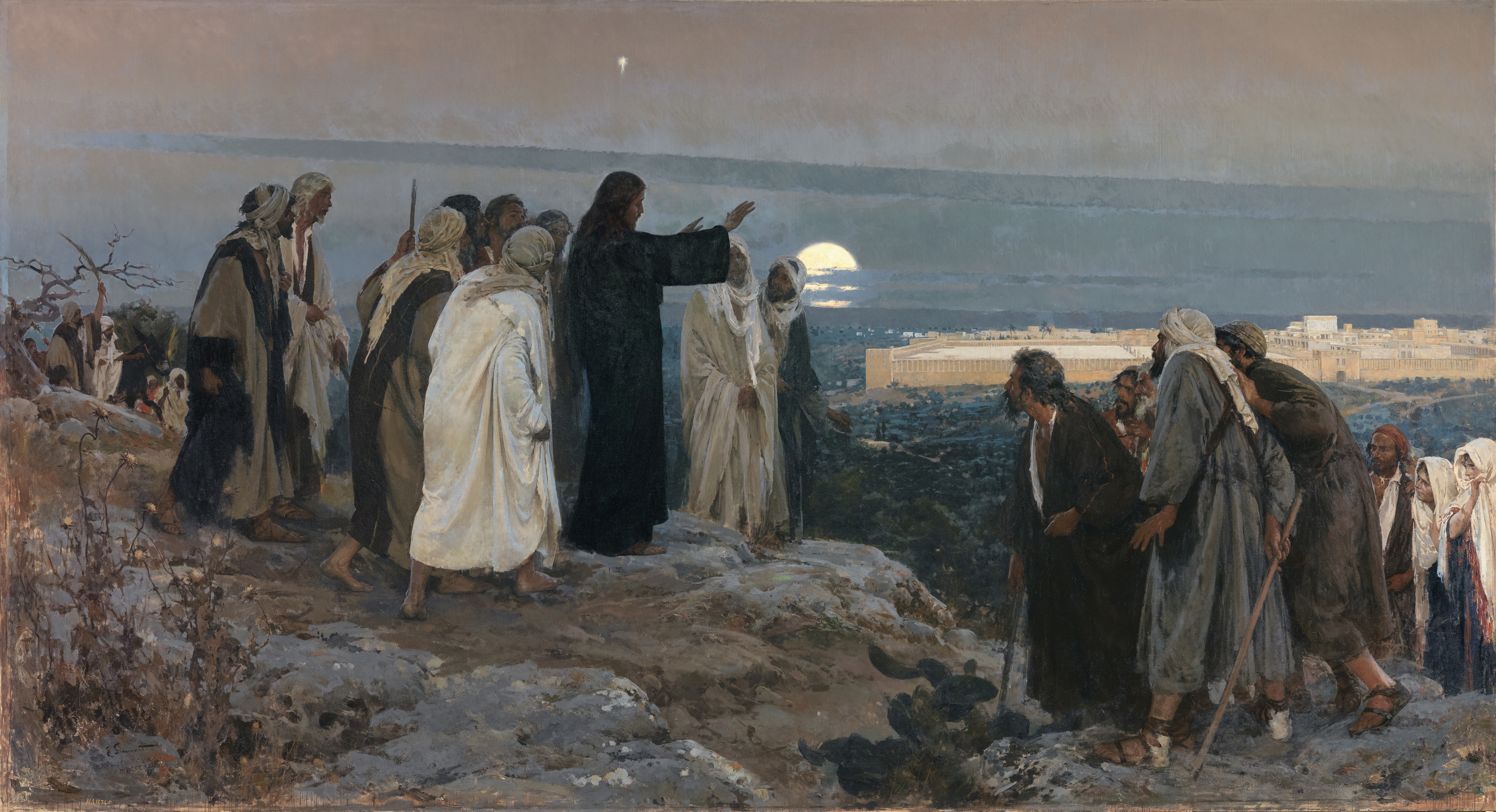
"Flevit super illam" (He wept over it) by Enrique Simonet, 1892

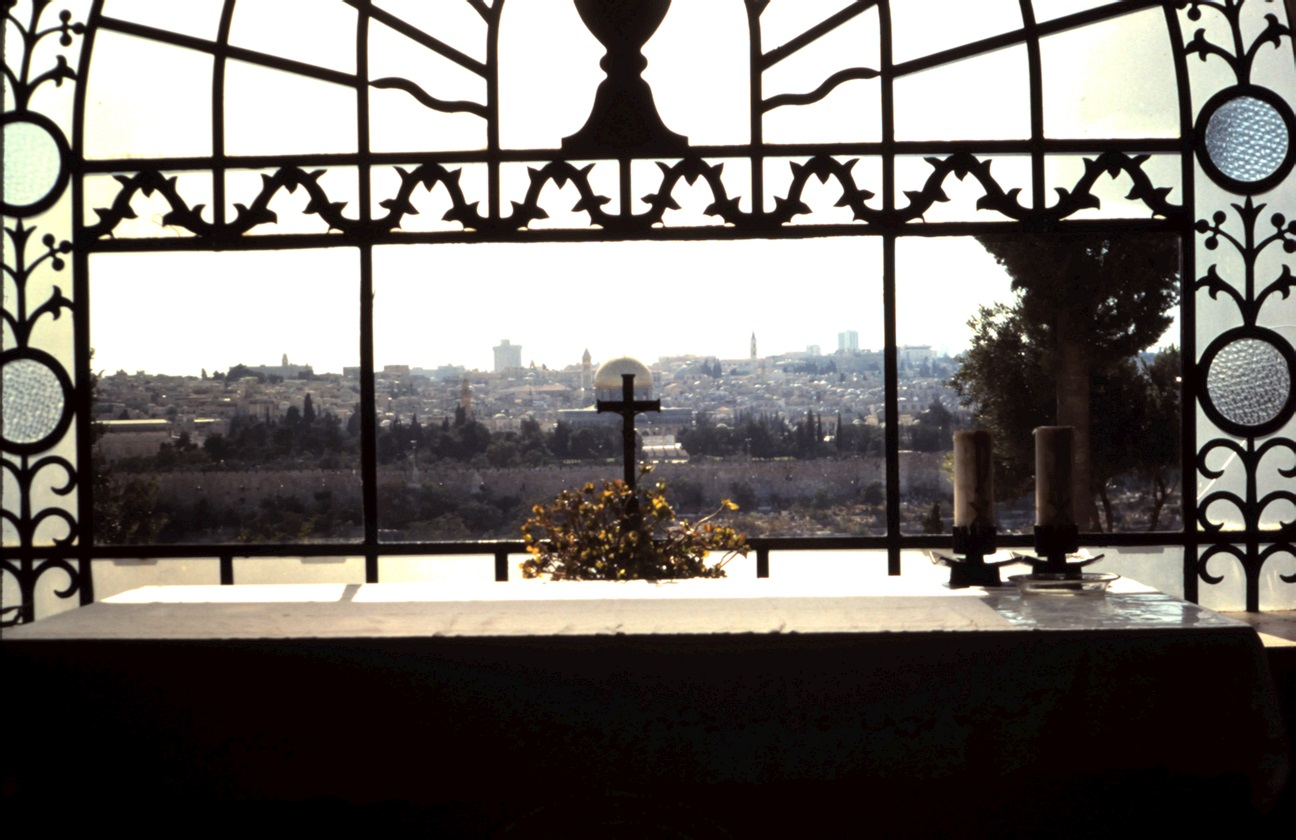
View from window towards the Old City
