= Isaac Conro =

American architect

Isaac Conro was a stonemason from New York City.

He is best remembered today for having built New Jersey's Sandy Hook Lighthouse in 1764, a structure whose principal task has been from the outset to guide ships into New York Harbor. Today it is the oldest standing navigational aid of any kind in the United States. Several later towers were based upon Conro's design, although he had no hand in their construction. His work was so solid that an 1852 Congressional inquiry determined Sandy Hook one of the three best-built lighthouses in the country.

He died in 1771.
