= Saint John the Baptist Church, Târgu Mureș =

Heritage site in Mureș County, Romania

Coordinates: 46°32′45″N 24°33′50″E

Saint John the Baptist Church
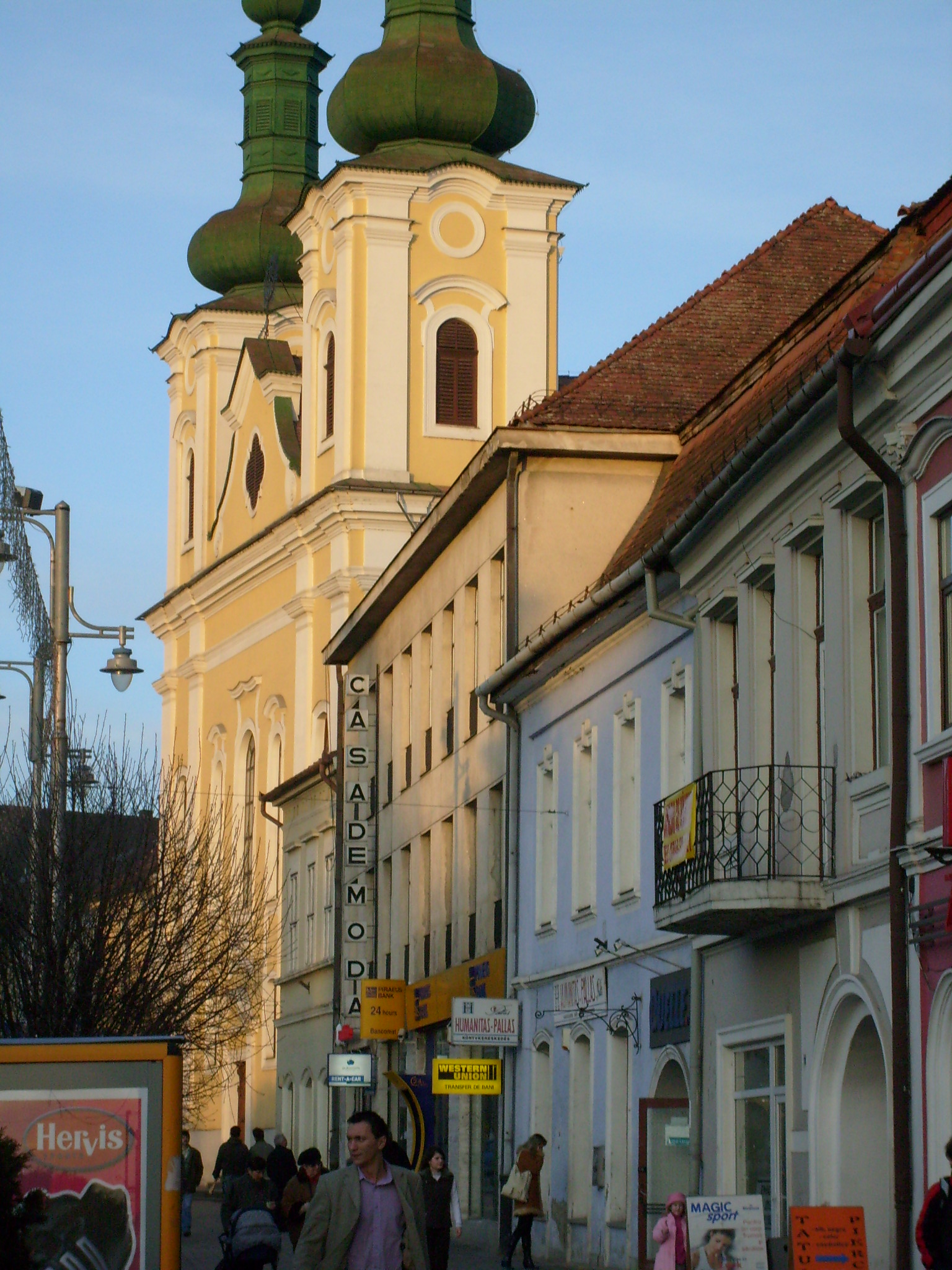

Religion
- Affiliation: Catholic
- Ecclesiastical or organizational status: Church

Location
- Location: Târgu Mureș, Romania
- Interactive map of Saint John the Baptist Church

Architecture
- Completed: 1764

Saint John the Baptist Church (Romanian: Biserica Sfântul Ioan Botezătorul, Hungarian: Keresztelő Szent János Plébánia) is a baroque, Catholic church in the city center of Târgu Mureș, Romania.

== History ==
Transylvania fulfilled all the requirements for the development of this new architectural style by the beginning of the 18th century, when it became part of the Habsburg Empire. Ignatius of Loyola initiated a strong campaign to convert people back to Catholicism. Jesuit monks settled in the town in 1702 with the purpose of revitalizing the Catholic community. During the first years, they found lodging in the home of Boer Simon, but in 1704 managed to buy a plot of land near the Nagy Szabo house in order to build a church. In 1764 a bigger church was built because of an increase in the Catholic population.

The church was constructed based on the plans of the Jesuit Valentin Scherzer and was raised by constructor Konrad Hammer from Cluj.

== Description ==
The facade is divided into three vertical registers and two horizontal levels. The first level includes the inferior part of the towers and the facade up to the gable. The rectangular opening of the entrance topped by a small semi-circular gable, the oblong semicircular windows of the middle register with the extremely plastically articulated "eyebrow" cornices, the rectangular windows with the slightly curved long sides, the niches which hold the statues of Saint Ignatius of Loyola and Francis Xavier, the monumental pilasters that mark the towers vertically are all elements of typical Baroque architecture. The superior part of the façade, delimited by a strongly-profiled cornice, includes the triangular gable with its sides slightly curved toward the exterior and decorated with volutes, as well as the two tower roofs shaped as successive bulbs.

The inside of the church is luxurious, with liturgical objects that are true works of art. The main altar, made in 1755 by Anton Schuchbauer and Johannes Nachtigall is of monumental dimensions and has a pseudo-architectural structure with paired columns which support a beautifully profiled entablement with gilded stucco. The main painting of the altar is The Baptism of God, supposedly painted by Michelangelo Unterberger, a student of the famous Baroque painter Giovanni Battista Piazzetta. The main altar also includes the coat-of-arms of the Haller family, the most important donor, and a painting of the Virgin and the Child. The painting is placed in a typically baroque ensemble made up of a false curtain supported by two putti – sunrays that seem to be springing from behind the painting – angel masks and decorative elements such as volutes. The adornment of the altar is accomplished by the angel statues on the upper area, above the columns, and the two statues in between the columns. The last two represent allegorical characters: Ecclesia embodied by Saint Barbara and the Synagogue represented by a prophet’s figure. The way body movement is reproduced, the subtle interpretation of the physiognomy, the volumetric and the draping of clothes make of these two statues masterpieces of Transylvanian Baroque art.

== See also ==
- List of Jesuit sites
