= 1998 in architecture =

The year 1998 in architecture involved some significant architectural events and new buildings.

== Events ==
- 22 May–30 September – Expo '98 held in Lisbon, Portugal. It includes the Pavilion of Portugal designed by Álvaro Siza Vieira.
- 22 December – Park Hill, Sheffield, 1961 flatted public housing in South Yorkshire, England, is Grade II* listed, making it the largest listed building in Europe.

== Buildings and structures ==
=== Buildings completed ===
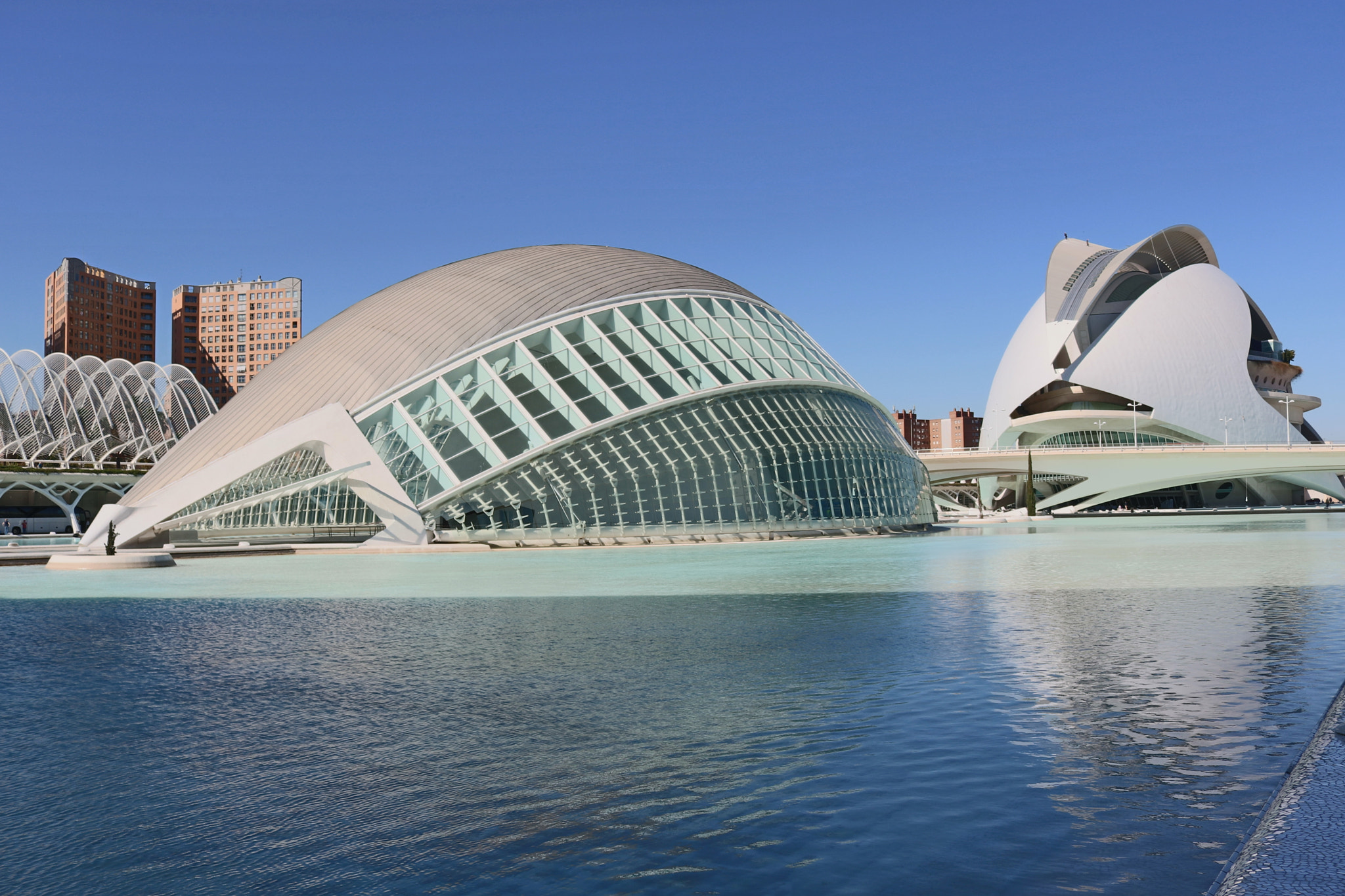
City of Arts and Sciences, Valencia, Spain

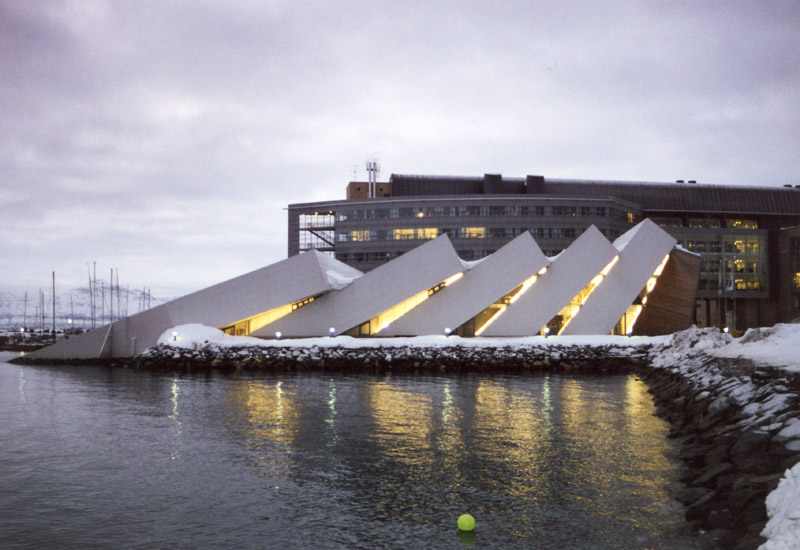
Polaria in Tromsø, Northern Norway

- 5 April – Akashi Kaikyō Bridge, Japan, the longest suspension bridge in the world by the length of central span (1998–present), designed by Satoshi Kashima, opened.
- 16 April – City of Arts and Sciences, Valencia, Spain, designed by Santiago Calatrava and Félix Candela, inaugurated.
- May–June – Preston England Temple, Chorley, England, opened.
- 31 May – Saint Paul's Cathedral, Wellington, New Zealand, opened.
- June – Jean-Marie Tjibaou Cultural Centre, New Caledonia, designed by Renzo Piano, opened.
- 6 July – Chek Lap Kok Airport in Hong Kong, designed by Norman Foster, opened.
- 15 October – Bellagio Hotel and Casino in Las Vegas, designed by Marnell Corrao Associates, opened.
- November – River and Rowing Museum, Henley-on-Thames, England, designed by David Chipperfield.
- Kiasma Museum of Contemporary Art, Helsinki, Finland, by Steven Holl Architects, opened.
- Gemäldegalerie, Berlin, Germany (in the Kulturforum), designed by Heinz Hilmer and Christoph Sattler, opened.
- Stadttor in Düsseldorf, Germany, designed by Karl-Heinz Petzinka, completed.
- Waterside (building) at Harmondsworth, England, international headquarters of the airline British Airways, designed by Niels Torp, opened.
- Lucerne Culture and Congress Centre in Switzerland, designed by Jean Nouvel, opened.
- Jin Mao Building in Shanghai, designed by Skidmore, Owings & Merrill, completed.
- Petronas Towers in Kuala Lumpur, designed by César Pelli, completed; it becomes the tallest buildings in Malaysia (1998–present), tallest building in the British Commonwealth (1998–2018) and tallest building in the world (1998–2004).
- B 018 nightclub in Beirut, designed by Bernard Khoury.
- Polaria and the Polar Environment Centre in Tromsø, Norway
- North Woolwich pumping station in London Docklands, designed by Nicholas Grimshaw & Partners.
- Malator (earth house) in Wales, designed by Future Systems.

== Awards ==
- Alvar Aalto Medal – Steven Holl
- Architecture Firm Award – Centerbrook Architects & Planners
- Carlsberg Architectural Prize – Peter Zumthor
- European Union Prize for Contemporary Architecture (Mies van der Rohe Prize) – Peter Zumthor for Kunsthaus Bregenz
- Grand Prix de l'urbanisme – Christian Devillers
- Grand prix national de l'architecture – Jacques Hondelatte
- Praemium Imperiale Architecture Laureate – Álvaro Siza
- Pritzker Prize – Renzo Piano
- Prix de l'Équerre d'Argent – Rem Koolhaas
- RAIA Gold Medal – Gabriel Poole
- RIBA Royal Gold Medal – Oscar Niemeyer
- Stirling Prize – Norman Foster and Partners for Imperial War Museum, Duxford
- Thomas Jefferson Medal in Architecture – Jaquelin T. Robertson
- Twenty-five Year Award – Kimbell Art Museum

== Deaths ==
- 6 January – Francis Skinner, British architect (born 1908)
- 12 January – Marya Lilien, Polish-American architect (born 1900 or 1901)
- 13 June – Lúcio Costa, Brazilian architect and urban planner (born 1902)
- 29 August – Erik Asmussen, Danish-born architect (born 1913)
- 31 October – Rosemary Stjernstedt, British architect (born 1912)
- 14 November – Albert Frey, Californian "desert modernist" architect (born 1903)
- 24 November – Minnette de Silva, Sri Lankan modernist architect (born 1918)
