= 1913 in architecture =

List of years in architecture	(table)
- … 1903; 1904; 1905; 1906; 1907; 1908; 1909; 1910; 1911; 1912; 1913; 1914; 1915; 1916; 1917; 1918; 1919; 1920; 1921; 1922; 1923 …
- Buildings and structures: Art; Archaeology; Architecture; Literature; Music; Philosophy; Science; +...

The year 1913 in architecture involved some significant events.

== Buildings and structures ==
- Work on Gartenstadt Falkenberg (Tuschkastensiedlung, "Paintbox Estate") in Bohnsdorf, earliest of the Berlin Modernism Housing Estates (Siedlungen der Berliner Moderne), begins to a design by Bruno Taut.

=== Buildings ===
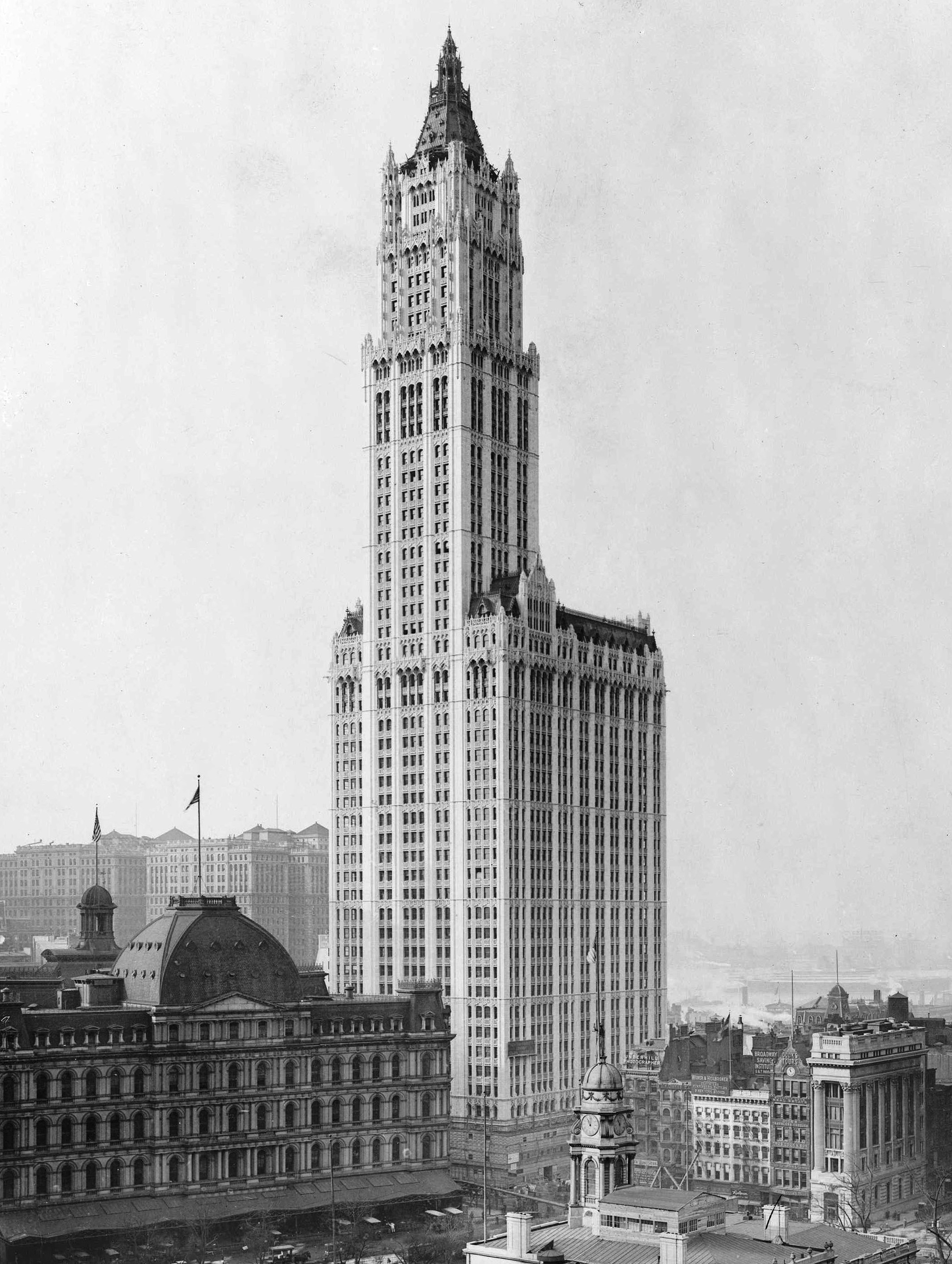
Woolworth Building when new

- February 1 – Grand Central Terminal, rebuilt, re-opens in New York City, United States.
- April 24 – The Woolworth Building opens in New York City, United States, designed by Cass Gilbert; the tallest building in the world at this date (1913 until 1930).

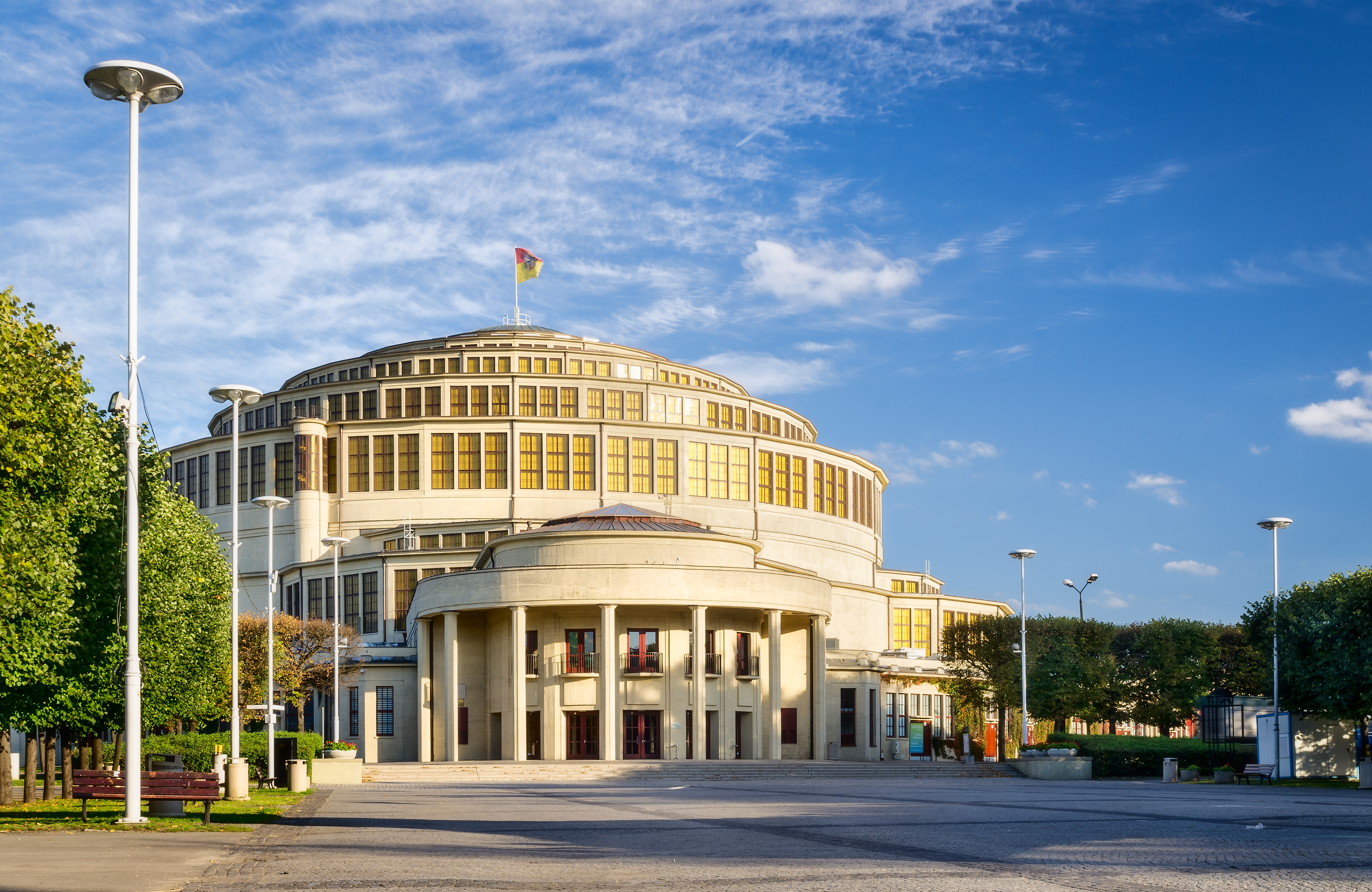
Centennial Hall in Breslau (Wrocław)

- May 20 – Centennial Hall in Breslau (Wrocław), designed by Max Berg.
- May 26 – Campbeltown Picture House (cinema) opens in Scotland, designed by Albert V. Gardner.
- May 31 – The Carol I Mosque (today known as the Grand Mosque of Constanța) in Constanța, Romania, designed by George Constantinescu, is inaugurated.
- July 20 – New Town Hall (Hanover), designed by Hermann Eggert and Gustav Halmhuber, opened.
- October 18 – Monument to the Battle of the Nations at Leipzig, designed by Bruno Schmitz, is inaugurated.
- Sinaia railway station in Sinaia, Romania.
- City Federal Building in Birmingham, Alabama, the tallest building in Alabama until 1969.
- Alberta Legislature Building in Edmonton, Alberta completed.
- Union Buildings, Pretoria, Union of South Africa, by Herbert Baker, completed.
- Church of the Holy Spirit, Vienna, by Jože Plečnik, completed.
- Kelling Hall, Norfolk, England, designed by Edward Maufe, completed.
- Scheu House and Horner House, Vienna, both designed by Adolf Loos, completed.
- Heijplaat worker's housing for Rotterdamsche Droogdok Maatschappij in the Netherlands, planned by Herman Ambrosius Jan Baanders, is begun.
- Interiors of Café Capua, Herrenmodesalon Kniže and Bridge-Club-Wien, Vienna, all designed by Adolf Loos, completed.
- Halenbrücke concrete open-spandrel arch bridge over Aare between Bern and Kirchlindach in Switzerland.

== Publications ==
- Adolf Loos' Ornament and Crime is first published.

== Awards ==
- RIBA Royal Gold Medal – Reginald Blomfield.
- Grand Prix de Rome, architecture: Roger Séassal.

== Births ==
- May 20 – H. T. Cadbury-Brown, English architect (died 2009)
- September 4 – Kenzō Tange, Japanese architect (died 2005)
- October 20 – Alejandro de la Sota, Spanish architect (died 1996)
- October 25 – Raymond Berg, Australian architect (died 1989)
- November 2 – Erik Asmussen, Danish-born architect (died 1998)

== Deaths ==
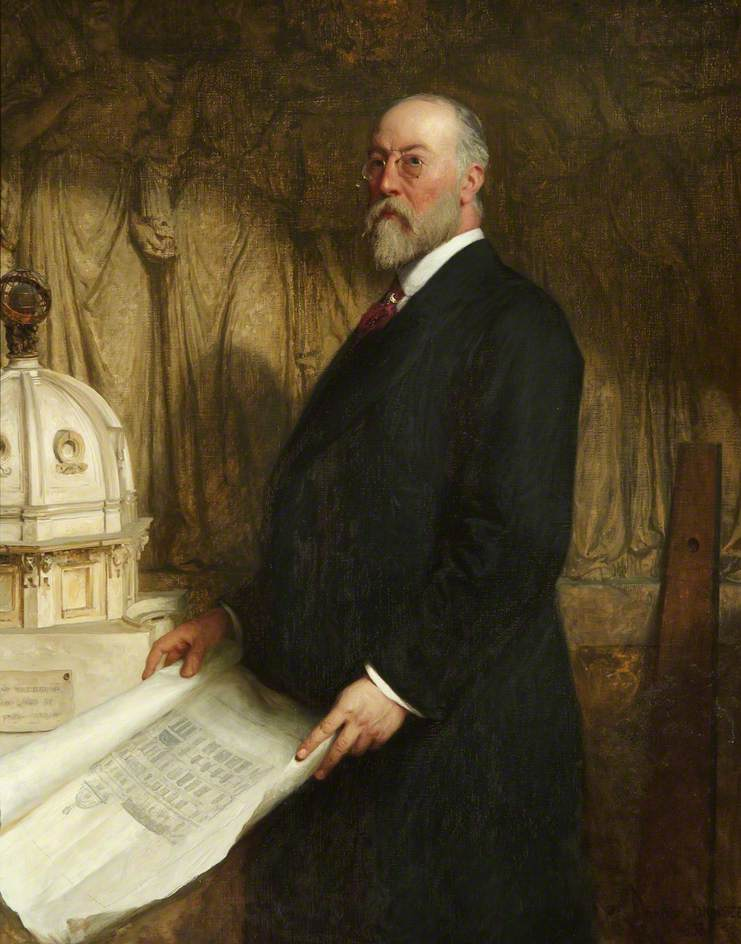
John Belcher

- May 30 – John Oldrid Scott, English architect (born 1841)
- August 27 — Charles Babcock, American Architect (born 1829)
- November 8 – John Belcher, English architect (born 1841)
- November 28 – George B. Post, American architect (born 1837)
