= 1919 in architecture =

List of years in architecture	(table)
- … 1909; 1910; 1911; 1912; 1913; 1914; 1915; 1916; 1917; 1918; 1919; 1920; 1921; 1922; 1923; 1924; 1925; 1926; 1927; 1928; 1929 …
- Buildings and structures: Art; Archaeology; Architecture; Literature; Music; Philosophy; Science; +...

The year 1919 in architecture involved some significant architectural events and new buildings.

== Events ==
- 25 April – The Bauhaus architectural and design movement is founded in Weimar, Germany, by Walter Gropius.
- November – Start of the Glass Chain correspondence.
- Julia Morgan is selected as the architect for William Randolph Hearst's La Cuesta Encantada, better known as Hearst Castle, in San Simeon, California, USA.

== Buildings and structures ==
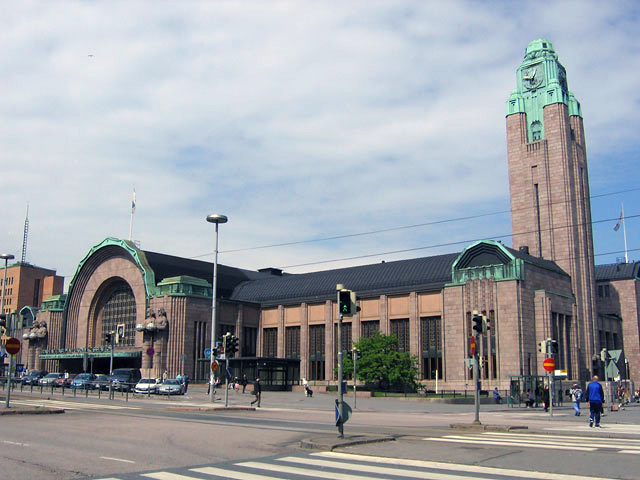
Helsinki station, Finland

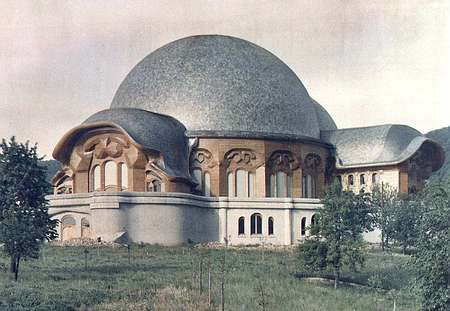
First Goetheanum in Dornach, Switzerland

=== Buildings opened ===
- 5 March – Rebuilt Helsinki Central railway station, designed by Eliel Saarinen.
- April – First Congregational Church of Albany, New York, USA, designed by Albert W. Fuller.
- September – Brooklyn Army Terminal, New York, USA, designed by Cass Gilbert.
- 16 October – Condado Vanderbilt Hotel in San Juan, Puerto Rico.
- 11 November (Remembrance Day) – Hart House, University of Toronto, Toronto, Ontario, Canada, designed by Henry Sproatt.
- 27 November – Laie Hawaii Temple, Oahu, Hawaii, USA, dedicated.
- 29 November – Großes Schauspielhaus in Berlin with interior remodelled as a theater by Hans Poelzig.
- Church of the Madonna della Difesa, Montreal, Canada.
- McMahon Building, better known as the "World's littlest skyscraper", by J. D. McMahon, in downtown Wichita Falls, Texas.

=== Buildings completed ===
- Het Schip, Amsterdam, Netherlands, by Michel de Klerk.
- First Goetheanum, Dornach, Switzerland, by Rudolf Steiner.

== Awards ==
- RIBA Royal Gold Medal – Leonard Stokes.
- Grand Prix de Rome, architecture – Jacques Carlu and Jean-Jacques Haffner.

== Births ==
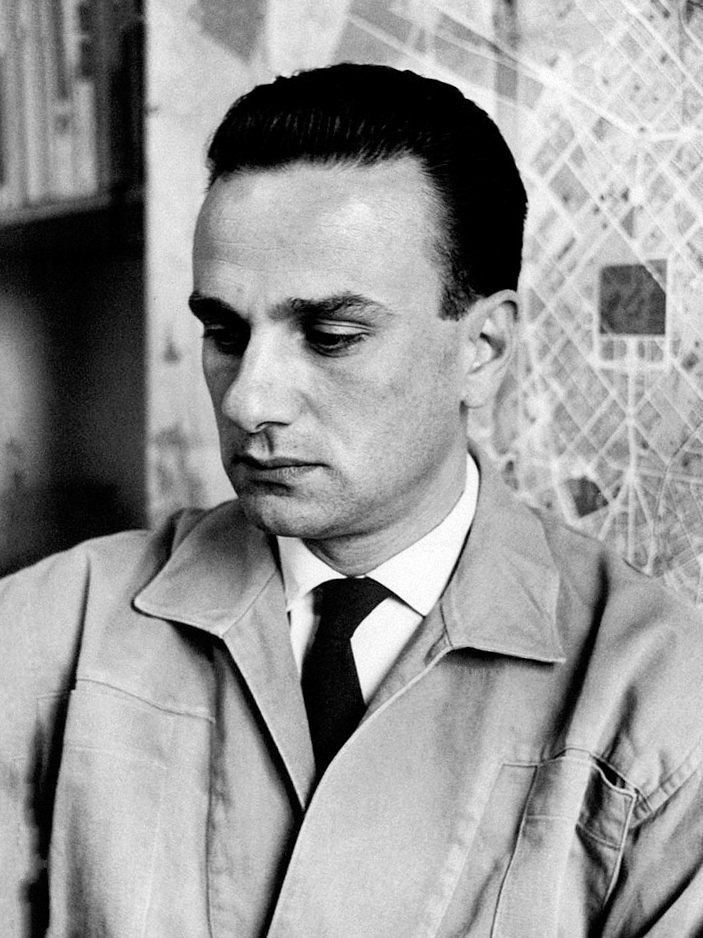
Giancarlo De Carlo

- 3 January – Robin Boyd, Australian architect (died 1971)
- 21 June – Paolo Soleri, Italian-American architect (died 2013)
- 23 July – Geoffrey Bawa, Ceylonese architect (died 2003)
- 12 December – Giancarlo De Carlo, Italian architect (died 2005)
- date unknown – Mualla Eyüboğlu, Turkish architect (died 2009)

== Deaths ==
- 26 February – Paul Due, Norwegian architect of railway stations (born 1835)
- 12 August – Ernest Gimson, English "Arts and Crafts" architect and furniture designer (born 1864)
- 5 September – Frigyes Schulek, Hungarian architect (born 1841)
- 15 October – Adolf W. Edelsvärd, Swedish architect (born 1824)
- 6 November – Hans Christian Amberg, Danish architect (born 1837)
