= 1916 in architecture =

List of years in architecture	(table)
- … 1906; 1907; 1908; 1909; 1910; 1911; 1912; 1913; 1914; 1915; 1916; 1917; 1918; 1919; 1920; 1921; 1922; 1923; 1924; 1925; 1926 …
- Buildings and structures: Art; Archaeology; Architecture; Literature; Music; Philosophy; Science; +...

The year 1916 in architecture involved some significant events.

== Buildings and structures ==
=== Buildings ===
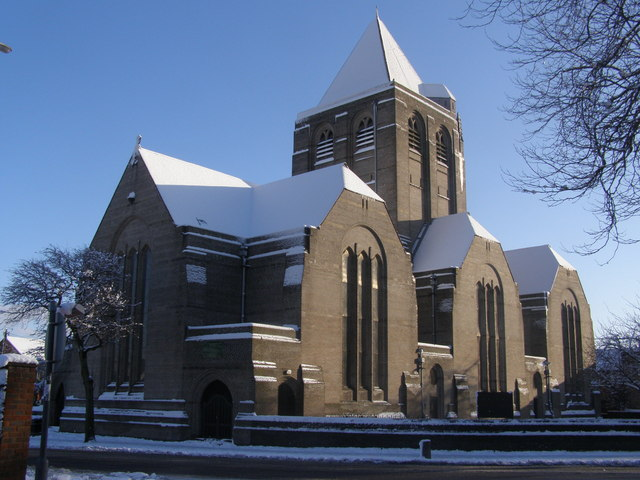
Giles Gilbert Scott's Church of St Paul, Liverpool completed

- Colony Club at Park Avenue & 62nd Streer in New York City by Delano & Aldrich with interiors by Elsie de Wolfe, later the East Coast school of the American Academy of Dramatic Arts, completed.
- Main building of St Hugh's College, Oxford in England by Herbert Tudor Buckland and William Haywood completed.
- Church of St Paul, Liverpool in England by Giles Gilbert Scott completed.
- Holland House (shipping company offices) in the City of London, designed by Hendrik Petrus Berlage, completed.
- Las Lajas Shrine in Colombia, begun; completed 1949.

== Events ==
- c. November – The Incorporation of Architects in Scotland founded in Edinburgh.
- Publication of the White Pine Series of Architectural Monographs is initiated, continuing until 1940.

== Awards ==
- RIBA Royal Gold Medal – Robert Rowand Anderson.
- Grand Prix de Rome, architecture: not held.

== Births ==
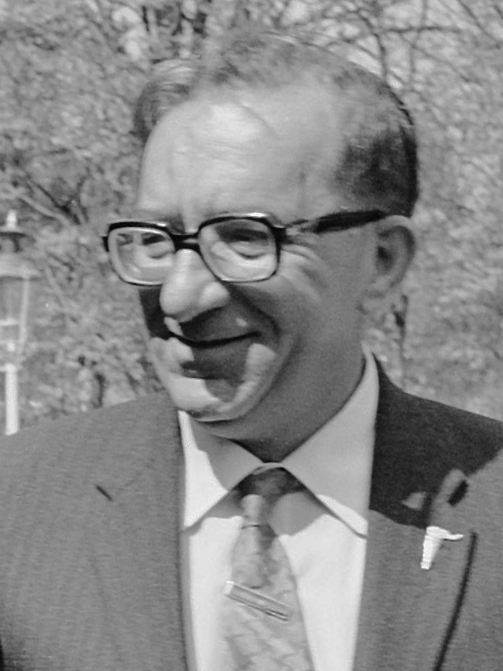
Dom Mintoff

- January 23 – Olaf Andreas Gulbransson, German architect (d. 1961)
- April 4 – Robert S. McMillan, American architect (d. 2001)
- May 4 – Jane Jacobs, American-Canadian urban theorist (d. 2006)
- May 21 – Leonard Manasseh, Singapore-born British architect (d. 2017)
- June 29 – John M. Johansen, American architect (d. 2012)
- July 1 – Lawrence Halprin, American architect (d. 2009)
- August 6 – Dom Mintoff, Maltese architect and Prime Minister (d. 2012)
- November 1 – John C. Harkness, American architect (d. 2016)
- November 9 – Richard Tyler, British architect (d. 2009)
- Dewi-Prys Thomas, British architect (d. 1985)

== Deaths ==
- March 22 – Ferdinand Fellner, Austrian architect (b. 1847)
- June – Addison Hutton, American architect (b. 1834)
- July 1 – First Day on the Somme (killed in action)
  - Eugene Bourdon, French architect (b. 1870)
  - Gilbert Waterhouse, English architect and war poet (b. 1883)
- July 22 – Hans Jørgen Holm, Danish architect (b. 1835)
- October 10 – Antonio Sant'Elia, Italian architect (killed in action) (b. 1888)
- December 22 – Gyula Pártos, Hungarian architect (b. 1845)
