= 2013 in architecture =

The year 2013 in architecture involved some significant architectural events and new buildings.

== Events ==
- March 1 – The first phase of the Old Port of Marseille renewal is inaugurated.
- March 28 – Paradise Center, in Sofia, the largest shopping mall in Bulgaria.
- April 13 – The Rijksmuseum in Amsterdam reopens its doors after a 10-year restoration and renovation project.
- April 24 – The late-11th-century minaret of the Great Mosque of Aleppo is destroyed during Syrian civil war fighting.
- May 10 – One World Trade Center becomes the tallest building in the United States and the third-tallest building in the world by pinnacle height (not yet complete).
- June 12 – The Berlin City Palace foundation stone laying ceremony is held in Berlin. The building is expected to be completed in 2019.
- July 11 – Work begins on a Lego model of Durham Cathedral in England, the beginning of a huge fund-raising effort.
- August 3 – The Shanghai Tower, topping out ceremony is held in Shanghai. The tallest building in China and the second-tallest in the world is expected to be completed in 2015.
- October – The sixth World Architecture Festival is held in Singapore.
- November 12 – The Height Committee of the Chicago-based Council on Tall Buildings and Urban Habitat (CTBUH) makes the controversial announcement that One World Trade Center is the tallest building in the United States at 1,776 feet, declaring that the mast on top of the building is a spire since it is a permanent part of the building's architecture.

== Buildings and structures ==
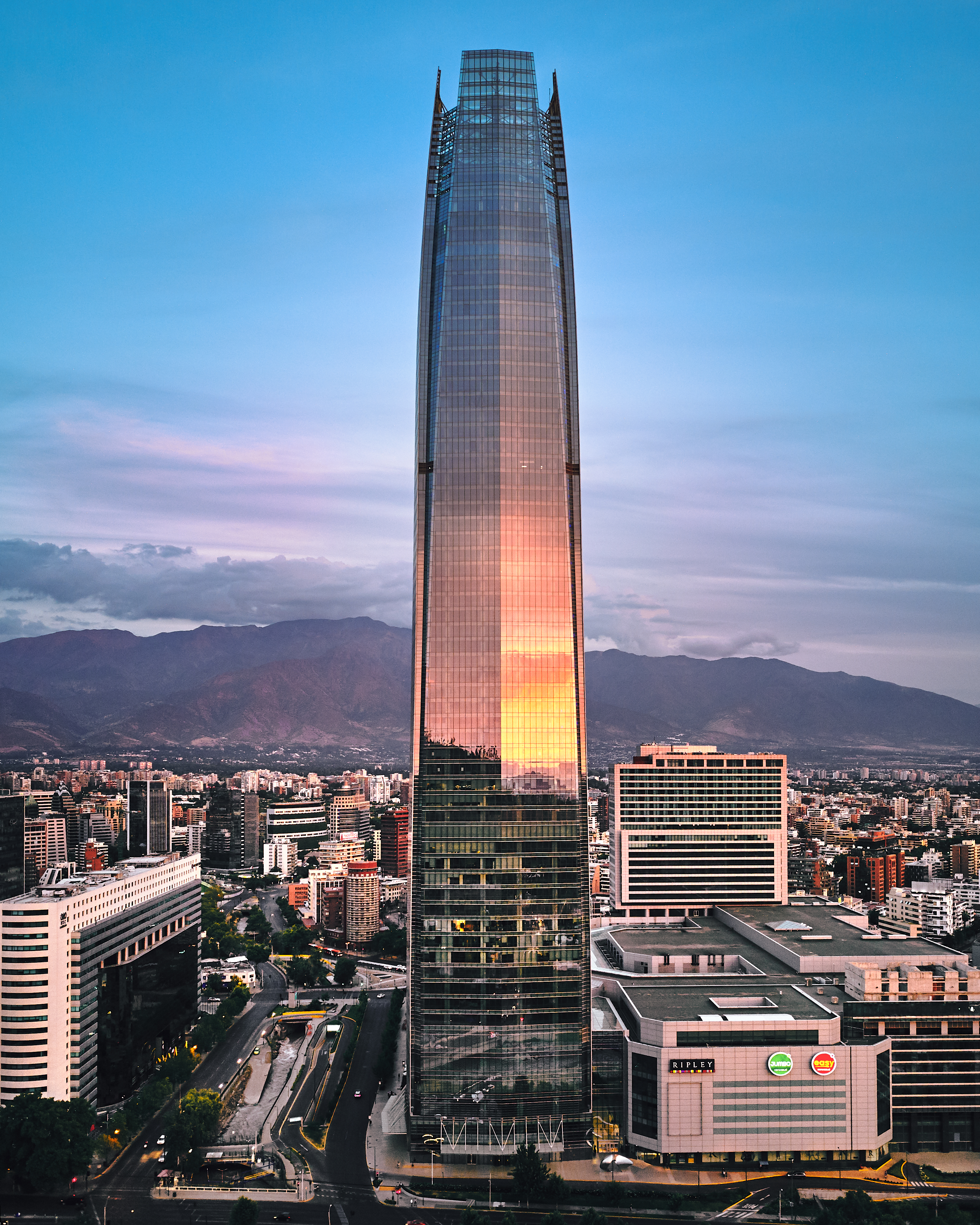
Gran Torre Santiago

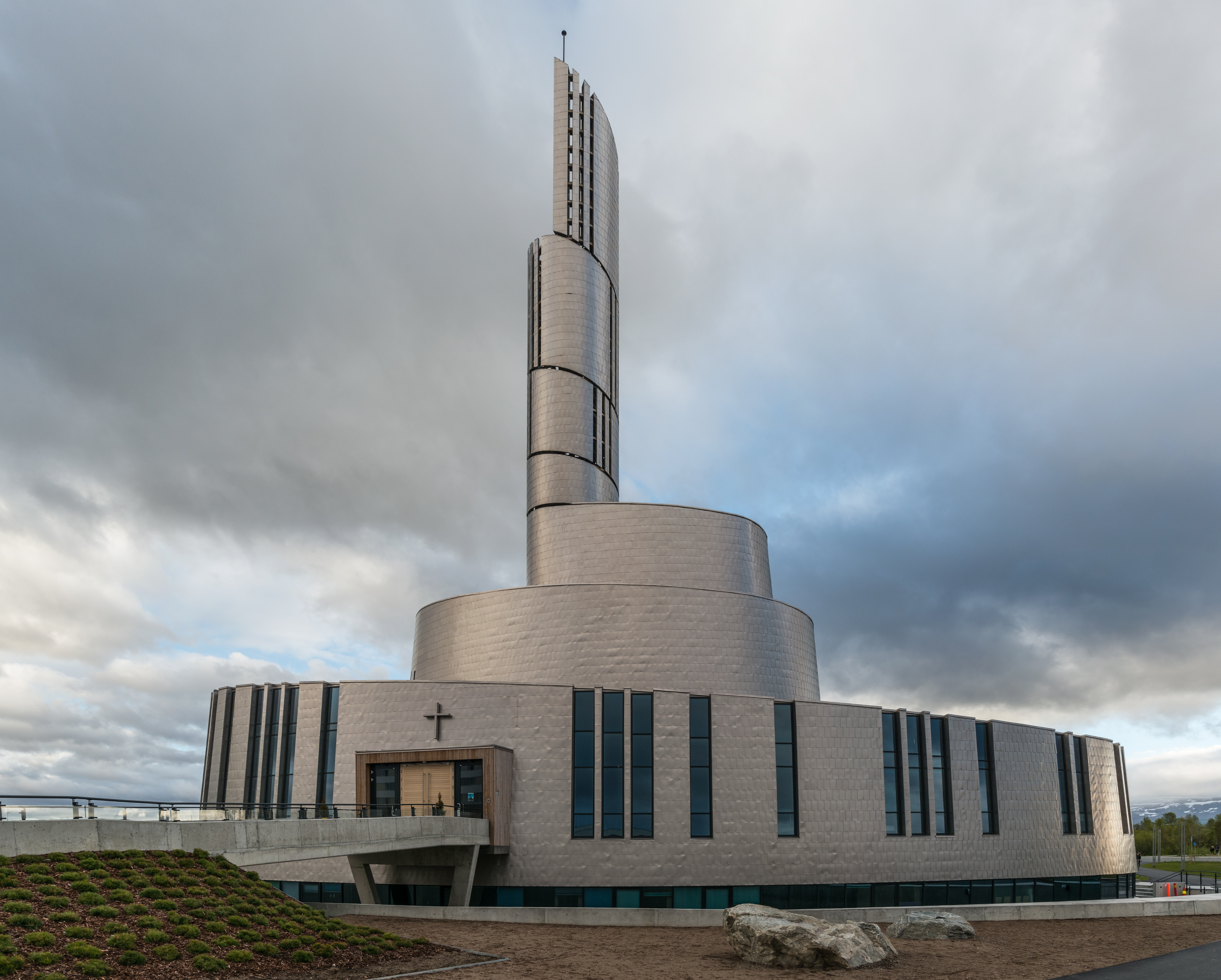
Northern Lights Cathedral in Alta, Norway

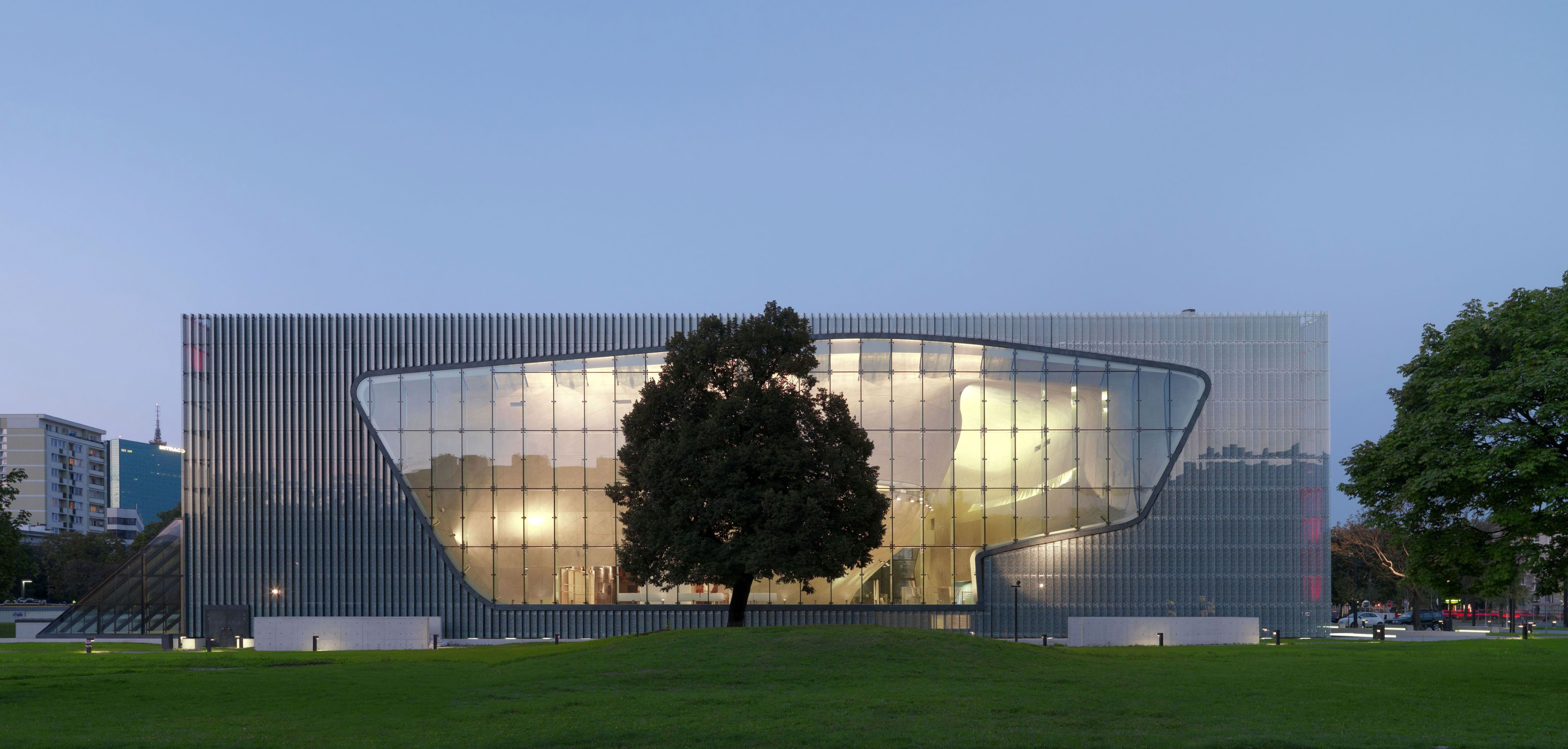
POLIN Museum of the History of Polish Jews, in Warsaw, Poland

=== Buildings opened ===
Bulgaria

- September – Dorkovo Museum.

Chile

- Gran Torre Santiago, the second tallest building in the Southern Hemisphere, is completed.

Denmark

- March – New building for the National Aquarium Denmark, designed by 3XN, in Copenhagen.

France

- June 1 – Museum of European and Mediterranean Civilisations national museum in Marseille, in the South of France, designed by Rudy Ricciotti.

Germany

- May – Extension to Lenbachhaus art museum, designed by Foster and Partners, in Munich.

Mexico

- November 19 – Museo Júmex, Mexico City, designed by David Chipperfield.

New Zealand

- August 2 – Cardboard Cathedral in Christchurch, designed by Shigeru Ban with Warren and Mahoney.

Norway

- February 10 – Northern Lights Cathedral in Alta, designed by Link Arkitektur with Schmidt Hammer Lassen Architects.

Poland

- April 19 – Museum of the History of Polish Jews, designed by Rainer Mahlamäki, in Warsaw.

Singapore

- The Sandcrawler – designed by Aedas.

Turkey

- Sancaklar Mosque in Büyükçekmece, Istanbul, designed by Emre Arolat.
- October 29 – The Marmaray rail tunnel under the Bosphorus strait, the world's deepest undersea immersed tube tunnel, Istanbul.

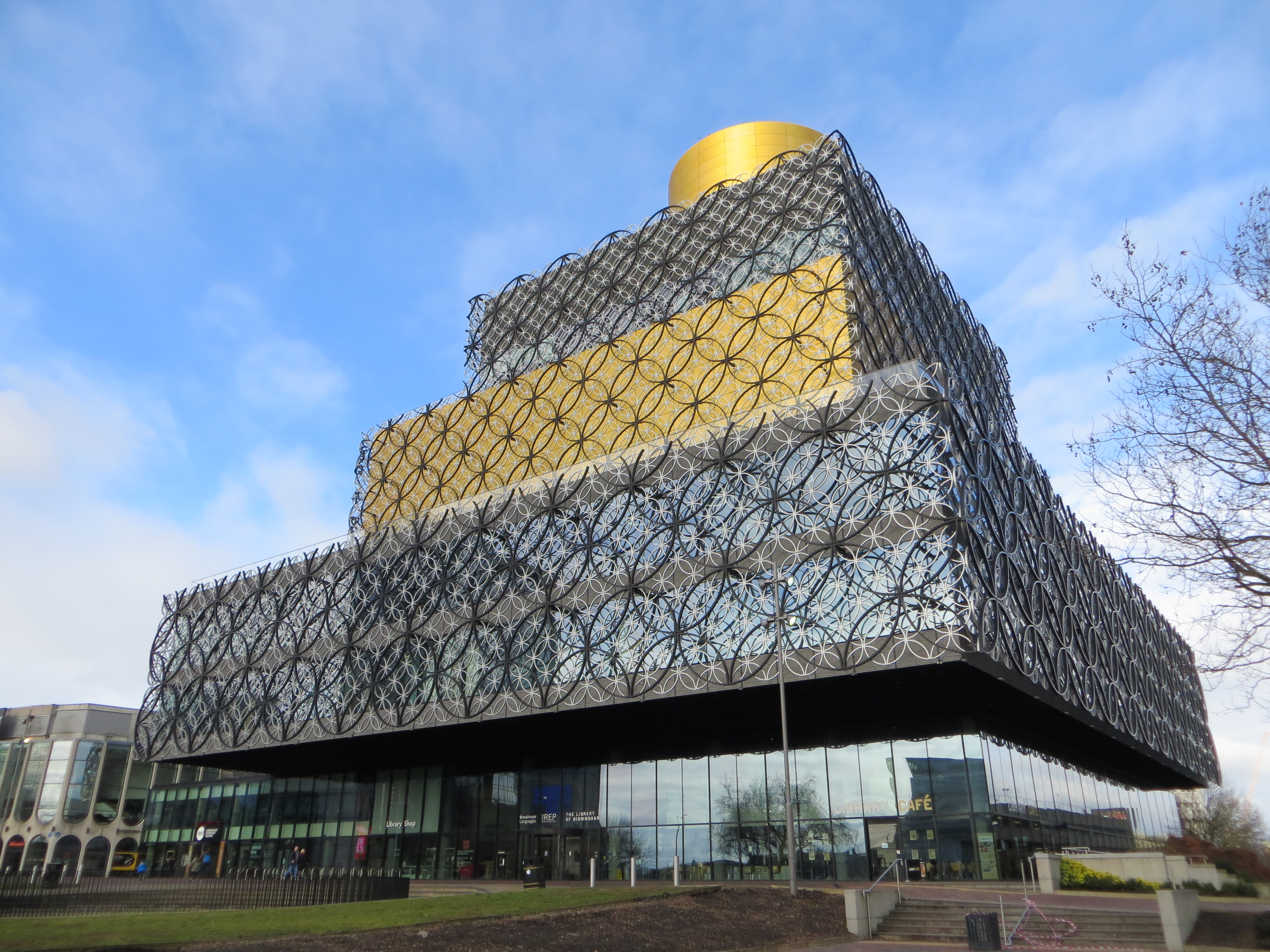
The Library of Birmingham, United Kingdom

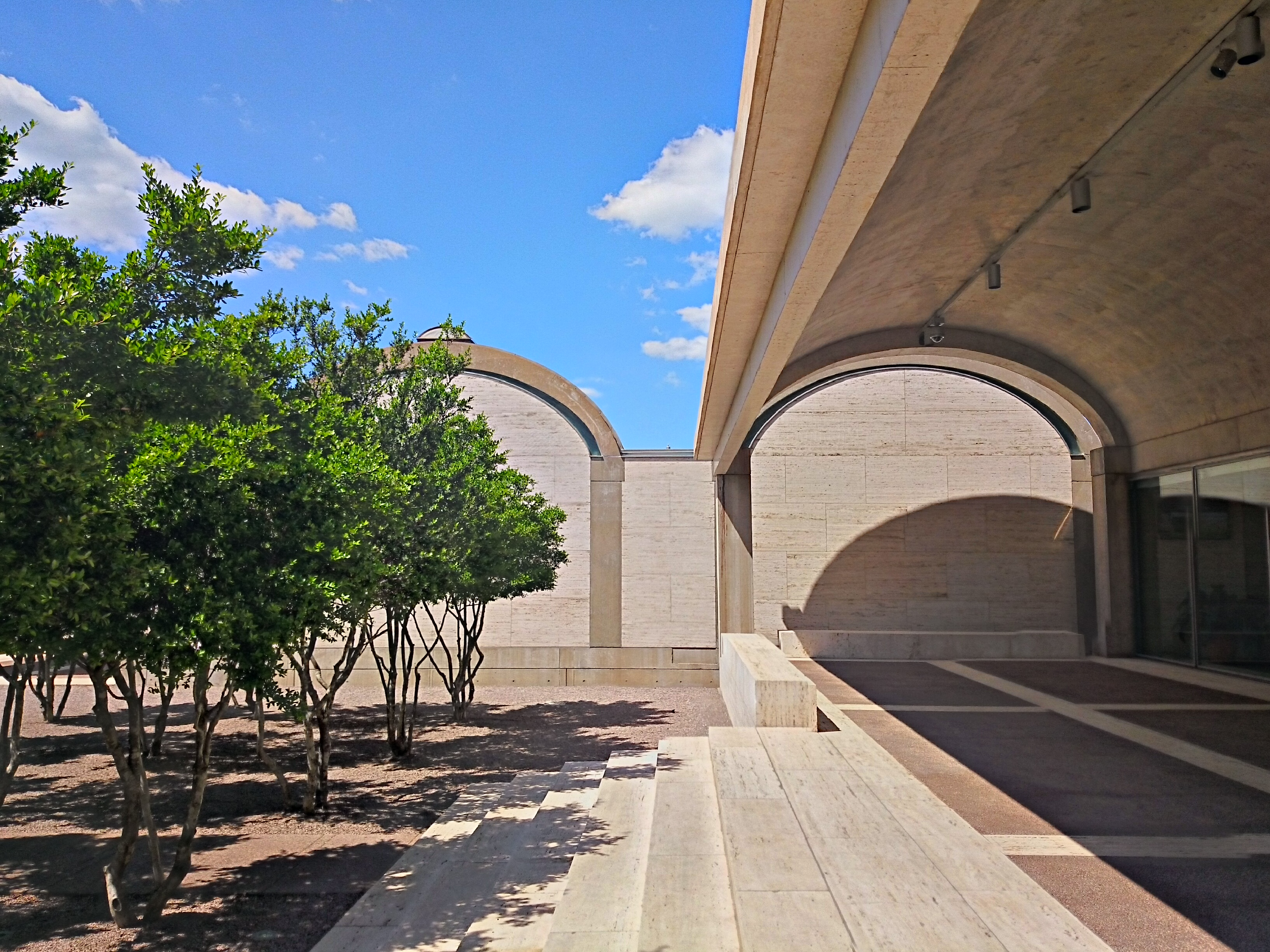
Kimbell Art Museum in Fort Worth, Texas

United Kingdom

- February 1 – Bishop Edward King Chapel at Ripon College Cuddesdon in Oxfordshire, England, designed by Níall McLaughlin Architects, is dedicated.
- March – Number One Riverside civic offices in Rochdale, designed by FaulknerBrowns Architects, opens to the public.
- April – The Shed temporary auditorium for the National Theatre on the South Bank in London, by Haworth Tompkins.
- May 30 – Mary Rose Museum, designed by Wilkinson Eyre Architects and Perkins+Will, at Portsmouth Historic Dockyard in England.
- June 28 – Scale Lane Bridge over River Hull in the UK, designed by McDowell+Benedetti with engineers Alan Baxter Associates and Qualter Hall.
- September 3 – Library of Birmingham, the largest public library in the United Kingdom, designed by Mecanoo.
- September 30 – SSE Hydro arena in Glasgow, Scotland, designed by Foster and Partners.

United States

- January – James B. Hunt Jr. Library the main library of Centennial Campus of North Carolina State University, designed by Snøhetta, in Raleigh, North Carolina.
- April 25 – The George W. Bush Presidential Center in Dallas, Texas.
- November 27 – Kimbell Art Museum expansion, named the Renzo Piano Pavilion, designed by Renzo Piano, in Fort Worth, Texas, is officially inaugurated.
- December 4 – Pérez Art Museum Miami, designed by Herzog & de Meuron, in Miami.

=== Buildings completed ===
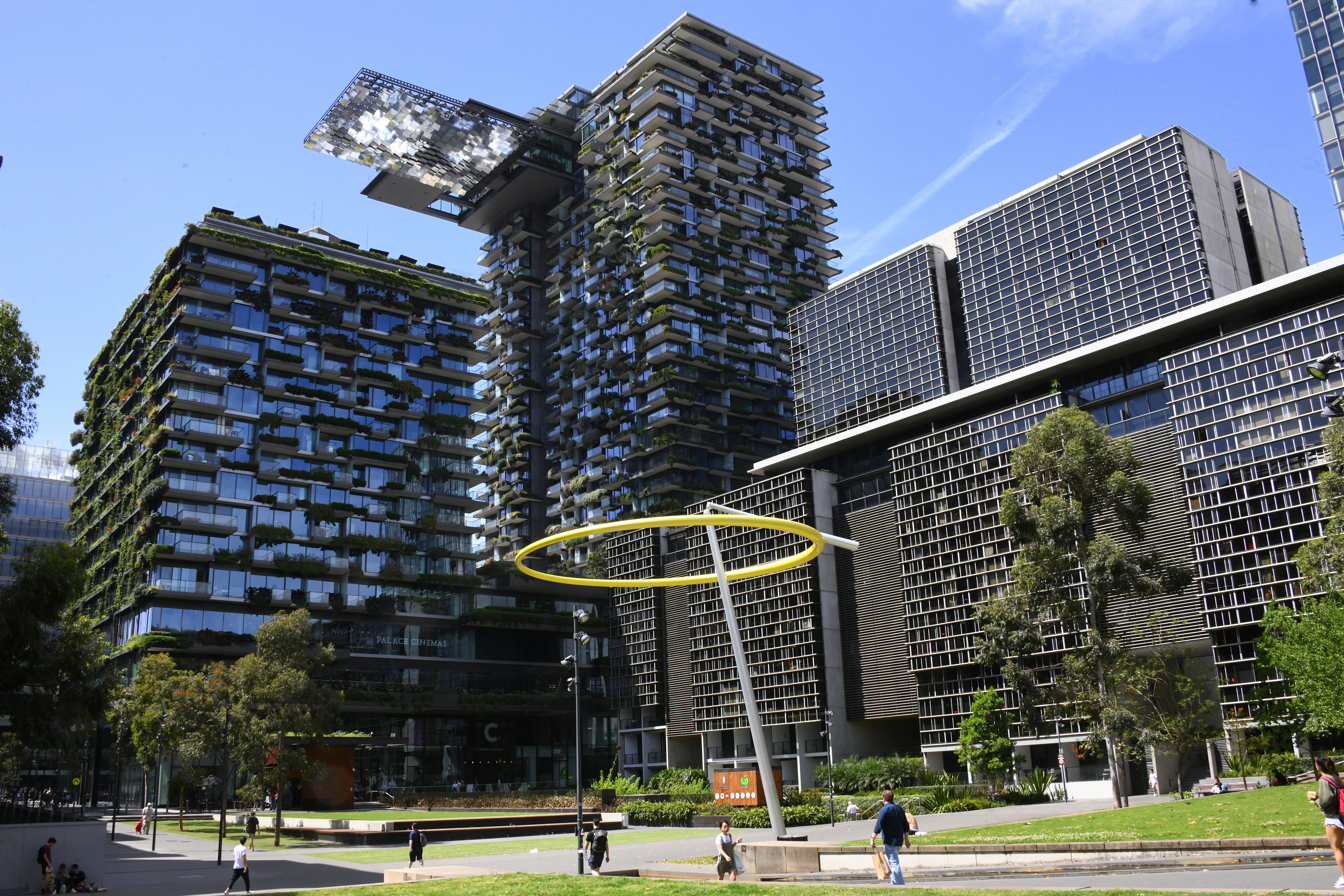
One Central Park in Sydney, Australia

Australia

- One Central Park, design by Foster and Partners, Ateliers Jean Nouvel and PTW Architects.

China

- Chongqing Art Museum, designed by China Architecture Design & Research Group.

Russia

- Mercury City Tower, in Moscow, the tallest building in Europe.

United Arab Emirates

- June 10 – Cayan Tower in Dubai Marina, the world's tallest tower featuring a 90-degree twist.

United Kingdom

- December 18 – Stonehenge Visitor Centre, Wiltshire, England, designed by Denton Corker Marshall.
- Burntwood School in Wandsworth (London), by Allford Hall Monaghan Morris.
- Tate Britain renovation in London, by Caruso St John.

United States

- November 13 – Four World Trade Center, New York City.
- unknown date – One Madison residential condominium tower in New York City, designed by CetraRuddy.

== Awards ==
- AIA Architecture Firm Award – Tod Williams Billie Tsien Architects
- AIA Gold Medal – Thom Mayne
- Emporis Skyscraper Award – The Shard designed by Renzo Piano
- European Union Prize for Contemporary Architecture (Mies van der Rohe Prize) – The Harpa concert hall in Reykjavík by Henning Larsen Architects
- Driehaus Architecture Prize for New Classical Architecture – Thomas H. Beeby
- Lawrence Israel Prize – Roman and Williams
- LEAF Award, Overall Winner – archi5
- Praemium Imperiale Architecture Laureate – David Chipperfield
- Pritzker Architecture Prize – Toyo Ito.
- Reed Award for classical architecture commitment – David Watkin
- RAIA Gold Medal – Peter Wilson
- RIBA Royal Gold Medal – Peter Zumthor
- Stirling Prize – Witherford Watson Mann for restoration of Astley Castle in North Warwickshire, England (2012)
- Thomas Jefferson Medal in Architecture – Laurie Olin
- Twenty-five Year Award by AIA – Renzo Piano for Menil Collection

== Exhibitions ==
- June 15 until September 23 – Le Corbusier: An Atlas of Modern Landscapes at Museum of Modern Art in New York City

== Deaths ==
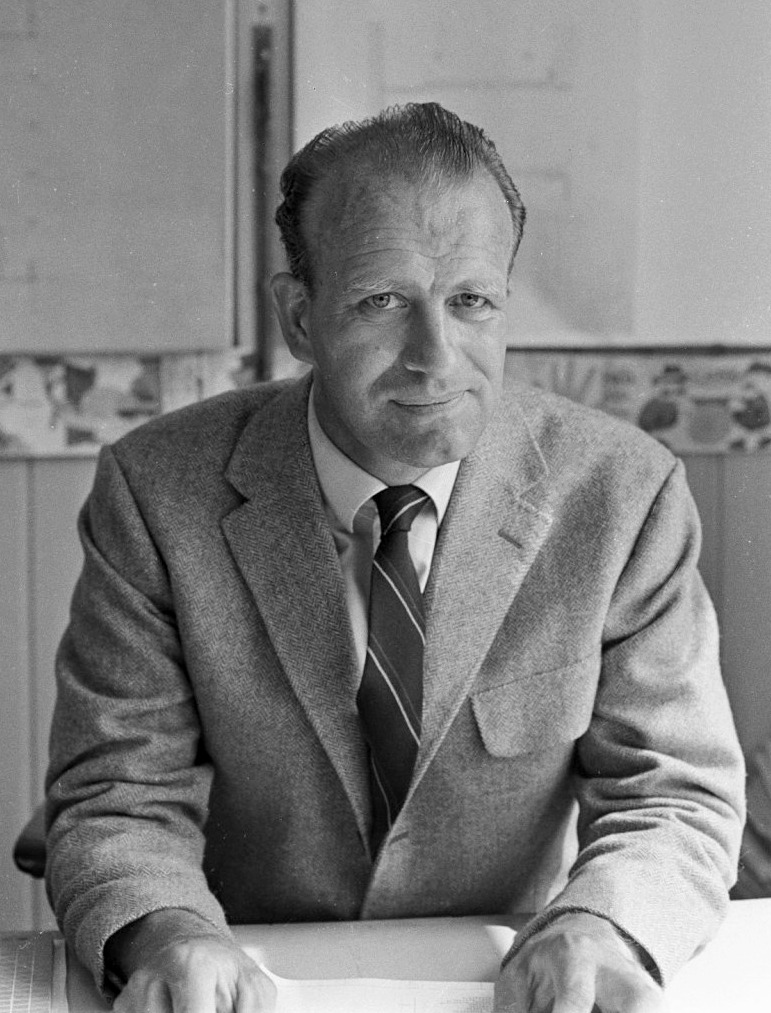
Henning Larsen

- January 5 – Bruce McCarty, American architect (born 1920)
- January 7 – Ada Louise Huxtable, American architecture critic (The New York Times) (born 1921)
- February 25 – Heikki Siren, Finnish architect (born 1918)
- March 7 – Elmar Tampõld, Estonian-Canadian architect (born 1920)
- April 9 – Paolo Soleri, Italian architect (born 1919)
- April 11
  - Ram Karmi, Israeli architect (born 1931)
  - Clorindo Testa, Italian-born Argentine architect and artist (born 1923)
- April 16 – Pedro Ramírez Vázquez, Mexican architect (born 1919)
- April 20 – Rick Mather, American-born UK-based architect (born 1937)
- June 18 – Colin Stansfield Smith, British architect and academic (born 1932)
- June 22 – , Danish architect (born 1925)
- October 30 – Anca Petrescu, Romanian architect and politician (born 1949)
- November 13 – Roland Paoletti, British architect (born 1931)
- December 5 – Fred Bassetti, American architect (born 1917)

== See also ==
- Timeline of architecture
