= 2005 in architecture =

The year 2005 in architecture involved some significant architectural events and new buildings.

== Events ==
- May 17 – The renovation and restoration of Mies van der Rohe's Crown Hall at the Illinois Institute of Technology commences with the smashing of the first of the large glass walls, a privilege auctioned on eBay for over $2,500.
- May 20 – The United States Postal Service honors twelve "Masterworks of Modern Architecture" on first class postage stamps.
- October 6–10 – Demolition of the last of the Xanadu Houses.

== Buildings and structures ==
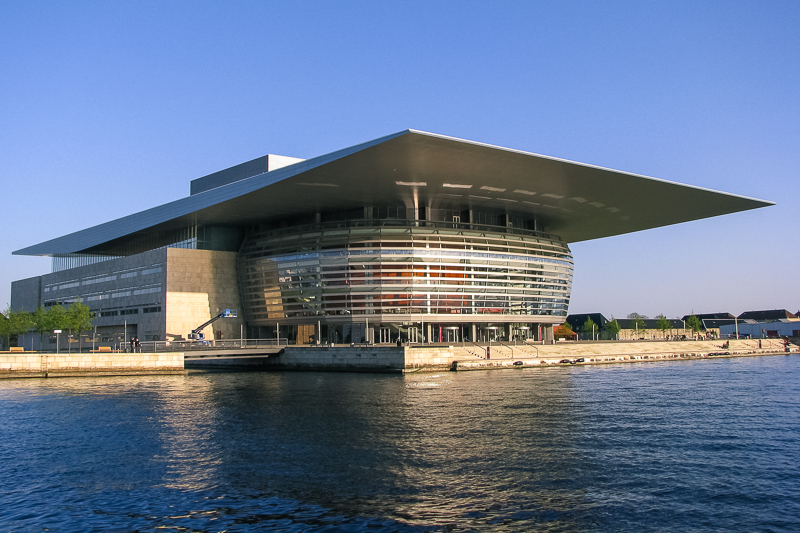
Copenhagen Opera House, Denmark

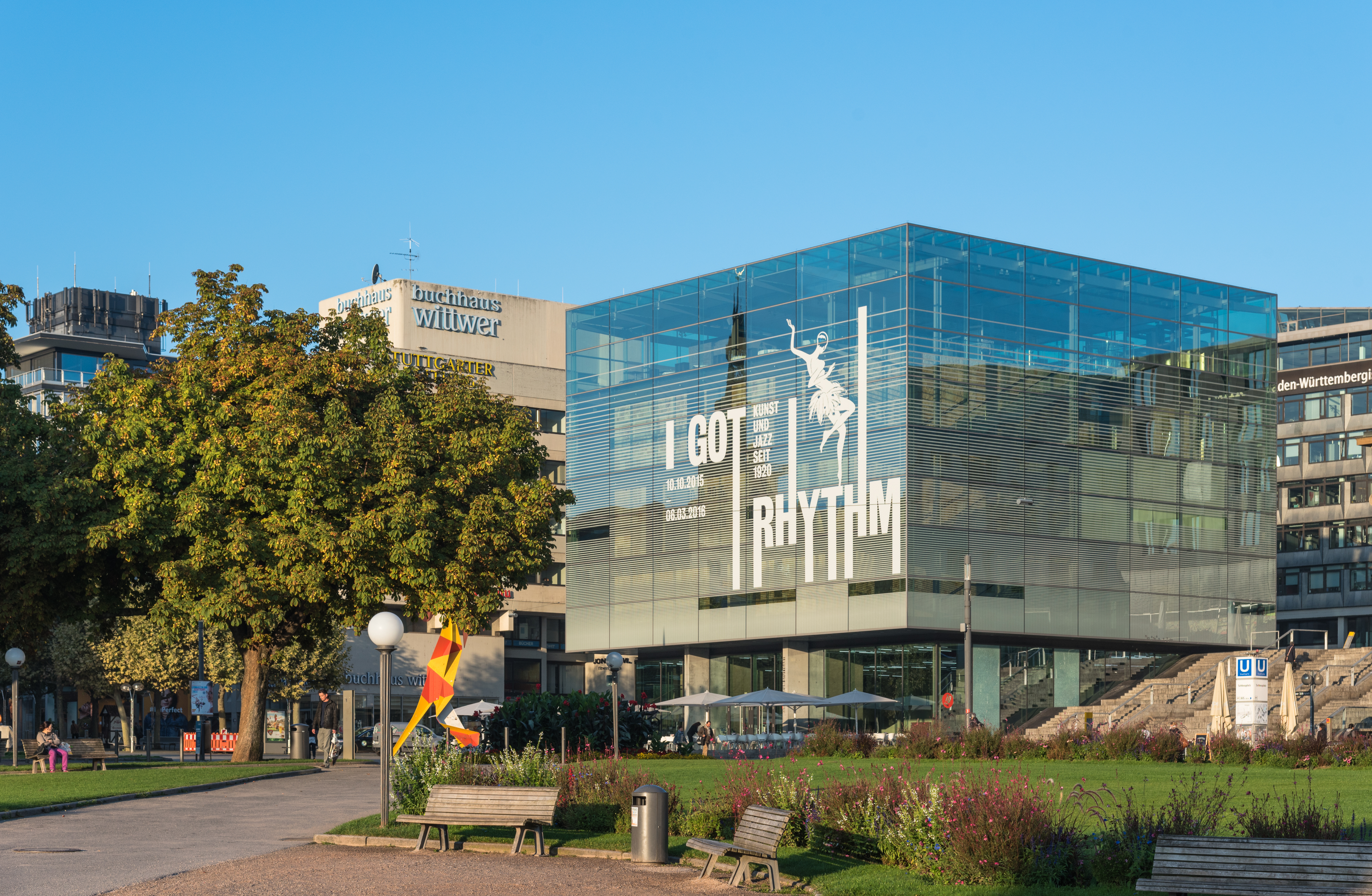
Kunstmuseum Stuttgart, Germany

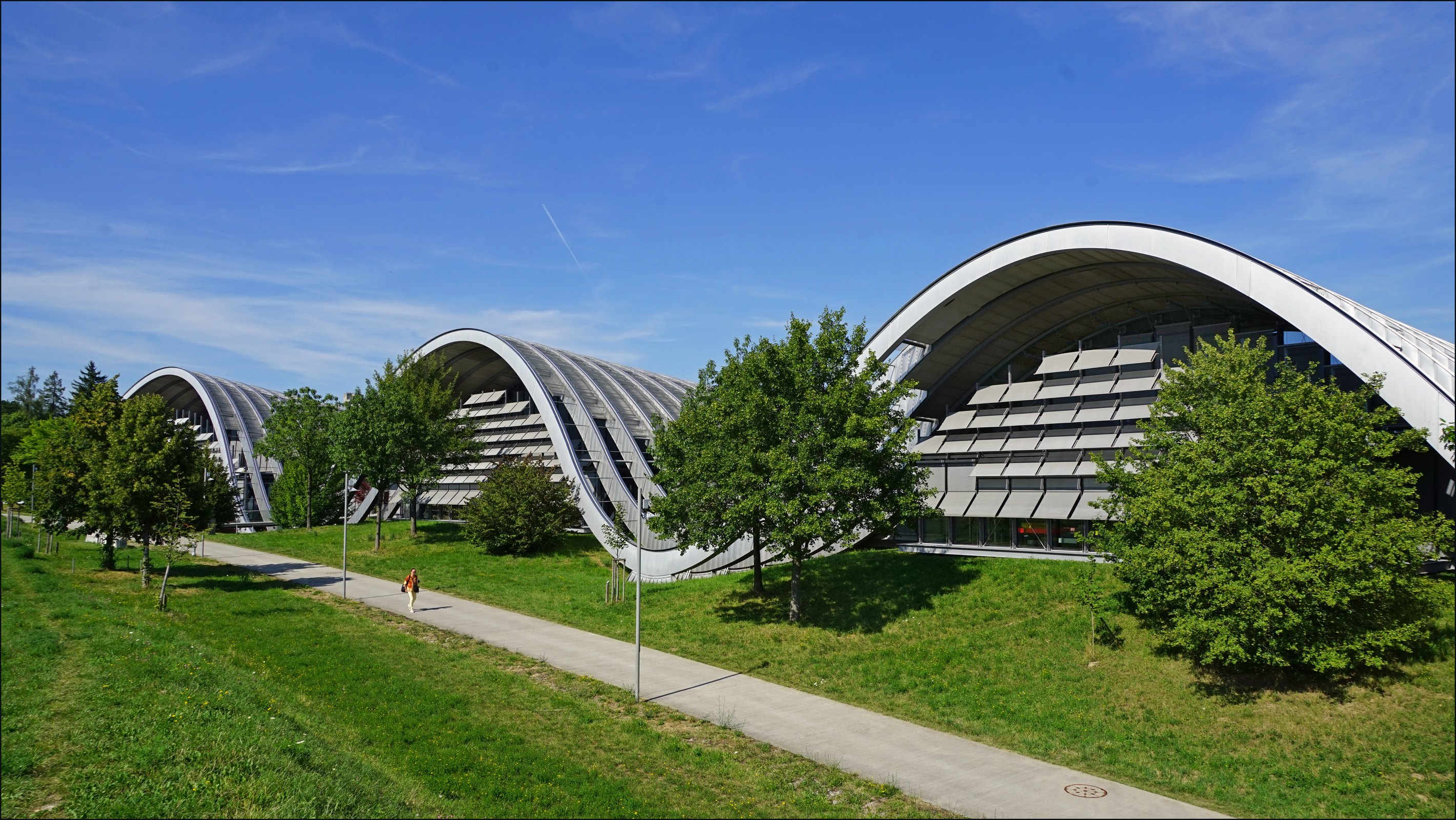
Zentrum Paul Klee in Bern, Switzerland

=== Buildings opened ===
- January 15 – Copenhagen Opera House, Denmark, designed by Henning Larsen.
- March 5 – The Kunstmuseum Stuttgart, Germany, designed by Hascher et Jehle.
- April 6 – New facility for the Milan Trade Fair in Milan, Italy, designed by Massimiliano Fuksas.
- April 14 – Casa da Música, Porto, Portugal, designed by Rem Koolhaas's OMA.
- April 17 – Expansion of the Walker Art Center in Minneapolis, Minnesota, designed by Herzog & de Meuron.
- April 28 – The Wynn Las Vegas, designed by Jon Jerde.
- May 10 – Memorial to the Murdered Jews of Europe in Berlin, designed by Peter Eisenman.
- May 11 – Southeast Asian Ceramics Museum at Bangkok University, Thailand, designed by Architects 49.
- May 30 – Allianz Arena in Munich, Germany, designed by Herzog & de Meuron.
- June – Zentrum Paul Klee, Bern, Switzerland, designed by Renzo Piano.
- July 22 – Tower of St Edmundsbury Cathedral in Bury St Edmunds, England.
- August 27 – The Turning Torso in Malmö, designed by Santiago Calatrava, the tallest building in Sweden and Scandinavia (2005–present).
- September – Idea Store Whitechapel, London, UK designed by David Adjaye Associates.
- October 8 – Palau de les Arts Reina Sofía, Valencia, designed by Santiago Calatrava.
- October 15 – New de Young Museum in San Francisco, California, USA, designed by Herzog & de Meuron.
- October 17–18 – National Waterfront Museum, Swansea, UK, designed by Wilkinson Eyre.
- October 30 – The reconstructed Dresden Frauenkirche, in Dresden, Germany, is consecrated.
- specific date not listed
  - Bloomberg Tower in Manhattan, New York, United States is completed.
  - 2 Marsham Street in London, designed by Terry Farrell, is first occupied by the British government department, the Home Office, for whom it was built.
  - Maggie's Centre at Inverness in the Scottish Highlands, a drop-in cancer care centre designed by Page\Park Architects.

=== Buildings completed ===
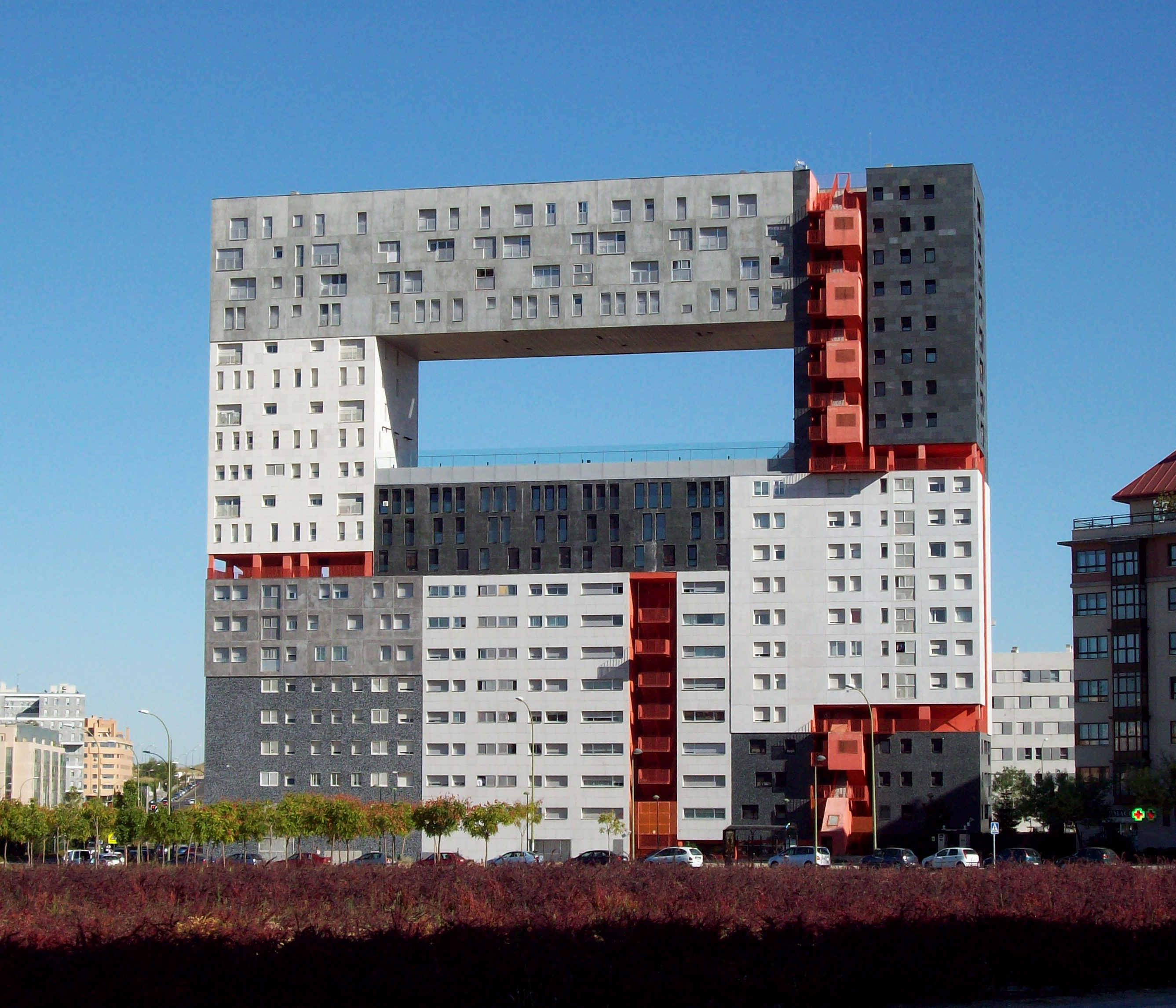
Edificio Mirador in Madrid, Spain

- date unknown
  - The Chongqing World Trade Center in Chongqing, China.
  - Chelsea Tower in Dubai, United Arab Emirates.
  - Q1 Tower in Surfers Paradise, Queensland, the tallest building in Australia (2005–present).
  - Mirador apartment building in Madrid, Spain, designed by MVRDV and Blanca Lleó.
  - Tromsø Library and City Archives in Norway, designed by Kjell Beite.
  - Jaume Fuster Library in Barcelona, Spain, designed by Josep Llinás.
  - Alton Library, Alton, Hampshire, England, designed by Hampshire County Architects.
  - Santa Caterina Market roof in Barcelona, designed by Enric Miralles Benedetta Tagliabue.
  - Antvorskov Church, Slagelse, Denmark, designed by Regnbuen Arkitekter.
  - St. Henry's Chapel, Turku, Finland, designed by Matti Sanaksenaho.
  - Private residences
    - Casa Poli, Concepción, Chile, designed by Pezo von Ellrichshausen.
    - Copper House 2, Talca, Chile, designed by Smiljan Radić Clarke.
    - Pite House, Papudo, Chile, designed by Smiljan Radić Clarke.
    - Casa Tóló, Lugar das Carvalhinhas, Portugal, designed by Álvaro Siza Vieira.
    - Haus Bold, Bad Waldsee, Germany, designed by Thomas Bendel.
    - Light House, Notting Hill, London, designed by Gianni Botsford.

== Awards ==
- AIA Gold Medal – Santiago Calatrava
- Architecture Firm Award – Murphy/Jahn
- AIA Twenty-five Year Award – Yale Center for British Art, New Haven, Connecticut by Louis Kahn
- Driehaus Architecture Prize – Quinlan Terry
- Emporis Skyscraper Award – Turning Torso by Santiago Calatrava
- European Union Prize for Contemporary Architecture (Mies van der Rohe Prize) – Rem Koolhaas for Netherlands Embassy Berlin
- Grand Prix de l'urbanisme – Bernard Reichen
- LEAF Award, Grand Prix – Henning Larsen Architects for the IT University of Copenhagen
- Mies van der Rohe Prize – Rem Koolhaas for the Dutch Embassy (Berlin)
- Praemium Imperiale Architecture Award – Yoshio Taniguchi
- Pritzker Prize – Thom Mayne, of Morphosis
- Prix de l'Équerre d'Argent – Florence Lipsky and Pascal Rollet for the Science Library at Orléans-la-Source
- RAIA Gold Medal – James Birrell
- RIAS Award for Architecture – Scottish Parliament building, Edinburgh, designed by EMBT & RMJM
- RIBA Royal Gold Medal – Frei Otto
- Stirling Prize – Scottish Parliament building, Edinburgh, designed by EMBT & RMJM
- Thomas Jefferson Medal in Architecture – Shigeru Ban
- Vincent Scully Prize – The Prince of Wales (now Charles III)
- Twenty-five Year Award – Yale Center for British Art
- UIA Gold Medal – Tadao Ando

== Deaths ==
- January 6 – A. Hays Town, prominent American residential architect based in Baton Rouge, Louisiana (born 1903)
- January 23 – Richard Feilden OBE, leading UK architect based in Bath (born 1950)
- January 25 – Philip Johnson, influential American architect, first Pritzker Prize honoree (born 1906)
- March 16 – Ralph Erskine, British architect, designer of the Byker Wall (born 1914)
- March 22 – Kenzo Tange, leading Japanese architect, winner of the 1987 Pritzker Prize (born 1913)
- June 4 – Giancarlo De Carlo, Italian architect (born 1919)
- June 30 – Robert Y. Fleming, American architect (born 1925)
- December 15 – James Ingo Freed, American architect (born 1930)

== See also ==
- Architecture Timeline
