= Dorkovo Museum =

Museum in Dorkovo, Bulgaria

- Location within Bulgaria
- Established: September 2013
- Location: Dorkovo, Pazardzhik District, Bulgaria
- Coordinates: 42.033°N 24.133°E
- Type: Paleontology museum of Pliocene epoch
- Collection size: Fossils of animals, model of gomphothere, and diorama

Dorkovo Museum in Dorkovo, Bulgaria, established in 2013 in a domed wooden structure, has a display of fossils collected from the Pliocene geological epoch of about five million years ago around the village of Dorkovo, a life-size model of a gomphothere, related to elephants, and a diorama.

== History ==
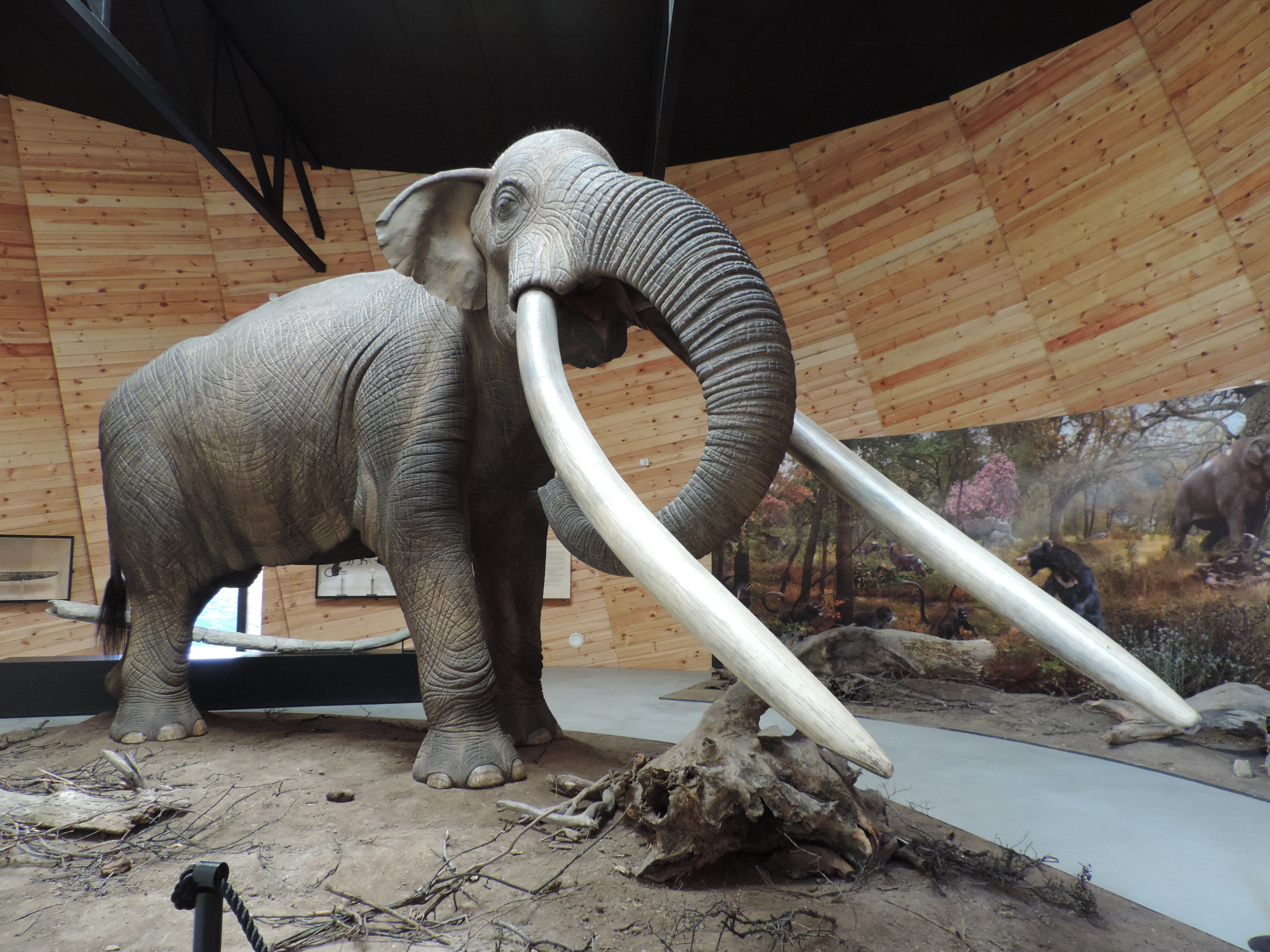
Anancus arvernensis model in the paleontological museum at Dorkovo

During 1983 a team of paleontologists from Bulgaria and France carried out excavations in and around Dorkovo in the Rhodope Mountains which unearthed fossils of 5-million-year-old prehistoric mammals of the Pliocene geological epoch. The study was supported by the National Museum of Natural History. The museum was created only 30 years later at the site by the National Museum of Natural History, artists and those associated with the excavations at Dorkovo to display the fossils, a gomphothere model and other animal sculptures, and a diorama based on the Pliocene animals and forest. Funding for the museum was provided under the regional development of the European Union (EU).

The museum was inaugurated on 19 September 2013 by Rosen Plevneliev, President of Bulgaria. It is located 150 kilometres (93 mi) from Sofia in the village of Dorkovo, Rakitovo Municipality between the town of Velingrad and the Batak Reservoir, in the Pazardzhik region.

== Features ==
The museum, set amidst the forest, showcases of some of the fossil findings of the excavations, which revealed mostly gomphotheres (extinct elephant relatives). It is housed in a domed structure made of wood both on the inner and outer surfaces, which measures 300 square metres (3,200 sq ft). Apart from the fossils collected from the field, the major attraction in the museum is model of a gomphothere of the species of Anancus arvernensis, which was made by the Simeon Stoilov Studio. It measures 4 metres (13 ft) in height. The diorama on the interior wooden walls of the museum measures 6 metres (20 ft) and was painted there by Velizar Simeonovski, the "painter-animalist" of the Field Museum, Chicago, and shows examples not only of proboscideans but also monkeys, Hipparion horses, and forests.

== Gallery ==
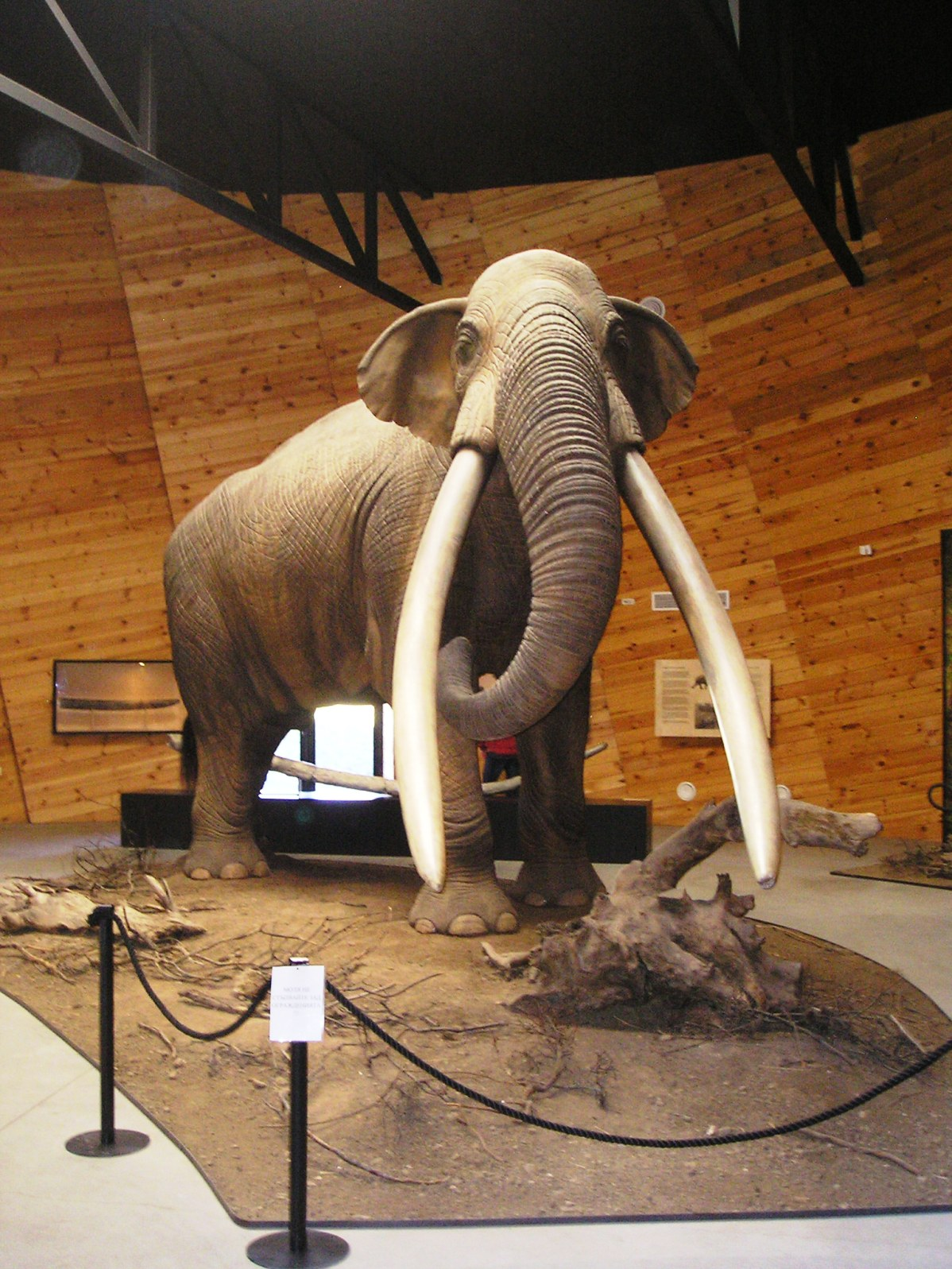
Anancus arvernensis

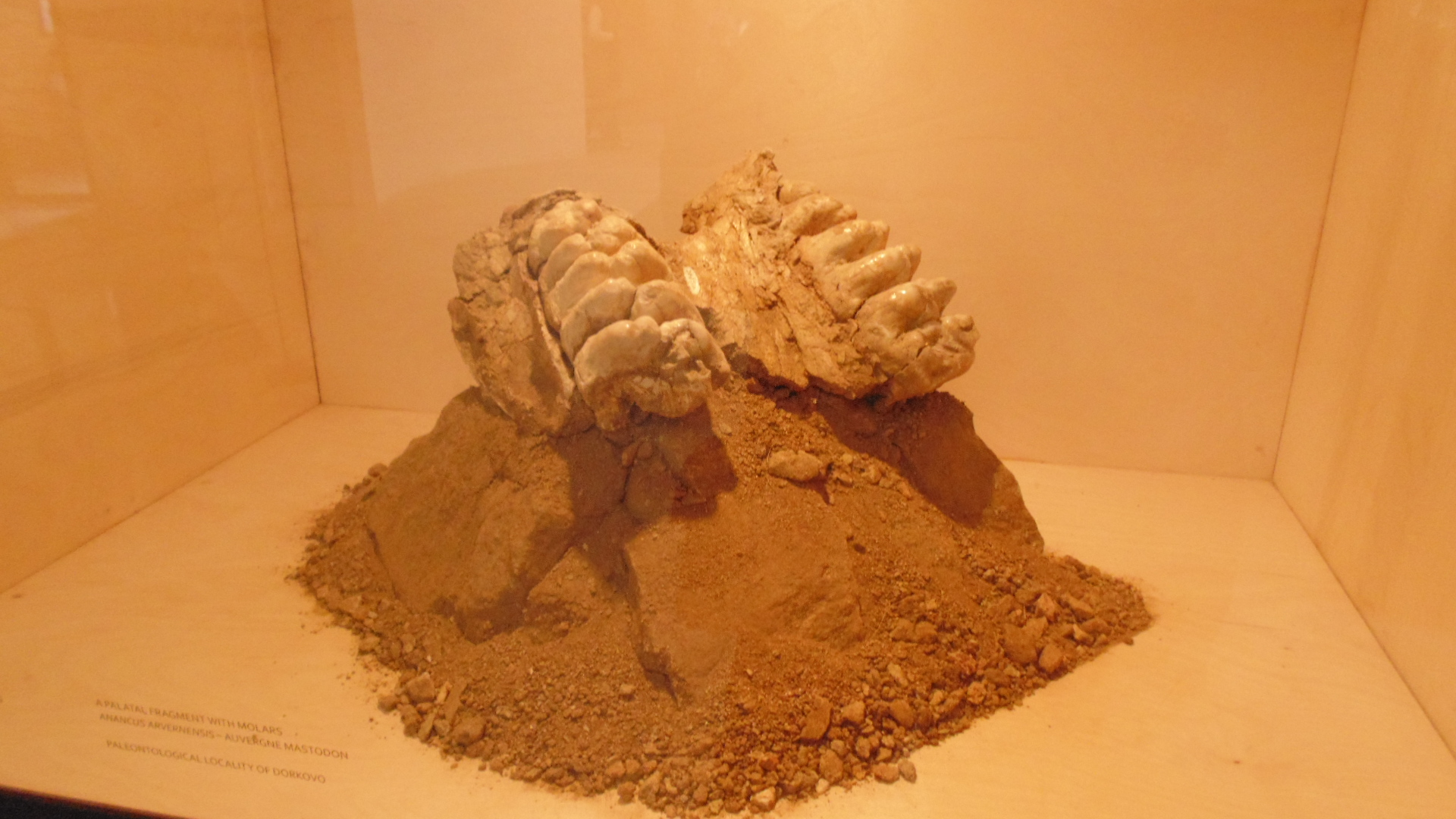
Fossil remains

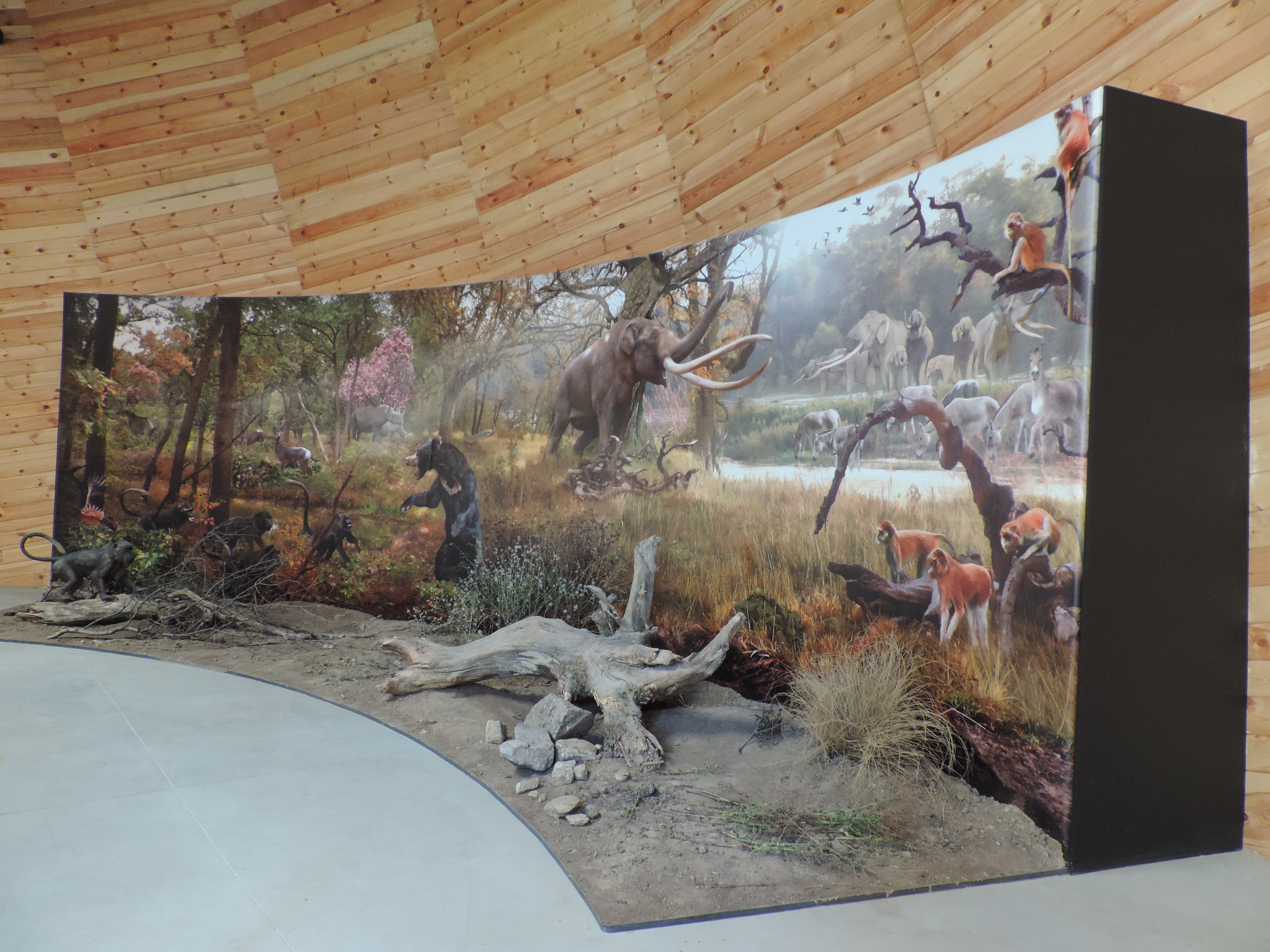
A diorama
