= 1841 in architecture =

The year 1841 in architecture involved some significant events.

== Buildings and structures ==
=== Buildings ===
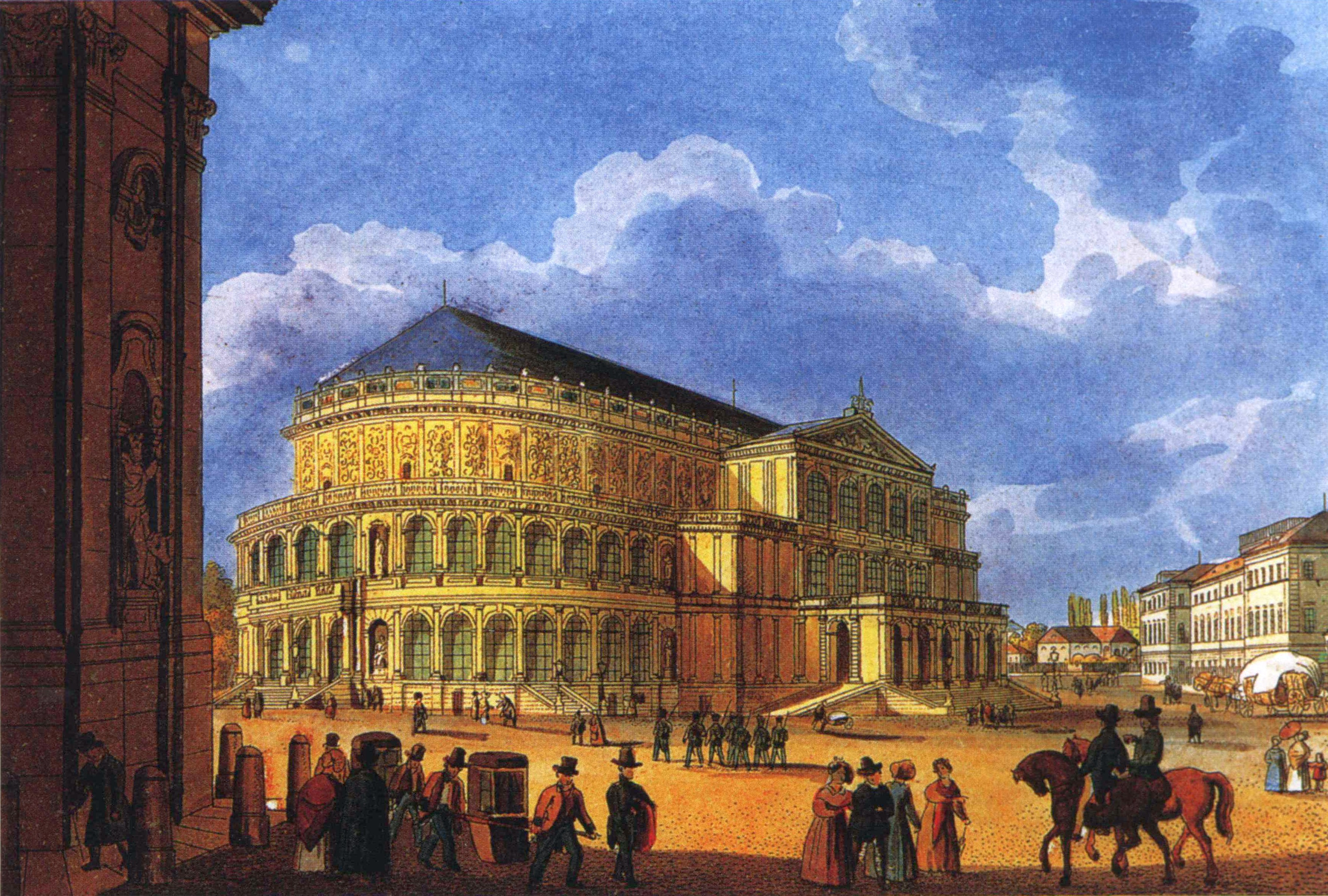
Semperoper, Dresden

- April 13 – Original Semperoper in Dresden, designed by Gottfried Semper, opened.
- September 2 – Leeds Parish Church reconsecrated after reconstruction.
- Pori Old Town Hall in Finland, designed by Carl Ludvig Engel, completed.

== Publications ==
- English architect Augustus Pugin publishes an article on English parish churches in the Dublin Review (London Catholic periodical); two lectures on The True Principles of Pointed or Christian Architecture and a revised edition of his 1836 book Contrasts.

== Awards ==
- Grand Prix de Rome, architecture: Alexis Paccard.

== Births ==
- February 7 – Auguste Choisy, French architect (died 1909)
- July – Richard Carpenter, English architect (died 1893)
- July 10 – John Belcher, English architect (died 1913)
- July 17 – John Oldrid Scott, English architect (died 1913)

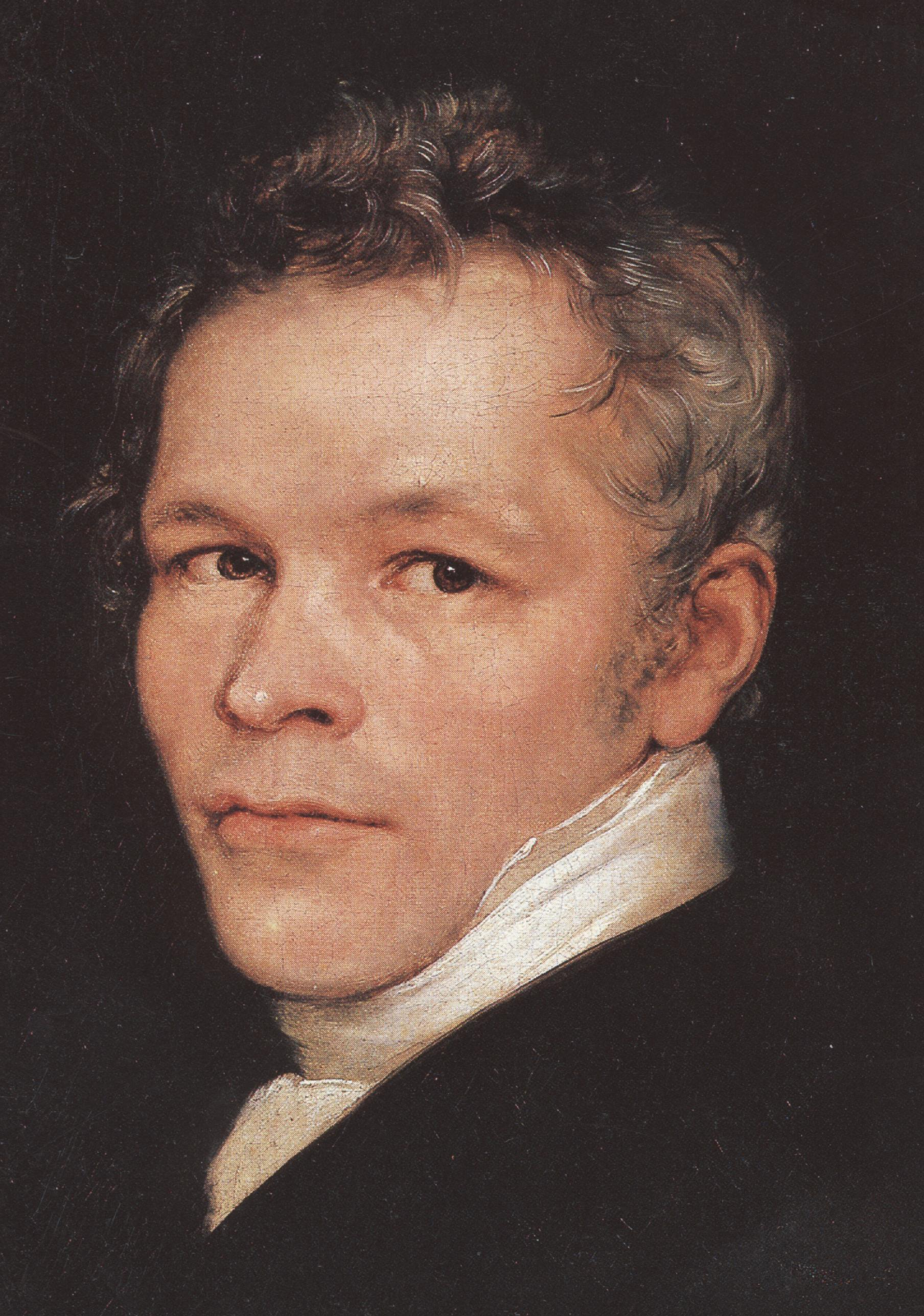
Karl Friedrich Schinkel

- July 13 – Otto Wagner, Austrian architect (died 1918)
- August 12 – Franz Heinrich Schwechten, German architect (died 1924)
- November 19 – Frigyes Schulek, Hungarian architect (died 1919)

== Deaths ==
- October 9 – Karl Friedrich Schinkel, Prussian architect (born 1781)
- December 30 – John Foulston, English architect working in Plymouth (born 1772)
