= Polaria =

Coordinates: 69.6437°N 18.9501°E

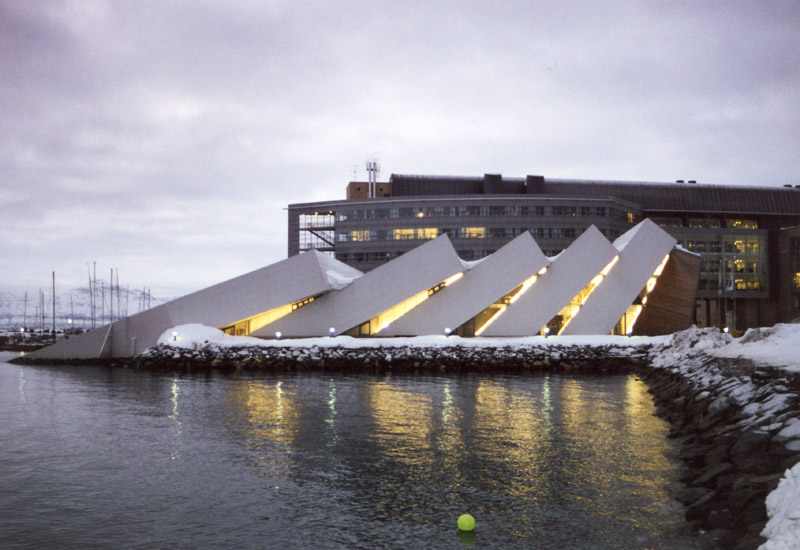
- Polaria seen from the north
- Interactive map of Polaria
- Date opened: May 1998
- Location: Hjalmar Johansens gate 12, 9296, Tromsø, Norway
- Website: www.polaria.no

Polaria is an aquarium situated in Tromsø in Troms, Norway. It is the world's most northerly aquarium. It opened in May 1998. It had 167 000 visitors in 2025.

Most of the displays focus on the northerly islands of Svalbard. There is a five-screen panoramic cinema, an "arctic walkway" area containing displays of polar exploration equipment, stuffed animals and simulated permafrost, many conventional aquaria displaying local marine life as well as open tanks and display tanks containing rock-shore animals, baby fish and other child-friendly exhibits. Its centerpiece is an open pool containing a group of bearded seals, Erignathus barbatus. These are trained and there are regular displays, as much to keep the animals active and healthy as for public entertainment. The seal enclosure has observation blisters set into its sides, so that visitors can look up at the animals from underneath, and a submerged walkway in a transparent tunnel across the bottom, allowing close access to the animals in their natural environment.
