= 1837 in architecture =

The year 1837 in architecture involved some significant events.

== Events ==
- January 11 – The Royal Institute of British Architects in London (RIBA) is granted its royal charter.
- January 20 – Death of English neo-classical architect Sir John Soane gives effect to the creation of his London house as Sir John Soane's Museum.

== Buildings and structures ==
=== Buildings ===
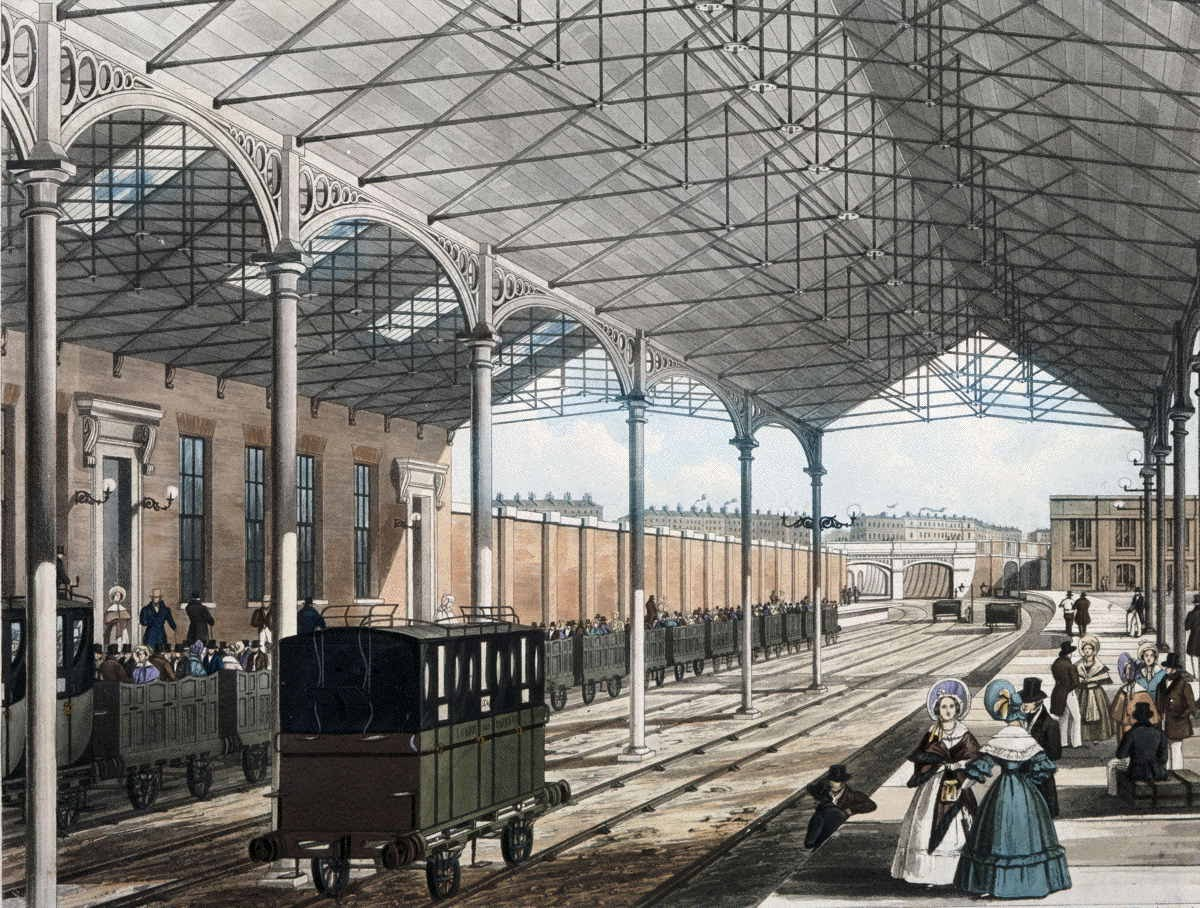
Euston station

- June 10 – Galerie des Batailles at the Palace of Versailles in France, designed by Pierre-François-Léonard Fontaine with Frédéric Nepveu, is opened.
- July 13 – Christ Church, Albany Street, designed by James Pennethorne, is consecrated.
- July 20 – Euston railway station, the first main line station in London, is opened, incorporating the Euston Arch designed by Philip Hardwick (demolished 1961).
- "Great Stove" or Conservatory at Chatsworth House in England, designed by Joseph Paxton, is begun; it is the largest glass building in the world at this time (demolished 1923).
- Major reconstruction of Penrhyn Castle in North Wales by Thomas Hopper is largely completed.
- Rock Park, Rock Ferry, England, laid out by Jonathan Bennison.

== Awards ==
- Grand Prix de Rome, architecture: Jean-Baptiste Guenepin.

== Births ==
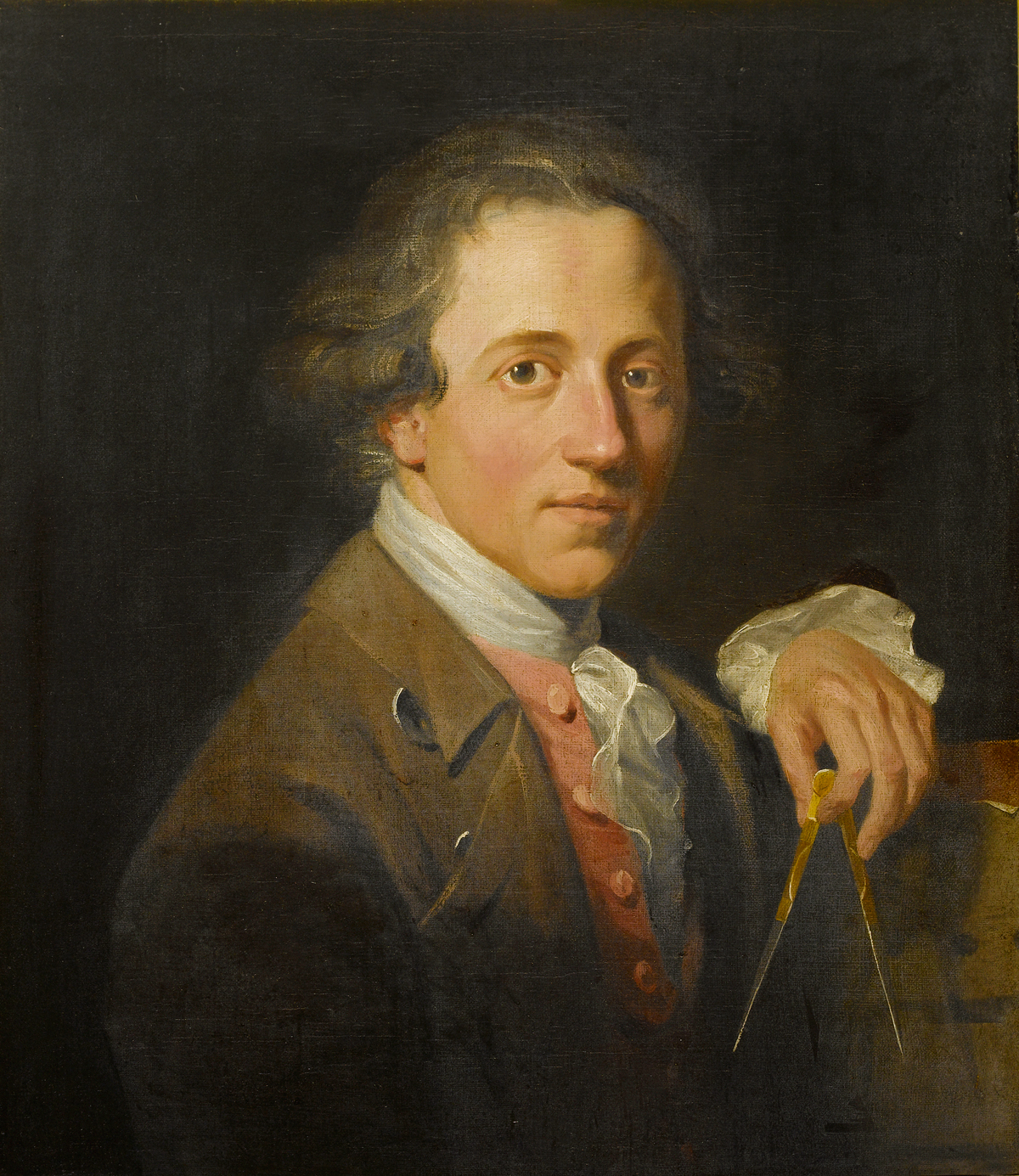
John Soane

- 28 May – George Ashlin, Irish architect (died 1921)
- 4 June – Jean-Louis Pascal, French architect (died 1920)
- 11 December – Webster Paulson, English civil engineer (died 1887)
- 15 December – George B. Post, American architect (died 1913)

== Deaths ==
- January 20 – Sir John Soane, English architect (born 1753)
