= Velizar Simeonovski =

Velizar Simeonovski (Bulgarian: Велизар Симеоновски; born 14 February 1968 in Borovan, Vratsa Province, Bulgaria) is a wildlife artist and zoologist from Bulgaria who is living and working in the United States. His main interest is the paleoart, the scientific illustration and artistic reconstruction of extinct species and the visualization of primeval landscapes. Simeonovski uses computer programs to create his drawings. He is married and has two sons. Since 2003, he works for the Field Museum of Natural History in Chicago, Illinois.

== Career ==
In 2010, Simeonovski was a member of the artistic designer team of the exhibition Mammoths and mastodons: titans of the Ice Age in the Field Museum of Natural History in Chicago, where he created an artistic rendering of Lyuba, the currently most completely preserved woolly mammoth calf. In 2011, he illustrated the work Les petits mammifères de Madagascar: guide de leur distribution, biology et identification by Voahangy Soarimalala and Steven M. Goodman. In 2014, he illustrated the book Extinct Madagascar: Picturing the Island's Past by William L. Jungers and Steven M. Goodman about the fossil and subfossil mammal and bird fauna of Madagascar which was also a subject for an exhibition in the Field Museum of Natural History in Chicago that run from August 2014 to October 2015.

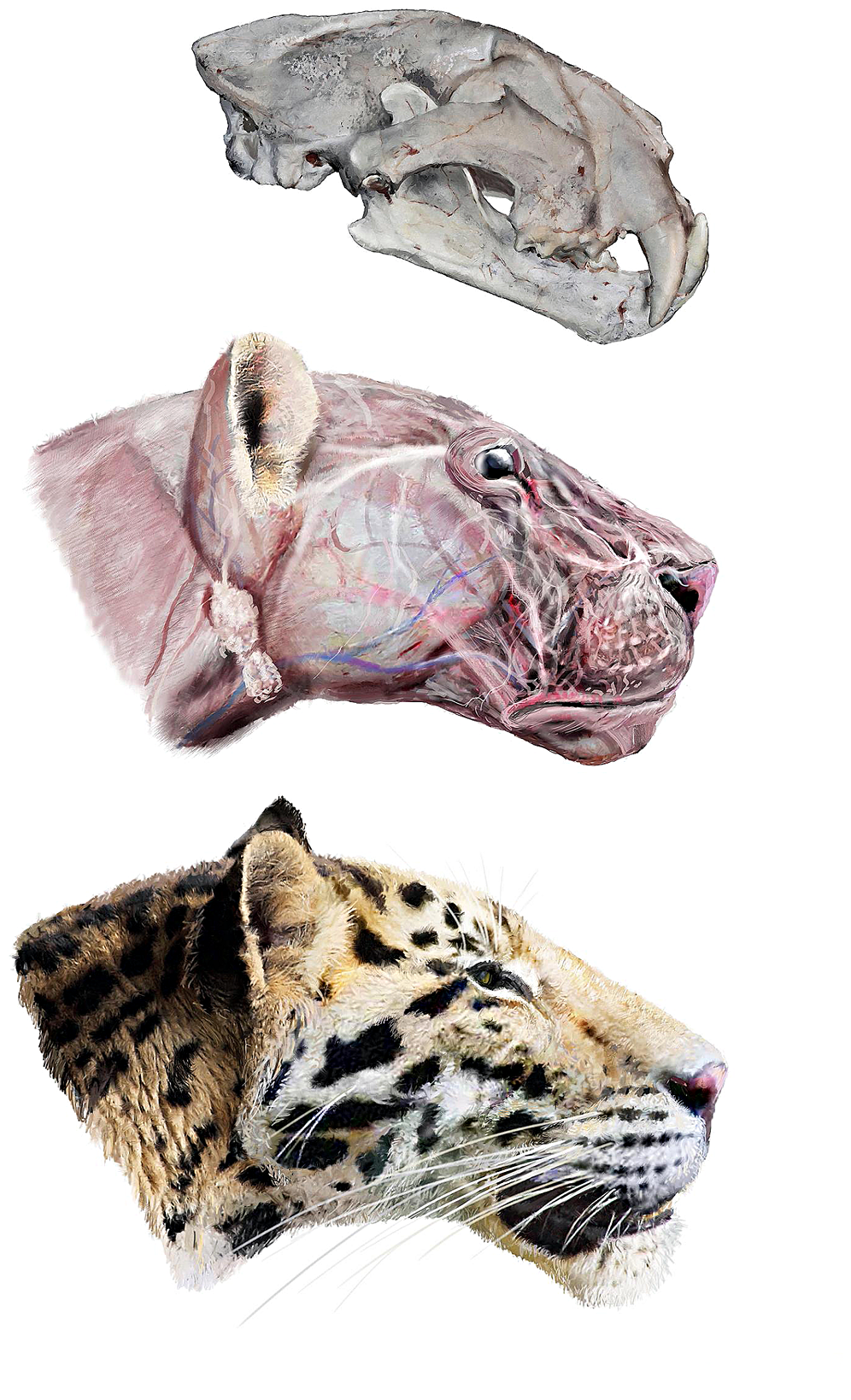
Reconstruction of Panthera zdanskyi, illustrated by Velizar Simeonovski for the journal PLoS ONE in 2011.

Simeonovski also provide illustrations and artistic reconstructions for species description's, including 2011 for Panthera zdanskyi, that same year for the Tsingy wood rail, in 2014 for Yoshi garevskii, and in 2016 for Calciavis grandei. In 2011, Lawrence R. Heaney and his team described seven new species of the mice genus Apomys from Luzon and Mindoro in the Philippines where Simeonovski made the illustrations.
