= 2009 in architecture =

The year 2009 in architecture involved some significant architectural events and new buildings.

== Events ==
- March 3 – Historical Archive of the City of Cologne (1971) collapses.
- April 6 – 2009 L'Aquila earthquake in Italy; dome of Santa Maria di Collemaggio collapses for the second time.
- May 26 – Construction work at Louvre Abu Dhabi officially begins.
- October 21 – Solomon R. Guggenheim Museum in New York City celebrates its 50th anniversary (after a three-year restoration effort).
- November – The second World Architecture Festival is held in Barcelona.
- Burj Khalifa is set to open several different times in 2009, and ultimately postponed until 2010.
- The Russia Tower gets cancelled for unknown reasons.
- PLP Architecture founded in London.

== Buildings and structures ==
=== Buildings opened ===
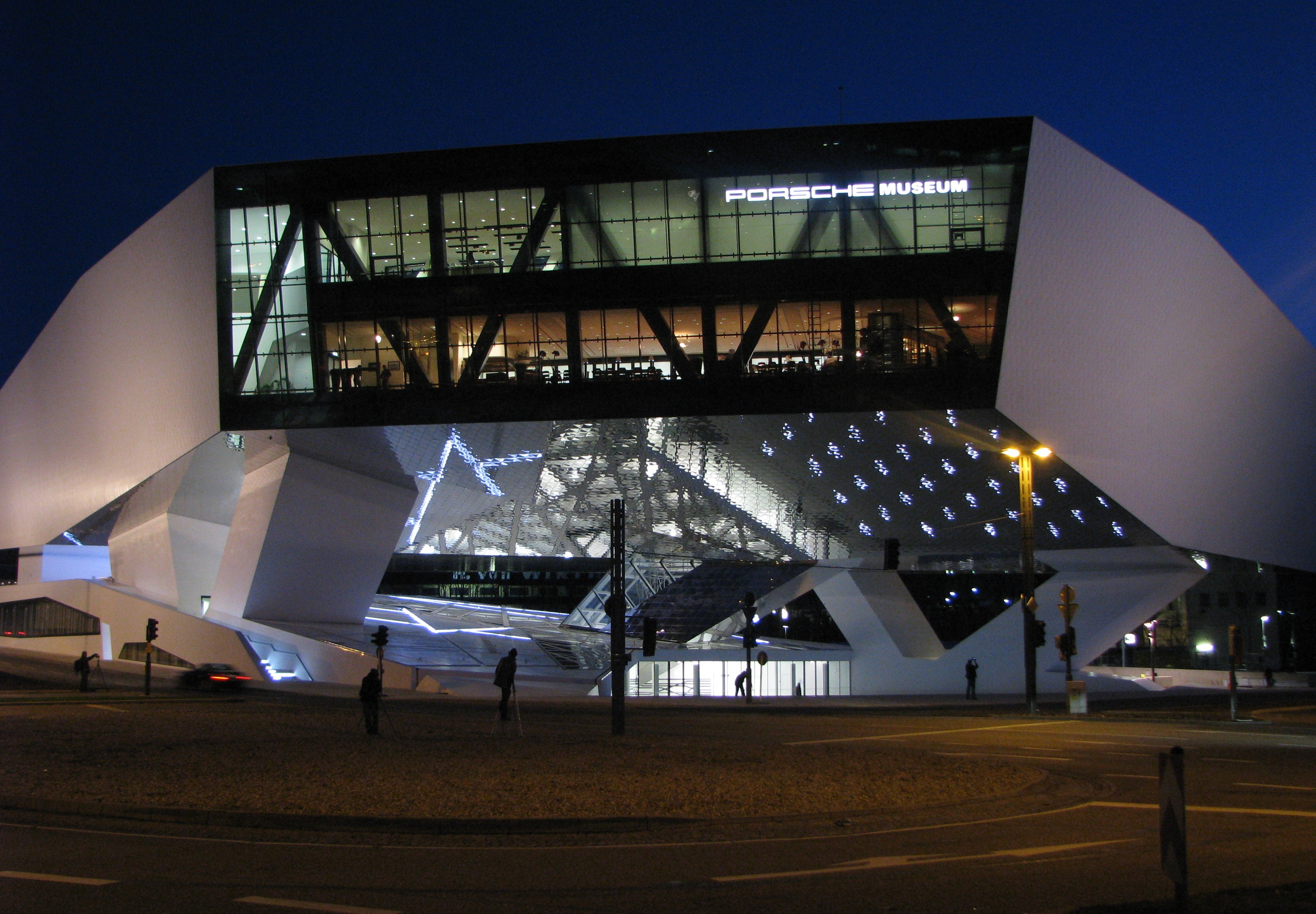
Porsche Museum, Stuttgart, Germany

.

- January – Embassy of the United States, Baghdad, the largest and most expensive embassy in the world, opens.
- January 17 – Copenhagen Concert Hall, designed by Jean Nouvel, opens.

opens.

- January 22 – Wales Millennium Centre, Cardiff, Wales, opens to the public.
- January 31 – Porsche Museum, Stuttgart, designed by Delugan Meissl Associated Architects, opens.
- February 15 – Princess Elisabeth Antarctica, inaugurated.
- February 22 – Alice Tully Hall at Lincoln Center in New York City reopens after major renovations by Diller Scofidio + Renfro.
- March 7 – Our Lady of the Most Holy Trinity Chapel at Thomas Aquinas College, Santa Paula, California, designed by Duncan G. Stroik, is dedicated.
- March 14 – New Cardiff Central Library in St. David's, Cardiff, Wales, designed by Building Design Partnership, opens to the public.
- April 2 – New Yankee Stadium, home of the New York Yankees baseball team in the Bronx, designed by Populous (formerly HOK Sport), opens.
- April 13 – Citi Field, new home of the New York Mets baseball team in Queens, opens.
- April 25 – Prada Transformer building in Seoul, South Korea, designed by Rem Koolhaas, opens.
- April 30 – 300 New Jersey Avenue office building on the mall in Washington, D.C., designed by British architects Rogers Stirk Harbour + Partners, opens.

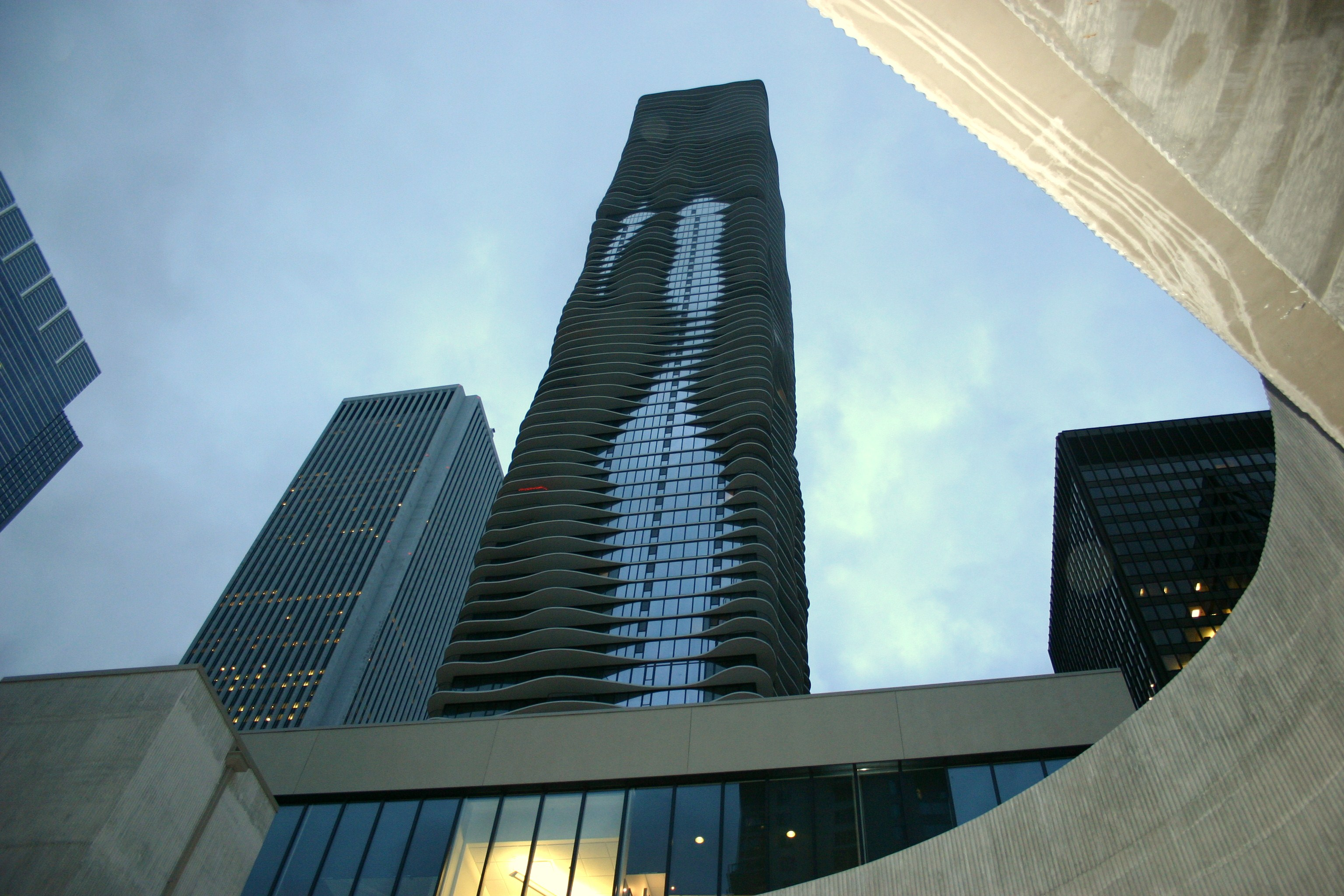
Aqua in downtown Chicago, USA

- May 21 – Museum Brandhorst in Munich, designed by Sauerbruch Hutton, opens.
- June 8 – First segment of the High Line Park in Chelsea, Manhattan opens.
- June 12 – Hafod Eryri at the summit of Snowdon in Wales, designed by Ray Hole Architects, is opened.
- June 21 – New Acropolis Museum in Athens, designed by Bernard Tschumi with Michael Photiadis, opens to the public.
- July – New Sarawak State Legislative Assembly Building in Kuching, Malaysia, officially opened.
- August 4 – The Knut Hamsun Centre in Hamarøy Municipality, Norway, designed by Steven Holl, opens.
- August 15 – 41 Cooper Square, the new Cooper Union academic building in New York City, designed by Thom Mayne, has its opening ceremony.
- September 9 – Herning Museum of Contemporary Art, Denmark, new building designed by American architect Steven Holl, opens.

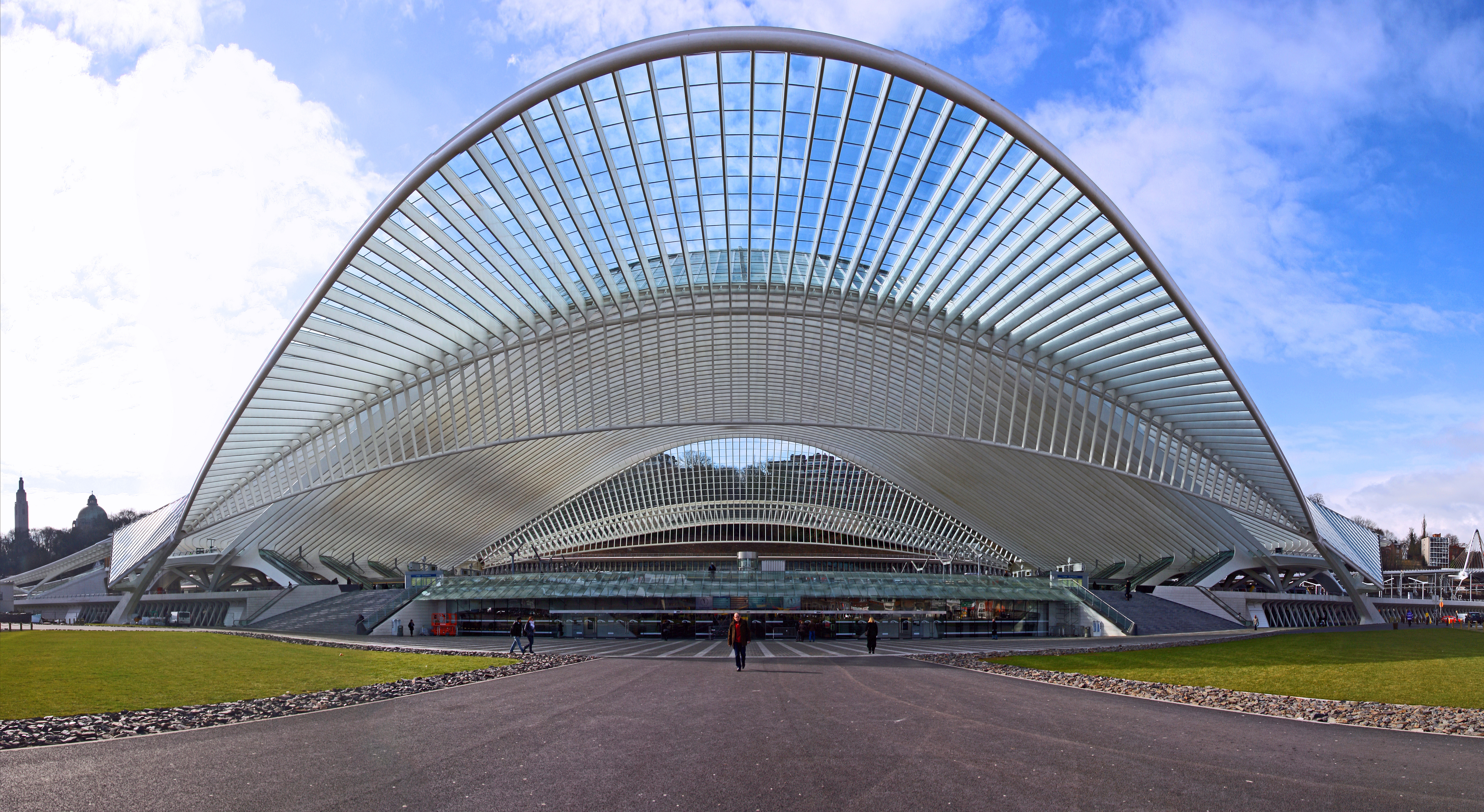
Liège-Guillemins railway station in Liège, Belgium

- September 18 – Liège-Guillemins railway station in Belgium, designed by Santiago Calatrava, has its opening ceremony.
- September 29 – Manitoba Hydro Place in downtown Winnipeg, designed by Kuwabara Payne McKenna Blumberg Architects of Toronto, opens.
- October 16 – Extensive interior reconstruction of the Neues Museum, Berlin, to the designs of David Chipperfield, is officially opened.
- November 7 – Extensive three-year internal rebuild and expansion of the Ashmolean Museum, Oxford, to the designs of Rick Mather, is completed.
- November 14 – Centre for Contemporary Art Nottingham (gallery) in Nottingham, England, designed by Caruso St John, opens.
- December – Jamieson Place (Calgary) in Calgary, Alberta
- December 5 – Mandarin Oriental, Las Vegas, part of the CityCenter complex in Paradise, Nevada, opens.
- December 16 – The CityCenter urban complex in Paradise, Nevada, designed by Ehrenkrantz, Eckstut & Kuhn Architects, opens.
- date unknown – Jacob und Wilhelm Grimm-Zentrum library at Humboldt University of Berlin, designed by Max Dudler.

=== Buildings completed ===
- May 21 – Stanbrook Abbey, Wass, North Yorkshire, England, first stage, designed by Feilden Clegg Bradley Studios.
- May 27 – Cowboys Stadium, new home of the Dallas Cowboys football team, designed by HKS.
- October 21 – Soccer City (FNB Stadium) in Johannesburg, South Africa, host to the 2010 FIFA World Cup.
- November – MAXXI - National Museum of the 21st Century Arts in Rome, Italy, designed by Zaha Hadid.
- November 1 – Yas Hotel Abu Dhabi in the Yas Marina Circuit, Abu Dhabi, designed by Asymptote Architecture of New York.
- December 27 – Darunaman Mosque in northern Thailand.
- date unknown
  - The Cathedral of the Annunciation in Voronezh, Russia.
  - Legacy Tower, Chicago, designed by Solomon, Cordwell, Buenz.
  - The Tower, Meridian Quay, Swansea, Wales, designed by Latitude Architects.
  - Punta della Dogana art museum in Venice, restored by Tadao Ando.
  - Woodward's Building in Vancouver, Canada.
  - Bateman's Row (home and studio) in Shoreditch, London, designed for themselves by Theis + Khan Architects.
  - Buildings in Spain designed by Alberto Campo Baeza
    - "Between Cathedrals", Cádiz.
    - MA Museum, Granada.
    - Rufo House, Toledo.

== Awards ==
- AIA Gold Medal – Glenn Murcutt (Australia)
- Alvar Aalto Medal – Tegnestuen Vandkunsten
- Architecture Firm Award – Olson Kundig Architects
- Driehaus Architecture Prize – Abdel-Wahed El-Wakil
- Grand Prix de l'urbanisme – François Ascher
- Emporis Skyscraper Award – Aqua
- European Union Prize for Contemporary Architecture (Mies van der Rohe Prize) – Snøhetta
- Lawrence Israel Prize - Gaetano Pesce
- Praemium Imperiale Architecture Award – Zaha Hadid
- Pritzker Prize – Peter Zumthor
- RAIA Gold Medal – Ken Maher
- RIBA Royal Gold Medal – Álvaro Siza Vieira
- Stirling Prize – Rogers Stirk Harbour + Partners for Maggie's Centre, London
- Thomas Jefferson Medal in Architecture – Robert Irwin.
- Twenty-five Year Award – Faneuil Hall Marketplace
- Vincent Scully Prize – Christopher Alexander

== Deaths ==
- January 14 – Jan Kaplický, Czech architect (born 1937)
- February 3 – Earl Flansburgh, Boston architect (born 1931)
- February 23 – Sverre Fehn, Norwegian architect (born 1924)
- March 11 – María Luisa Dehesa Gómez Farías, Mexican architect (born 1912)
- July 9 – H. T. Cadbury-Brown, English architect (born 1913)
- July 15 – Julius Shulman, California architectural photographer (born 1910)
- August 3 – Charles Gwathmey, American architect (born 1938)
- August 16 – Mualla Eyüboğlu, one of the first female Turkish architects (born 1919)
- November 27 – Maxwell M. Kalman, Québécois architect (born 1906)
- December 8 – Claude Vasconi, French architect (born 1940)

== See also ==
- Timeline of architecture
