= Light House (London) =

House in West London

General information
- Location: 1 St Stephen's Gardens, London, W11 2AW, United Kingdom
- Coordinates: 51.515029°N 0.198774°W
- Completed: 2005
- Cost: Confidential
- Client: Private

Design and construction
- Architect: Gianni Botsford Architects
- Awards: Winner, RIBA Regional Award, 2006 Shortlist, Manser Medal, 2006 Finalist, Grand Designs Best New Build House, 2007 Winner, AIA UK Excellence in Design Award, 2007

The Light House is a private house in London that won a 2006 RIBA Award and was also short-listed for the 2006 Manser Medal for Architecture. It was designed by the firm of architects Gianni Botsford with environmental and structural engineering by Arup Group.

The project inserted a new house, accessed through an archway into the end of a Victorian mews. It was completed in 2005.

The house has been called "one of the finest new city homes to be found anywhere in the world" and has been the location for celebrity and fashion shoots.

== Site and brief ==
The site was a backland development surrounded by buildings on all sides. After studying the fall of light throughout the year on the site, the decision was made to build a courtyard-style house where wide open spaces and courtyards make the most of natural light while maximising privacy.
