= Erik Asmussen =

Danish architect (1913–1998)

Erik "Abbi" Asmussen (2 November 1913 – 29 August 1998) was a Danish architect active in Järna, Sweden.

Asmussen was born in Copenhagen, Denmark, and died, aged 84, in Järna, Sweden.

== Buildings by Asmussen ==
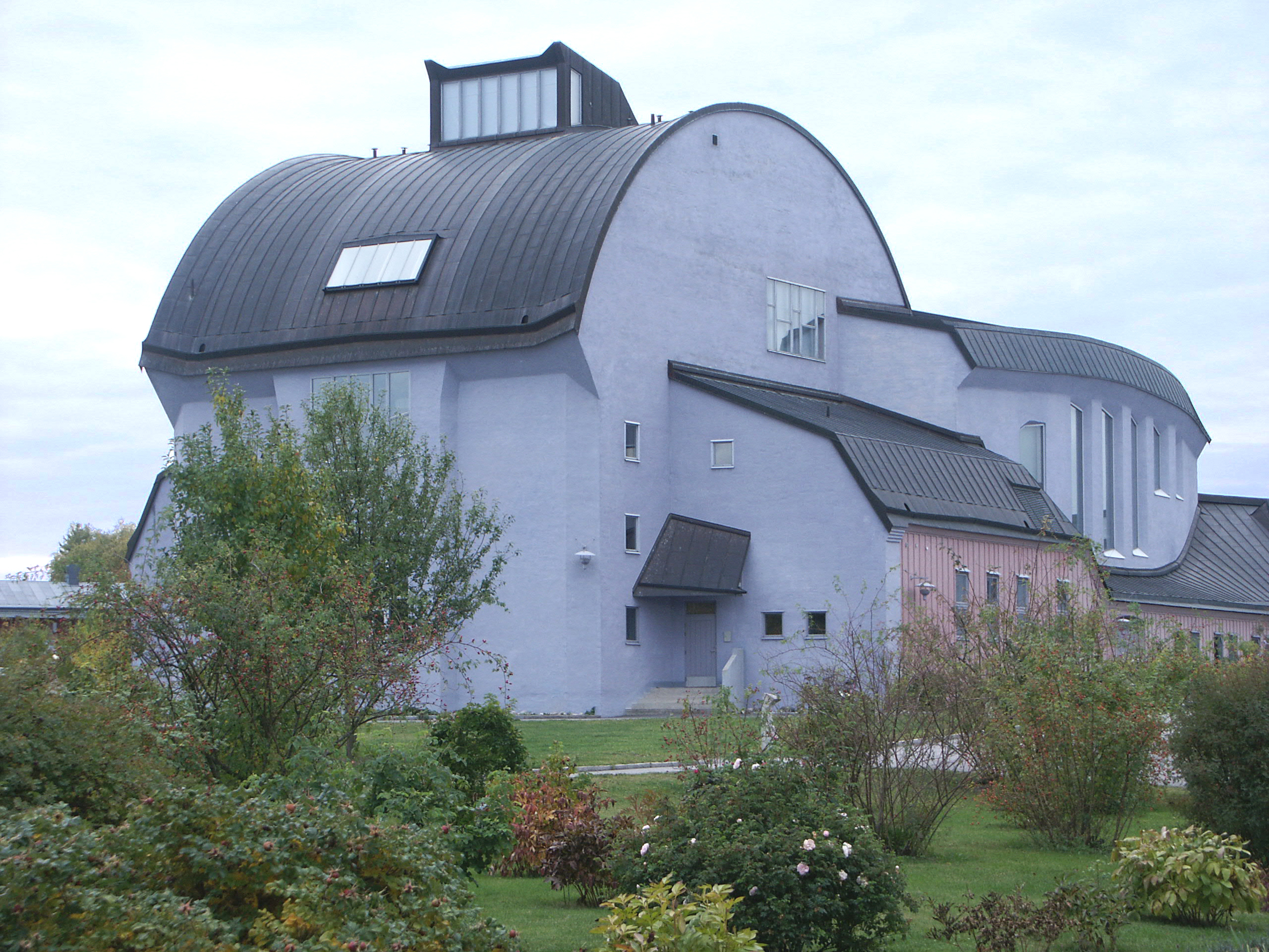
Erik Asmussen's Cultural Centre in Ytterjärna.

- Kulturhuset i Ytterjärna
- Vidar hospital Ytterjärna
- Kristofferskolan i Bromma, Stockholm
- Örjanskolan i Järna
- Rudolf Steiner Seminariet i Järna
