= 1918 in architecture =

The year 1918 in architecture involved some significant architectural events and new buildings.

== Events ==
- November 3 – A Baroque Marian column (built 1650) in Prague, the Czech Republic, is destroyed by nationalists.
- December 3 – The November Group (Novembergruppe) of expressionist artists and architects is formed in Germany, and shortly afterwards merges with the Arbeitsrat für Kunst.

== Buildings and structures ==
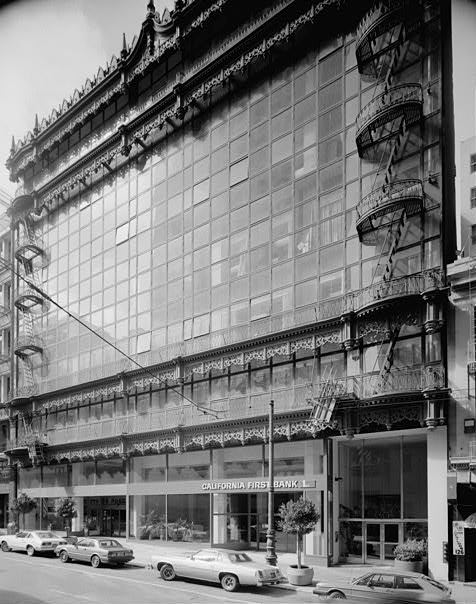
Hallidie Building

=== Buildings ===
- Hallidie Building is built in San Francisco. Designed by Willis Polk. Credited as the first glass curtain wall building.
- D. L. James House is built in Carmel Highlands, California. Designed by Greene and Greene in an Arts and Crafts style.
- Copenhagen Police Headquarters are begun in Denmark. Designed by Hack Kampmann in a Neoclassical style.
- Our Lady of the Victories Basilica in Melbourne, Australia is completed.
- Newman College in Melbourne, Australia designed by Walter Burley Griffin, is completed.
- The Chapel of St. James, of the Archbishop Quigley Preparatory Seminary in Chicago, designed by Zachary Taylor Davis, in the French Gothic style, is completed.
- Woodland Chapel in Skogskyrkogården Cemetery is built in Stockholm, Sweden. Designed by Erik Gunnar Asplund.
- Snellman House in Djursholm, Sweden, is built. Designed by Erik Gunnar Asplund.

== Awards ==
- RIBA Royal Gold Medal – Ernest Newton.
- Grand Prix de Rome, architecture: not held.

== Births ==
- February 1 – Minnette de Silva, Ceylonese modernist architect (died 1998)
- March 16 – Aldo van Eyck, Dutch architect (died 1999)
- April 10 – Jørn Utzon, Danish architect best known for Sydney Opera House (died 2008)
- July 3 – Benjamin C. Thompson, American architect (died 2002)
- October 23 – Paul Rudolph, American architect and academic (died 1997)
- December 16 – Gerard Goalen, English Catholic church architect (died 1999)

== Deaths ==
- April 11 – Otto Wagner, Austrian architect and urban planner (born 1841)
- May 25 – William Pitt, Australian architect, public servant and politician (born 1855)
- October 25 – Zsigmond Quittner, Hungarian commercial architect (died 1859)
