= 2006 in architecture =

List of years in architecture	(table)
- … 1996; 1997; 1998; 1999; 2000; 2001; 2002; 2003; 2004; 2005; 2006; 2007; 2008; 2009; 2010; 2011; 2012; 2013; 2014; 2015; 2016 …
- Buildings and structures: Art; Archaeology; Architecture; Literature; Music; Philosophy; Science; +...

The year 2006 in architecture involved some significant architectural events and new buildings.

== Events ==
- January 9 – Fire destroys Chicago's 1891 Pilgrim Baptist Church, designed by Louis Sullivan.
- January 31 – Ground breaks on Waterview Tower, and the 89-story Shangri-La Hotel in Chicago.
- March 15 – Cirrus apartment building topped off in Helsinki, becoming the tallest building in Finland (until 2014).
- April 10 – Groundbreaking ceremony for the High Line elevated greenway in New York City.
- April 27 – Construction work begins on the Freedom Tower, a replacement for the World Trade Center.
- July 8 – The government of Abu Dhabi and Solomon R. Guggenheim Foundation signs a memorandum of understanding for the building of the Guggenheim Abu Dhabi.
- September 21 – Construction work begins on the Skolkovo Moscow School of Management campus, designed by David Adjaye.

== Buildings and structures ==
=== Buildings ===
- February 5 – Madrid-Barajas Airport Terminal 4 inaugurated, designed by Antonio Lamela and Richard Rogers.
- March 1 – The Senedd, the National Assembly building in Cardiff, Wales, by architect Richard Rogers, is opened by Queen Elizabeth II of the United Kingdom.

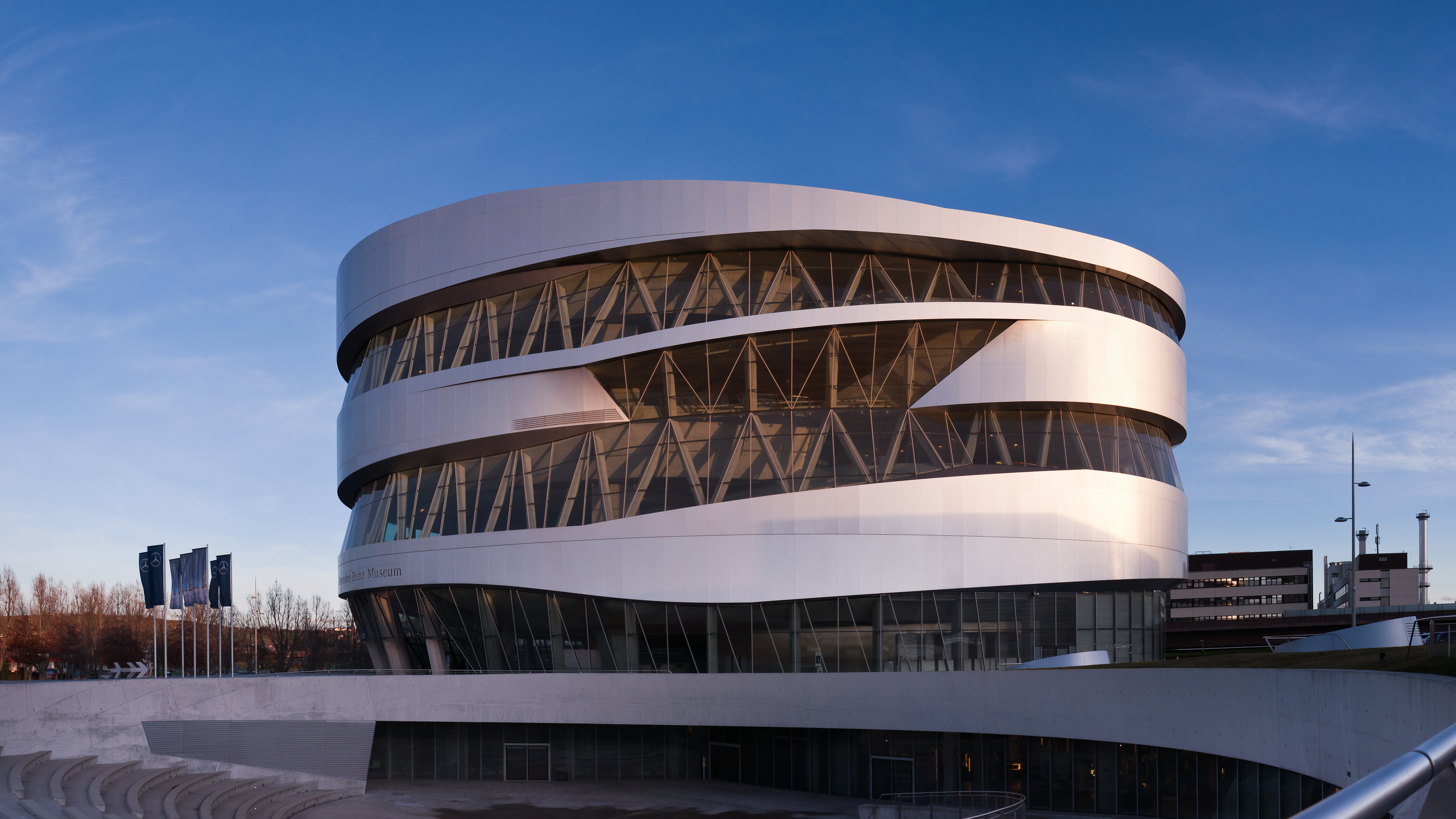
The Mercedes-Benz Museum in Stuttgart, Germany

- April 4 – Busch Stadium, designed by Populous (formerly HOK sport), opened as the new home of the St. Louis Cardinals.
- May 4 – Hearst Tower employees move into the Norman Foster designed, diagrid building near Columbus Circle, in New York City.
- May 5 – Aurora Tower opened to the public as the tallest building in Brisbane, Australia (until 2012).
- May 19 – Mercedes-Benz Museum, Stuttgart, Germany, designed by UNStudio, opened.
- May 23 – 7 World Trade Center officially opens the new building designed by Skidmore, Owings & Merrill at noon, with a free concert.
- May 26 – Berlin Hauptbahnhof (Berlin Main Station) opening ceremony. Design from the winning competition entry by the Hamburg architecture firm Gerkan, Marg and Partners.
- June 14 – Four Seasons Centre for the Performing Arts grand opening in Toronto, Ontario, Canada, by Canadian Diamond and Schmitt Architects.
- June 16 – The National Library of Belarus opened in Minsk, Belarus in the shape of a rhombicuboctahedron.
- June 20 – Musée du quai Branly – Jacques Chirac in Paris, designed by Jean Nouvel, inaugurated.
- June 26 – Savill Building opens at the Savill Garden in Windsor Great Park, Surrey, with a gridshell roof designed by Glen Howells Architects.
- July – Red Ribbon (bench), designed by Turenscape as part of Tanghe River Park, Qinhuangdao, China, opens.
- July 1 – Robert and Arlene Kogod Courtyard, designed by Foster and Partners opens as part of The Donald W. Reynolds Center for American Art and Portraiture refurbishment in Washington, D.C.
- July 22 – Emirates Stadium, designed by Populous, opened in the London Borough of Islington for the Arsenal Football Club.
- Summer – House of Sweden (the Swedish embassy) completed in Washington, D.C., designed by Swedish architects Gert Wingårdh and Tomas Hansen.
- September – Museum of Modern Literature (Literaturmuseum der Moderne or LiMo) opened in Marbach, Germany, by British architect David Chipperfield.
- September 2 – Bishan Community Library opened in Singapore.
- October – Janelia Farm Research Campus completed in Loudoun County, Virginia, by Rafael Viñoly.
- October 5 – The Arsht Center opens in Downtown Miami, Florida as the third largest performing arts center in the United States.
- October 11 – Eureka Tower a 297.3 metres (975 ft) residential skyscraper, designed by Fender Katsalidis Architects, opens in Melbourne, Australia.

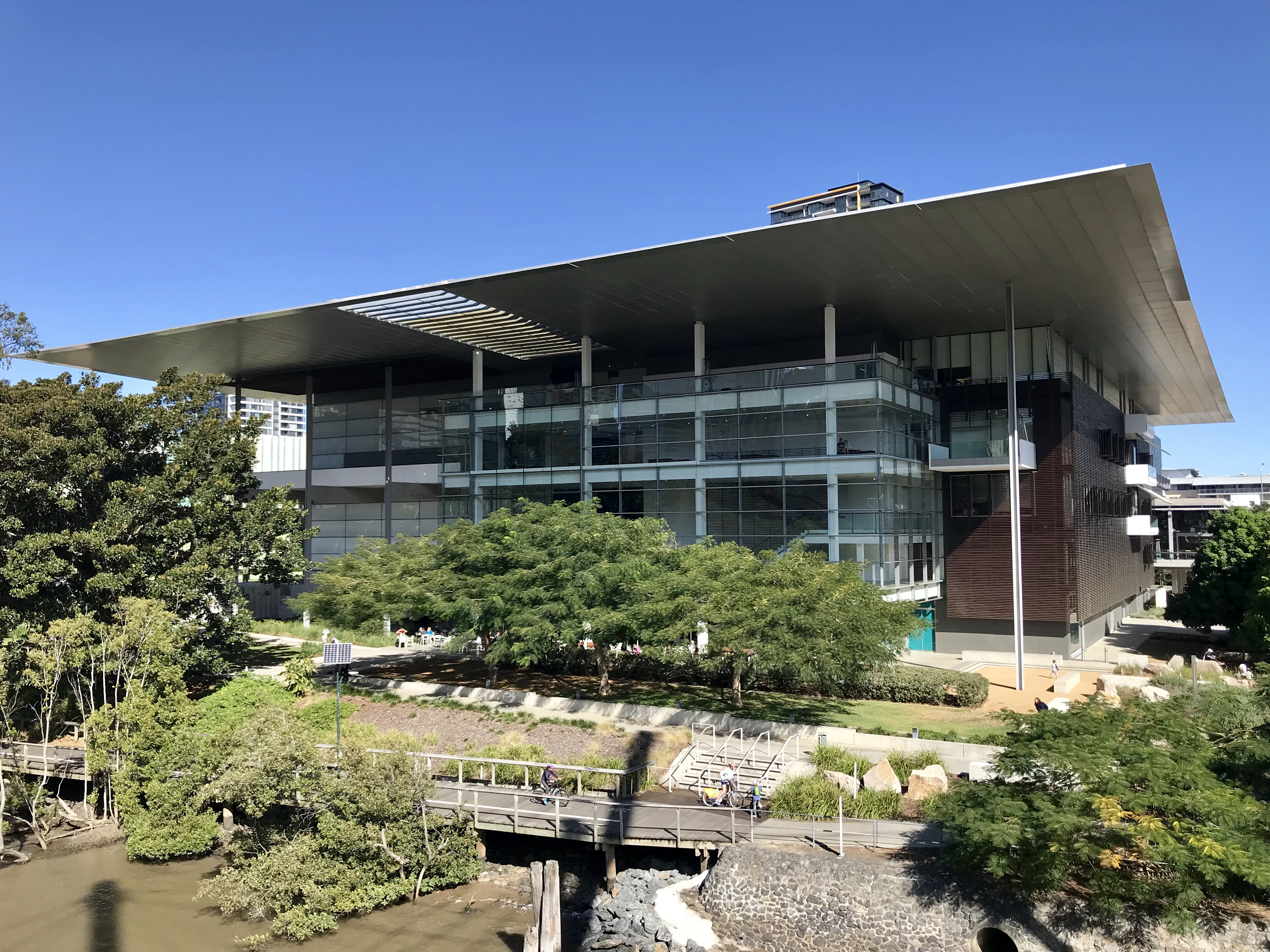
Queensland Gallery of Modern Art in Brisbane, Australia

- October 26 – Klaus Advanced Computing Building officially opened on the campus of Georgia Institute of Technology, by American architects Perkins+Will.
- October 27 – Vesteda Tower a 90 m (300 ft) residential tower, designed by Jo Coenen, opens in Eindhoven, Netherlands.
- November – Maggie's Centre, Kirkcaldy, Scotland, a drop-in cancer care centre; Zaha Hadid's first built work in the United Kingdom.
- December 1
  - Queensland Gallery of Modern Art, designed by Architectus, opens in Brisbane, Queensland, Australia.
  - Wayne L. Morse United States Courthouse officially opened in Eugene, Oregon, designed by Morphosis.
- date unknown – America's Cup Building inaugurated in Valencia, Spain, designed by British architect David Chipperfield.

== Buildings completed ==
- January 16 – 10 Holloway Circus is completed in Birmingham, UK, designed by SimpsonHaugh and Partners.
- October 9 – Beetham Tower in Manchester, UK, designed by architect Ian Simpson, who himself resides in the top penthouse.
- December 10 – Institute of Contemporary Art, Boston completed, designed by Diller Scofidio + Renfro.
- December – Megasport Arena in Moscow, Russia.

Saint-Pierre, Firminy

- date unknown
  - Accordia housing development in Cambridge, UK, phase 1 construction, designed by Feilden Clegg Bradley Studios with Maccreanor Lavington and Alison Brooks Architects (Stirling Prize 2008).
  - Saint-Pierre, Firminy, France, completed by José Oubrerie to a church design by Le Corbusier (died 1965) begun in 1971.
  - CNOOC Building in Beijing, designed by American architects Kohn Pedersen Fox.
  - KUMU (KUnstiMUuseum), Tallinn, Estonia, designed by Finnish architect Pekka Vapaavuori.
  - Halmstad Library, Halmstad, Sweden, designed by Schmidt Hammer Lassen Architects.
  - The New York Times Building in New York City, designed by Renzo Piano and Fox & Fowle.

== Awards ==
- AIA Gold Medal – Antoine Predock
- Architecture Firm Award – Moore Ruble Yudell
- Carbuncle Cup – Drake Circus Shopping Centre
- Driehaus Architecture Prize – Allan Greenberg
- Emporis Skyscraper Award – Hearst Tower
- Grand Prix de l'urbanisme – Francis Cuillier
- Praemium Imperiale Architecture Award – Frei Otto
- Pritzker Prize – Paulo Mendes da Rocha (1928–2021) from São Paulo, Brasil
- Prix de l'Équerre d'Argent – Orléans-la-Source Science Library by Florence Lipsky and Pascal Rollet
- RAIA Gold Medal – Kerry Hill
- RIAS Award in Architecture – Page\Park Architects for Maggie's Centre, Inverness
- RIBA Royal Gold Medal – Toyo Ito
- Stirling Prize – Richard Rogers Partnership for Barajas Airport Terminal 4, Madrid, Spain
- Thomas Jefferson Medal in Architecture – Peter Zumthor
- AIA Twenty-five Year Award – Thorncrown Chapel by E. Fay Jones
- Vincent Scully Prize – Phyllis Lambert

== Births ==
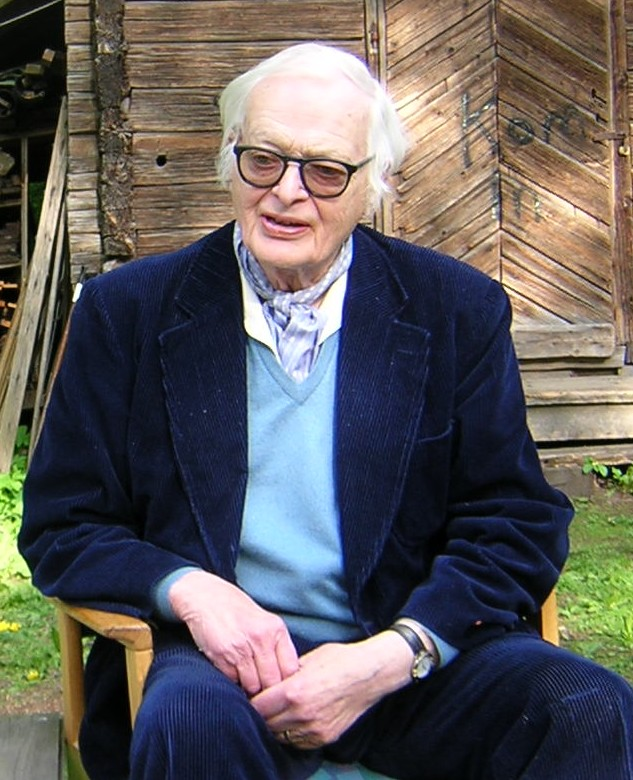
Nisse Strinning

== Deaths ==
- March 9 – Harry Seidler, Austrian-born Australian architect (born 1923)
- April 25 – Jane Jacobs, American-Canadian journalist, author, and activist best known for her influence on urban studies (born 1916)
- May 10 – Nisse Strinning, Swedish architect and designer (born 1917)
- July 5 – Hugh Stubbins, US architect (born 1912)

== See also ==
- Timeline of architecture
