= 1917 in architecture =

List of years in architecture	(table)
- … 1907; 1908; 1909; 1910; 1911; 1912; 1913; 1914; 1915; 1916; 1917; 1918; 1919; 1920; 1921; 1922; 1923; 1924; 1925; 1926; 1927 …
- Buildings and structures: Art; Archaeology; Architecture; Literature; Music; Philosophy; Science; +...

The year 1917 in architecture involved some significant architectural events and new buildings.

== Events ==
- The journal De Stijl is first published by Theo van Doesburg.

== Buildings and structures ==
=== Buildings ===
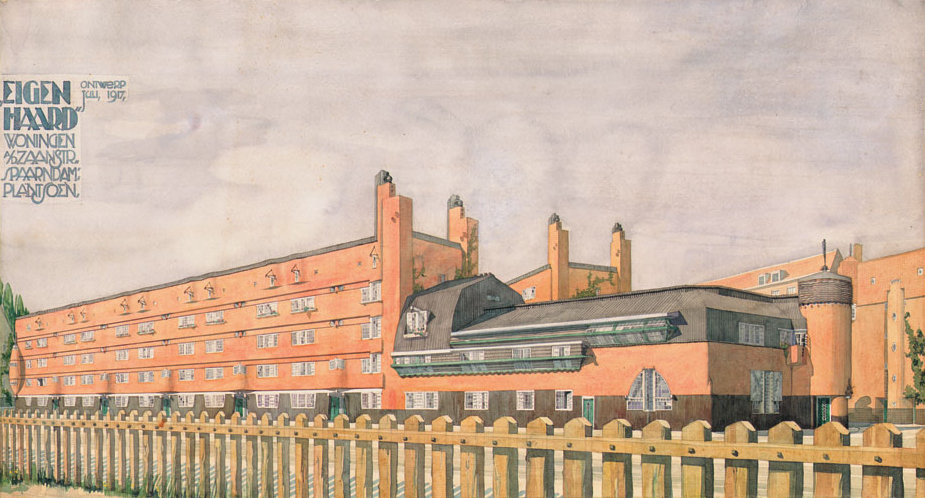
Het Schip design

- The Het Schip housing scheme designed by Michel de Klerk in Amsterdam is started.
- The Lister County Courthouse (Listers härads tingshus) designed by Erik Gunnar Asplund in a Mannerist style in Sölvesborg, Sweden is started.

=== Buildings completed ===
- Cunard Building, Liverpool, England, designed by William Edward Willink and Philip Coldwell Thicknesse.
- Edificio Correos, San José, Costa Rica
- Livermore House, San Francisco, California, USA, designed by Julia Morgan.
- Rhode Island Hospital Trust Building, Providence, Rhode Island, USA, designed by York and Sawyer

== Awards ==
- RIBA Royal Gold Medal – Henri Paul Nenot.

== Births ==
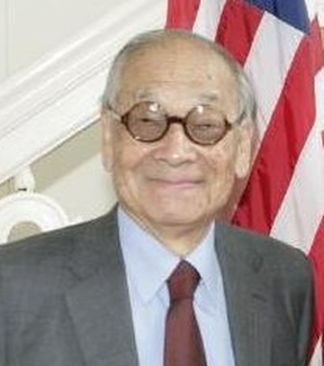
I. M. Pei

- March 2 – Laurie Baker, British-born Indian architect, known for his initiatives in cost-effective energy-efficient architecture (died 2007)
- April 26 – I. M. Pei, Chinese American architect often called a master of modern architecture (died 2019)
- July 6 – Wang Da-hong, Chinese-born Taiwanese architect (died 2018)
- September 14 – Ettore Sottsass, Italian architect and designer (died 2007)
- December 8 – Nisse Strinning, Swedish architect and designer (died 2006)
- December 10 – Eladio Dieste, Uruguayan engineer and architect (died 2000)

== Deaths ==
- January 19 – E. R. Robson, English school architect (born 1836)
- February 8 – Thomas Arboe, Danish railway station architect (born 1837)
- July 2 – Gerald Horsley, English architect (born 1862)
- August 4 – C. W. Stephens, English commercial architect (born c.1845)
- September 23 – Robert Swain Peabody, Boston architect (born 1845)
- November 23 – William Ralph Emerson, American architect (born 1833)
- December 30 – Gustaf Nyström, Finnish architect (born 1856)
