= 1836 in architecture =

The year 1836 in architecture involved some significant events.

== Buildings and structures ==
=== Buildings ===
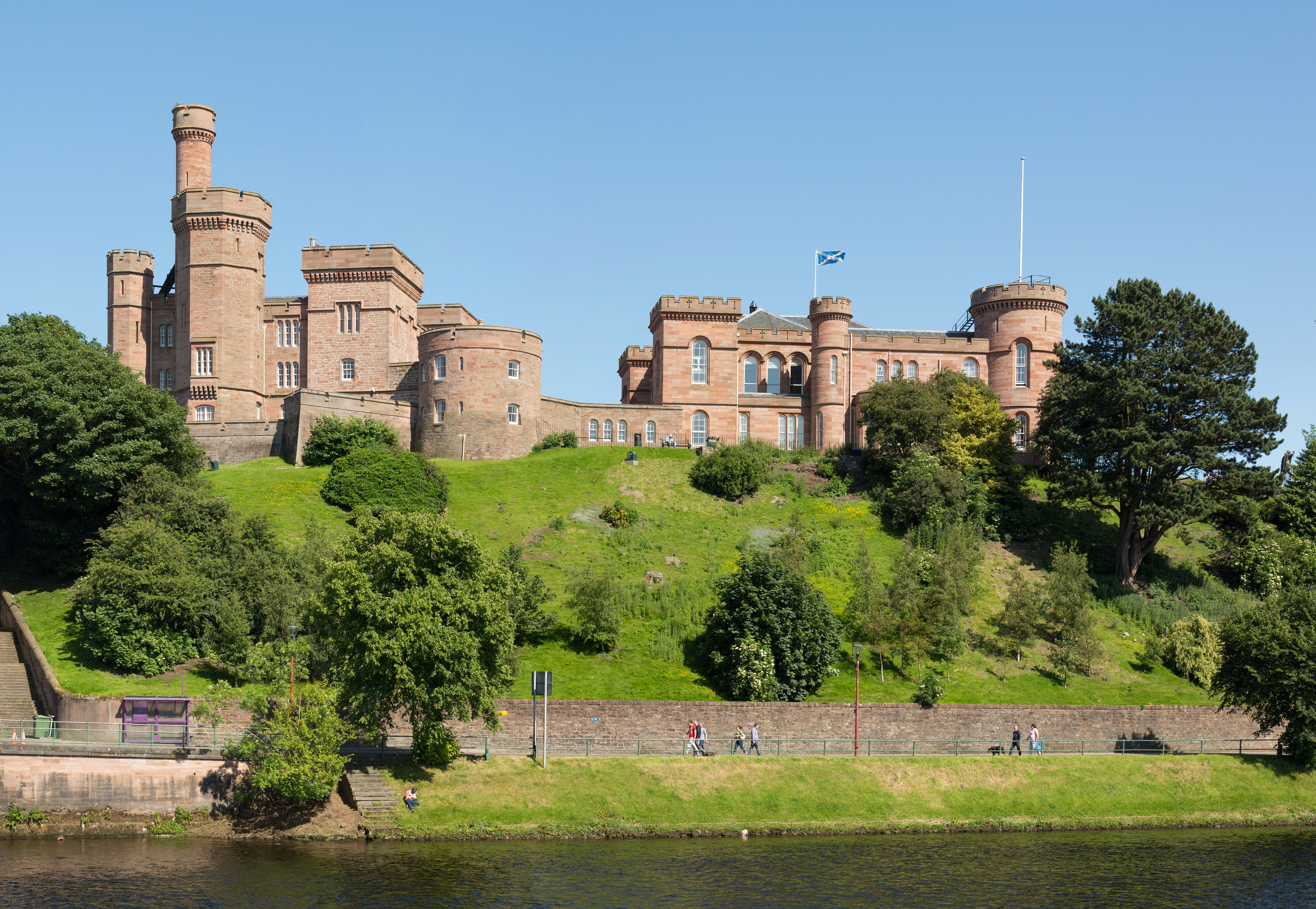
The Inverness Castle, Scotland

- January – Charles Barry wins the competition for the design of a new Palace of Westminster in London in Gothic Revival style.
- January 26 – Lansdowne Bridge in Lansdowne, New South Wales, Australia, designed by David Lennox, is opened.
- May 5 – St Ignatius Church, Preston, Lancashire, England, designed by Joseph John Scoles, is opened.
- July 29 – The Arc de Triomphe in Paris, completed by Jean-François Chalgrin following the death of Louis-Étienne Héricart de Thury, is inaugurated.
- October 4 – Rebuilt Christiania Theatre opens in Norway.
- Fleetwood Customs House in England, designed by Decimus Burton, is completed.
- Mexican Hothouse in the Jardin des Plantes, Paris, by Charles Rohault de Fleury, is completed; an early example of French glass and metal architecture.
- Glynnwood Plantation is built in Glynn, near Pointe Coupee, Louisiana.
- Inverness Castle, Scotland, designed by William Burn, is built.

== Publications ==
- August 4 – A. W. N. Pugin publishes his Contrasts, a treatise on the morality of Catholic Gothic architecture.

== Awards ==
- Grand Prix de Rome, architecture: François-Louis-Florimond Boulanger and Jean-Jacques Clerget.

== Births ==
- March 2 – E. R. Robson, English architect specialising in schools (died 1917)
- March 20 – James Cubitt, English architect specialising in nonconformist chapels (died 1912)

== Deaths ==
- June 7 – Henry A. Baker, Irish architect (born 1753)
