= Michel de Klerk =

Dutch architect (1884–1923)

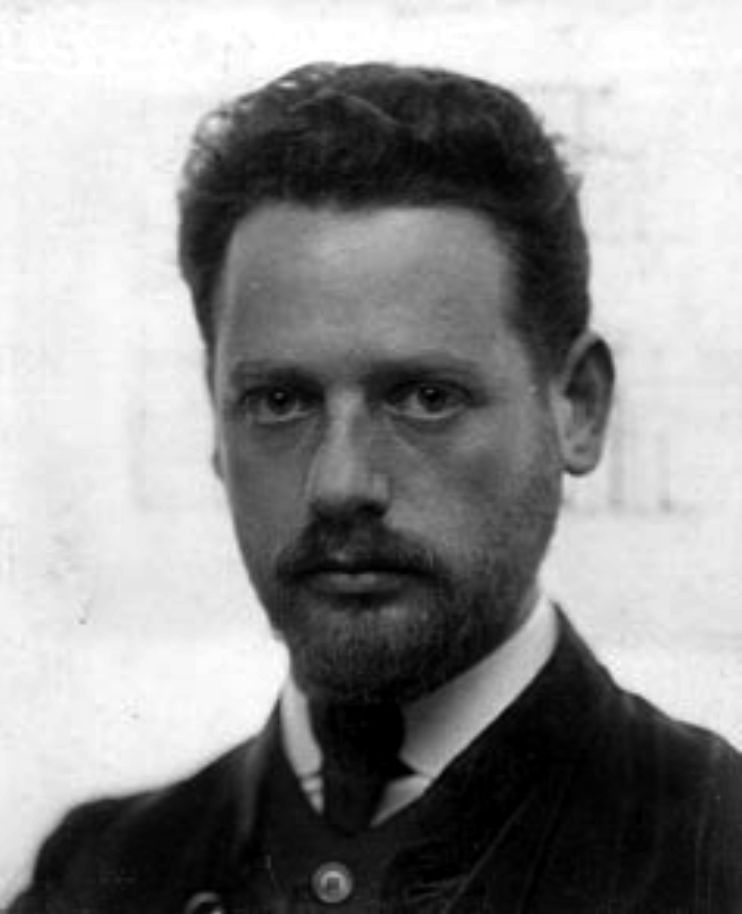
- Michel de Klerk (c. 1923)
- Born: 24 November 1884; Amsterdam, Netherlands
- Died: 24 November 1923 (aged 39); Amsterdam, Netherlands
- Occupation: Architect
- Spouse: Lea Jessurun (m. 1910)
- Buildings: Het Schip

Michel de Klerk (24 November 1884 – 24 November 1923) was a Dutch architect. Born to a Jewish family, he was one of the founding architects of the movement Amsterdam School, a part of the larger Expressionist movement. Early in his career he worked for other architects, including Eduard Cuypers. For a while, he also employed the Indonesian-born Liem Bwan Tjie, who later became his country's most notable proponent of the Amsterdam School and modern architecture. Of his many designs, very few have actually been built. One of his most notable completed buildings is Het Schip (lit. 'The Ship') in the Amsterdam district of Spaarndammerbuurt.

== Amsterdam West ==
Eigen Haard (Own Hearth), working-class Socialist housing, consisting of three groups of buildings:

- (1) Spaarndammerplantsoen, North side (1913–1915)
- (2) Spaarndammerplantsoen, South side (1915–1916)
- (3) 'Het Schip', Zaanstraat / Oostzaanstraat / Hembrugstraat (1917–1920)
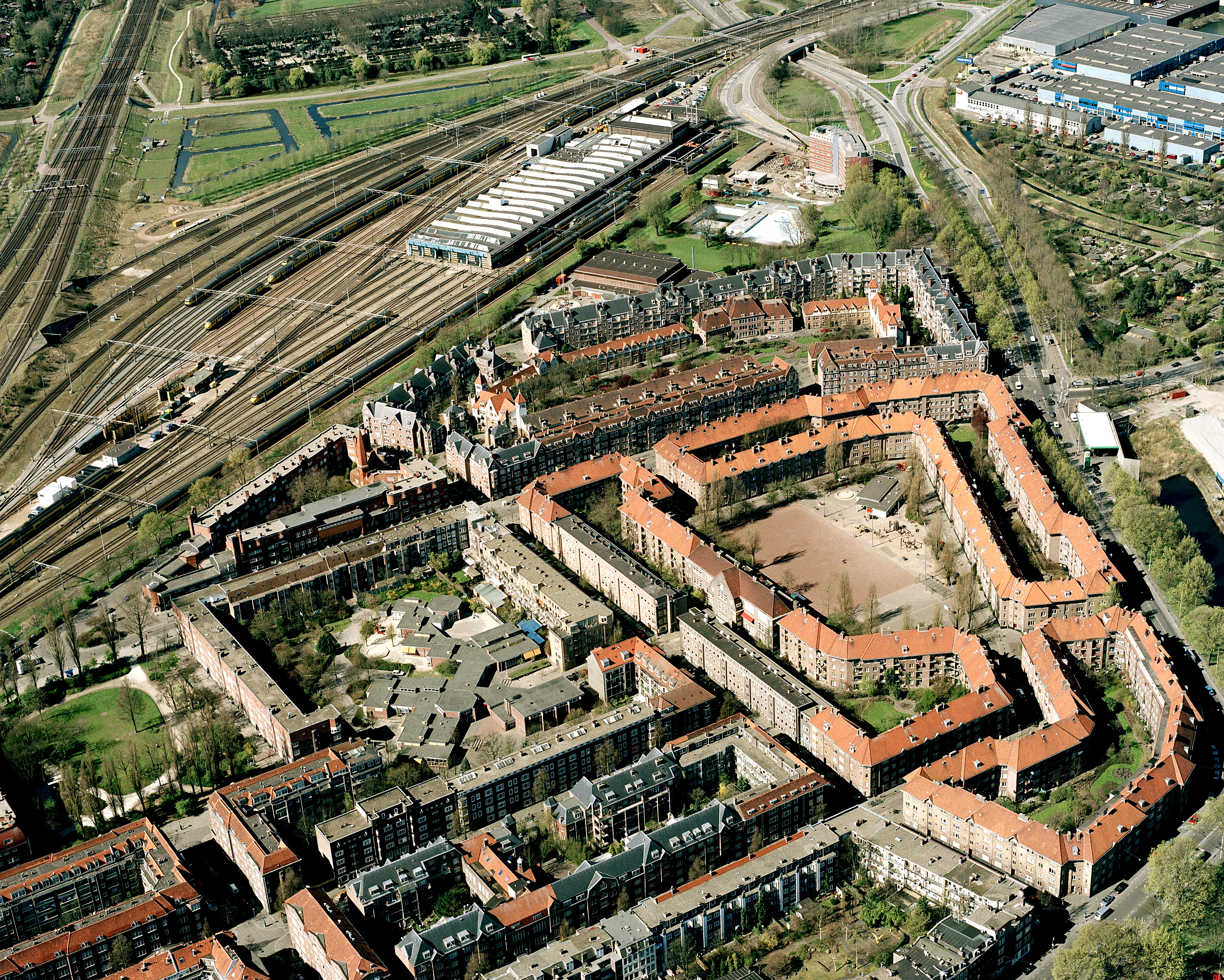
Air view, Eigen Haard (left)

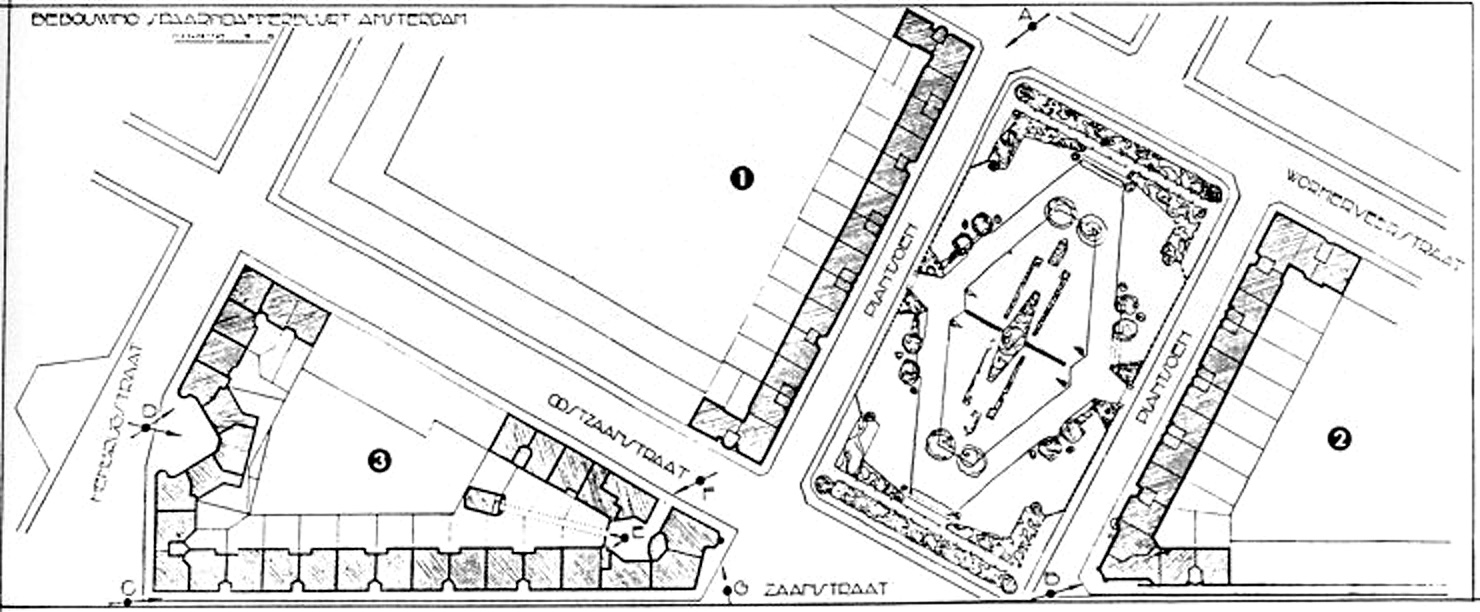
Situation plan: (3) (1) (2)
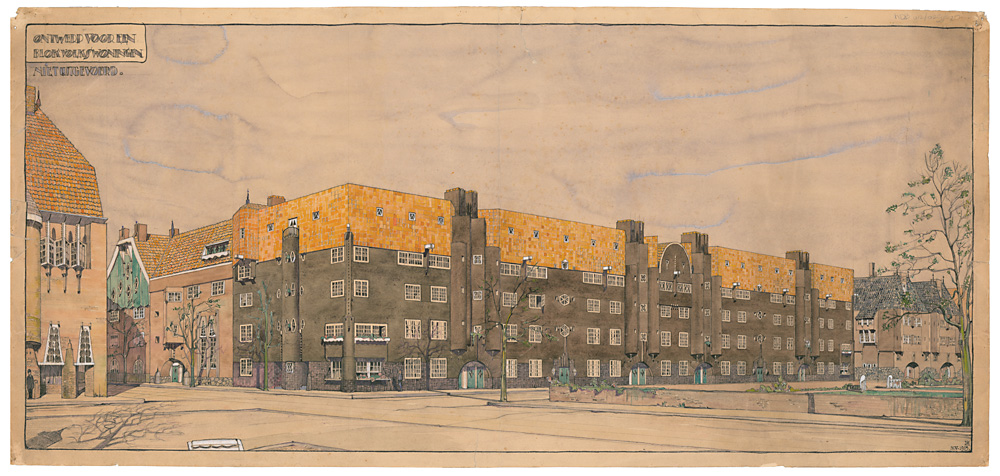
(1) Spaarndammer- plantsoen, North side

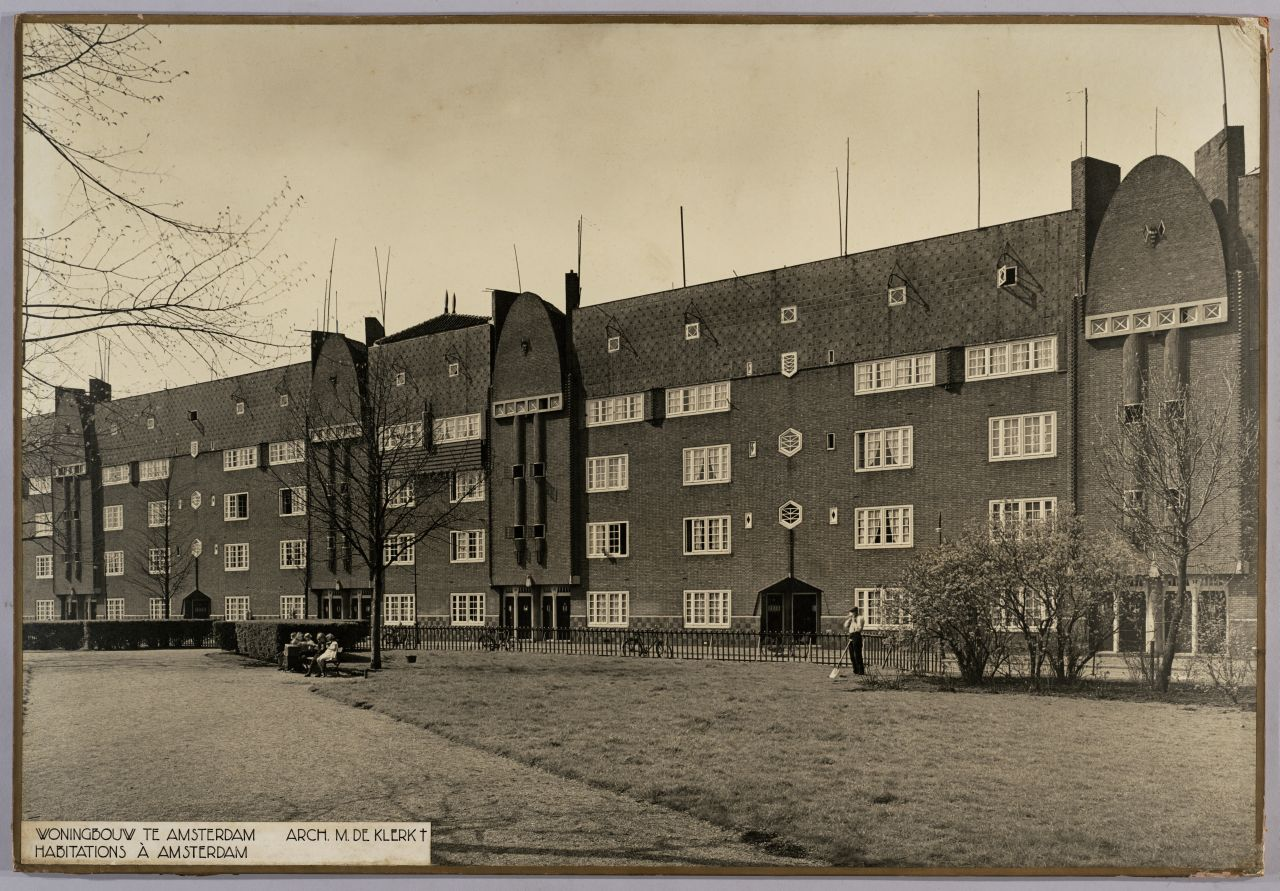
Original state, 1915

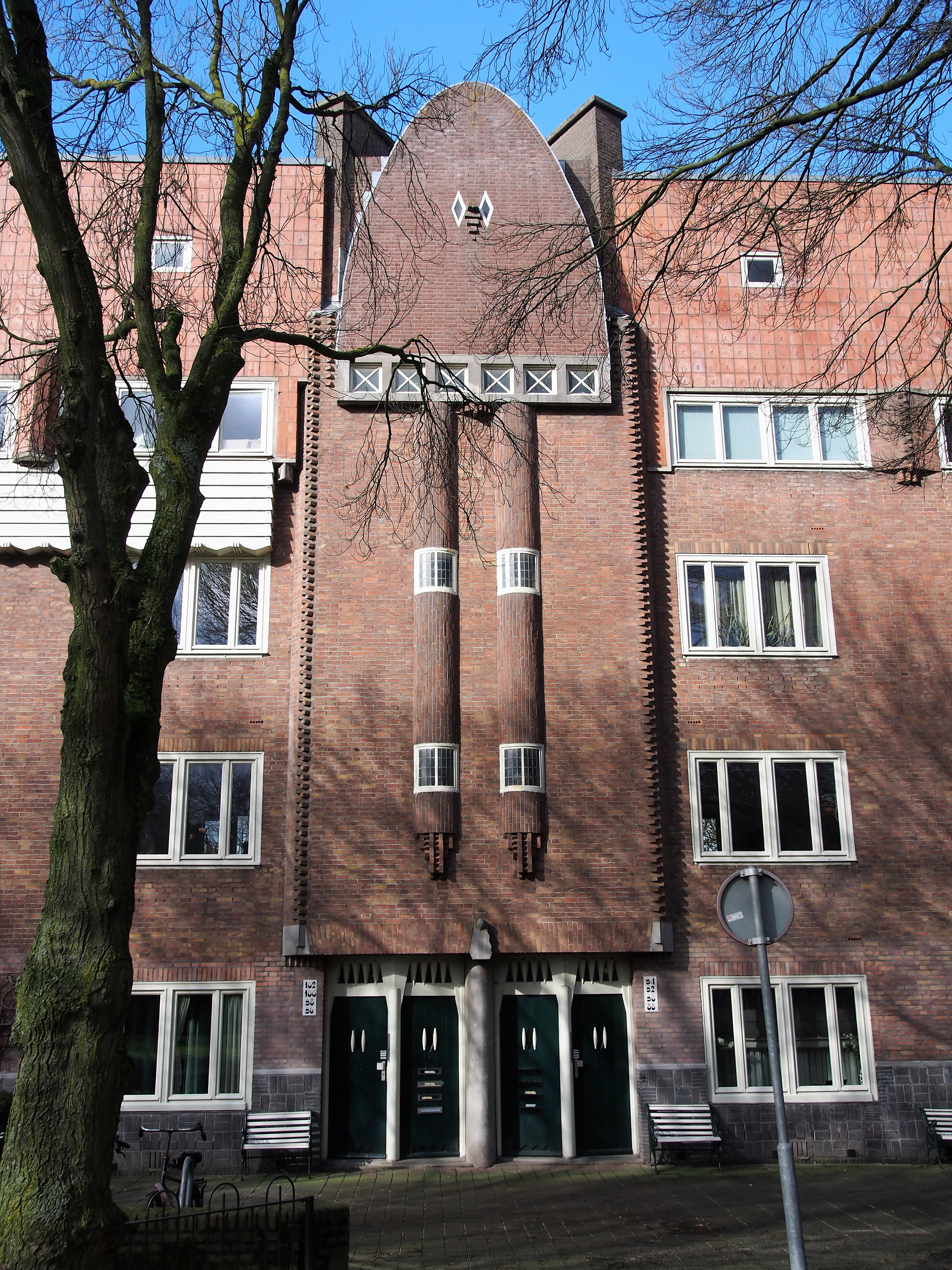

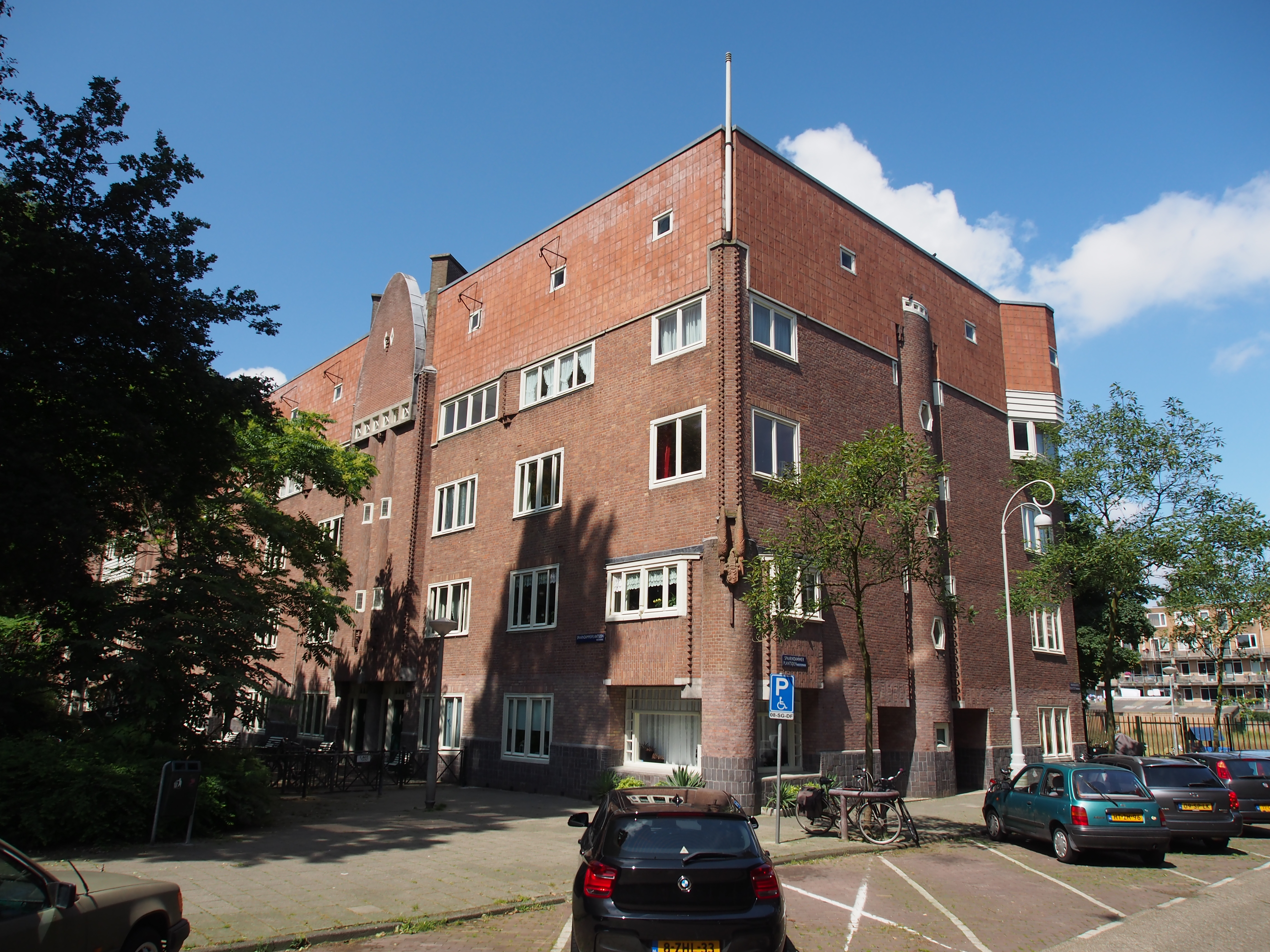
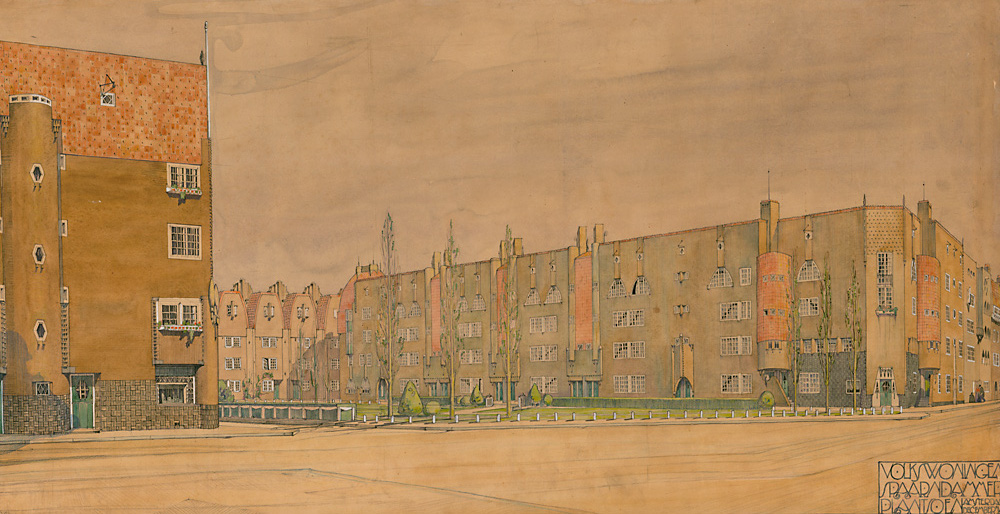
(2) Spaarndammer- plantsoen, South side

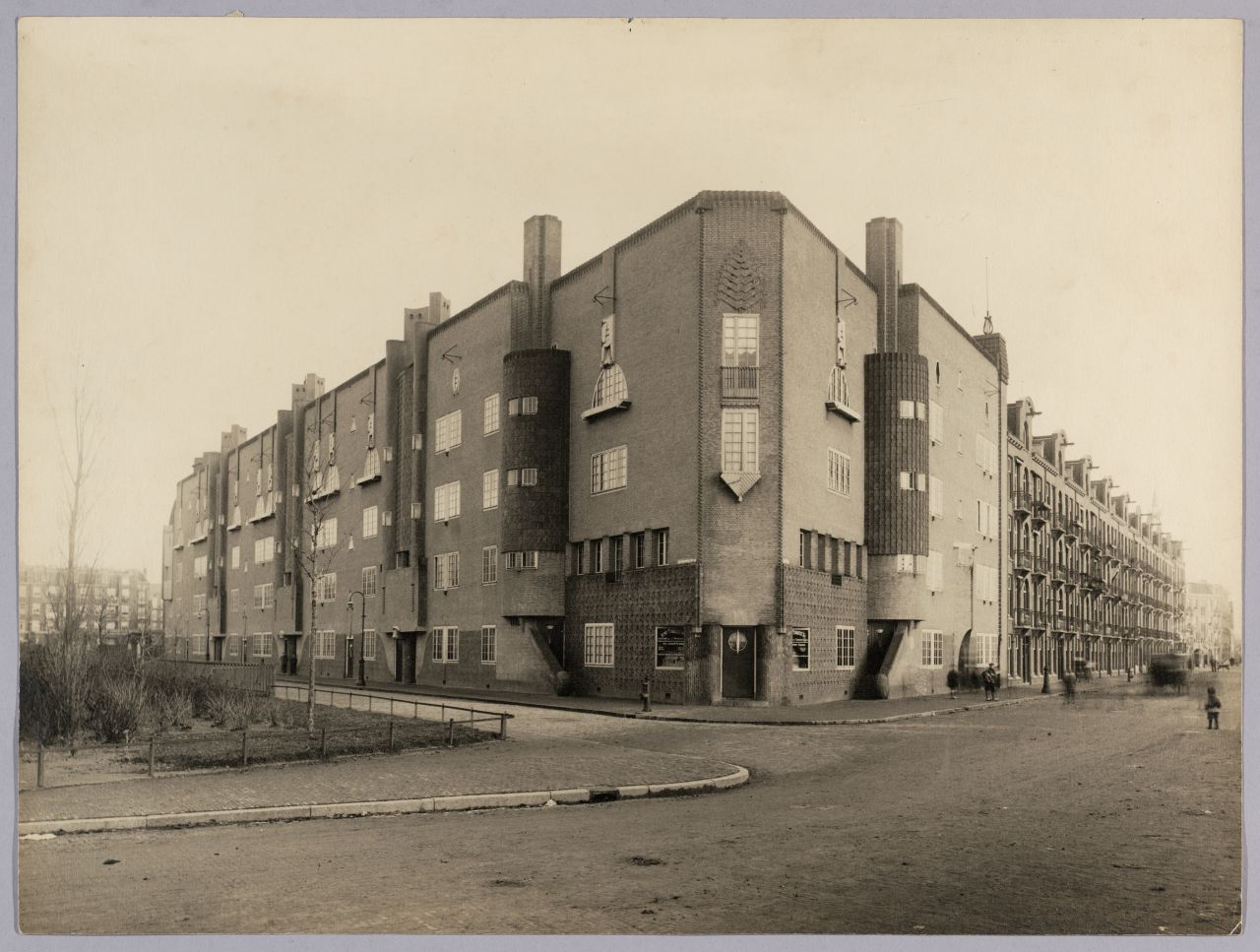
Original state, 1916

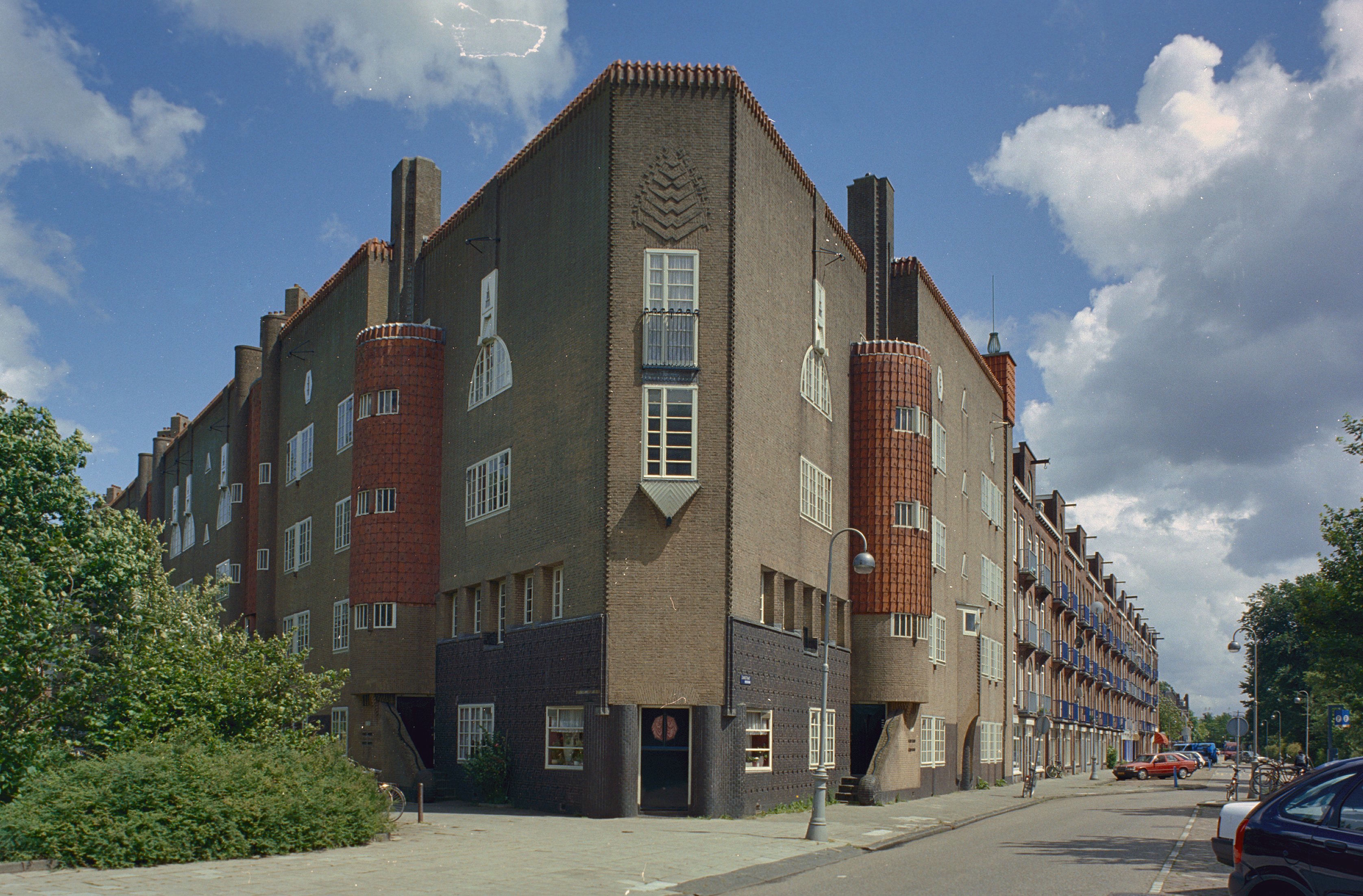

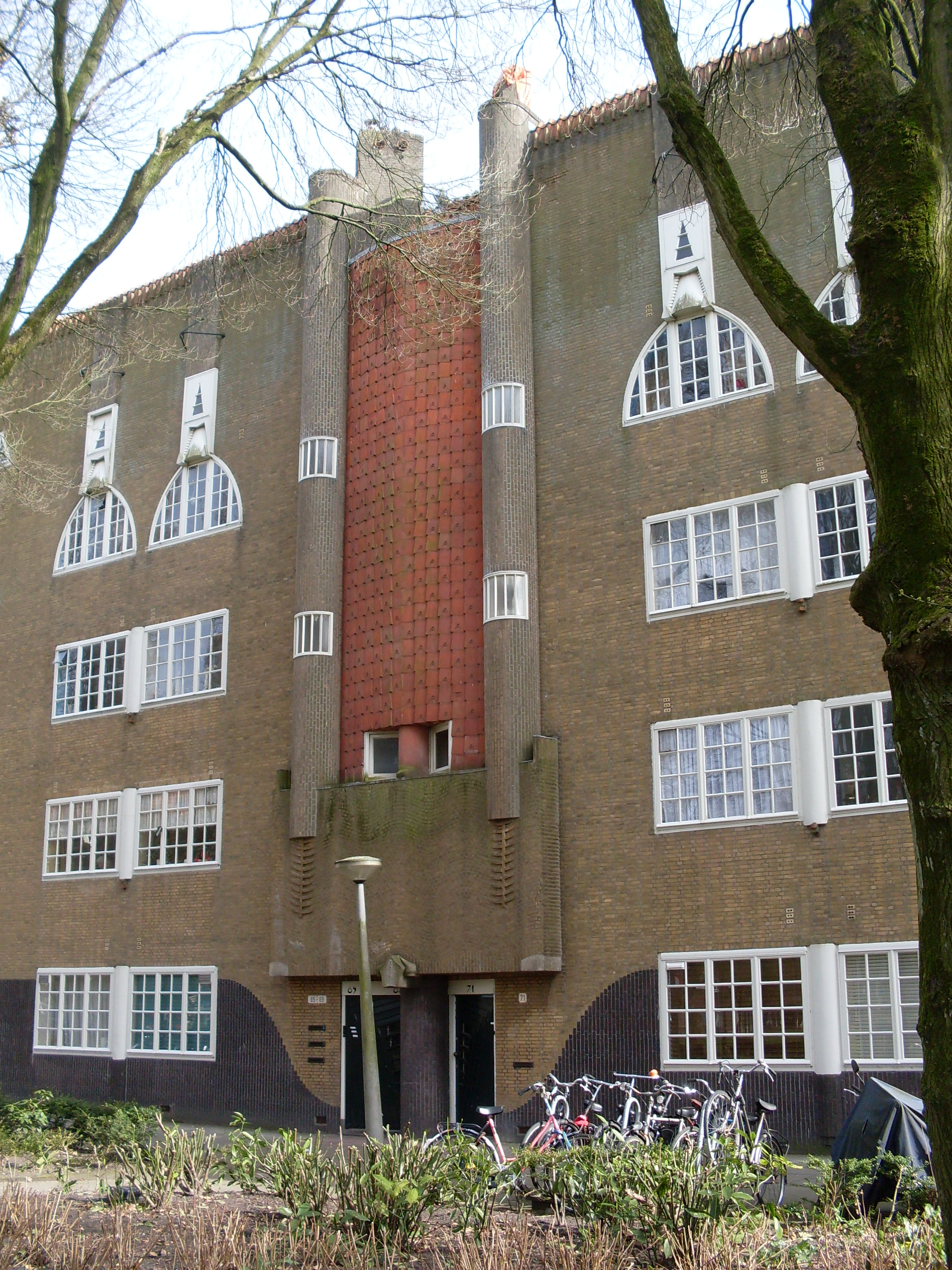

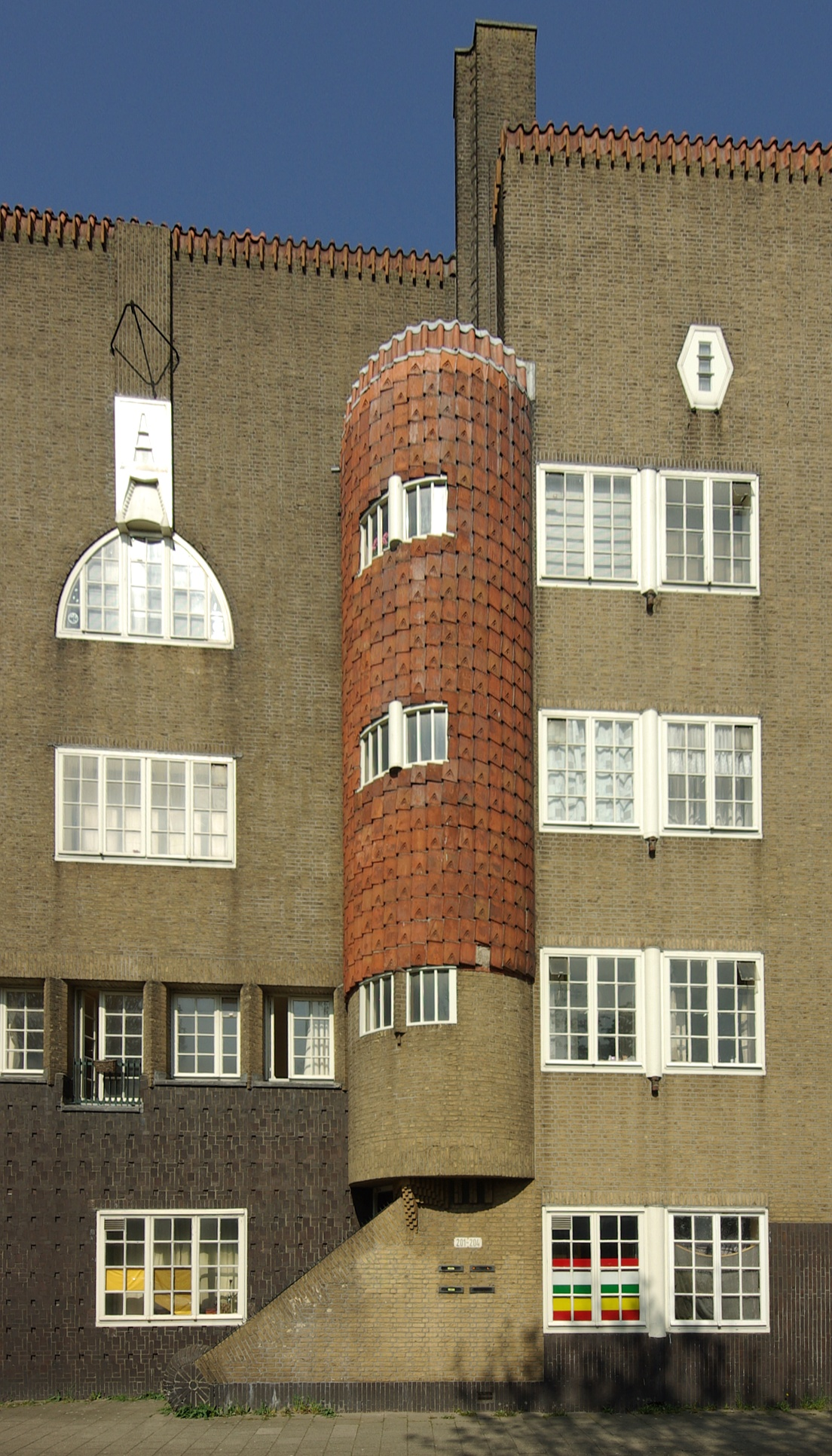
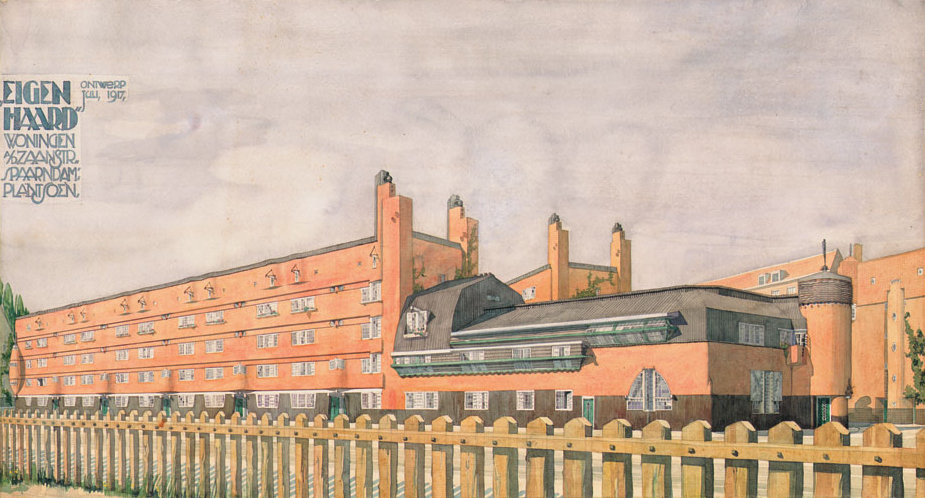
(3) 'Het Schip', Zaanstraat

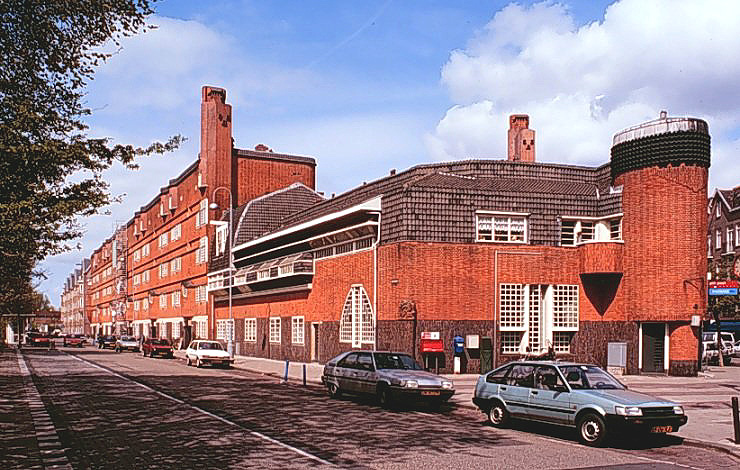
Zaanstraat

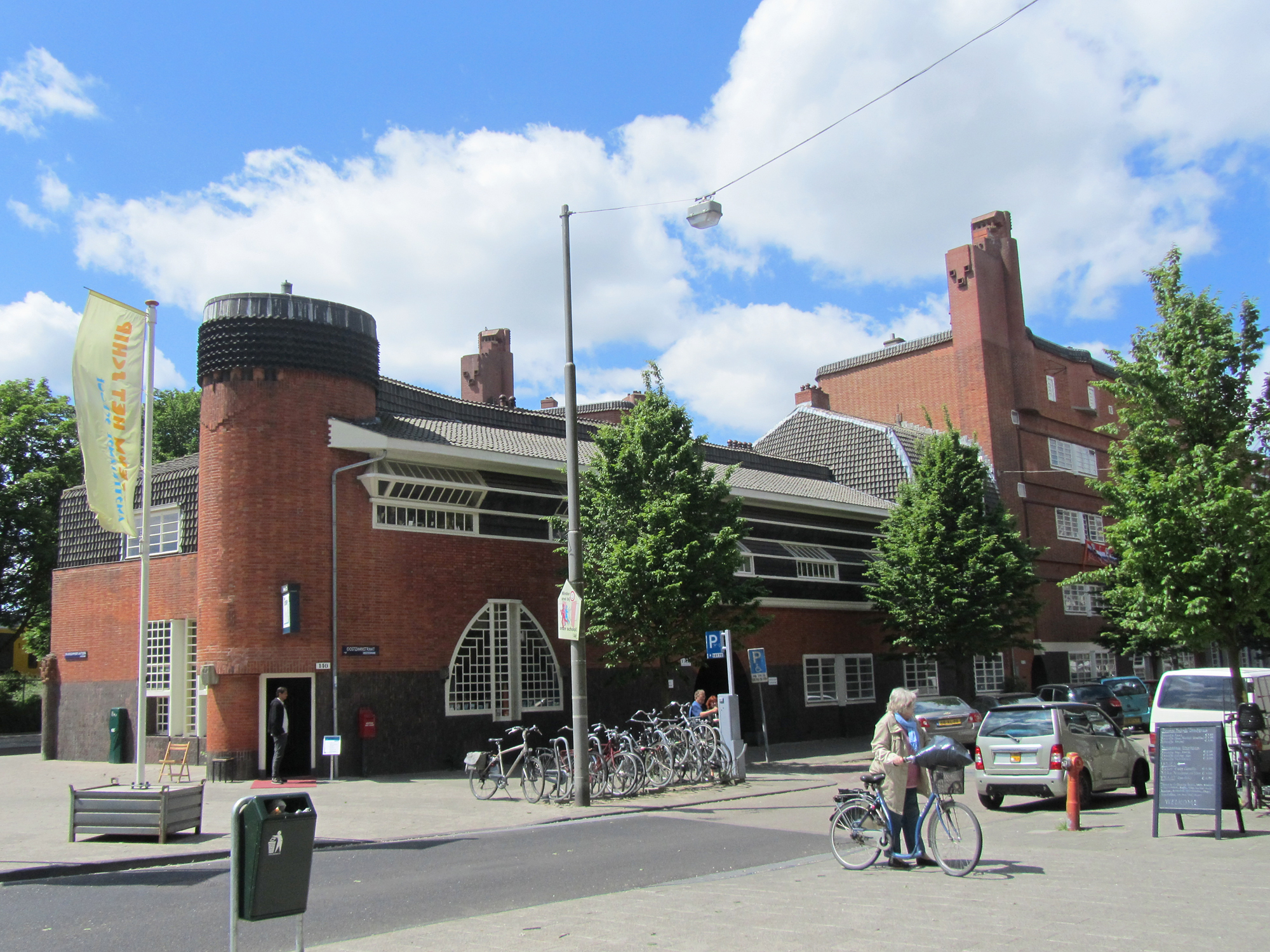
Oostzaanstraat

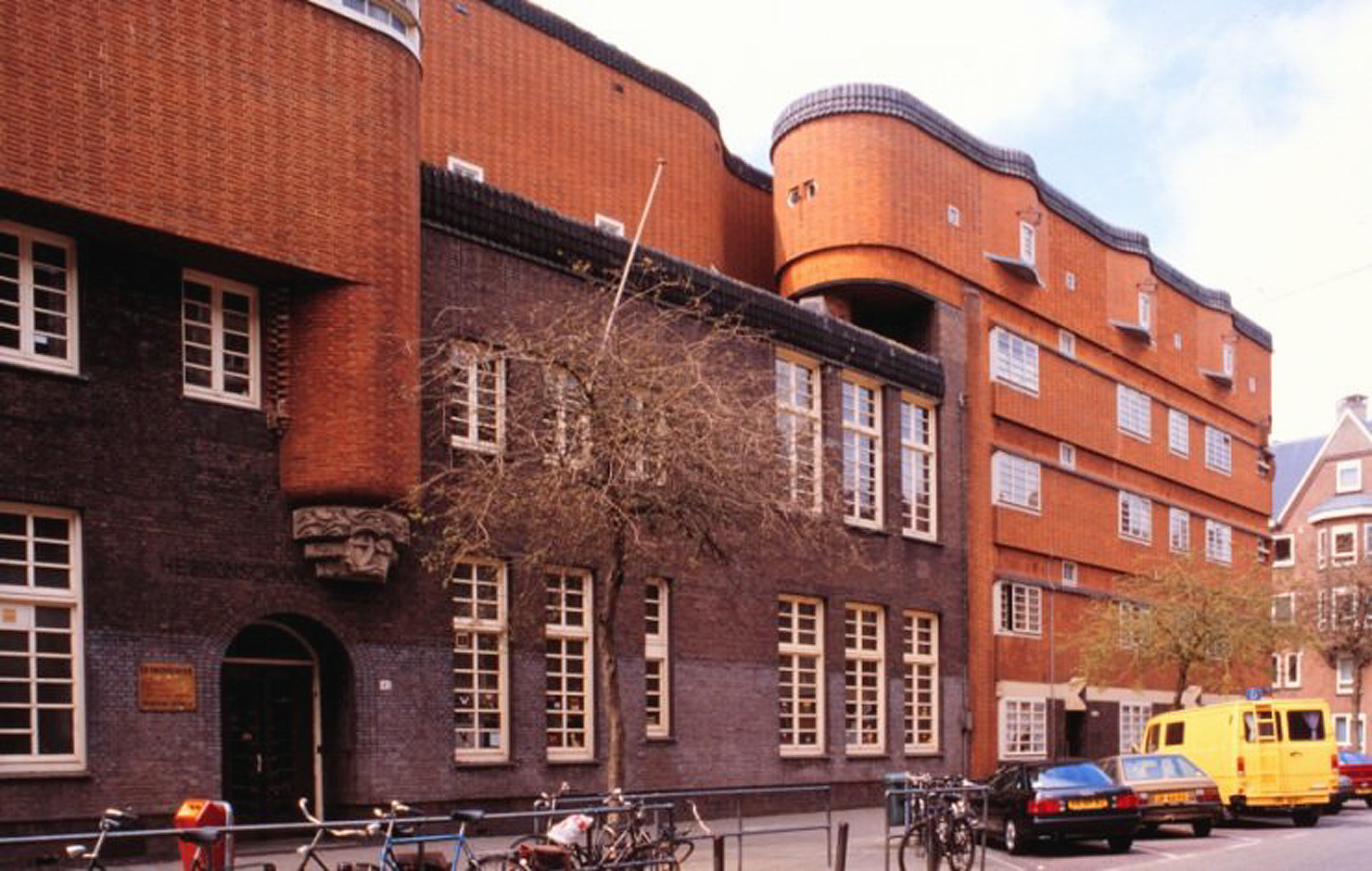
Oostzaanstraat

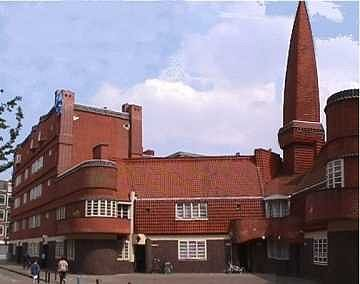
Hembrugstraat

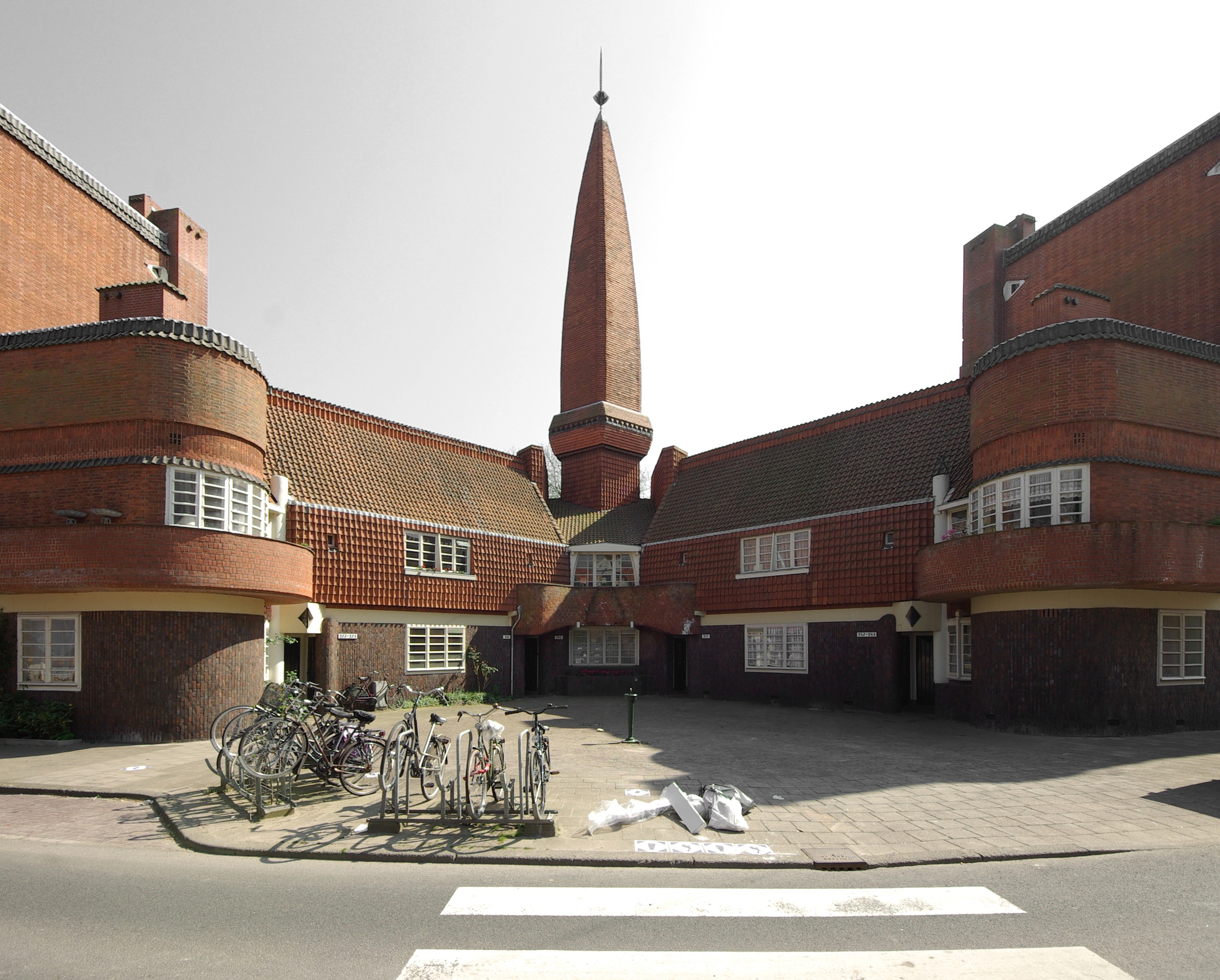

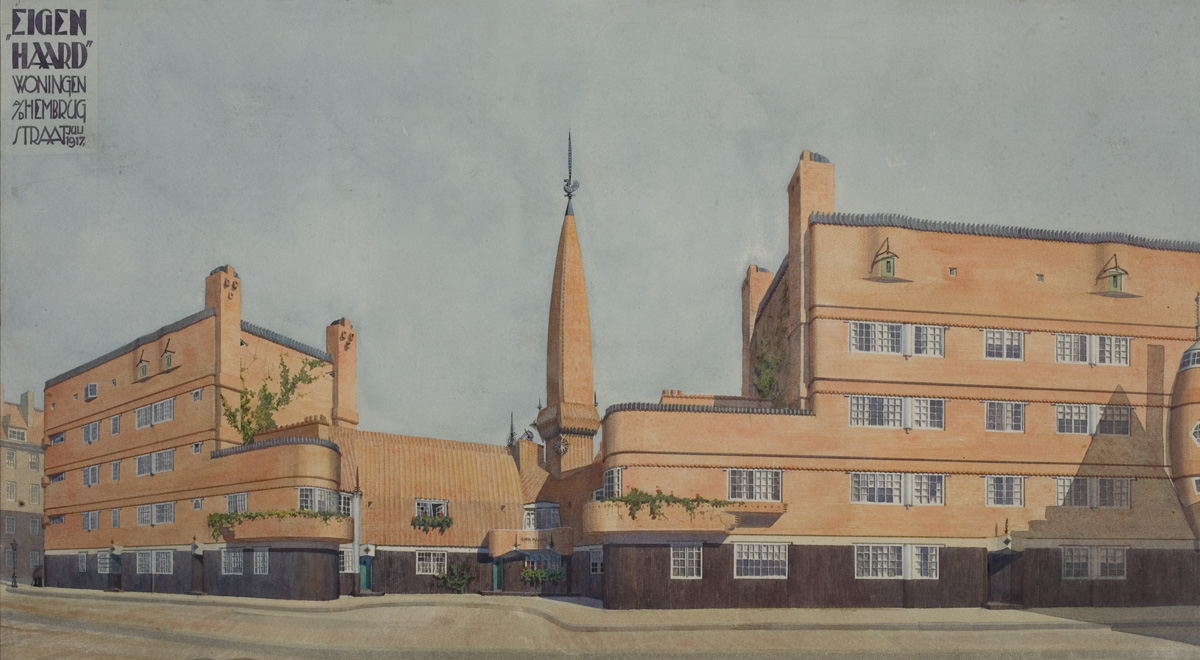
Hembrugstraat

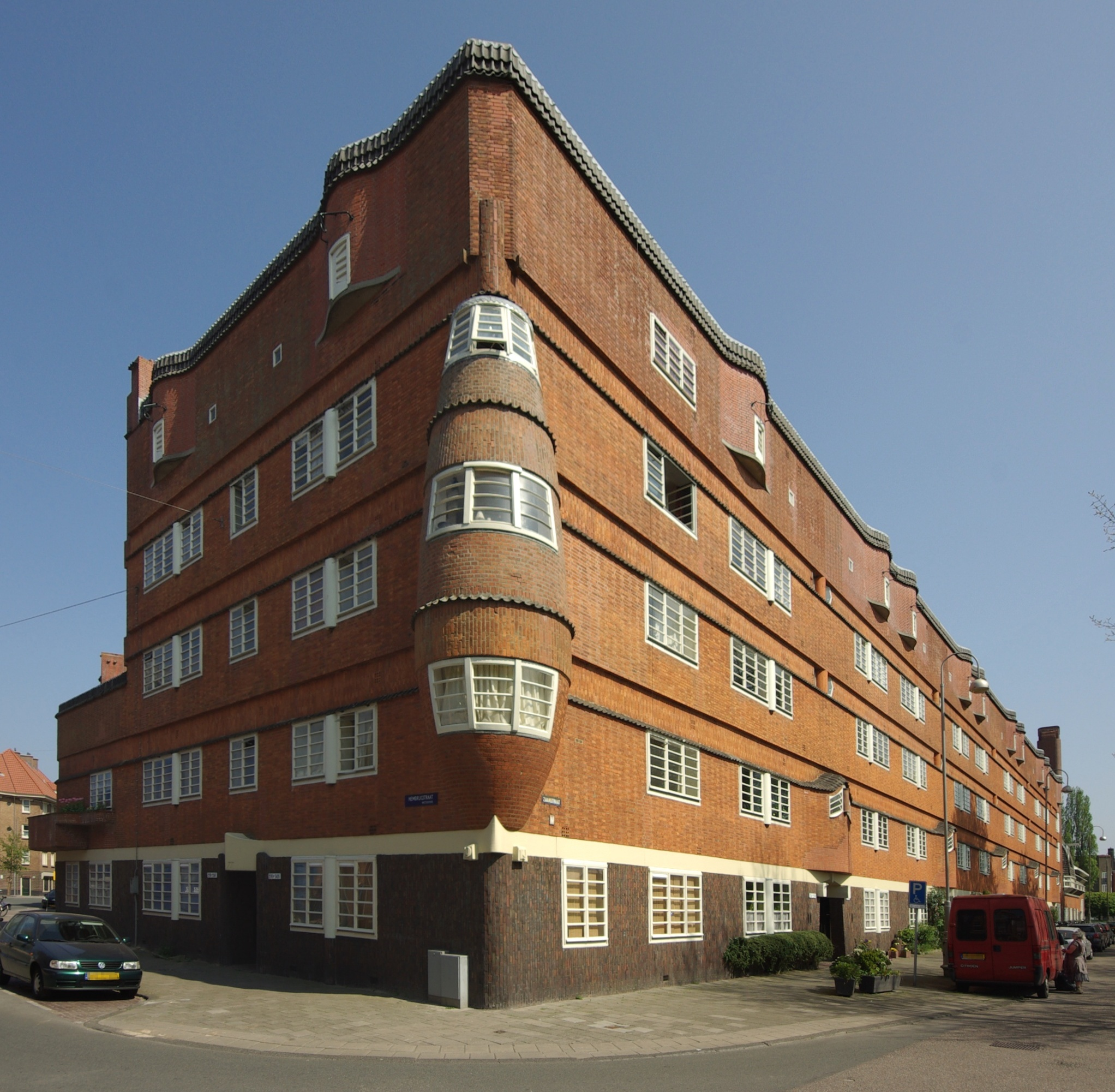
Zaanstraat

== Amsterdam South ==
De Dageraad (The Dawn), working-class Socialist housing by Michel de Klerk and Piet Kramer (1920–1923). The architectural contribution by Michel de Klerk is shown in this article. See also Piet Kramer.

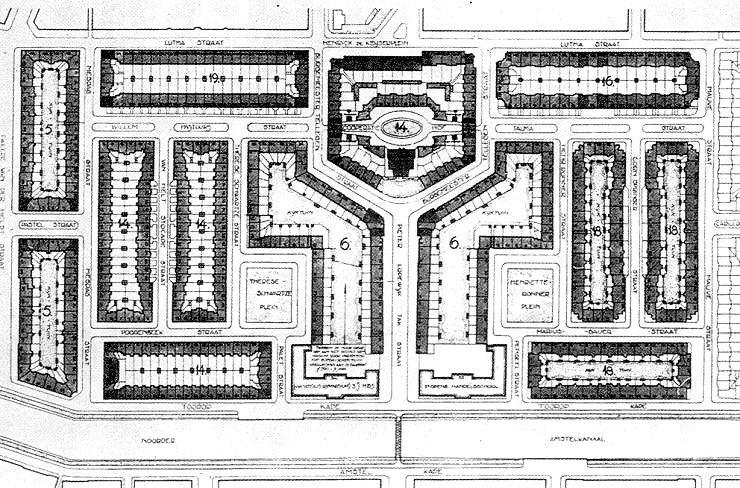
Situation plan

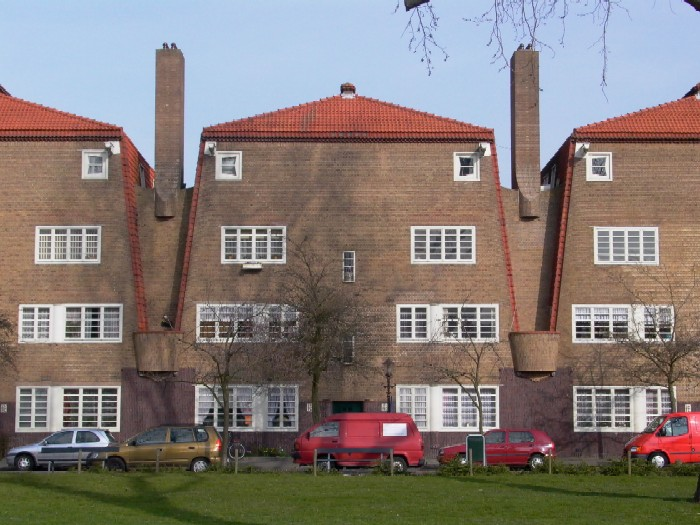
Thérèse Schwartzeplein (Henriette Ronnerplein)

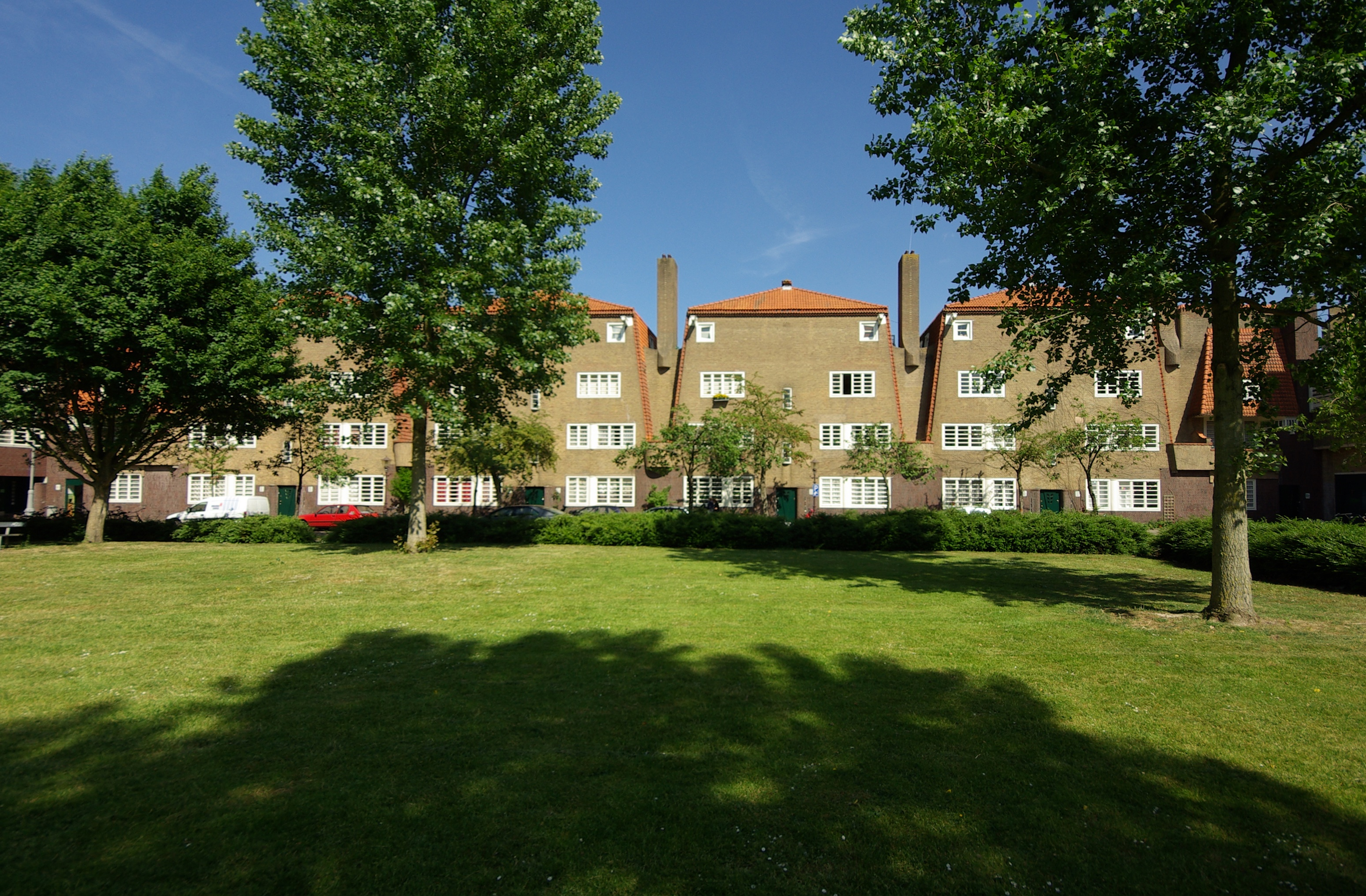
Thérèse Schwartzeplein

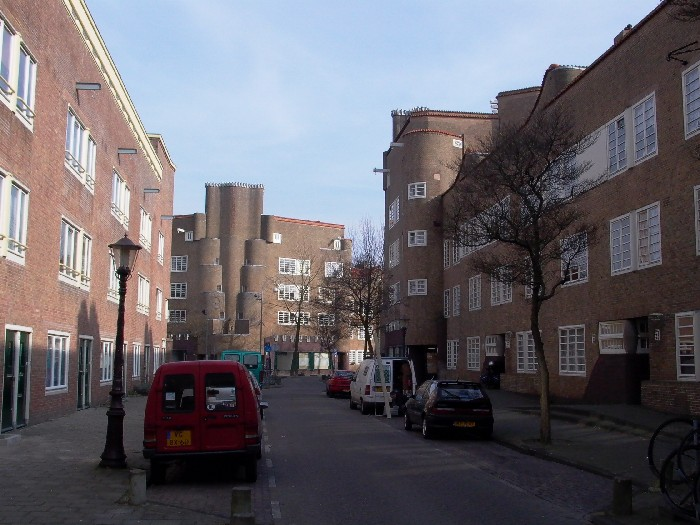
Burg. Tellegenstraat, de Klerk (r), Kramer (m)

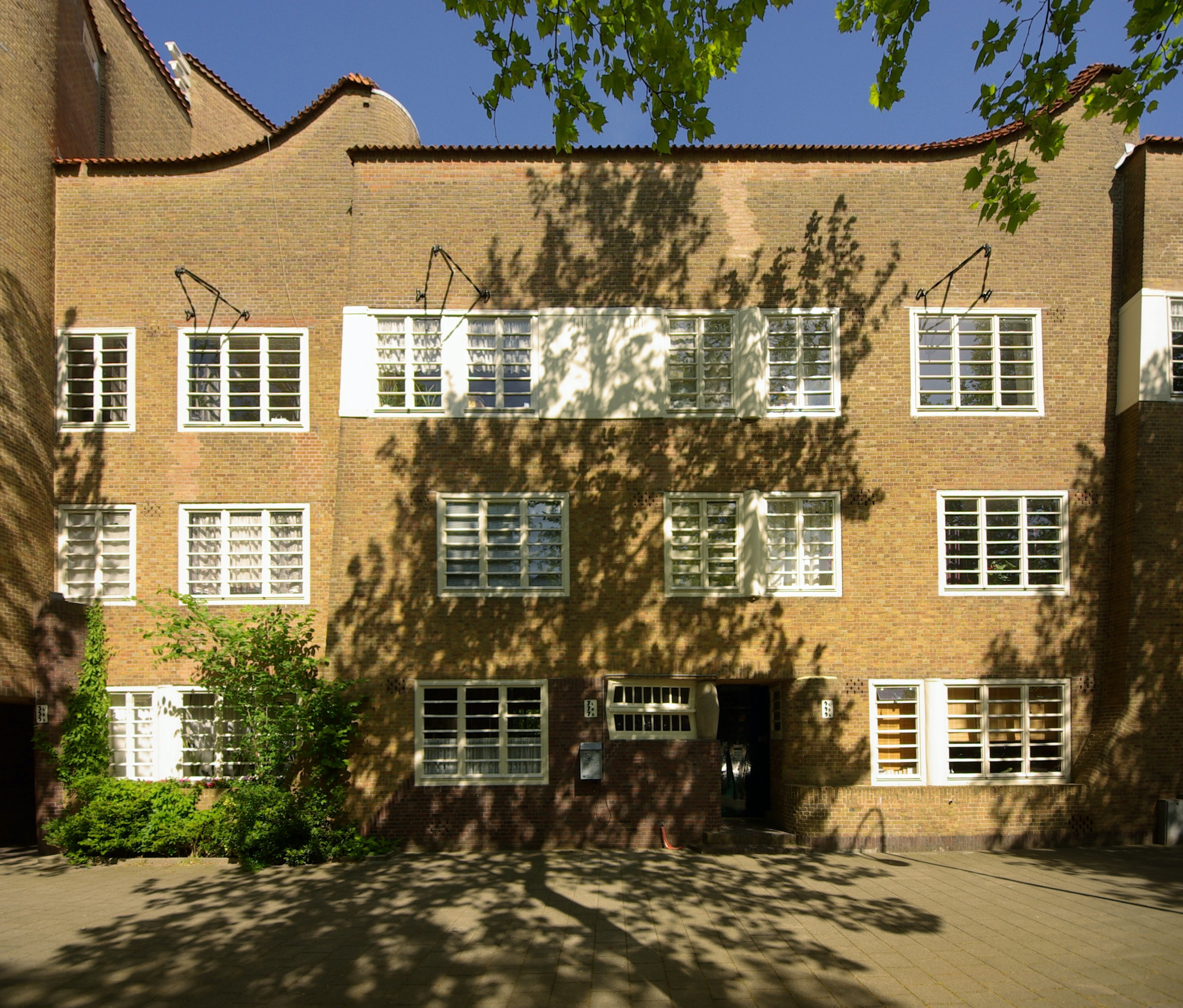
Facades with sloping lines by de Klerk

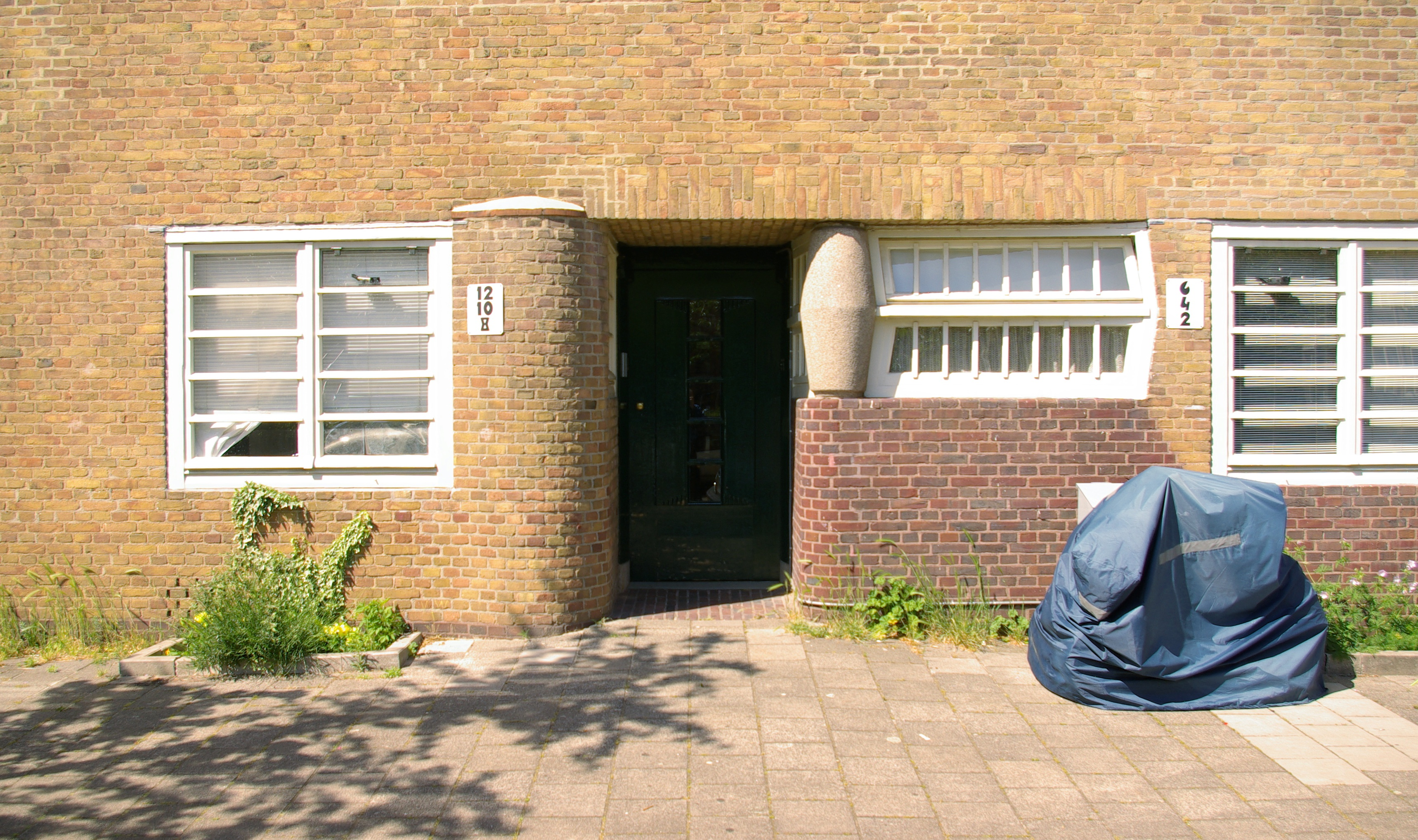
Entrance
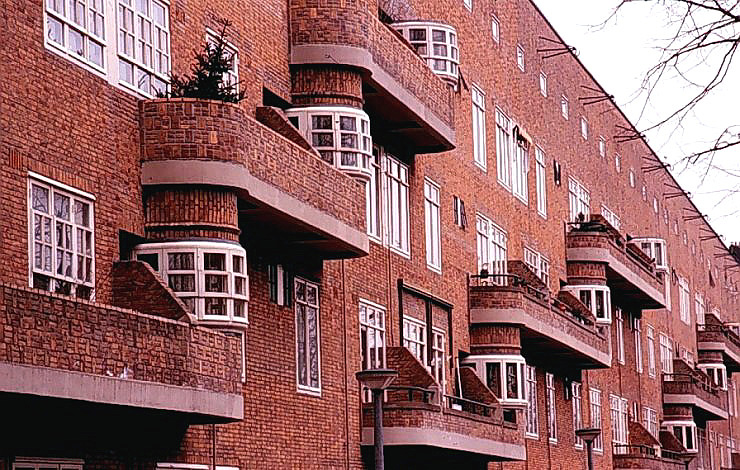
Vrijheidslaan, middle-class housing (1921–1923)

== Wendingen ==
Buildings, projects and drawings by Michel de Klerk are published in the architecture and art magazine Wendingen (1918–1932). Three covers of this magazine are designed by de Klerk.

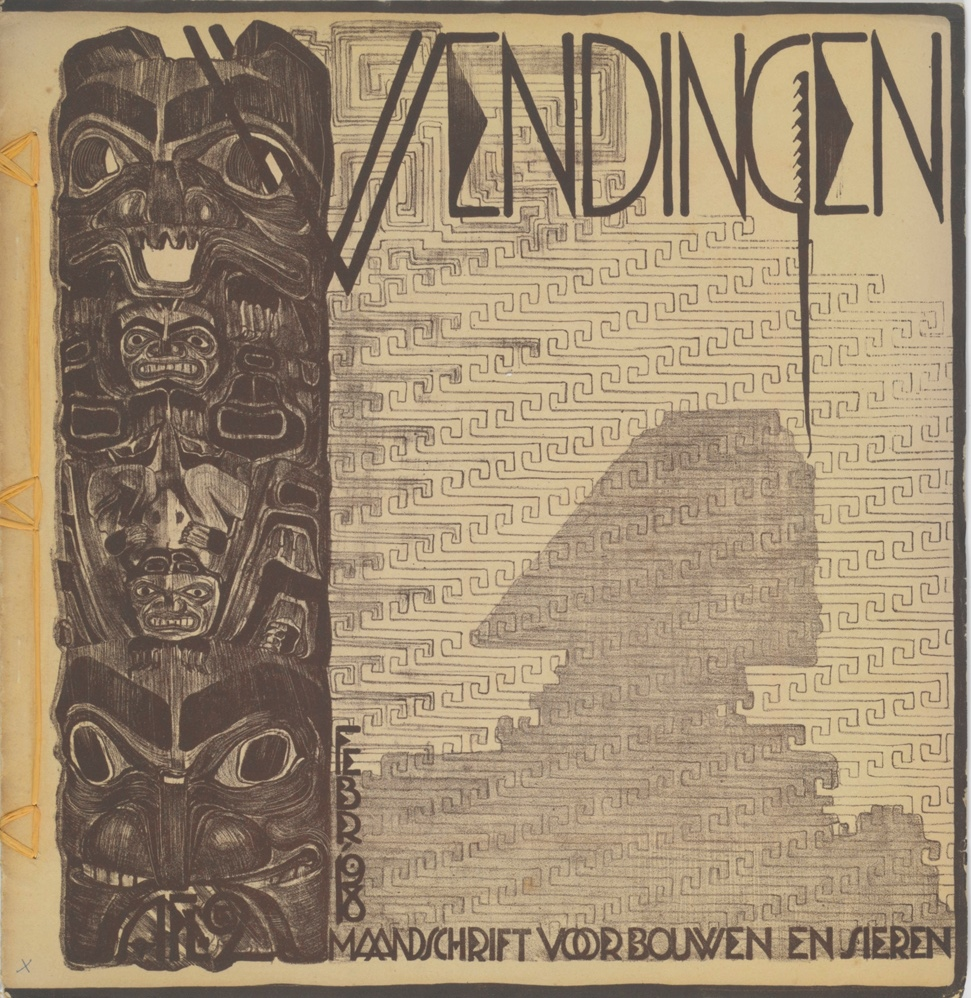
1918-2, cover

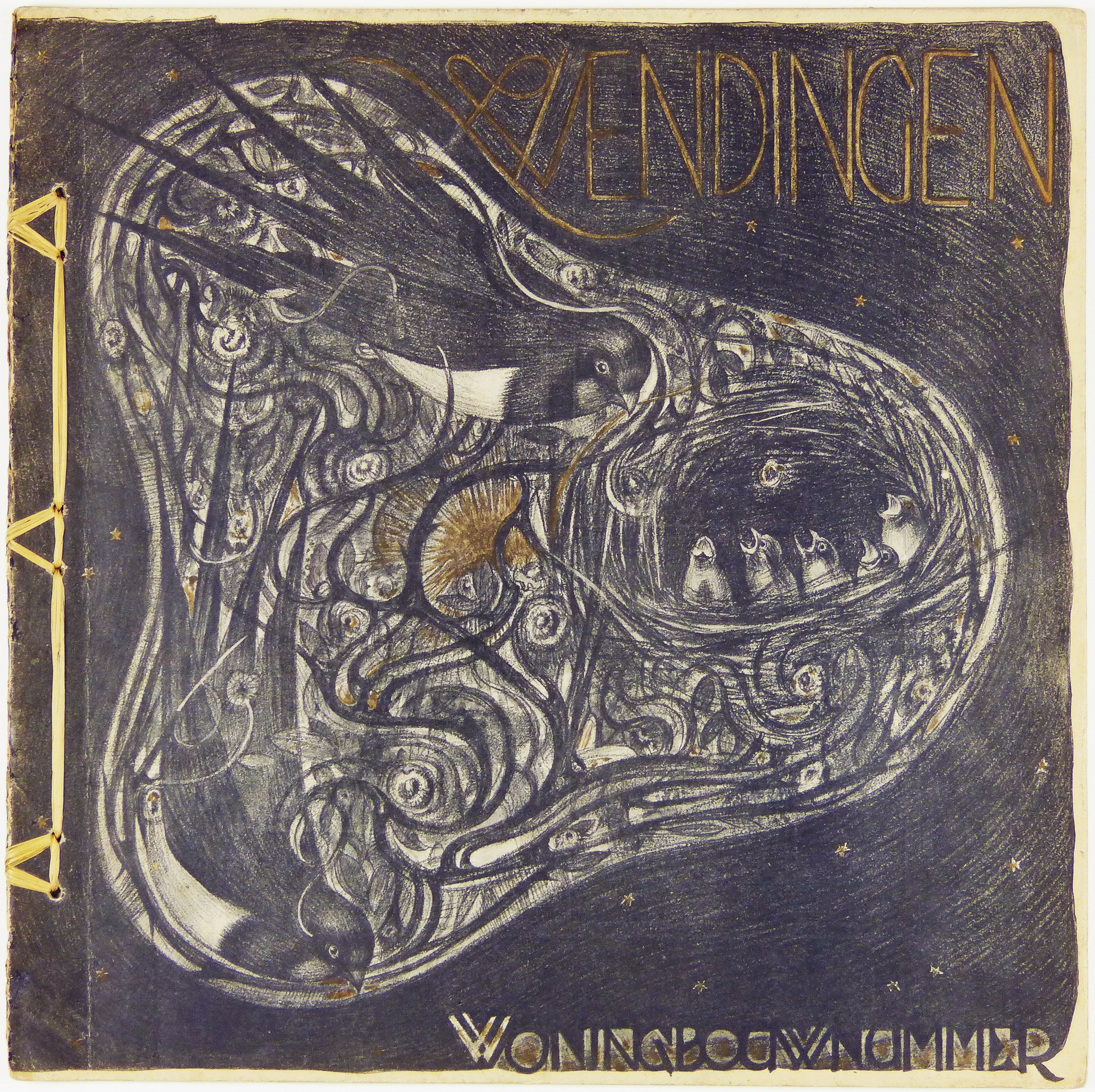
1920-3/4, cover

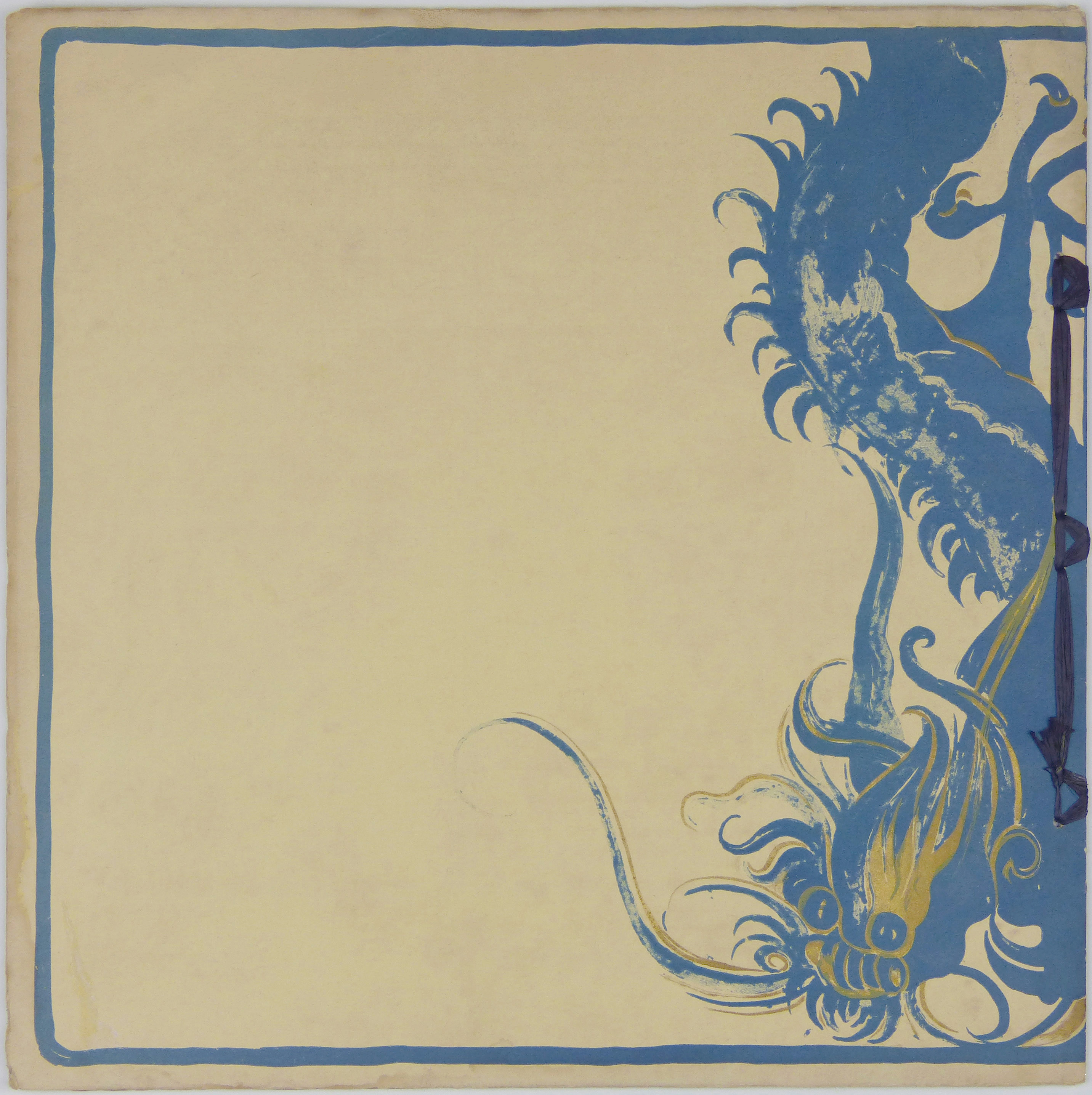
1921-3, cover (back)

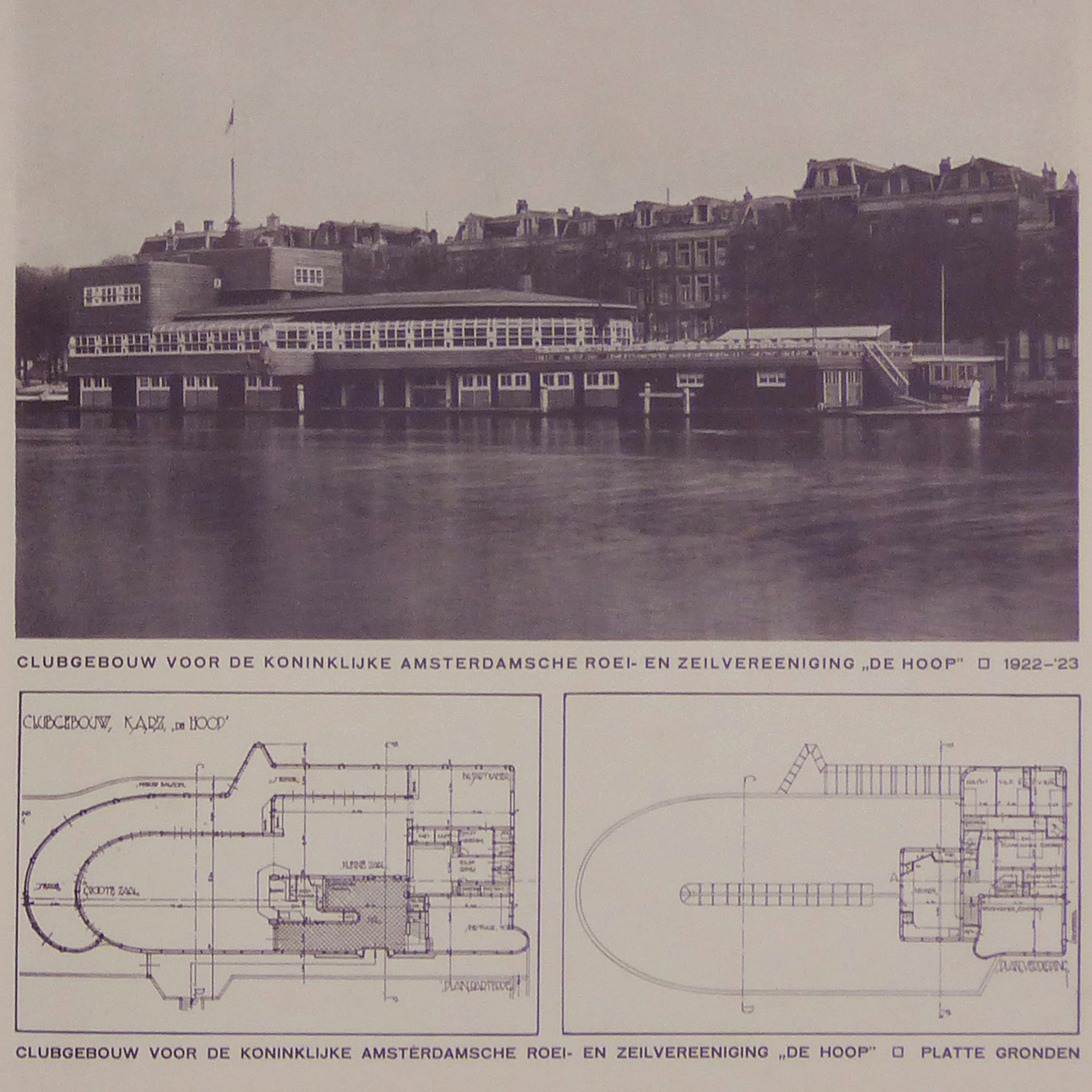
1924-9/10, buildings

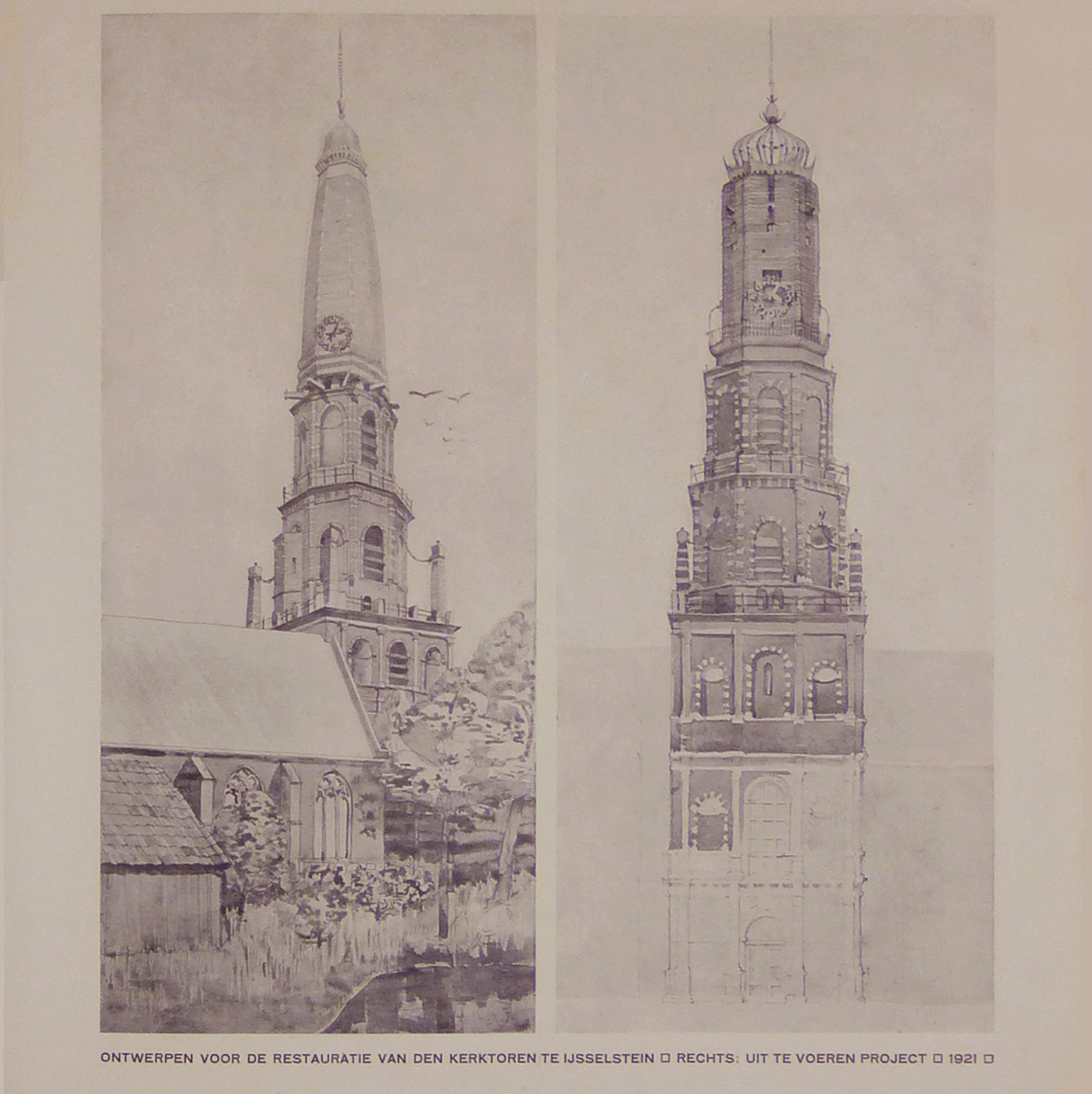
1924-4/5, projects

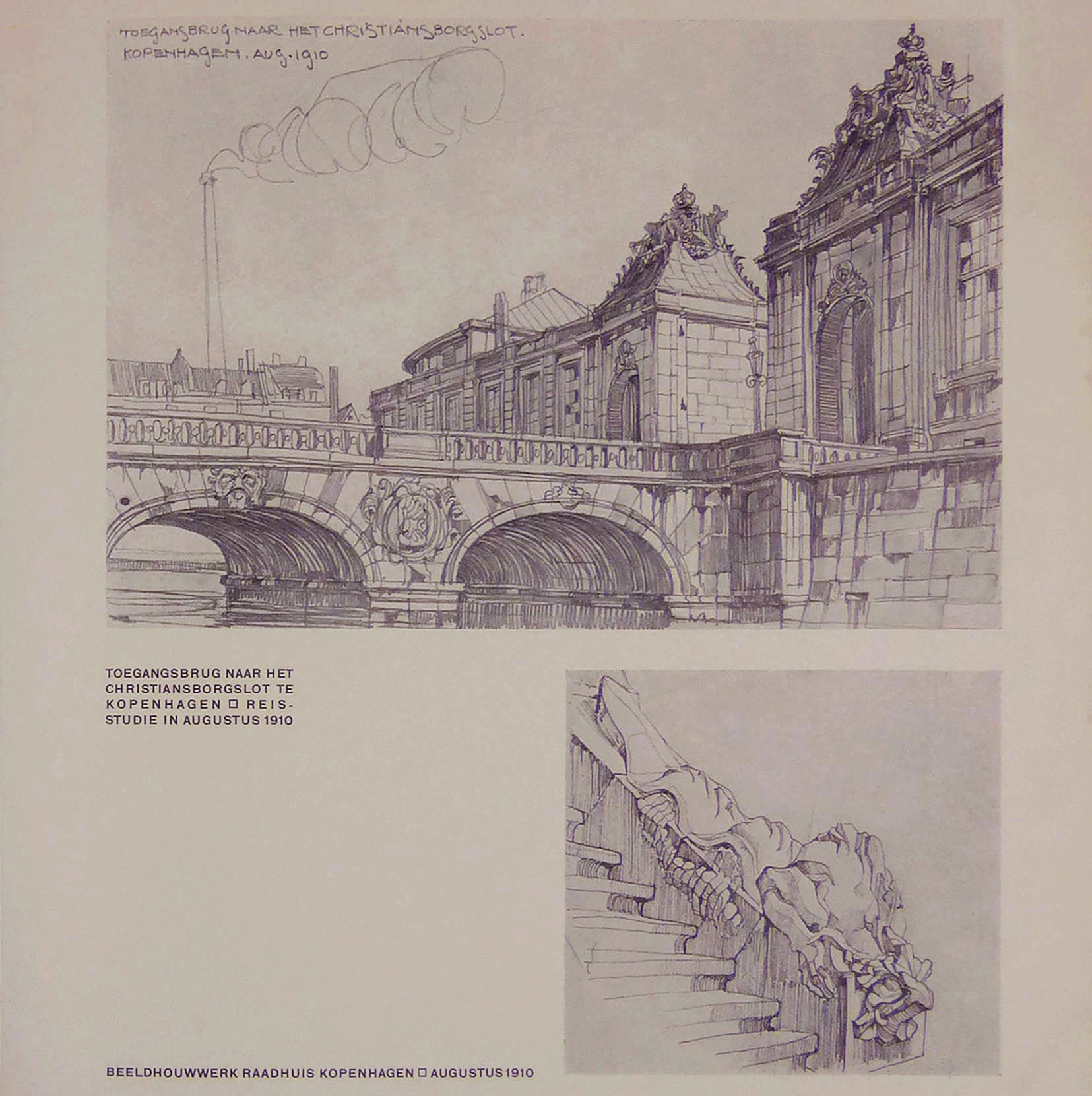
1924-2, drawings

== Bibliography ==
- Suzanne S. Frank, Michel de Klerk 1884-1923 - An Architect of the Amsterdam School, UMI Research Press, Ann Arbor Mich. 1984
- Manfred Bock, Sigrid Johanisse & Vladimir Stissi, Michel de Klerk 1884-1923 - Architect and Artist of the Amsterdam School, NAI Publishers, Rotterdam 1997
- Wim de Wit, The Amsterdam School - Dutch Expressionist Architecture 1915-1930, Rotterdam 1983
- Maristella Casciato, The Amsterdam School, Rotterdam 1996
- Joseph Buch, A Century of Architecture in The Netherlands, NAI Publishers, Rotterdam 1995
