= Tanghe River Park =

Park in Qinhuangdao, China

Tanghe River Park is located in the Chinese city of Qinhuangdao. It was created on the coast of Tanghe River in July 2006, and is home to the Red Ribbon, a red steel bench which stretches for half a kilometre through the park. The Ribbon has won an honor award from the American Society of Landscape Architects, and was chosen by the readers of Condé Nast Traveler magazine as one of the seven wonders of the architectural world.

Along the Red Ribbon's steel bench there are various plants planted every so often along the river park bench. The bench has four pavilions that are shaped like clouds making it a unique structure to help protect against weather. The pavilions are places for the visitors of the park to gather for social meetings that give the people an interesting aesthetic. The ecological processes and natural sites are intact, which are two attributes that are in high regards of visitors.

== Landscape Architects ==
Lin Shihong, Chen Chen, Niu Jin, Hong Wei, He Jun, Ning Weijing, Li Yao.
