= Nisse Strinning =

Swedish architect and designer

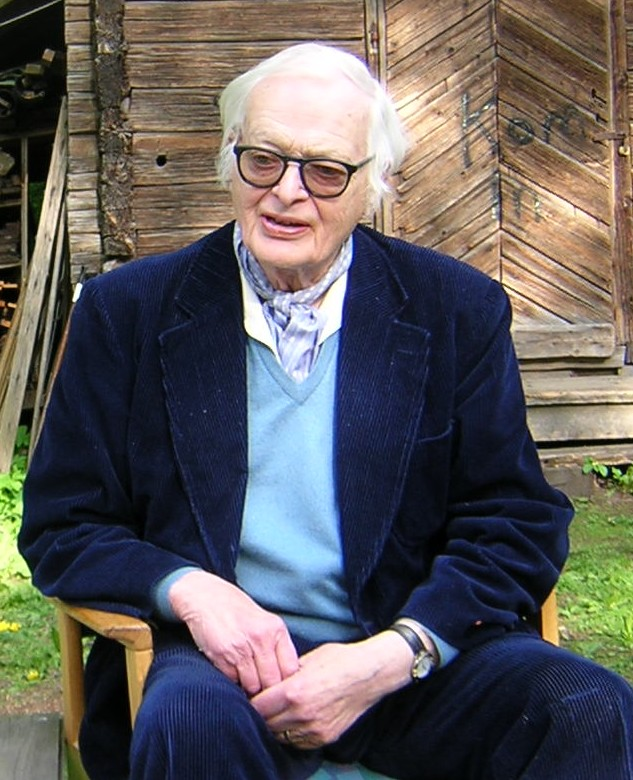
Nisse Strinning in 2003

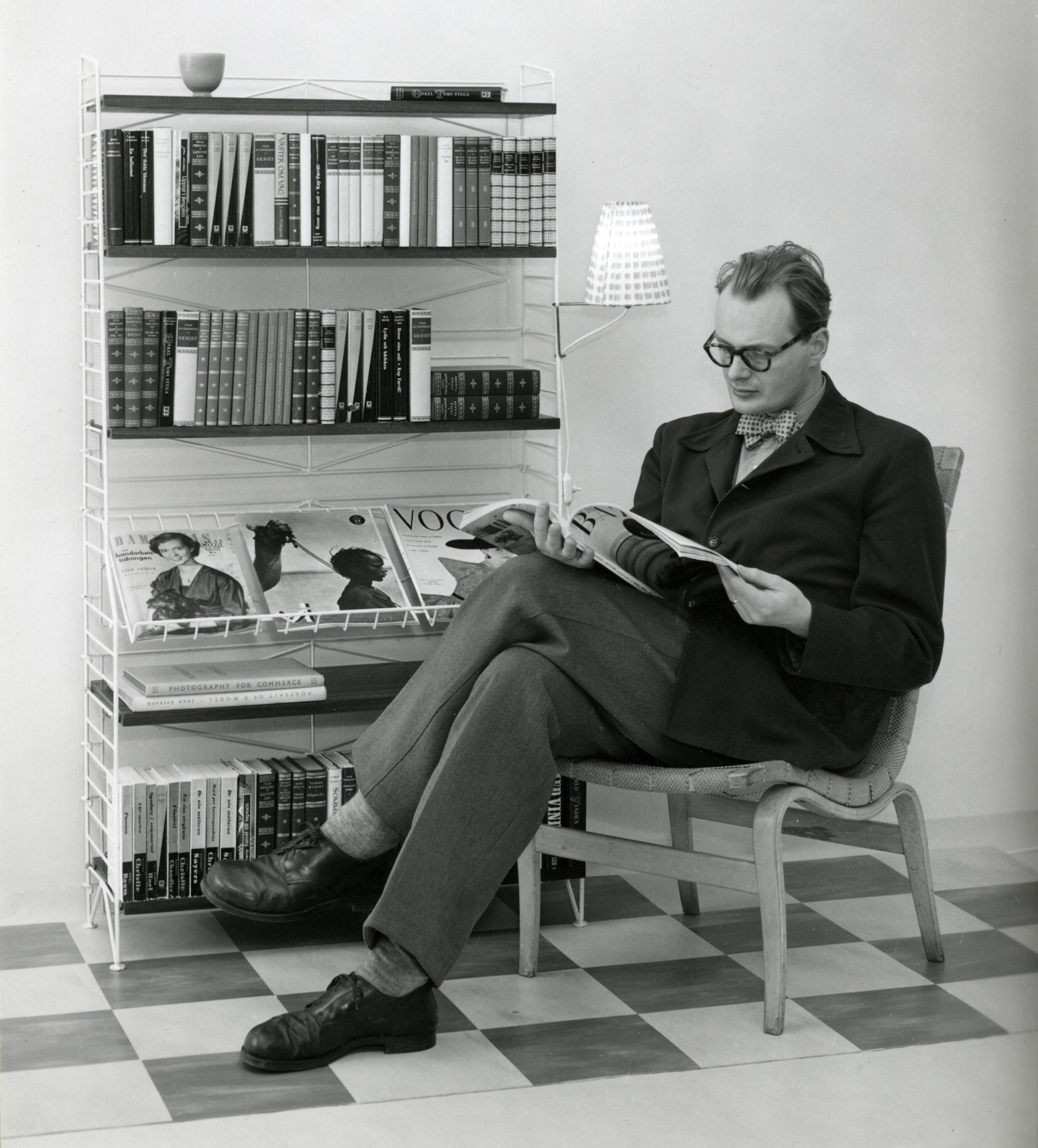

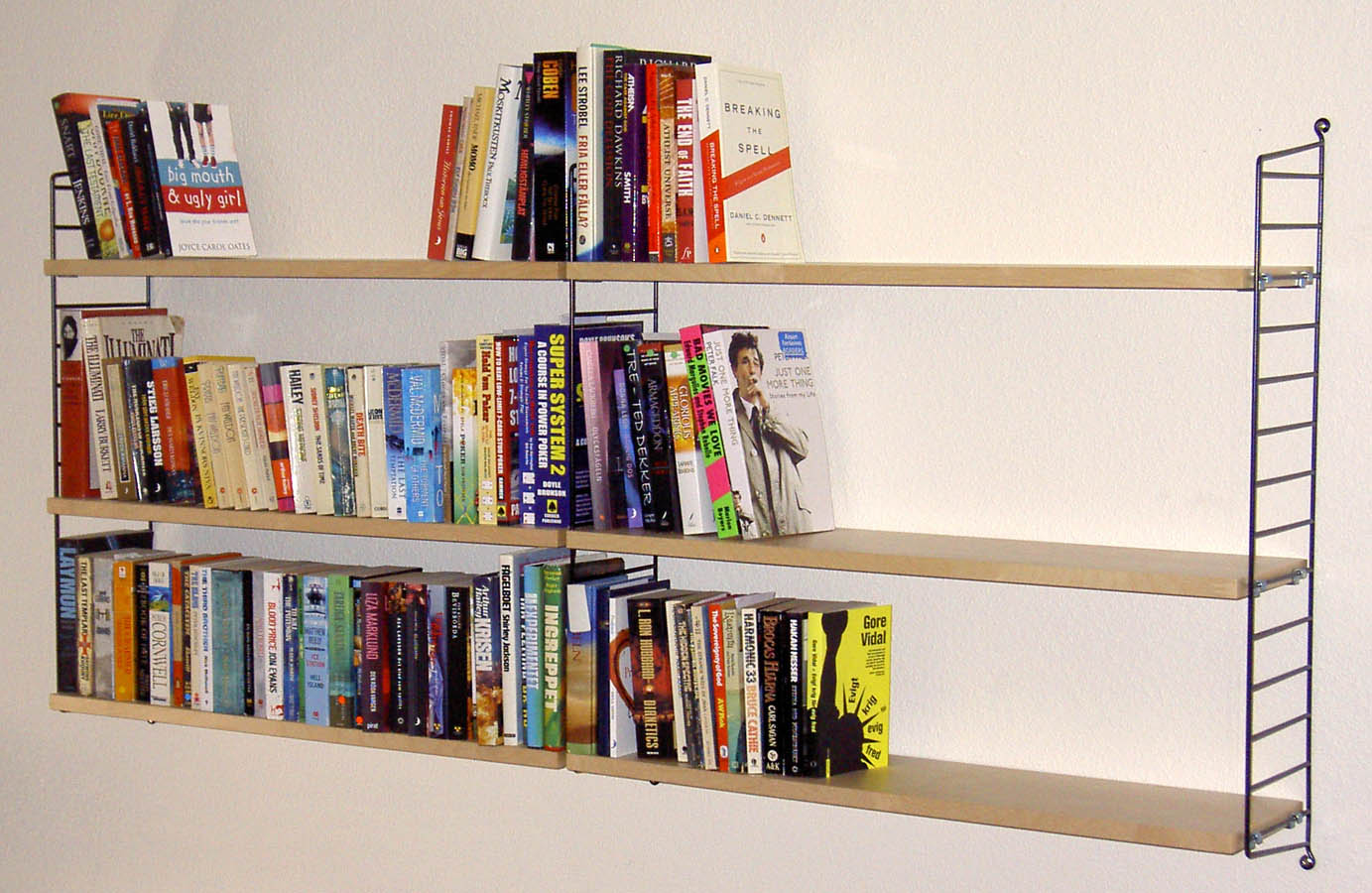
String bookshelf

Nils "Nisse" Strinning (8 December 1917 – 10 May 2006) was a Swedish architect and designer.

Strinning was born in Kramfors, and came from a Swedish family with origins in the 18th century in Ångermanland. The name was taken at the beginning of the 20th century by the family farm "Strinningen" north of Härnösand.

Nisse Strinning was best known for the String bookshelf system that he and his wife, the designer Kajsa Strinning, designed in 1949 for a contest initiated by Bonnier, a leading Swedish publisher.

In the 1940s, he studied architecture at the Royal Institute of Technology in Stockholm (KTH). Already as a student, he designed a dish rack which consisted of plastic coated metal wires. Dish rack, which was named elfa (not to be confused with electronics company ELFA), became very popular and was then starting when he and his wife created the famous String shelf.

In 1952 he founded the two companies String Design AB and Swedish Design AB. Together with his wife, he designed many plastic items in 1960—and 1970s. Nisse and Kajsa Strinning are rightly seen as an icons of Scandinavian Modern design and the String Shelving System as a modern contemporary design classic (see other article). Diversity of executions of the bookshelf may be seen in the catalogues.

== Awards and Exhibitions (extract) ==
1949: winner of Bonniers bookshelf competition.

1954: awarded gold medal, triennale, milan.

1954: exhibition “design in scandinavia”, usa.

1955: exhibition “h55”, helsingborg.

1993 & 1999: awarded excellent Swedish design by svensk form.

1999: nils strinning honored the classic award by svensk form.

2004–2006: exhibition “scandinavian design beyond the myth”; berlin, milano, gent, prag, budapest, riga, glasgow, copenhagen, gothenburg, oslo.

2005: exhibition ”h05/allrum”, helsingborg.

2006: exhibition ”h05/allrum” paris city hall.

2006: exhibition ”stars & stripes mixed with yellow & blue”, the Swedish embassy, Washington D.C. USA.
