= 1912 in architecture =

The year 1912 in architecture involved some significant architectural events and new buildings.

== Events ==
- Clough Williams-Ellis receives his first major architectural commission, for the remodelling of Llangoed Hall in Wales.

== Buildings and structures ==
=== Buildings opened ===
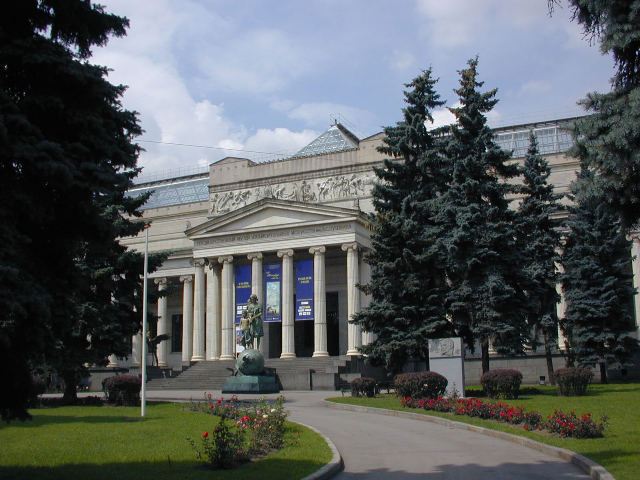
The Pushkin Museum of Fine Arts in Moscow, Russia

- Electric Tower, in Buffalo, New York, designed by Esenwein & Johnson
- April 19 – Bridges in Constantine, Algeria:
  - Sidi M'Cid Bridge, designed by Ferdinand Arnodin.
  - Sidi Rached Bridge, designed by Paul Séjourné.
- April 25 – Rebuilt St Mark's Campanile in Venice inaugurated.
- May – Pushkin Museum of Fine Arts opens in Moscow, Russia.
- June – Government Conference Centre, Ottawa, Ontario, Canada (opened by the Grand Trunk Railway as Ottawa's railway station)
- October 12 – Quarr Abbey on the Isle of Wight (England), designed by Dom Paul Bellot, consecrated.
- December 26 – Opening of:
  - Manchester Opera House, in Manchester, England, as the New Theatre, designed by Richardson & Gill with Farquarson.
  - St. James Theatre, Wellington, New Zealand, designed by Henry Eli White.

=== Buildings completed ===
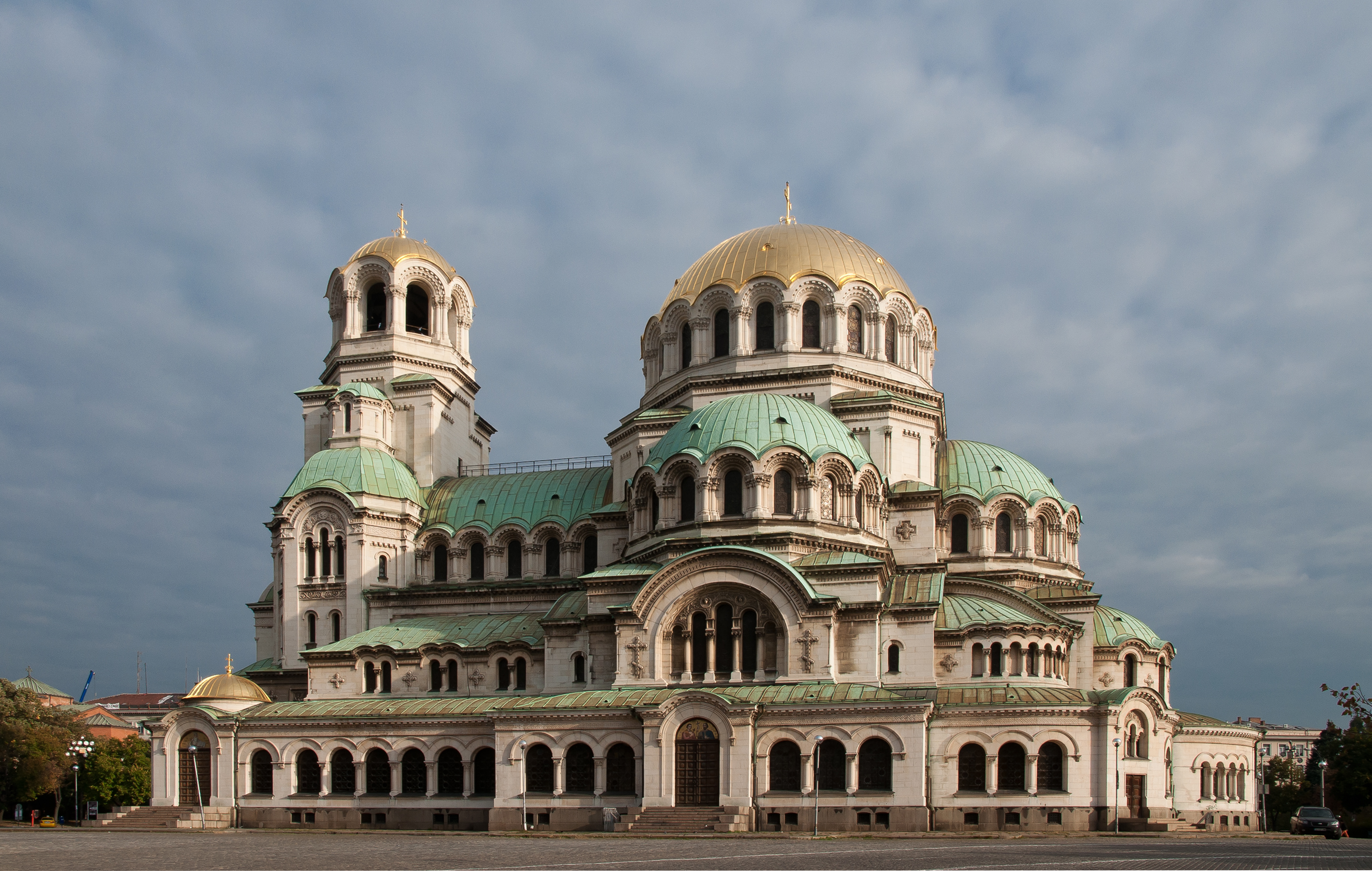
Alexander Nevsky Cathedral, Sofia, Bulgaria

- Alexander Nevsky Cathedral, Sofia, Bulgaria.
- Mysore Palace, India, designed by Henry Irwin.
- El Centro Español de Tampa, Florida, USA.
- Mawson's Huts, Cape Denison, Commonwealth Bay, Australian Antarctic Territory
- Šaloun's Villa in Prague, designed by and for sculptor Ladislav Šaloun.
- The Salutation, Sandwich, Kent, England, designed by Edwin Lutyens with garden by Gertrude Jekyll.
- Sons of Norway Hall, Petersburg, Alaska, USA.
- Glamorgan County Hall, Cardiff, Wales, designed by Vincent Harris and T. A. Moodie.
- Chengyang Bridge, China.
- Jackson Tower in Portland, Oregon
- The Fairmont Copley Plaza Hotel in Boston, Massachusetts
- Sun Tower in Vancouver, British Columbia, Canada
- Montreal Museum of Fine Arts in Montreal, Quebec, Canada
- Ritz-Carlton Montreal in Montreal, Quebec, Canada

== Awards ==
- Olympic gold medal – Eugène Monod & Alphone Laverrière of Switzerland for Building plan of a modern stadium.
- RIBA Royal Gold Medal – Basil Champneys.
- Grand Prix de Rome, architecture: Jacques Debat-Ponsan.

== Births ==
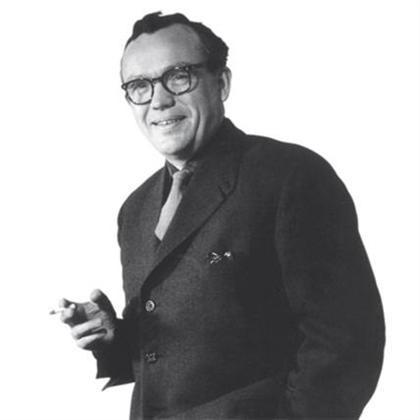
Finn Juhl

- January 9 – Ralph Tubbs, British architect associated with the Festival of Britain (died 1996)
- January 30 – Finn Juhl, Danish architect, interior and industrial designer (died 1989)
- February 21 – Henry Bernard, French architect, designer of the Palace of Europe (died 1994)
- March 12 – Gordon Tait, British architect (died 1999)
- June 11 – Rosemary Stjernstedt, British architect (died 1998)
- June 30 – María Luisa Dehesa Gómez Farías, Mexican architect (died 2009)
- December 1 – Minoru Yamasaki, American World Trade Center architect (died 1986)
- December 15 – Ray Eames, American industrial designer, 2nd wife of Charles Eames (died 1988)

== Deaths ==
- February 8 – Constant-Désiré Despradelle, French architect and professor of architecture (born 1862)
- June 1 – Daniel Burnham, American architect and urban planner (born 1846)
- June 27 – Frank Furness, Philadelphia-based American architect (born 1839)
- November 17 – Richard Norman Shaw, British architect (born 1831)
