= František Bílek =

Czech architect, graphic and sculptor

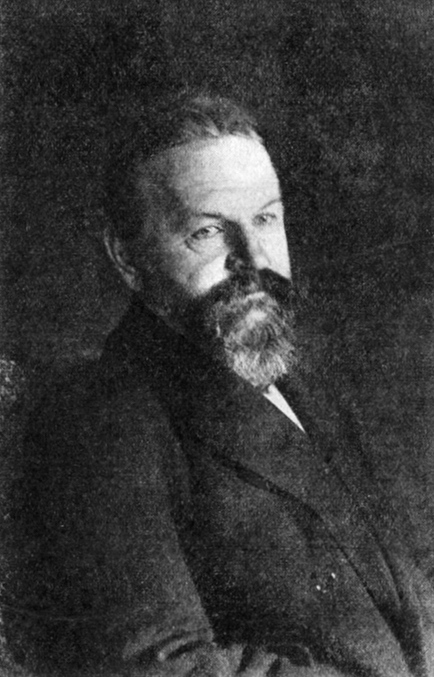
František Bílek, before 1931

František Bílek (6 November 1872, Chýnov – 13 October 1941, Chýnov) was a Czech sculptor and architect, in the Art Nouveau and Symbolist styles.

== Biography ==
His father was a wheelwright. He graduated from primary school in Tábor, then went to study painting with Professor Maxmilián Pirner at the Academy of Fine Arts Prague. As it turned out, he was color blind so, on the advice of his teachers, he transferred to the State Industrial School, where he studied sculpture with Josef Mauder. His younger brother, Antonín, would also become a sculptor.

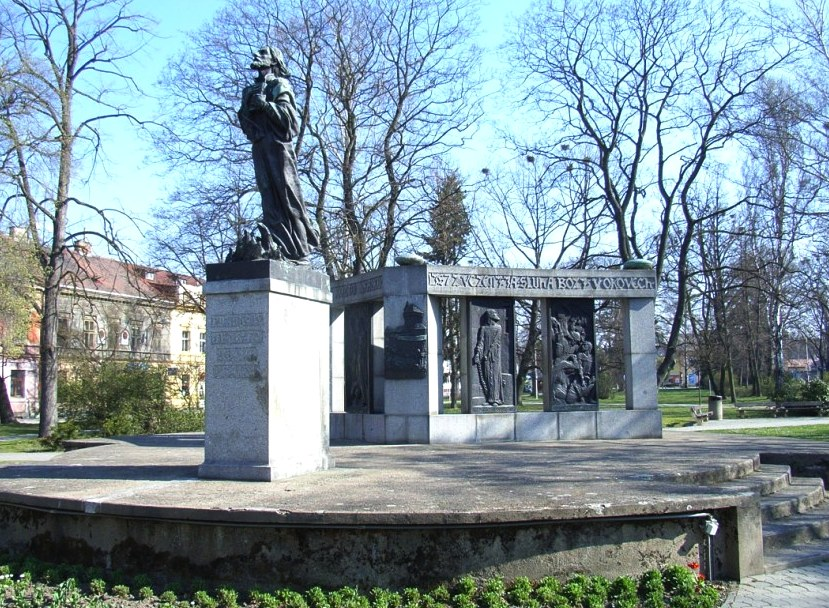
Monument to Jan Hus, Tábor

In 1891, he received a scholarship from a patron, the businessman Vojtěch Lanna, which enabled him to study in Paris at the Académie Colarossi, with Jean Antoine Injalbert. He soon became part of a group of Czech artists living there, including Alfons Mucha. His initial works were inspired by his religious feelings. They included a "Golgotha, Mountain of Skulls", and one titled "Plowing is Our Penalty for Guilt". These were not well received by the scholarship commission in Prague, headed by Josef Václav Myslbek, who said the scholarship had been wasted. His patron, Lanna, was also displeased and withdrew his funding.

After completing a year of military service, he returned to Chýnov in 1893 and set up his own workshop. In 1898, he built a home, of his own design, which included a larger studio. He worked alone, belonging to no associations or commissions. In 1902 he married Berta Nečasová and, shortly after, moved to Prague. There, he became a member of the Mánes Union of Fine Arts. When the old city walls were demolished, he bought some land in the Hradčany district where, in 1911, he designed and built the Villa Bílek; set freely in a natural environment.

His relationship to Catholicism, though deep, had always been fraught with disagreements. In 1921, he and his family converted to the Czechoslovak Hussite Church. Over the following years, he designed numerous ceremonial objects and small sculptures for various congregations. In 1928, he created a monument to Jan Hus in Tábor.

In the early 1930s, his health went into a serious decline. Following the German occupation of Prague, he and his family returned to Chýnov. He is buried in the local cemetery, with one of his own statues ("Prayer Over the Graves", 1905) serving as a monument.

In his will, he expressed the wish that his villa be used for a museum. In 1963, his widow Berta made a formal donation of the property. Today, there is a permanent exhibition operated by the Gallery of the Capital City. The family home in Chýnov was donated by his granddaughter, Alena, and has also been devoted to his works. The façade is decorated with his reliefs, accompanied by mystical texts.

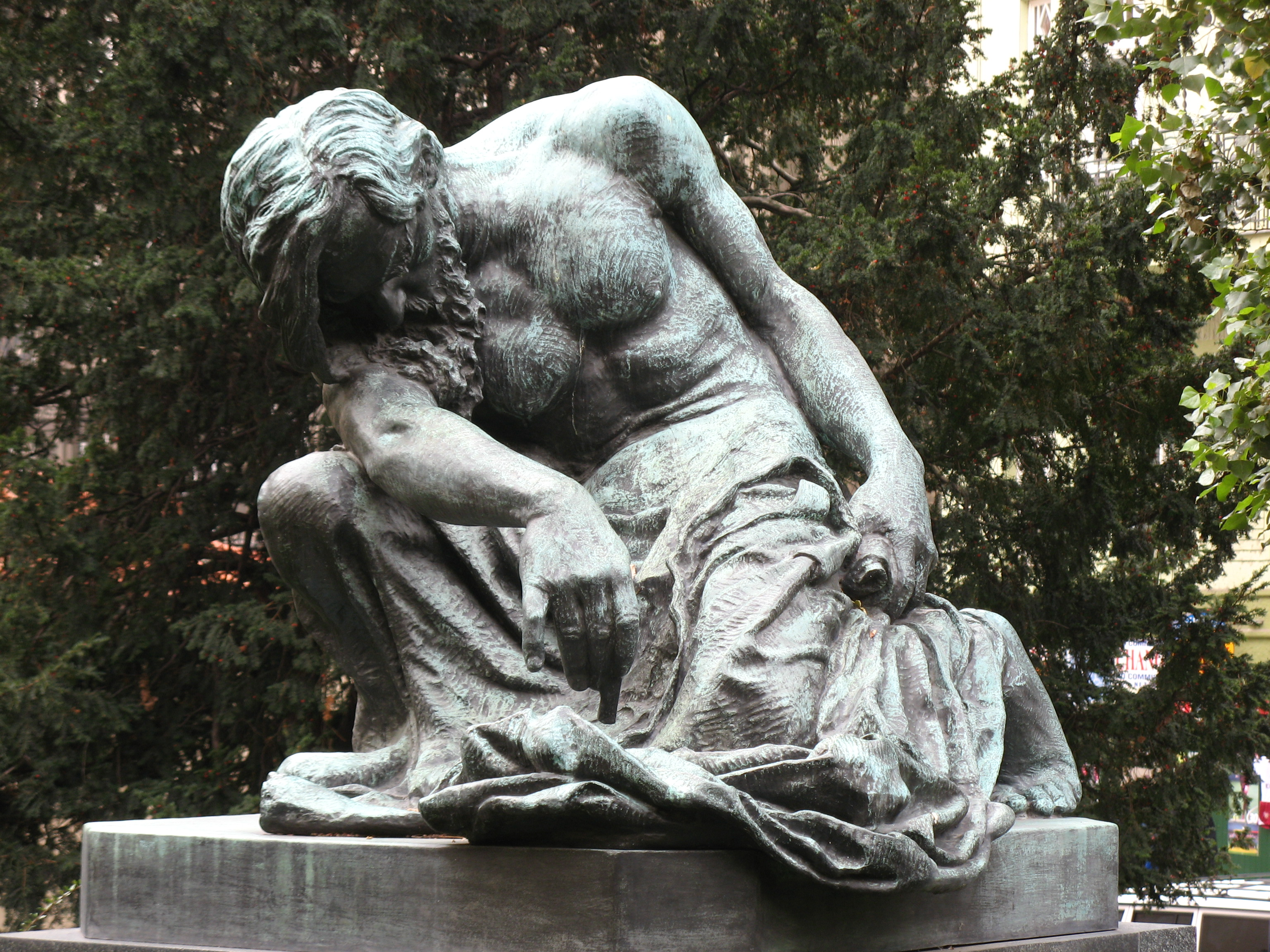
Moses (1905) in Prague
