= Písek Gate =

- Písecká brána(in Czech)
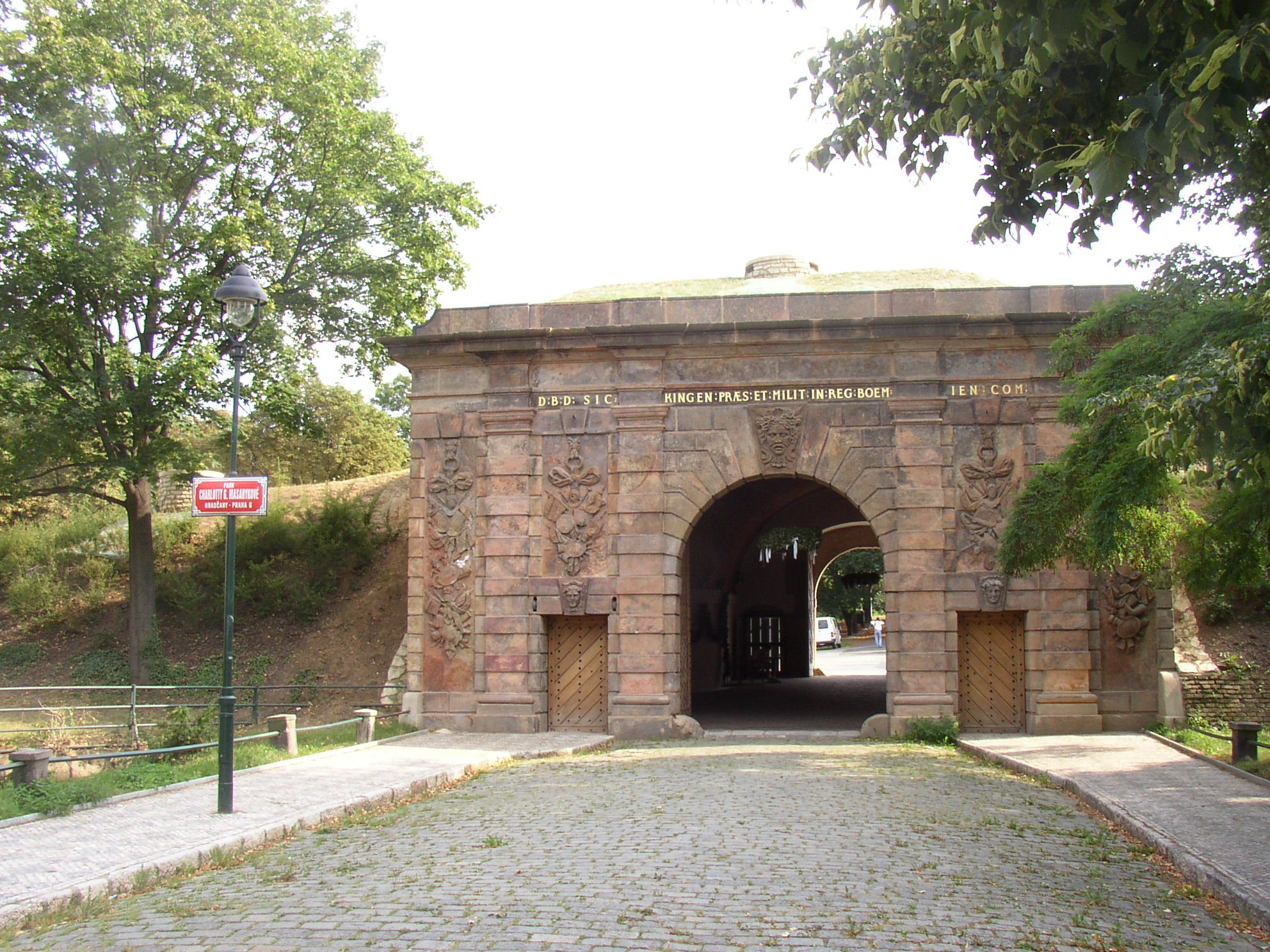
- Outer side of the gate with decoration advertising military strength of the Habsburg monarchy
- Interactive map of the Písek Gate area
- Alternative names: Bruska Gate

General information
- Type: city gate
- Architectural style: Baroque
- Location: Prague-Hradčany, Czech Republic
- Coordinates: 50°05′42″N 14°24′20″E
- Completed: 1721

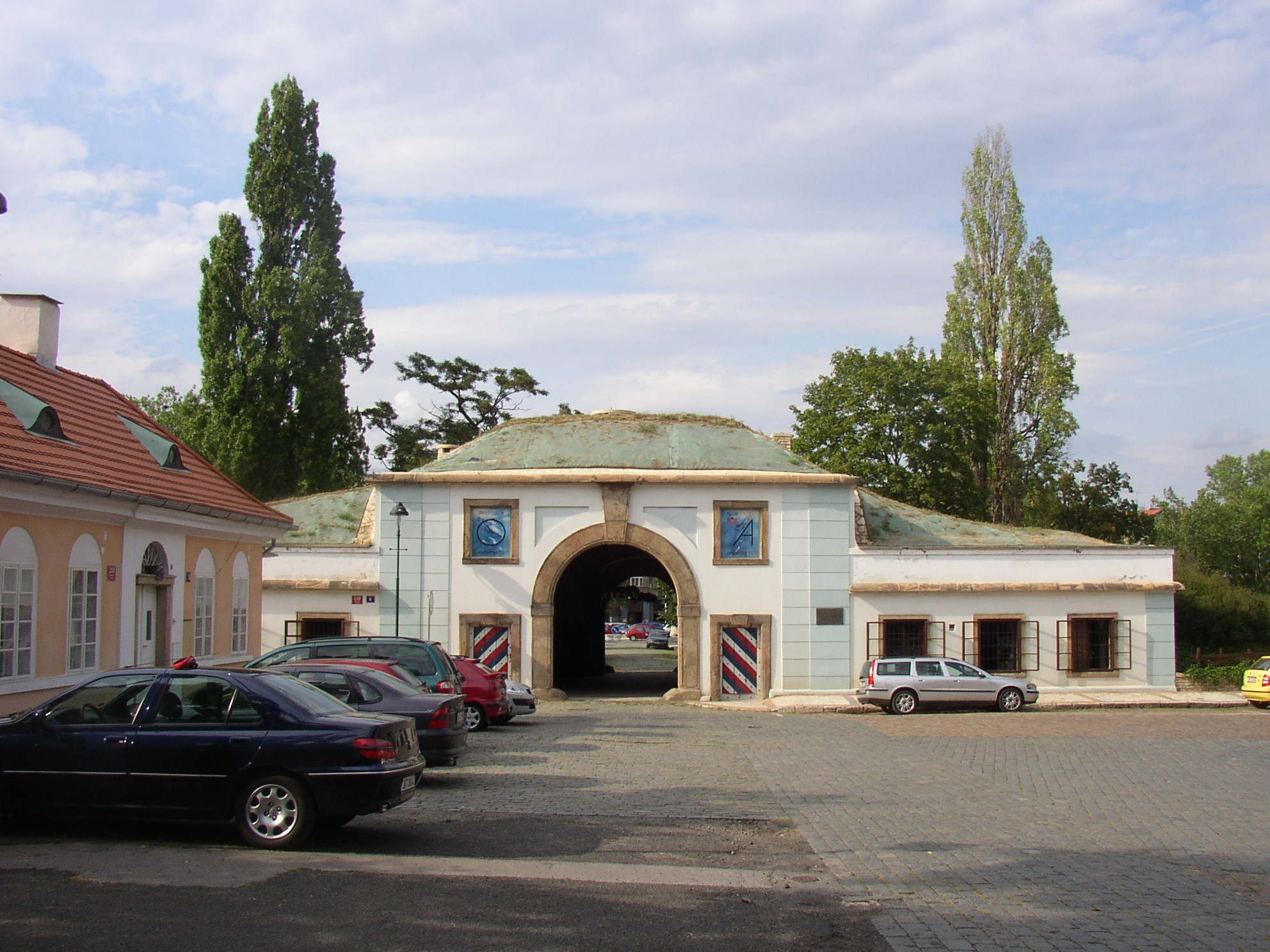
The inner side of the gate offers a more friendly face

Písek Gate (Czech: Písecká brána), also called Bruska Gate (Czech: Bruská brána) is a former city gate of Baroque fortification of Prague, Czech Republic. Once belonging to the fortification section called Marian Walls (Czech: Mariánské hradby) it is located in K Brusce Street in the Hradčany neighbourhood, not far from Hradčanská metro station. Other sights in the vicinity include Royal Summer Palace or Villa Bílek. Nowadays Písek Gate is the only preserved gate of the city proper and one of four remaining of the whole fortification system (Tábor, Leopold and Chotek (Brick) gates are part of Vyšehrad Fortress).

The name has nothing in common with town of Písek in Southern Bohemia but it derives from a previous medieval gate which used to stand several hundred steps away, at Písek, a defunct suburb of Lesser Quarter (located approximately where Valdštejnská Street is today). This suburb together with the old gate was demolished in the 1620s in order to make space for then newly built Wallenstein Palace. The alternative name derives from the Brusnice (Bruska) stream, a tiny tributary of the Vltava River running along northern side of Prague Castle.

The gate was situated between bastions of St George and St Ludmilla. It was built as one of latest parts of Baroque fortification in 1721 by architect Giovanni Battista Alliprandi after a design by František Vogot. Písek Gate serving northbound traffic was one of three city gates in the left bank part of Prague (the other were westbound Imperial Gate (Czech: Říšská brána) located in what is now Dlabačov Street and southbound Újezd Gate (Czech: Újezdská brána) in Újezd Street). During the War of the Austrian Succession in 1741 understaffed and weakly defended Písek Gate was where troops of Charles Albert, Elector of Bavaria and claimant to the throne of Bohemia, entered Prague. After the Austro-Prussian War of 1866 it was decided that fortified cities were no longer necessary and the fortification ring of Prague started to be gradually dismantled. The Marian Walls survived until the turn of the 20th century when only fractions, including Písek Gate, were left. Thanks to a new road bypassing it, the gate was no longer considered an obstacle for growing traffic and remained standing. In 2000 - 2002 Písek Gate underwent restoration and was turned into a café and gallery; wedding ceremonies are held there as well.
