= Marian column (Prague) =

Column in Prague, Czech Republic

Coordinates: 50°5′14.28″N 14°25′16.50″E

- Mariánský sloup (Czech)
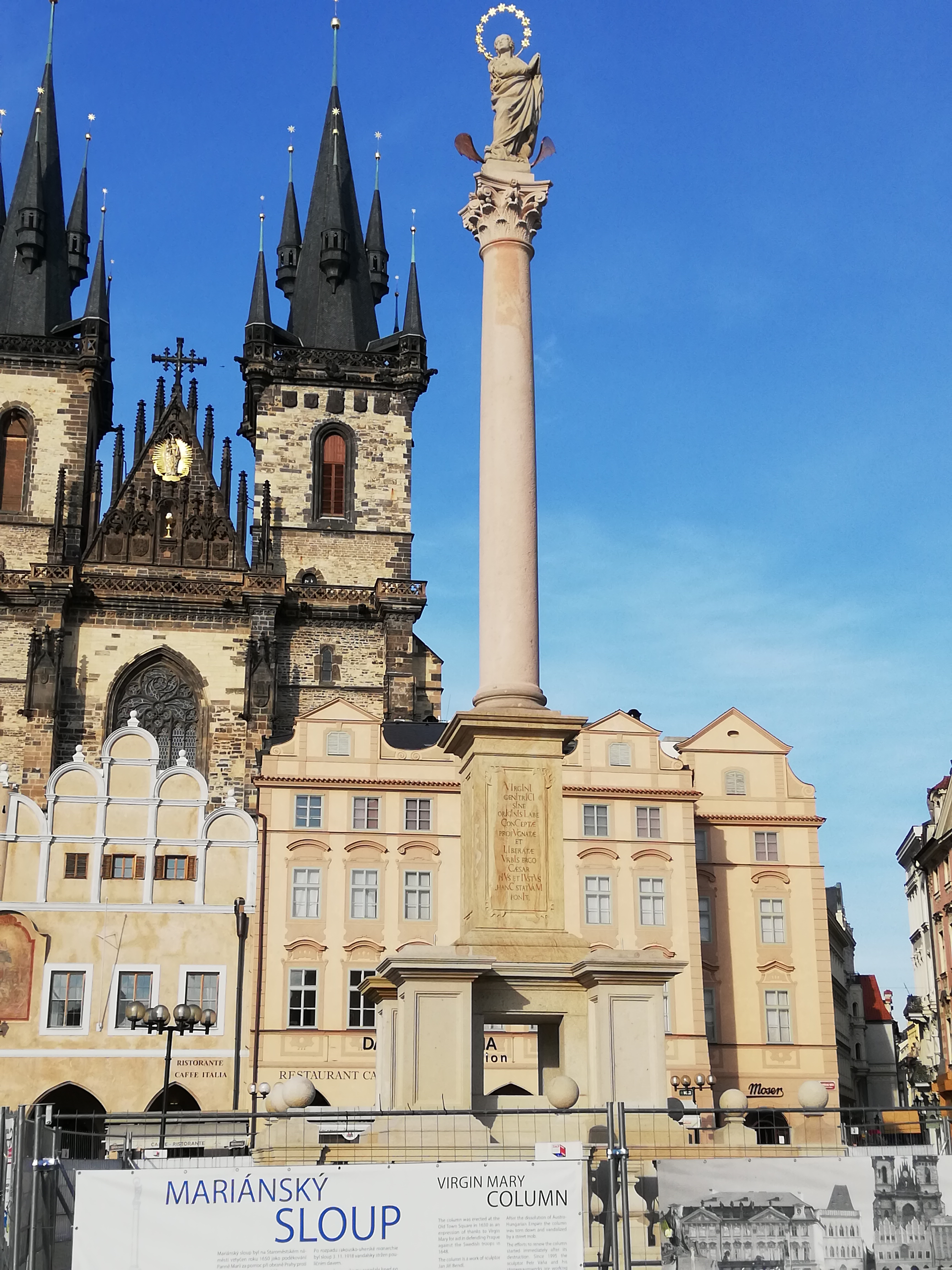
- The reerected Marian column on Old Town Square

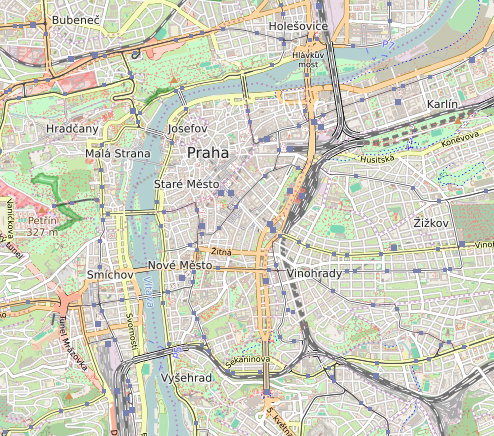
- Location in Prague
- Artist: Johann Georg Bendl
- Year: 1650 - 1918, 2020
- Location: Prague, Czech Republic

The Marian column (Czech: Mariánský sloup) of Prague is a religious monument consisting of a column topped with a statue of the Virgin Mary, located in the city's Old Town Square. The original column was erected in 1650, shortly after the conclusion of the Thirty Years' War. It was demolished in November 1918, coinciding with the fall of Austria-Hungary. In 2020, the column was reconstructed, being completed on 15 August 2020.

== History ==
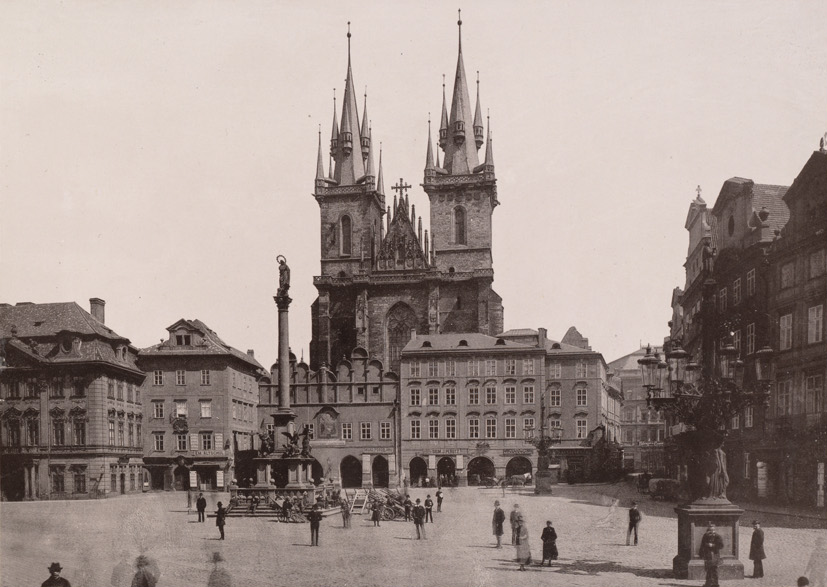
The original Marian column in 1894

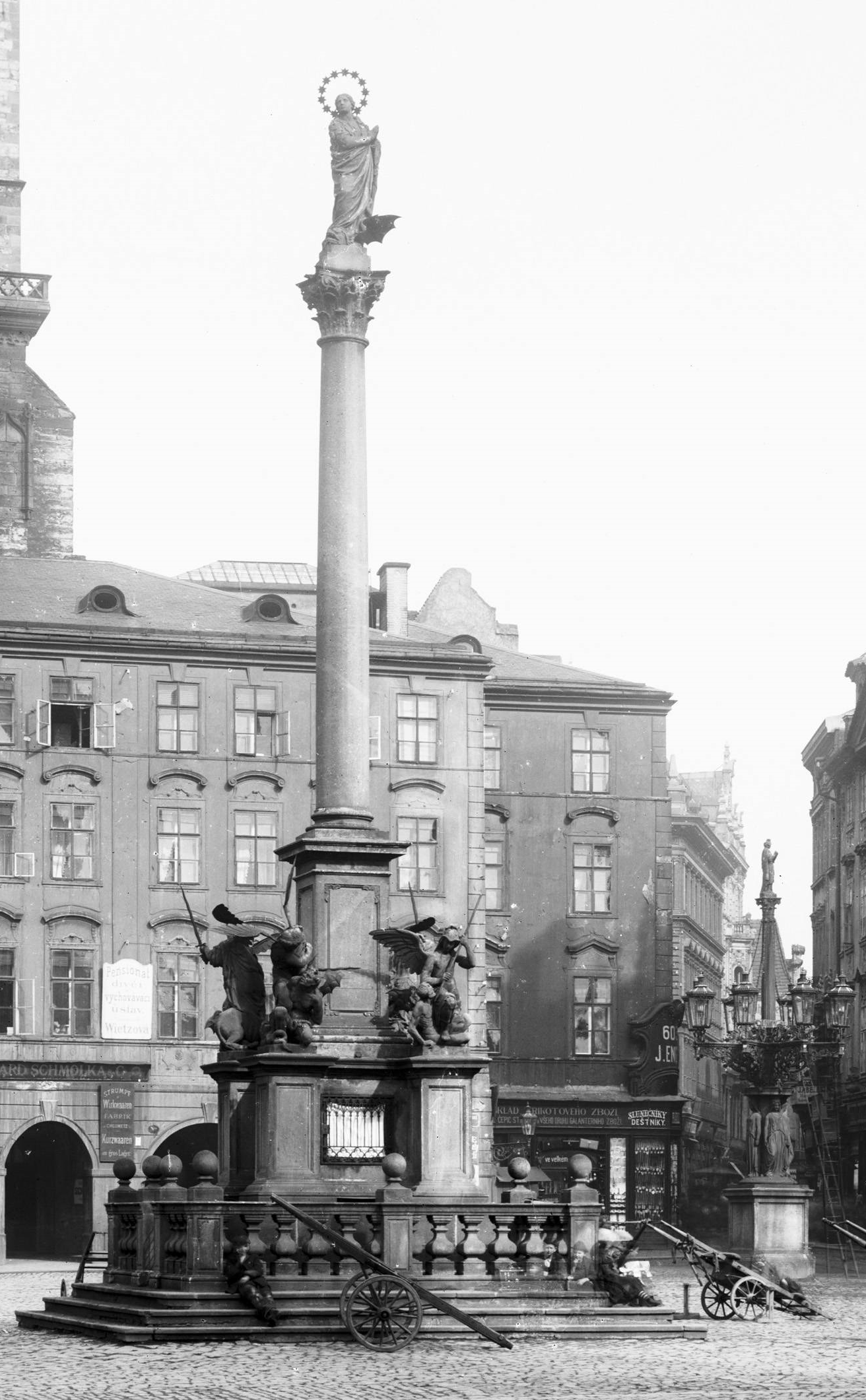
The original Marian column in 1900

Prague's Marian column was built in the Old Town Square in 1650 as a thanks for the city's role in the Battle of Prague in 1648, which resulted in a Bohemian victory over the Swedish Empire. The column was sculpted by Johann Georg Bendl. It was the fourth oldest Marian column in Europe, following Rome (1614), Munich (1638) and Vienna (1647).

The column was almost 16 meters high and bore a two-meter gilded statue of Virgin Mary. At the base of the column was a hollow space that served as a chapel. Inside there was a Gothic panel with the image of the "Virgin Mary of the Square" (Panna Marie Rynecká), dating from the beginning of the 15th century. In the corners of the column stood four statues of angels symbolizing the four cardinal virtues fighting the forces of evil. The first angel struck down the devil with a spear and represented wisdom, the second defeated a lion with a two-handed sword and represented righteousness, the third fought a dragon and represented bravery, and the fourth angel defeated the devil with the cross and expressed gentleness.

During the Prussian siege in 1757, the southwest corner sculpture was damaged by a cannonball during the shelling of Prague. It was not until 1858 that it was replaced by a copy from the Prague sculptor Josef Böhm.

== Destruction ==
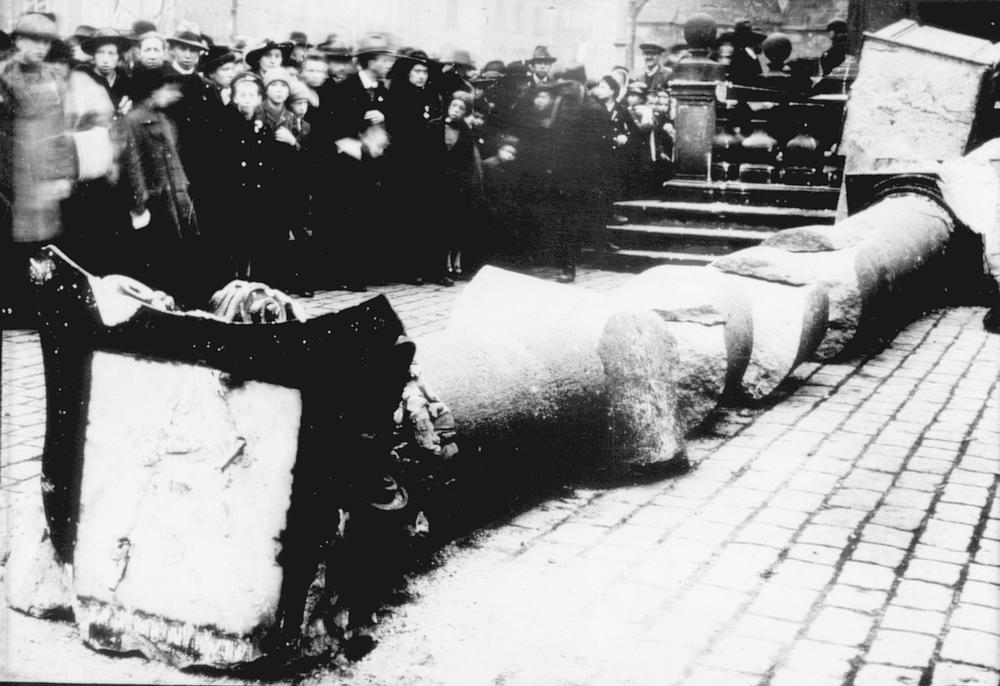
The Marian column following its toppling

In 1915, the Jan Hus Memorial, sculpted by Ladislav Šaloun, was erected in the square. Hus was the founder of the Hussites, a pre-Protestant religious reform movement, who was executed by the Catholic Church for heresy. The construction of this memorial was considered to show the shifting attitudes of Prague, which increasing shifted away from the Catholic Church.

In autumn of 1918, the Austro-Hungarian Empire was close to defeat and about to be dismantled and Czechoslovakia declared independent. In this context, on 3 November 1918, the column, considered a symbol of the monarchy and Catholicism, was torn down.

The Czechoslovak official press accepted the demolition of the column with understanding, but most of the important political figures of the First Republic did not publicly support its destruction, though they expressed understanding in private. Tomáš Garrigue Masaryk, who learned about the demolition of the column in England, stated that "when the people of Prague removed the statue, I was glad because the statue was a political disgrace for us".

The remaining parts of the column were removed on the night of 18–19 December 1918 and taken to the courtyard of the Church of St. Anna in the Old Town. Fragments of the statue of the Virgin Mary, the four sculptures with angels, and the stone railings were stored in the Prague Lapidarium at Výstaviště Praha. The broken head of the Virgin Mary was found in 1957 in an antique shop on Národní třída. It was bought by the National Museum and also placed in the lapidarium. An almost identical statue of the Virgin Mary by Bendel, created in 1673, is located on the Marian Column in Louny.

== Disputes and preparation ==
In 1990, a private Catholic church affiliate association for restoring of Marian column was founded in Prague. Beginning in 1995, a group of Czech artists, started work on restoring the Marian column. In 2000, Petr Váňa was asked to sculpt a replica of the head of statue of the Virgin Mary. This part of the work was completed in 2002 and installed in the southern yard of the Church of Our Lady before Týn (Chrám Matky Boží před Týnem) in Prague. Petr Vána, with his brother and an assistant, continued the work. They brought a sandstone column from India and cut other parts of group.

The reconstruction of the column was rejected several times, most recently in September 2017, when city councillors suggested that it divided the people of Prague, rather than reconciling them. Opponents see the column as a symbol of post-White Mountain oppression by the Catholic Habsburg rulers. According to Prague's Mayor, Zdeněk Hřib, it represents "the promotion of one idea at the expense of another. Consequently, in principle [the column] cannot be taken in this context as a symbol of reconciliation within the framework of ecumenical harmony". According to the mayor, the column symbolizes the defeat of the idea of tolerance, which is still relevant today.

Before the expiry of the building permit on 29 May 2019, the contractor tried to start the construction by uncovering the foundations of the original column. However, he did not have permission to occupy the space needed for the arrival of construction equipment. The area was then barred by a city police van and the contractor had to restore the site to its previous state. A few days later, 26 Czech art historians published a call not to allow the city authorities to renew the column.

In January 2020, however, the reconstruction of the column was approved by the Prague City Council in a new term, revoking the previous term Council's resolution.

== Reconstruction ==
Work on re-erecting the column started on 15 February 2020. Major work was completed on 4 June 2020, with final completion of the column celebrated on 15 August 2020. On that date, the column became city property.

The purpose of the reconstruction was to make a most faithful reproduction of the original statue of the Virgin Mary. A copy was created from the preserved torso of the original. The missing left part of the statue with folded hands was reconstructed according to a similar statue on the main square of Louny and relevant photographs. So-called Božanovský sandstone from Teplice nad Metují was chosen for the copy of the statue, while the column with the Corinthian head was made of sandstone originating in India. The pedestal is made of Pietra Dorata sandstone from Siena and was dedicated by the Italian town of Vitorchiano. The sanctuary is made of Mrákotín Granite. The four pedestals for the statues of angels were dedicated by the four orders: the Knights of Malta, the Teutonic Order, the Knights of the Cross with the Red Star and the Order of Saint Lazarus. However, it is not yet clear whether the statues of angels will be installed. It was reported in 2017 that the creators will complete them later. The remaining architecture was reconstructed according to the preserved parts.

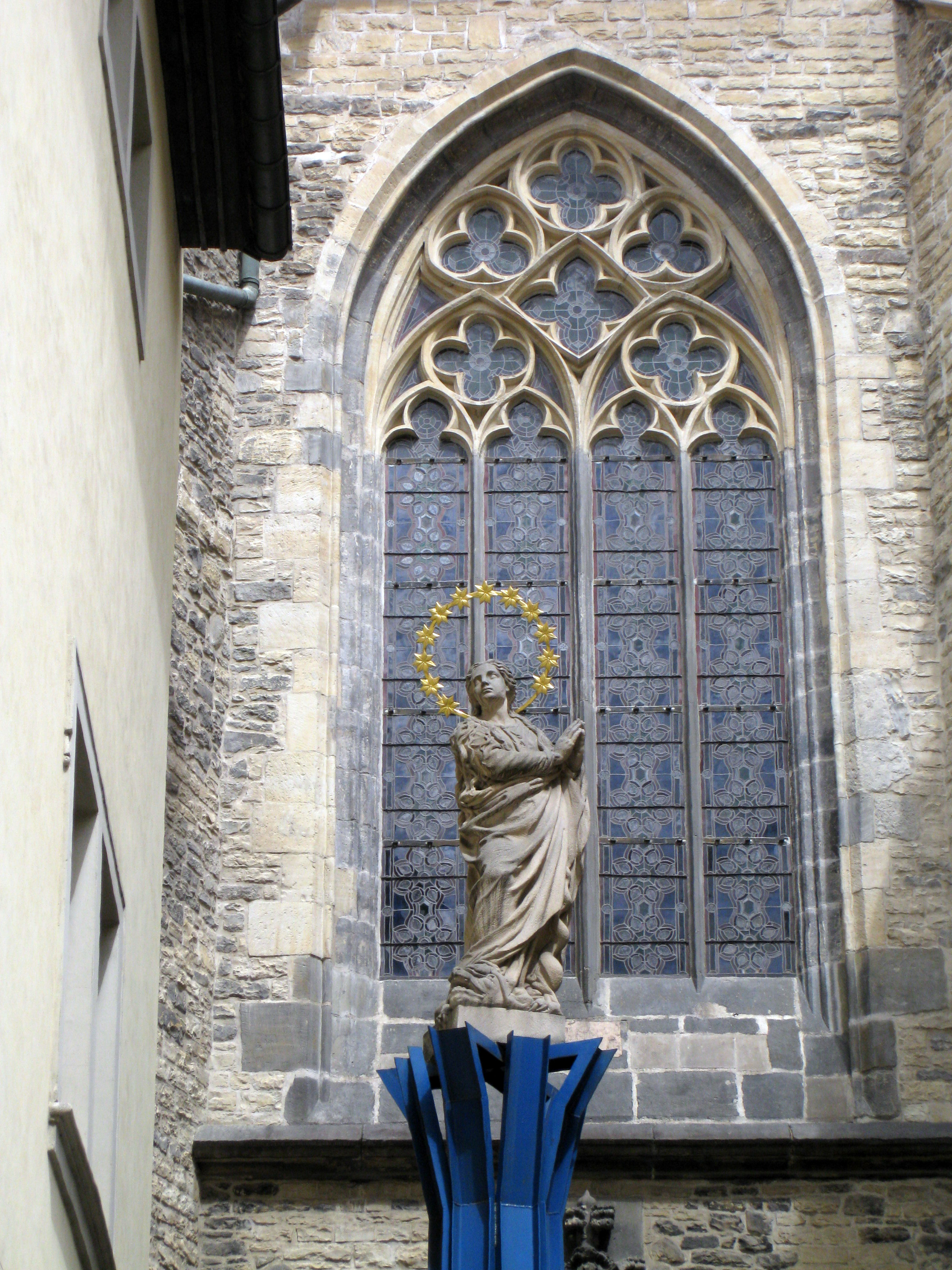
Copy of the statue of the Virgin Mary by Peter Vana

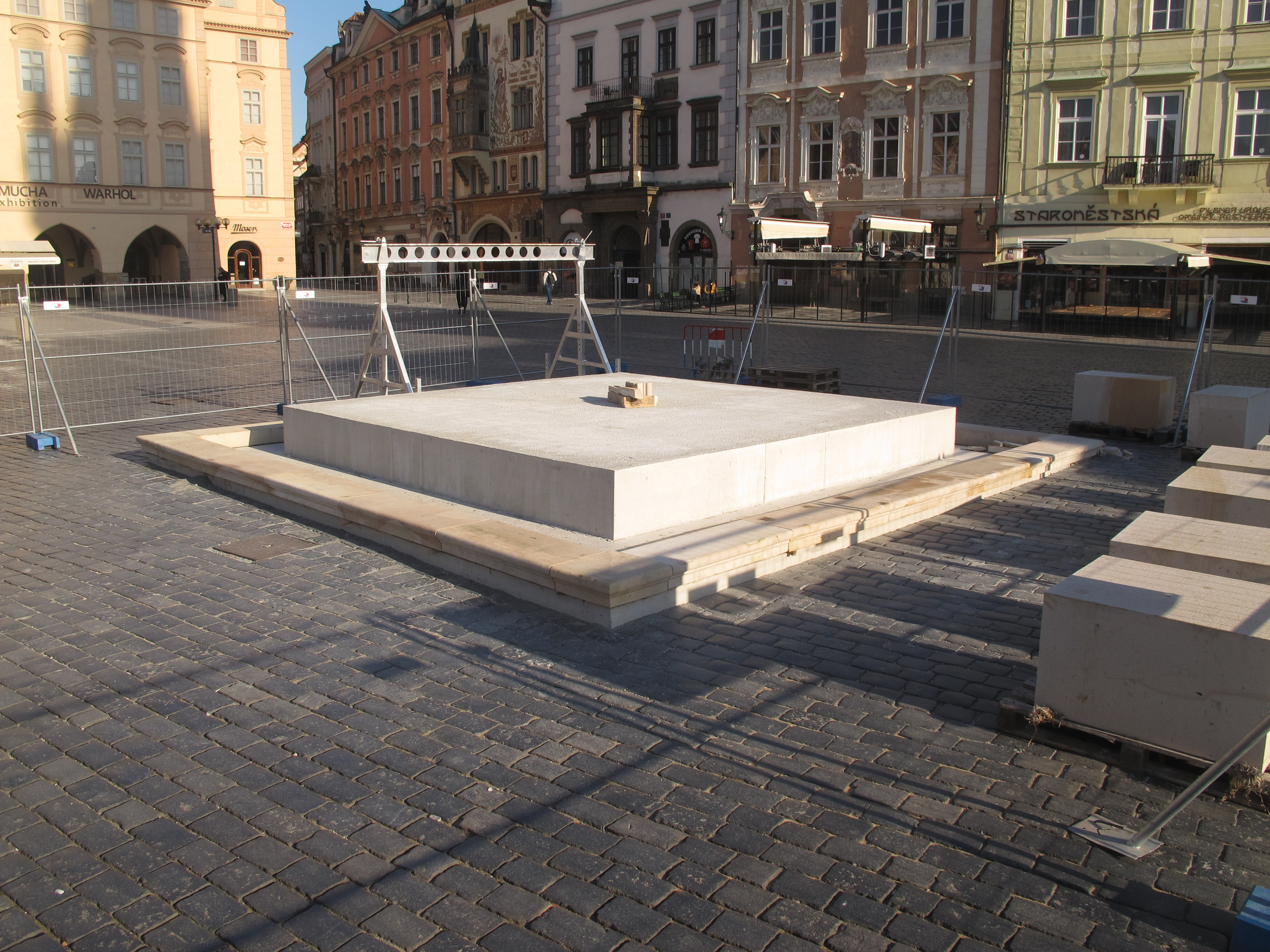
Pediment of the reconstructed column, March 2020

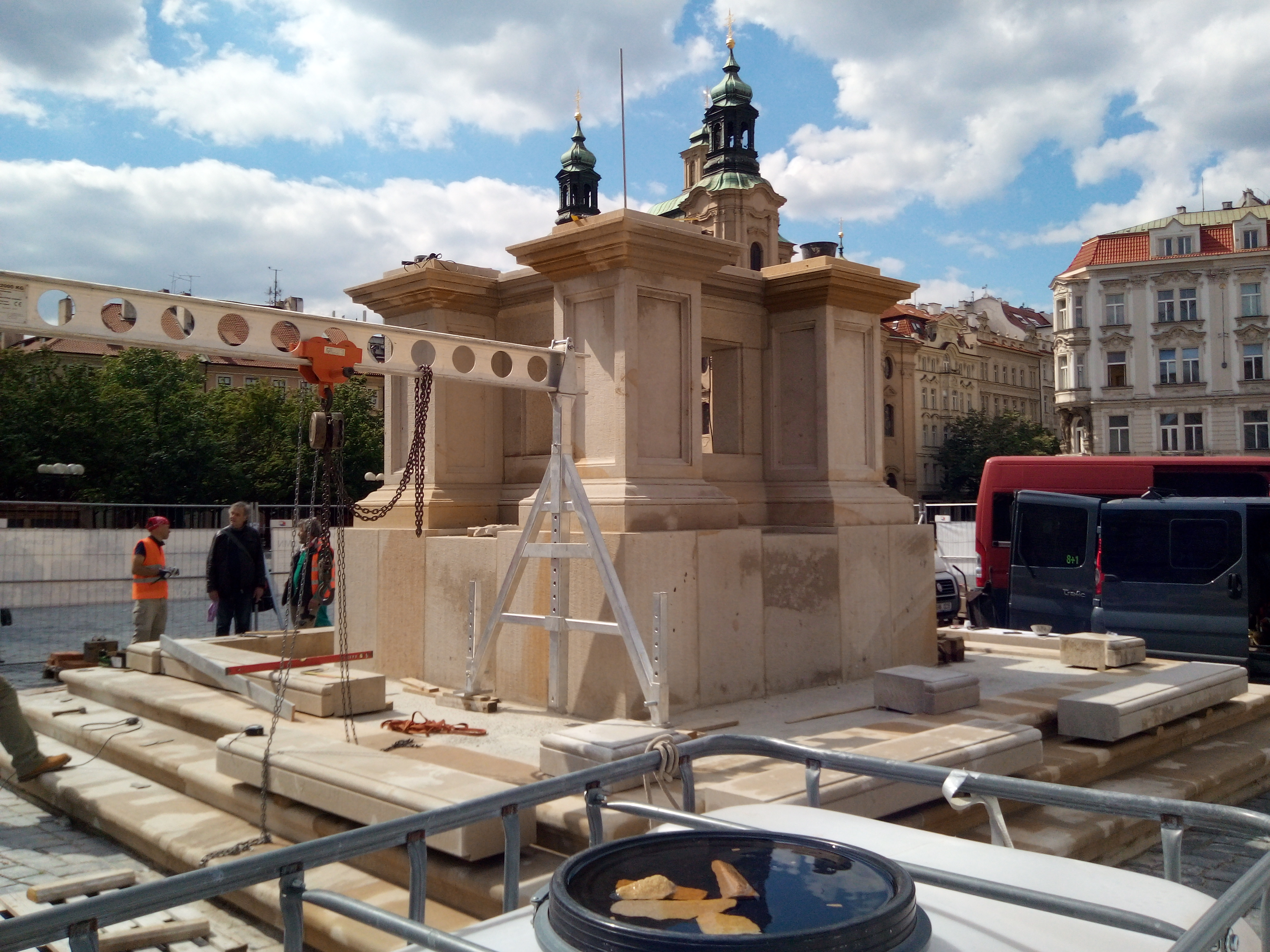
May 2020

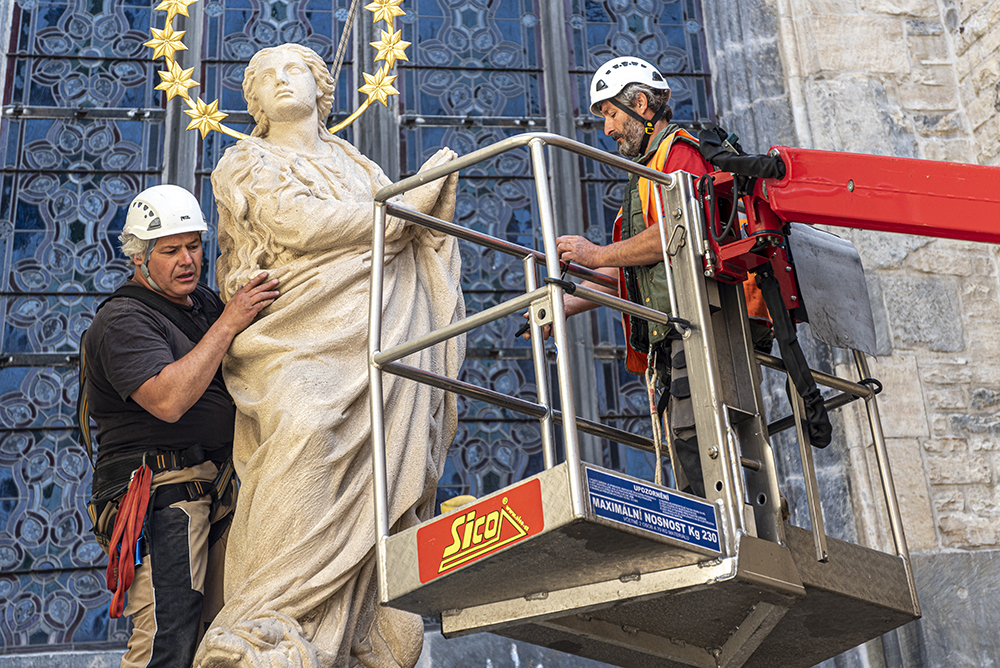
Capture a copy of the statue of the Virgin Mary from its temporary location next to Church of Our Lady before Týn (Chrám Matky Boží před Týnem), June 4, 2020

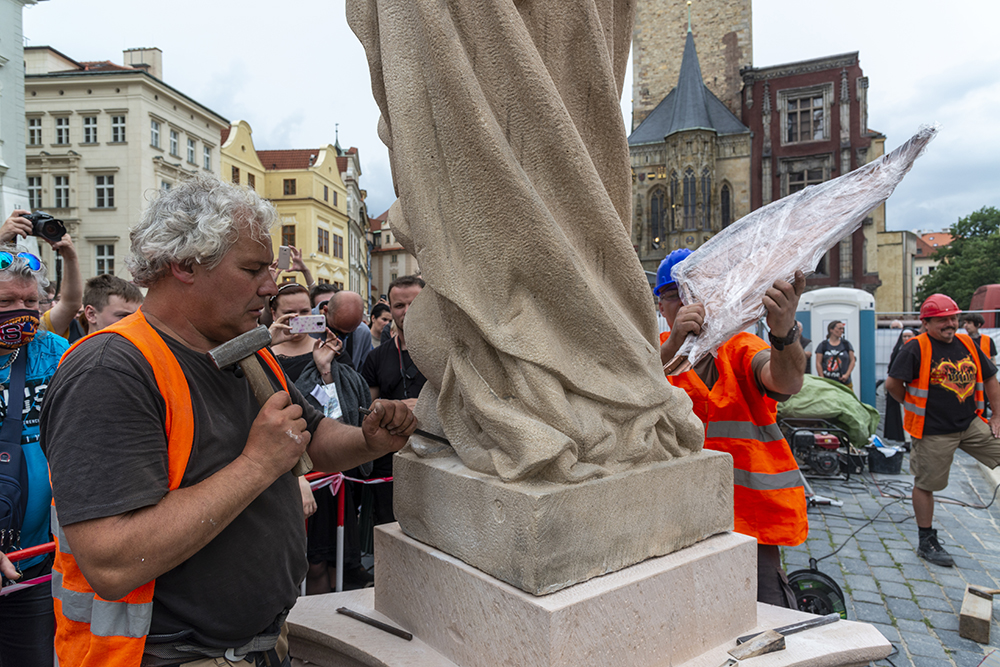
Last modifications of the statue before the final placement, June 4, 2020

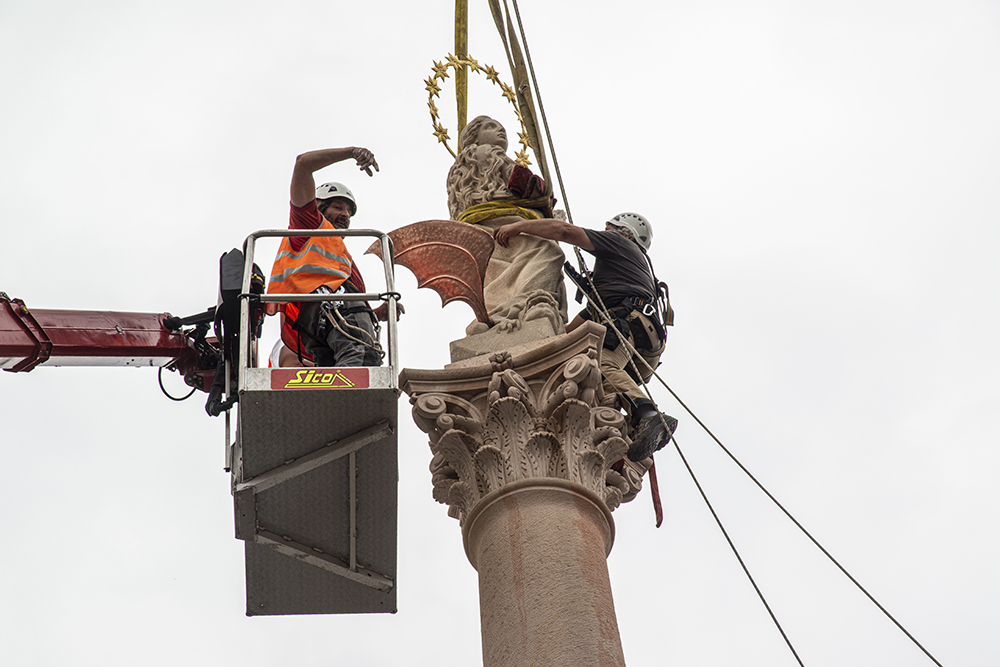
Sculptor Petr Váňa places the statue of the Virgin Mary on top of a replica of the Marian Column, June 4, 2020
