= Villa Bílek =

House in Prague, Czech Republic

- Bílkova vila (in Czech)
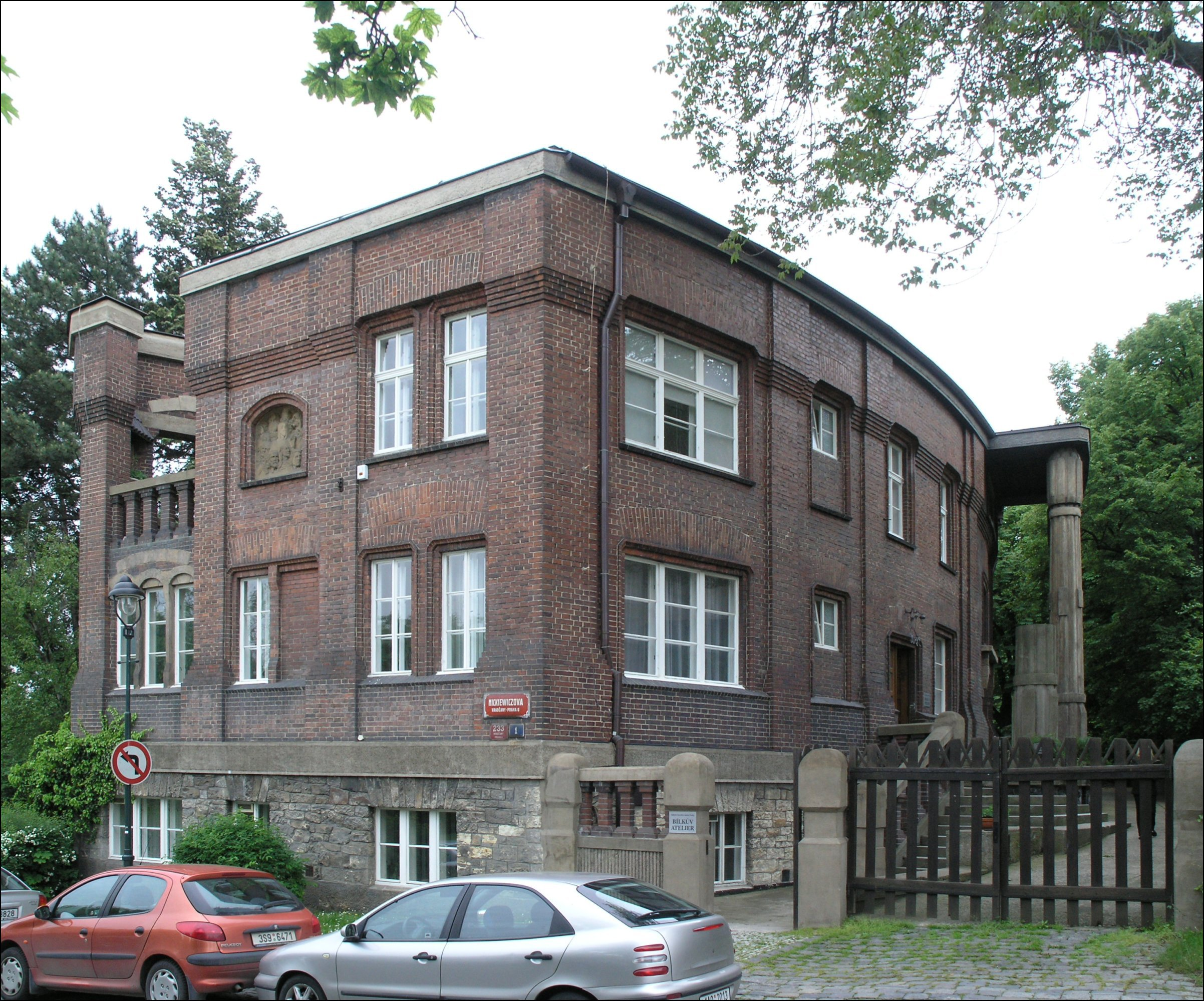
- Interactive map of the Villa Bílek area

General information
- Architectural style: Art Nouveau, Symbolism
- Location: Prague-Hradčany, Czech Republic
- Coordinates: 50°05′42″N 14°24′30″E

Design and construction
- Architect: František Bílek

The Villa Bílek (Czech: Bílkova vila) is a house designed by the Czech sculptor and architect František Bílek in 1911. The villa is located in Hradčany neighbourhood of Prague, Czech Republic, several minutes walk from Hradčanská metro station or Prague Castle. It was designed originally for Bílek himself as his residence and studio.

Located on site of the former city walls (see preserved Písek Gate nearby), the villa has an unusual shape, resembling the trail of a scythe in a field. The brickwork masonry is articulated by pillars in the form of corn sheaves, evoking Egyptian architecture. Through this building, Bílek, a deeply religious artist, aimed to express his perspective on the essence ubof life.

Villa Bílek has been maintained by the Gallery of the Capital City of Prague (Czech: Galerie hlavního města Prahy) since 1963. It houses a public exposition that introduces many works by Bílek, as well as original interior fittings and furniture collection which was made according to his design.
