= Josef Mauder =

Czech sculptor (1854–1920)

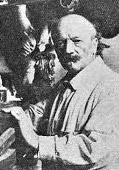
- Born: 1 December 1854; Prague, Bohemia, Austrian Empire
- Died: 15 November 1920 (aged 65); Prague, Czechoslovakia

Josef Mauder (1 December 1854 – 15 November 1920) was a Czech sculptor, painter, art critic and professor.

== Biography ==
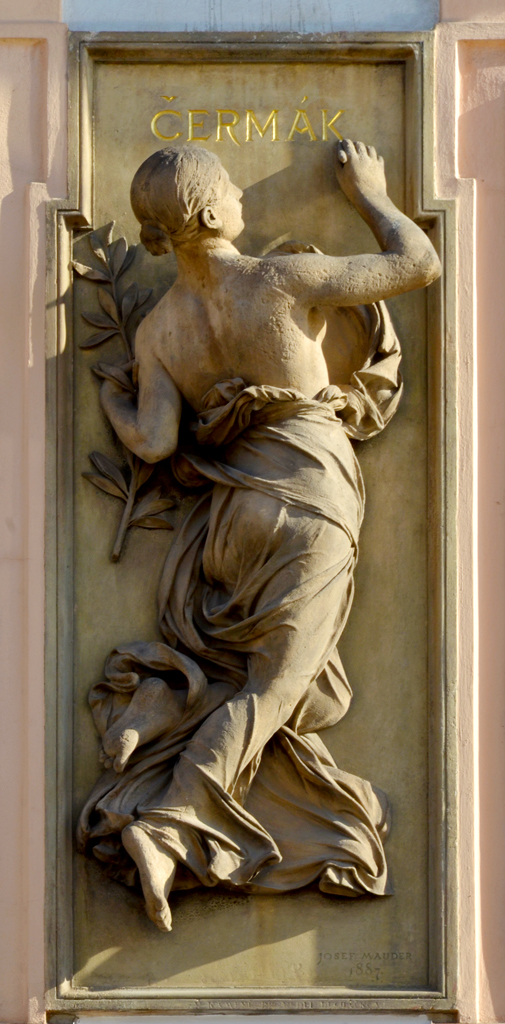
Memorial plaque for Jaroslav Čermák

He was the youngest of four children born to the tailor, František Mauder (1810-1861), and his wife Karolína née Feifarová. His older brothers, Jeroným and Karel, became goldsmiths. In 1869 and 1870, he received two preparatory semesters at the School of Applied Arts then, from 1870 to 1877, studied painting at the Academy of Fine Arts with Josef Matyáš Trenkwald, Jan Swerts and Antonín Lhota. Sculpting was not part of the curriculum there at that time, so he took private lessons in the studios of Tomáš Seidan. He held his first exhibition there in 1875.

After completing his studies, he worked as an assistant at the Academy, and opened his own studio in 1882. The following year, he was appointed a Professor at the State Industrial School, where he taught drawing and modelling until 1911. His students included František Bílek, Stanislav Sucharda and Leonard Rotter.

In 1885, he married Julia Meergansová (1855-1912). They had no children. Shortly after his marriage, he and Julia took an extended trip throughout Italy. Their home became a meeting place for many artists and writers. One of his closest friends was the poet, Julius Zeyer, with whom he shared a passion for collecting antiques. After Zeyer's death in 1901, he created a monument for him at Chotkovy sady, in the Hradčany district.

He was an active member of an association devoted to the support of young artists, and the Union of Fine Artists, which was establishing connections with Russian artists, as part of a Slavic resurgence in German and Austrian territories. An exhibition, chaired by Ilya Repin, was held in Prague in 1900. Two years later, a showing of sculptures by Auguste Rodin was held in Prague. It had a substantial influence on younger sculptors, but Mauder remained unimpressed by the new styles.

He was also a member of a jury appointed by the Prague City Council to assess several proposed monument design competitions, and the sculptural decorations for public buildings. In addition, he was involved in the process of restoring a group of statues by Ferdinand Brokoff that collapsed when the Charles Bridge was damaged by a flood in 1890.

He died at the age of sixty-five, and is interred next to his wife, Julia, at Olšany Cemetery. The relief on his tomb was created by his former student, Bílek. His antique collection was bequeathed to the National Museum, and his remaining sculptures were auctioned off to create a fund for the support of young artists.

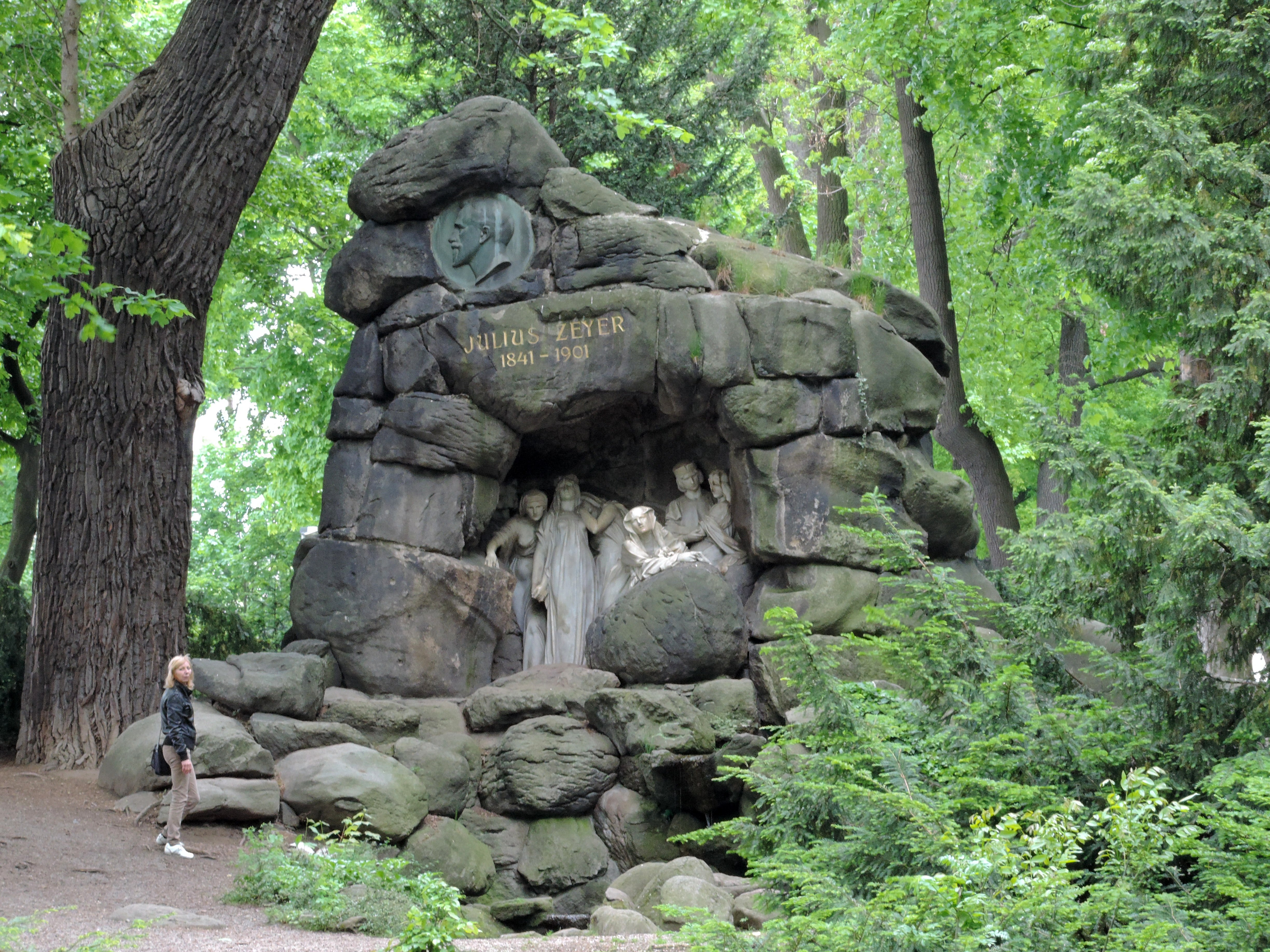
Monument to Julius Zeyer
