= Tomáš Seidan =

Czech sculptor and art teacher

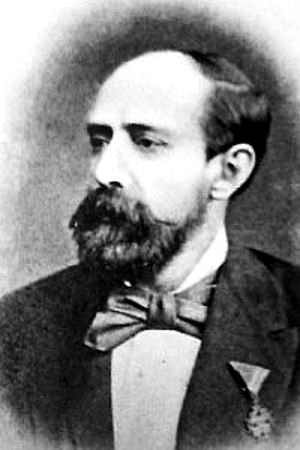
Tomáš Seidan; from Světozor (1890)

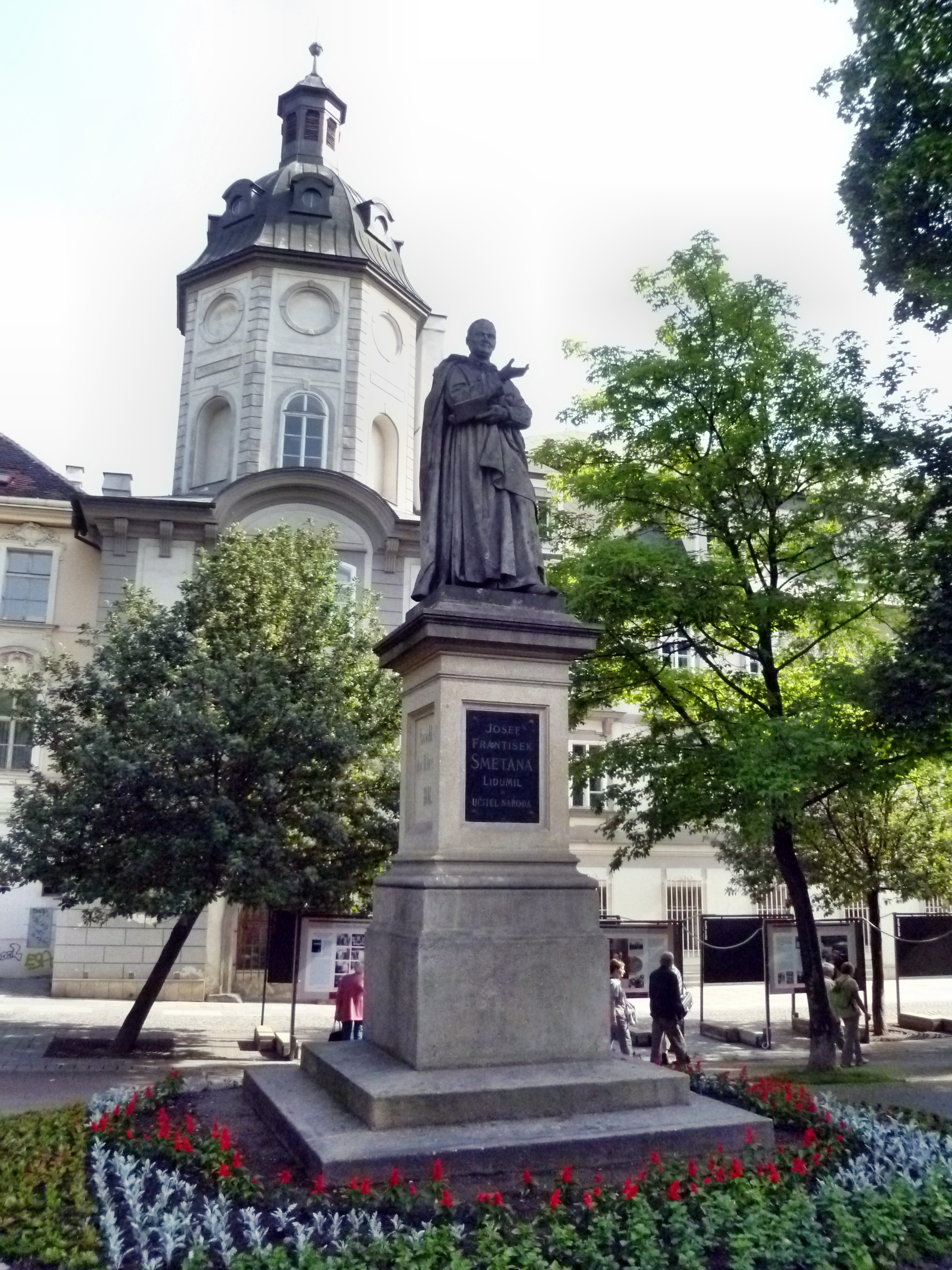
Memorial to Josef František Smetana

Tomáš Seidan (6 September 1830 – 4 December 1890) was a Czech sculptor and art teacher.

== Biography ==
Seidan was born in Prague on 6 September 1830. He was one of nine children born to Antonín Seidan, an engraver in Prague's Old Town. He began studying sculpture with the brothers, Josef and Emanuel Max. From 1843 to 1845, he was a student at the Academy of Fine Arts, Prague, where his primary teacher was the genre painter, Christian Ruben. This was during a period when there were a series of educational reforms, favoring Realism over Academicism.

After 1849, he worked as a porcelain modeler in Stará Role (today part of Karlovy Vary). In 1854, when the famous sculptor Václav Levý left for Rome, Seidan took over his workshop. There was, at that time, no sculpture studio at the academy, so he gave private lessons. Some of his best-known students were Josef Mauder, Josef Václav Myslbek and Ladislav Šaloun. Myslbek would later assist Seidan with his works for the Arsenal in Vienna. For twenty years, Seidan was also a professor of modeling at the Czech Technical University in Prague.

He was a member of Umělecká beseda, Krasoumná jednota (a society for the promotion of the arts), and the Association of St.Luke, a painter's guild.

His most familiar statue is a memorial to the philosopher and historian, Josef František Smetana, in Plzeň; notable for its lack of idealization. Also worth mentioning are his designs for the Palacký Bridge, which were executed by Myslbek and are now on the grounds at Vyšehrad.

Seidan died in Prague on 4 December 1890, aged 60.
