= Jan Hus Memorial =

Sculpture in Prague, Czech Republic

- Pomník mistra Jana Husa (Czech)
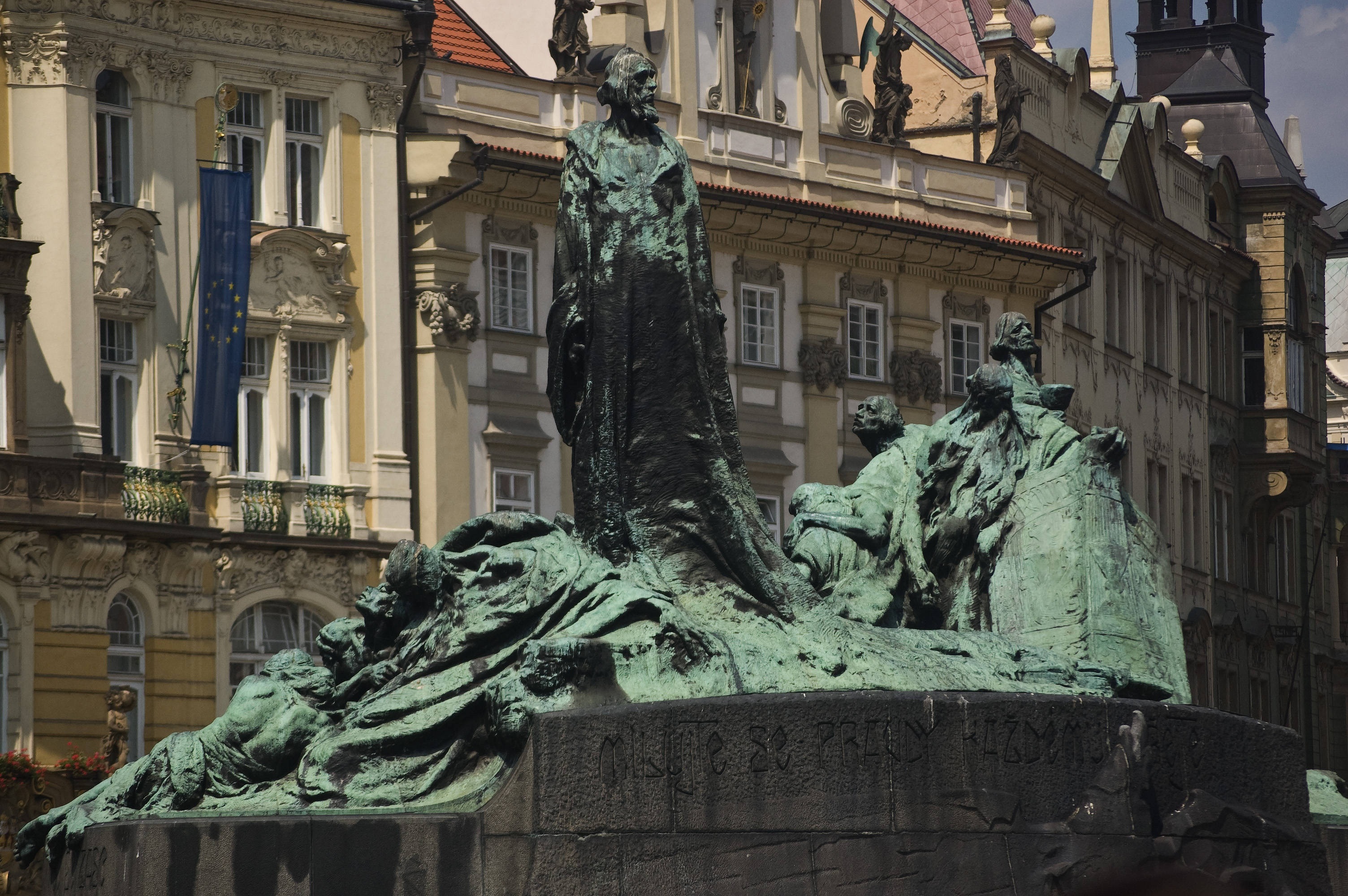
- The memorial in Old Town Square

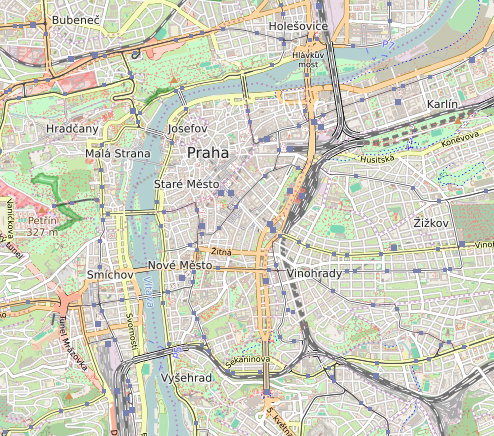
- Location in Prague
- Artist: Ladislav Šaloun
- Location: Prague, Czech Republic; 50°05′16″N 14°25′16″E

The Jan Hus Memorial (Czech: Pomník mistra Jana Husa) stands at one end of Old Town Square, Prague in the Czech Republic. The huge monument depicts victorious Hussite warriors and Protestants who were forced into exile 200 years after Hus in the wake of the lost Battle of the White Mountain during the Thirty Years' War, and a young mother who symbolises national rebirth.

The monument was so large that the sculptor designed and built his own villa and studio where the work could be carried out. It was unveiled in 1915 to commemorate the 500th anniversary of Jan Hus' execution. The memorial was designed by Ladislav Šaloun and paid for solely by public donations.

Born in 1369, Hus became an influential religious thinker, philosopher, and reformer in Prague. He was a key predecessor to the Protestant movement of the sixteenth century. In his works he criticized religious moral decay of the Catholic Church.

Accordingly, the Czech patriot Hus believed that mass should be given in the vernacular, or local language, rather than in Latin. He was inspired by the teachings of John Wycliffe. In the following century, Hus was followed by many other reformers - e.g. Martin Luther, John Calvin and Huldrych Zwingli. Hus was ultimately condemned by the Council of Constance and burned at the stake in 1415. This led to the Hussite Wars.

== Symbolism ==
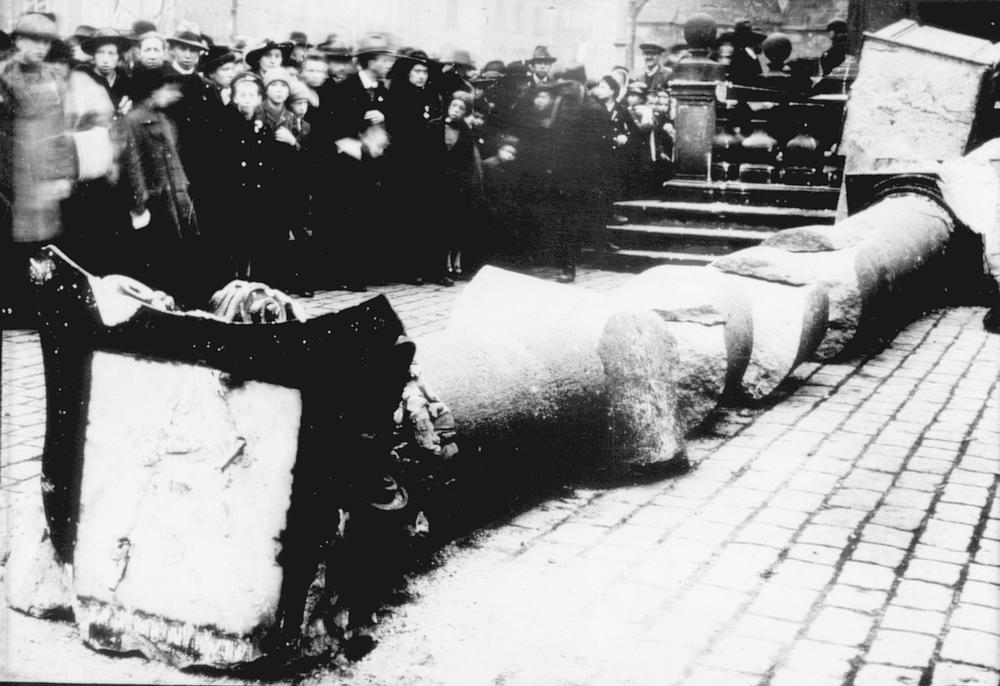
Destroyed Marian Column in Prague

To the people of Bohemia and other regions around Prague, Jan Hus became a symbol of dissidence and a symbol of strength against oppressive regimes. His opposition to church control by the Vatican gave strength to those who opposed control of Czech lands by the Habsburgs in the 19th century, and Hus soon became a symbol of anti-Habsburg rule.

He is said to stand arrogantly in the square in defiance of the cathedral before him. In 1918, a Marian Column that had been erected in the square shortly after the Thirty Years' War was demolished in celebration of independence from the Habsburg monarchy.

When Czechoslovakia was under Communist rule, sitting at the feet of the Jan Hus memorial became a way of quietly expressing one's opinion and opposition against the Communist rule.

The memorial was restored in 2007.

== Another statue of Jan Hus ==
- Statue in the Union Cemetery in Bohemia, New York 40.7691663°N 73.1105865°W. This statue was erected in 1893 by voluntary contributions from Czech immigrants, and it is the first officially dedicated memorial in the United States erected to honour a foreigner.
