= María Luisa Dehesa Gómez Farías =

Mexican architect

- Born: 30 June 1912; Xalapa, Veracruz, Mexico
- Died: 11 March 2009 (aged 96); Mexico City, Mexico
- Other names: María Luisa Dehesa de Millán
- Occupation: Architect
- Years active: 1939–1989
- Spouse: Manuel Millán

María Luisa Dehesa Gómez Farías (30 June 1912 – 11 March 2009) was a Mexican architect who worked for close to 50 years in the Federal District of Mexico City, primarily designing single-family homes and apartment buildings. She was the first Mexican woman to graduate with a degree in architecture.

== Biography ==
María Luisa Dehesa Gómez Farías was born on 30 June 1912 in Xalapa, Veracruz, Mexico to Ramón Dehesa and María Luisa Gómez Farías y Canedo, daughter of the Mexican Minister in London, Benito Gómez Farías. She was the granddaughter of Teodoro A. Dehesa Méndez on her paternal side and great-granddaughter of Valentín Gómez Farías on her maternal side.

In 1933 she enrolled at the Academia de San Carlos (the National School of Architecture) of the National Autonomous University of Mexico. In her class of 113 students, only five were women and they were required to study in a separate workshop from the men. She graduated in 1937, the first Mexican woman to graduate with a degree in architecture. Her thesis, which won honorable mention from the jurors, was entitled "Artillery Barracks Type". It was accepted in 1939 and she attained her professional designation.

After she finished school, Dehesa married Manuel Millán and they subsequently had four children. She joined the Public Works Department in Mexico City and served for nearly 50 years in various divisions, primarily designing single-family homes and apartment buildings. In 1974, she was announced as a joint winner of the Ruth Rivera Prize, together with the first Mexican female civil engineer, Concepción Mendizábal Mendoza. In 2006, the College of Architects of Mexico City, honored her for her contributions.

Notimex published Dehesa's memoirs, entitled Los Años Valientes, with illustrations by her daughter Elizabeth Millán de Guerra, a graphic designer. Dehesa died in Mexico City in 2009.

== Other Sources ==
Universidad Nacional Autónoma de México, Bitacora Arquitectura.
