= Šaloun Villa =

- Šalounova vila
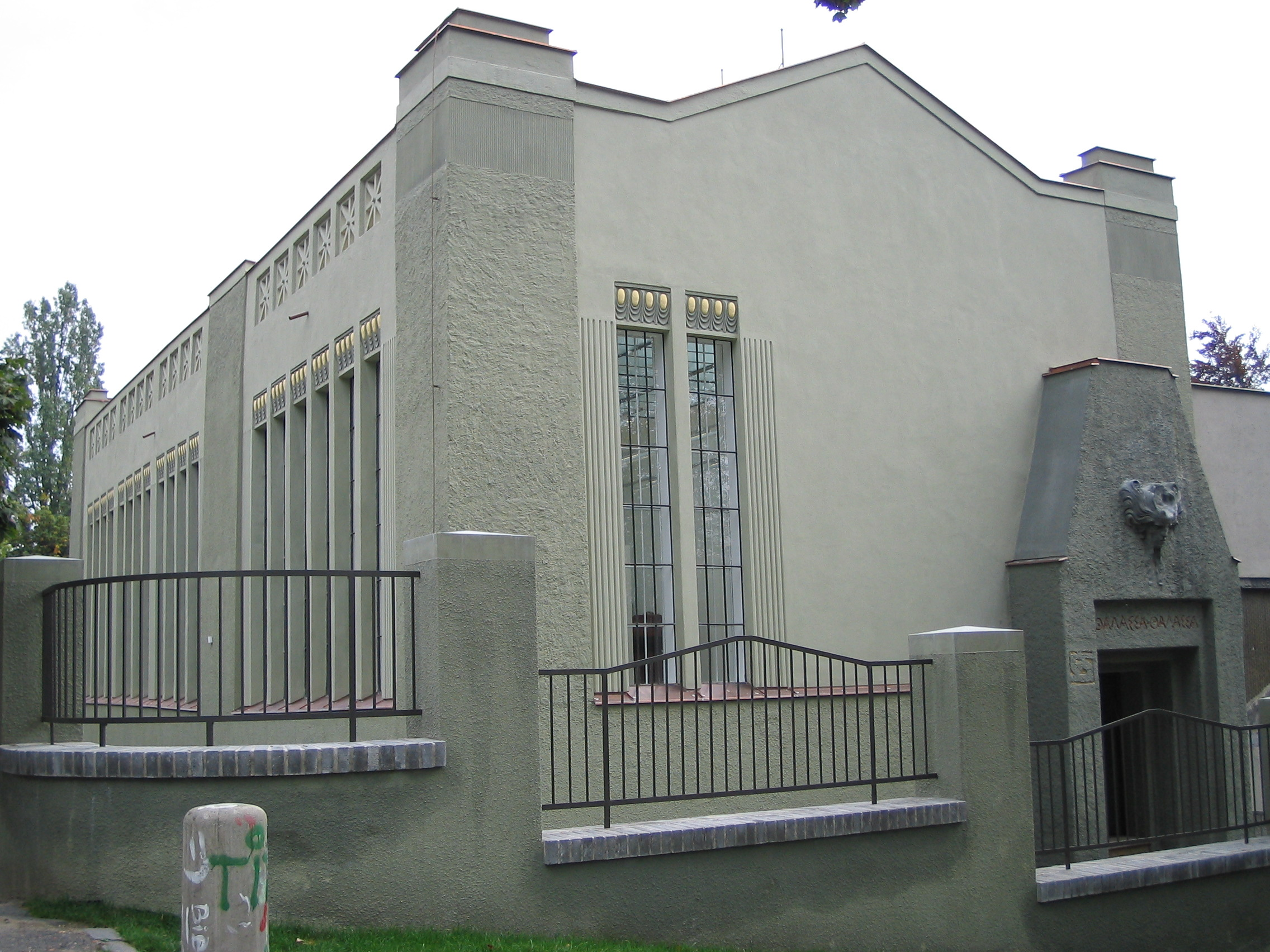
- Šalounova villa

General information
- Location: Slovenská 1566/2, Prague 10, Czech Republic
- Coordinates: 50.0725°N 14.449°E
- Completed: 1912
- Renovated: 1934, 2007
- Client: Ladislav Šaloun
- Owner: The Academy of Fine Arts

Renovating team
- Architect: Michal Bartošek

Šaloun Villa (Czech: Šalounova vila) is a studio in Prague designed by and for the sculptor Ladislav Šaloun. The villa was designed and built to construct the Jan Hus Memorial but it was also a meeting place for the Czech intelligentsia. Today the building has been restored and it is used for education.

== History ==
Ladislav Šaloun had the studio built when he won the commission for the gigantic Jan Hus Memorial as he needed a large space to create the asymmetrical memorial that now stands in Old Town Square in Prague. The memorial that became a symbol of Czech self-government was dedicated to Jan Hus who was burned as a heretic in 1415 after refusing to recant his independent views. Šaloun part designed the Art Nouveau villa and there he enjoyed visits from the Czech intelligentsia. Visitors included the painter Alphonse Mucha, the soprano Emmy Destinn, Karel and Josef Čapek, the violinist Jan Kubelík and his son Rafael Kubelík the conductor and Otokar Březina the poet.

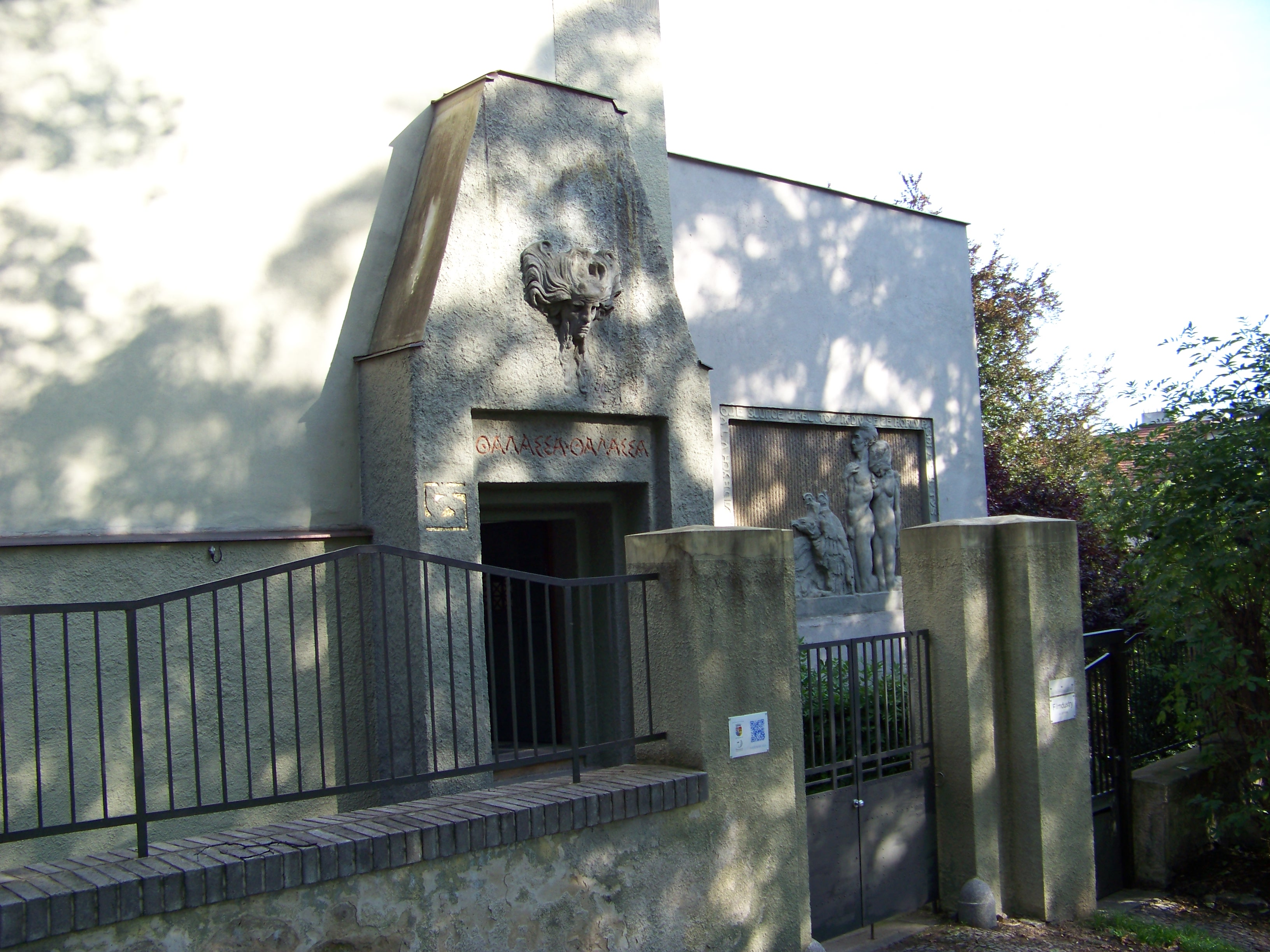
The entrance and its inscription of "The Sea! The Sea!"

The building was reported to be in a very poor state at the end of the communist rule in the country. At the end of that period the villa was occupied by a sculptor supported by commissions for busts of leading politicians like the Czechoslovak prime minister Klement Gottwald. The villa received a long period of restoration overseen by the architect Michal Bartošek between 2006 and 2007.

Today the building is owned by the Academy of Fine Arts in Prague and it is used as a teaching space by visiting academics.

== Description ==
The Art Nouveau design was developed by Saloun and includes the inscription "The Sea! the Sea!" which is thought to be a reference to the statement reported by the historian Xenophon of an army whose retreat from Persia took them to the security of the Black Sea coast. Another inscription on the villa is a verse by Saloun's friend Otokar Brezina who also suggested the villa's wall relief entitled "Greeting to the Sun". There is another design which is based on the signs of the zodiac. (Saloun's friend, the print maker Josef Vachal, said in his many writings said that there were "occult practices" that took place in the villa's basement.)

The villa stands out from its surrounding buildings because the design is seen as "modern" even though the design is about a hundred years old. Inside the villa there is a room inspired by Moravian folklore as well as an exhibition room and the parlour that hosted Saloun's guests.
