= Ladislav Šaloun =

Czech sculptor (1870–1946)

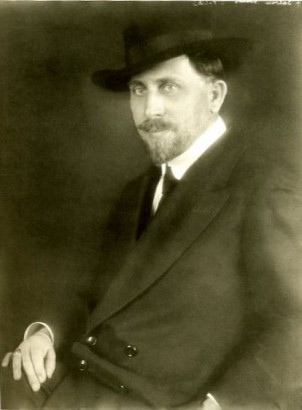
- Born: 1 August 1870; Prague, Bohemia, Austria-Hungary
- Died: 18 October 1946 (aged 76); Prague, Czechoslovakia
- Occupation: Sculptor

Ladislav Jan Šaloun (1 August 1870 – 18 October 1946) was a Czech sculptor of the Art Nouveau period.

== Life ==
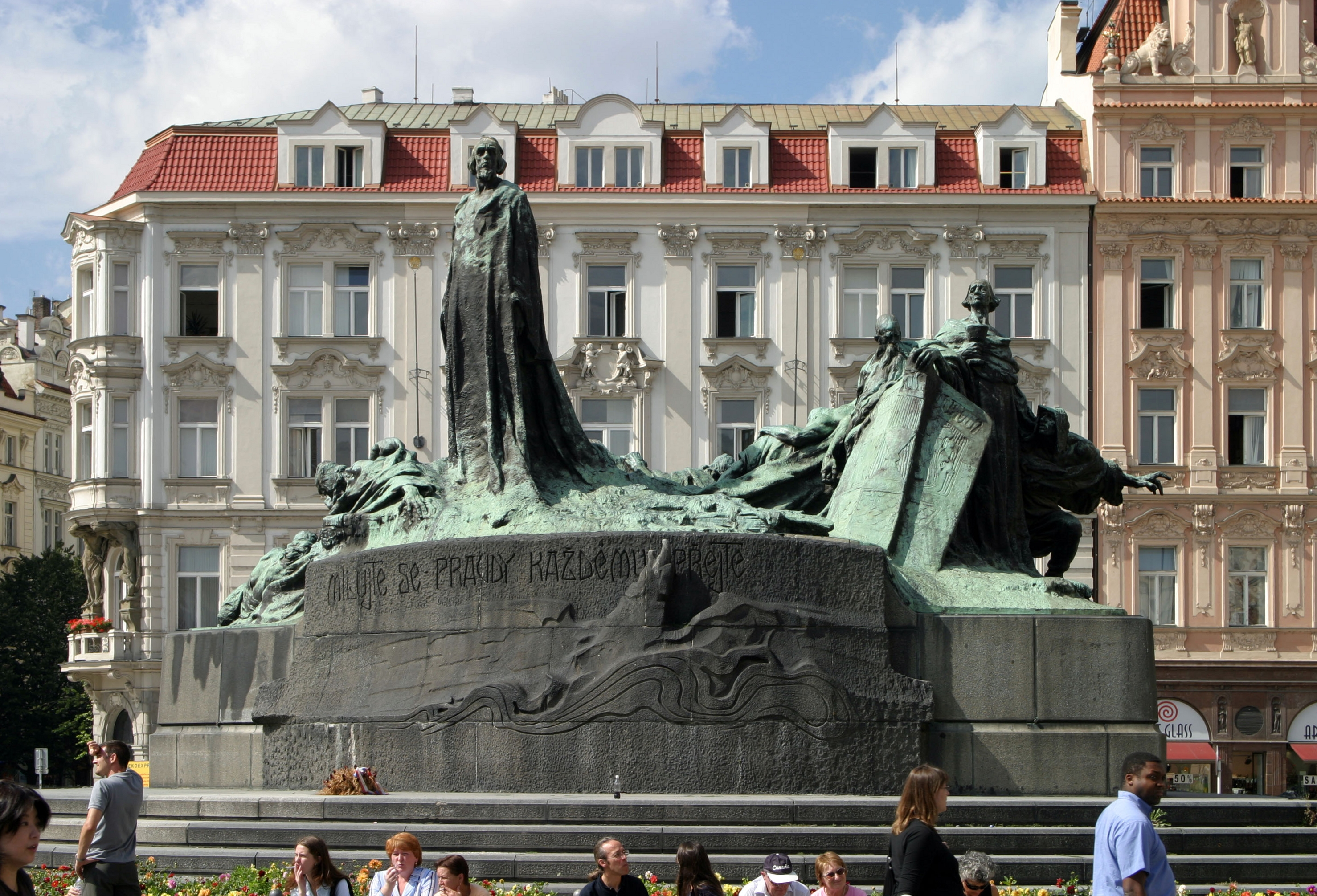
Statue of Jan Hus in Prague's Old Town Square

Šaloun was born in 1870 in Prague and he studied in the studios of Tomáš Seidan and Bohuslav Schnirch. He was involved as an artist in the Mánes Union of Fine Arts. This independent education allowed him to avoid the influence of Josef Václav Myslbek, looking instead to the work of Auguste Rodin. He was later admitted to the Czech Academy of Sciences in 1912 but never took training there. In 1927 he was appointed the civic artistic advisor for the city of Prague in 1927, and in 1946 was honored by being named a National Artist.

Šaloun worked on his Jan Hus Memorial on the Old Town Square in Prague for 15 years, from 1901 through 1915. During this time this commission required a much larger studio so he designed Šaloun's Villa where he lived and entertained. This house in Vinohrady is one of the outstanding proto-modernist buildings of its Prague district. He also produced similar Hus monuments for the towns of Hořice (1911–1913) and Libáň (1925). His architectural sculpture for the Municipal House, finished in 1911, is one example of his collaborations with Czech architect Osvald Polívka.

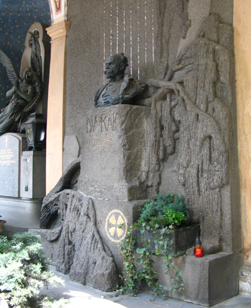
Bust at Antonín Dvořák's tomb, Vyšehrad Cemetery, Prague

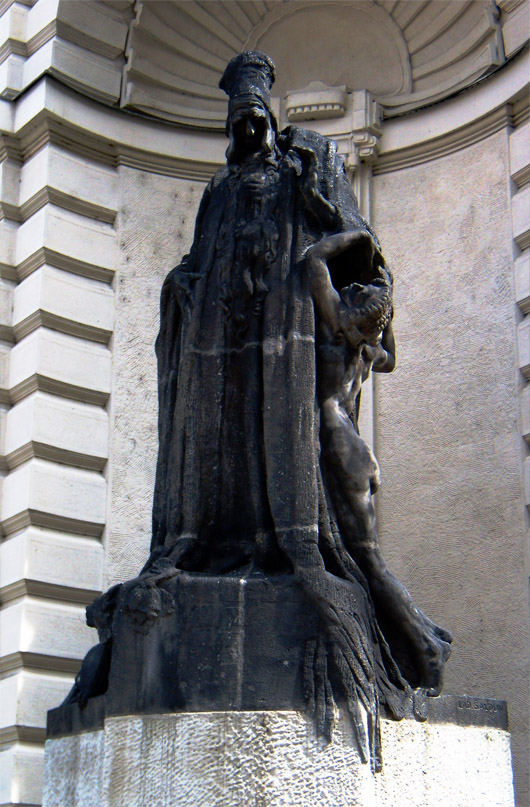
Statue of the Rabbi Judah Loew ben Bezalel, known as Maharal, a noted philosopher; New City Hall (1917)

According to Cannon-Brooks, "From the beginning he was extremely prolific and his exceptional facility... led on occasion to a certain superficiality, for which he has been over-criticized."

Šaloun is buried in the Vyšehrad Cemetery, not far from his bust of Antonín Dvořák marking the composer's grave.

== Architectural sculptures ==
- City of Prague Museum, with architects Antonín Wiehl and Antonin Balšánek, 1895–1898;
- Hlahol Building, Prague, with architect Josef Fanta, 1903–1906;
- Hotel Europa, Wenceslas Square, Prague, with architect Alois Dryák for the 1905 redesign;
- New City Hall, Prague, with Osvald Polívka, 1908–1911;
- Municipal House, Prague, with Polívka, circa 1912;
- Allegorical Art Nouveau statues flanking the entrance to the Gallery of Modern Art in Hradec Králové, representing Trade and Harvest (the building was originally a credit institution), with Polívka;
- Many other apartment houses and other buildings including Šaloun's Villa.
