= Hradčany =

City district surrounding Prague Castle in Prague, Czech Republic

- Cadastral Area of Prague
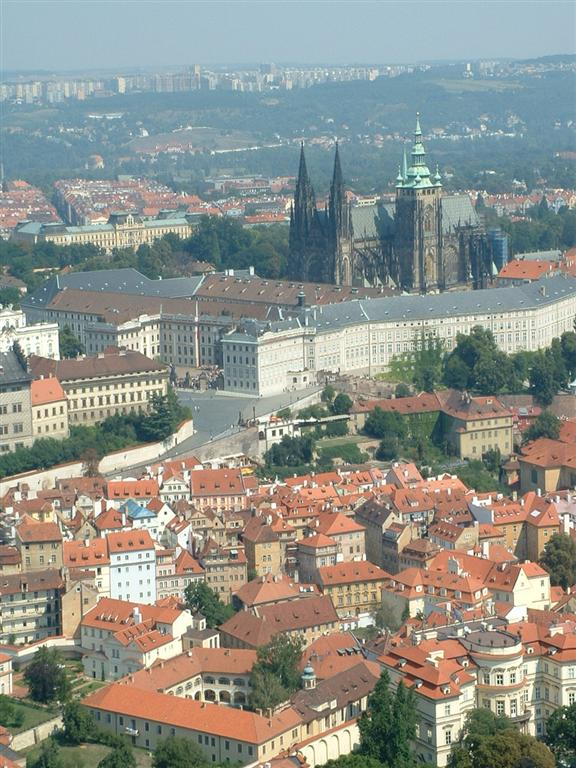
- Hradčany from the Petřín Tower

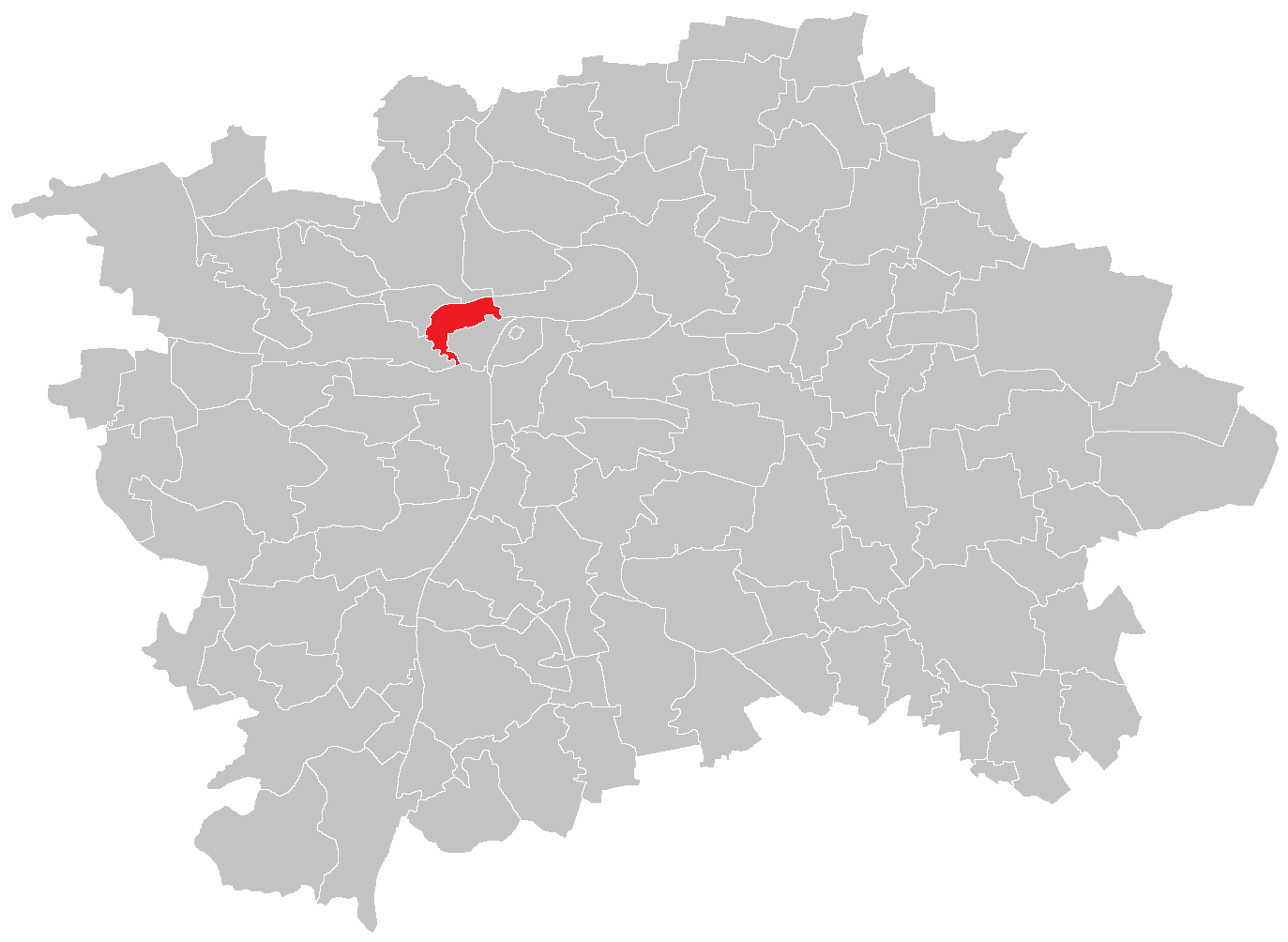
- Location of Hradčany in Prague
- Coordinates: 50°05′29″N 14°23′50″E
- Country: Czech Republic
- Region: Prague
- District: Prague 1, Prague 6

Area
  - Total: 1.51 km^{2} (0.58 sq mi)

Population (2021)
  - Total: 1,774
  - Density: 1,170/km^{2} (3,040/sq mi)
- Time zone: UTC+1 (CET)
  - Summer (DST): UTC+2 (CEST)

Hradčany (Czech pronunciation: [ˈɦratʃanɪ]; German: Hradschin), is the district of the city of Prague, Czech Republic surrounding Prague Castle.

The castle is one of the biggest in the world at about 570 metres (1,870 feet) in length and an average of about 130 metres (430 feet) wide. Its history stretches back to the 9th century. St Vitus Cathedral is located in the castle area.

Most of the district consists of noble historical palaces. There are many other attractions for visitors: romantic nooks, peaceful places and beautiful lookouts.

Hradčany was an independent borough until 1784, when the four independent boroughs that had formerly constituted Prague were proclaimed a single city. The other three were Malá Strana (German: Kleinseite, Lesser Quarter), Staré Město (German: Altstadt, Old Town) and Nové Město (German: Neustadt, New Town).

== Demographics ==
Historical population
Year	Pop.	±%
1869	5,940	—
1880	12,330	+107.6%
1890	12,584	+2.1%
1900	12,906	+2.6%
1910	10,580	−18.0%
1921	10,732	+1.4%
1930	9,100	−15.2%
1950	8,203	−9.9%
1961	6,154	−25.0%
1970	4,590	−25.4%
1980	3,464	−24.5%
1991	2,797	−19.3%
2001	2,313	−17.3%
2011	2,079	−10.1%
2021	1,774	−14.7%
Source: Censuses

== Photo gallery ==
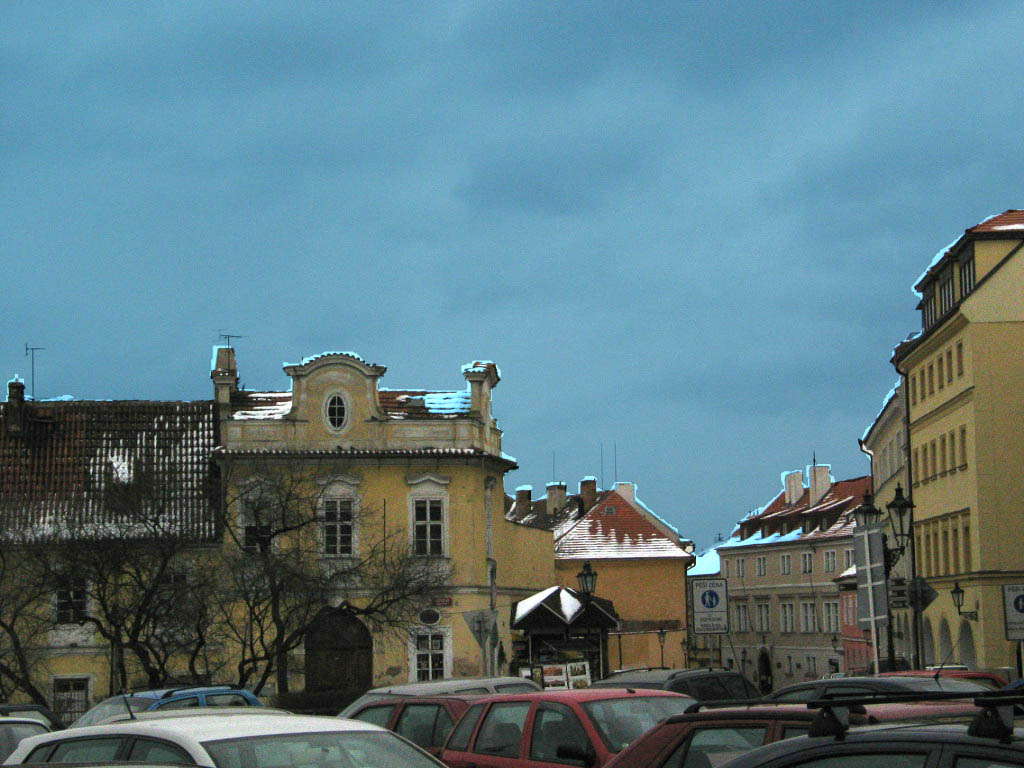
The architecture of Hradčany Neighborhood

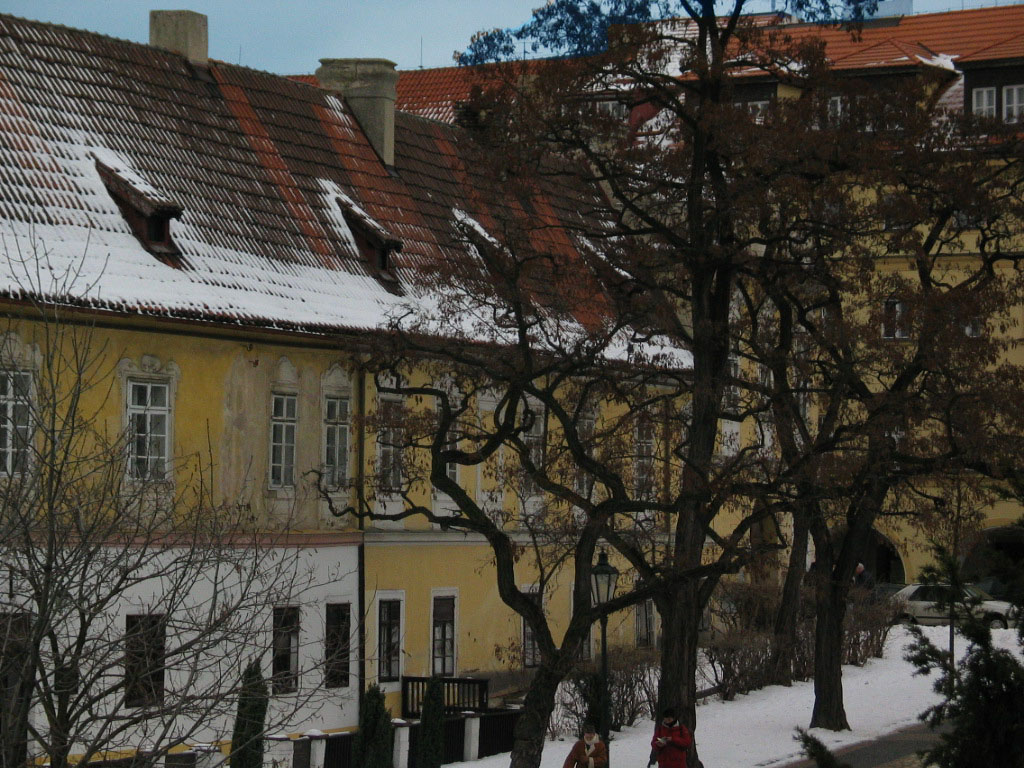
In a quiet corner of Hradčany neighborhood.

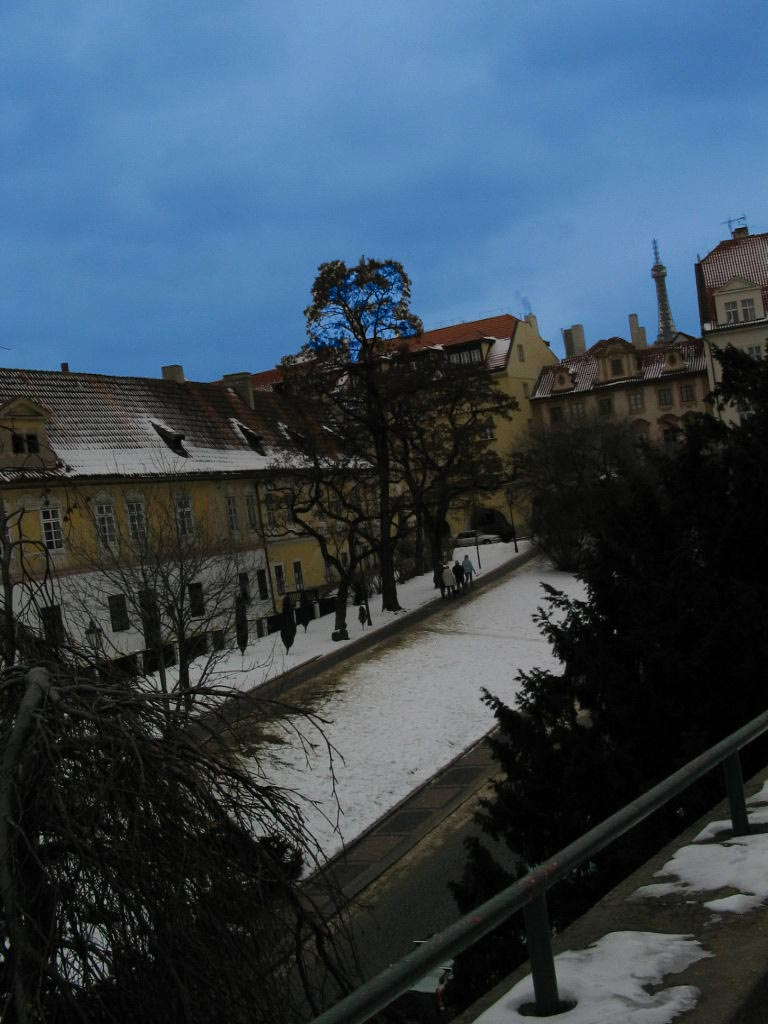
The promenade at Hradčany

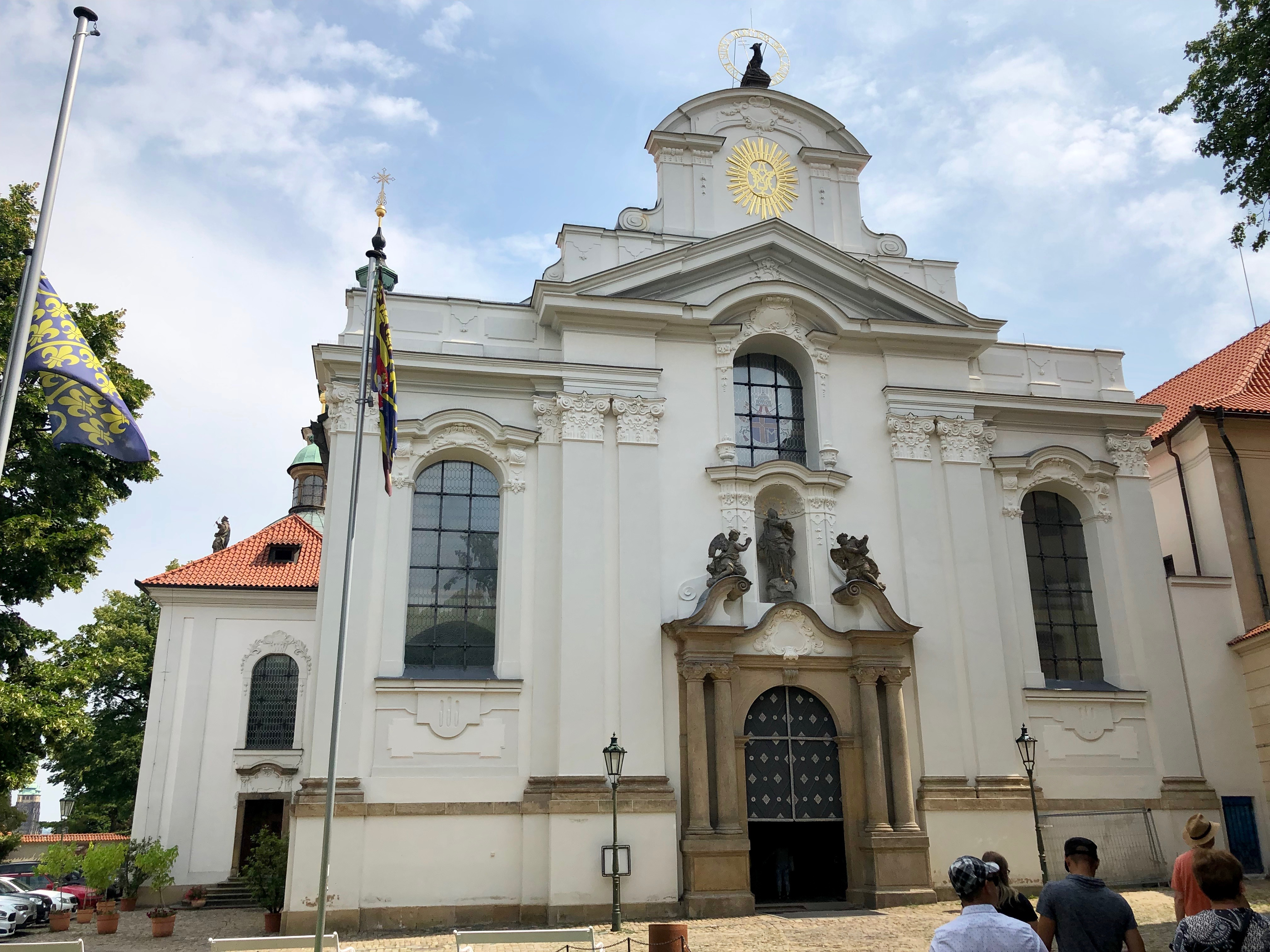
Church at Hradčany

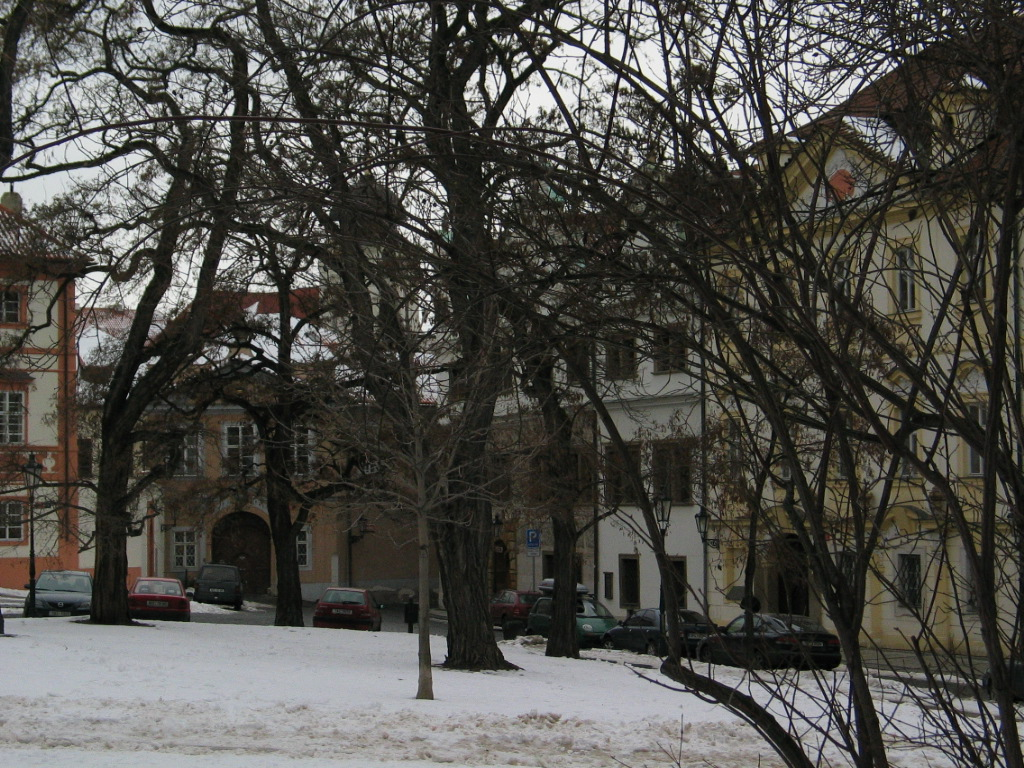
A little park a few steps away from Prague Castle

Charles Bridge and Hradčany, between 1880 and 1893
