= 1963 in architecture =

The year 1963 in architecture involved some significant architectural events and new buildings.

== Events ==
- October 28 – Work begins on demolition of Pennsylvania Station (New York City), surface buildings designed by McKim, Mead and White in 1910, a key influence on the historic preservation movement.
- Work begins on the Ostankino Tower, designed by Nikolai Nikitin.
- Work begins on the University of East Anglia in Norwich, England, designed by Denys Lasdun.
- Team 4 architectural practice established by Richard Rogers, Norman Foster and their respective wives.
- The avant-garde architectural collective Archigram stages the Living Cities exhibition at the Institute of Contemporary Arts in London.

== Buildings and structures ==
=== Buildings opened ===
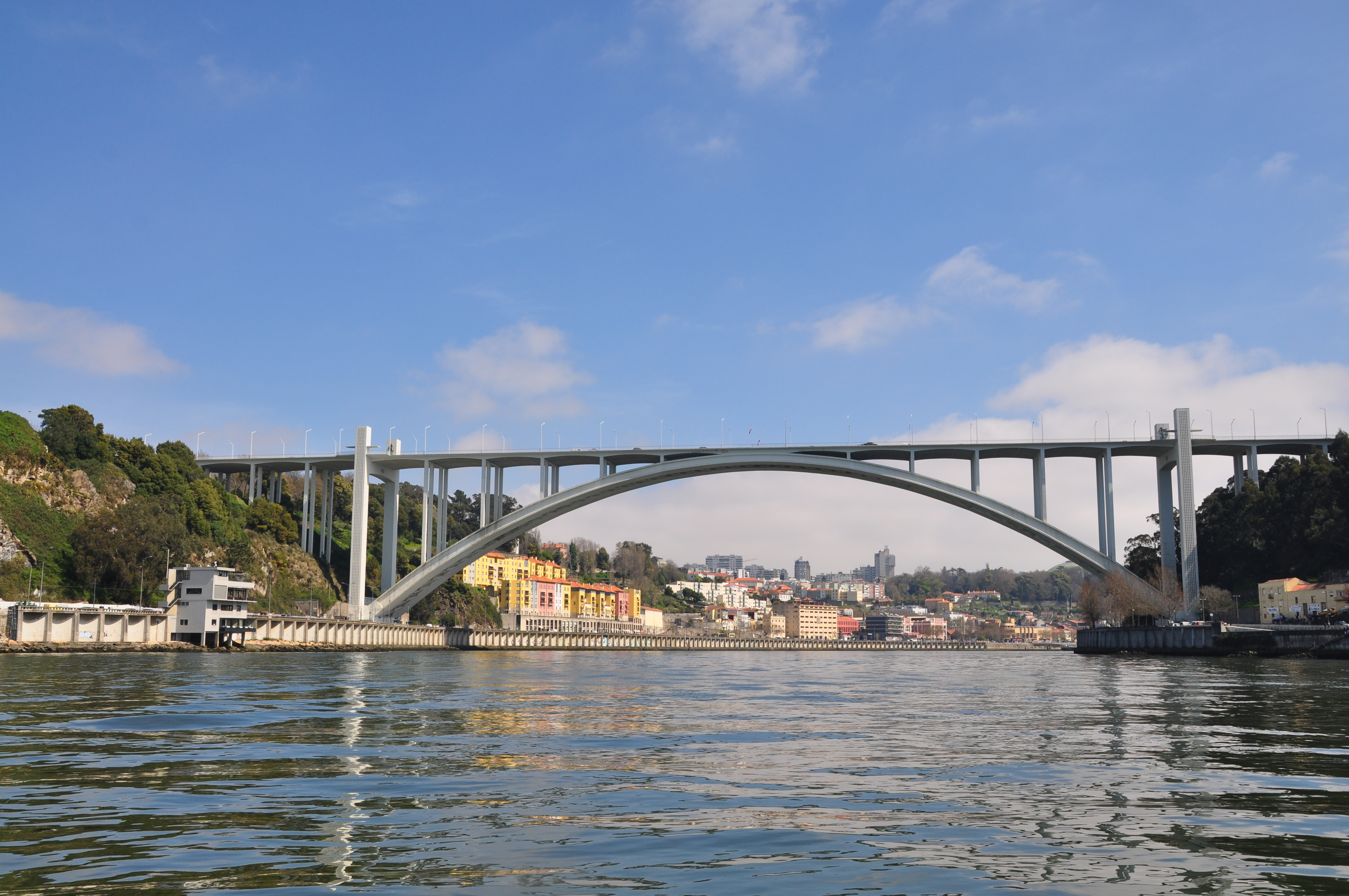
Arrábida Bridge, Douro river, Portugal

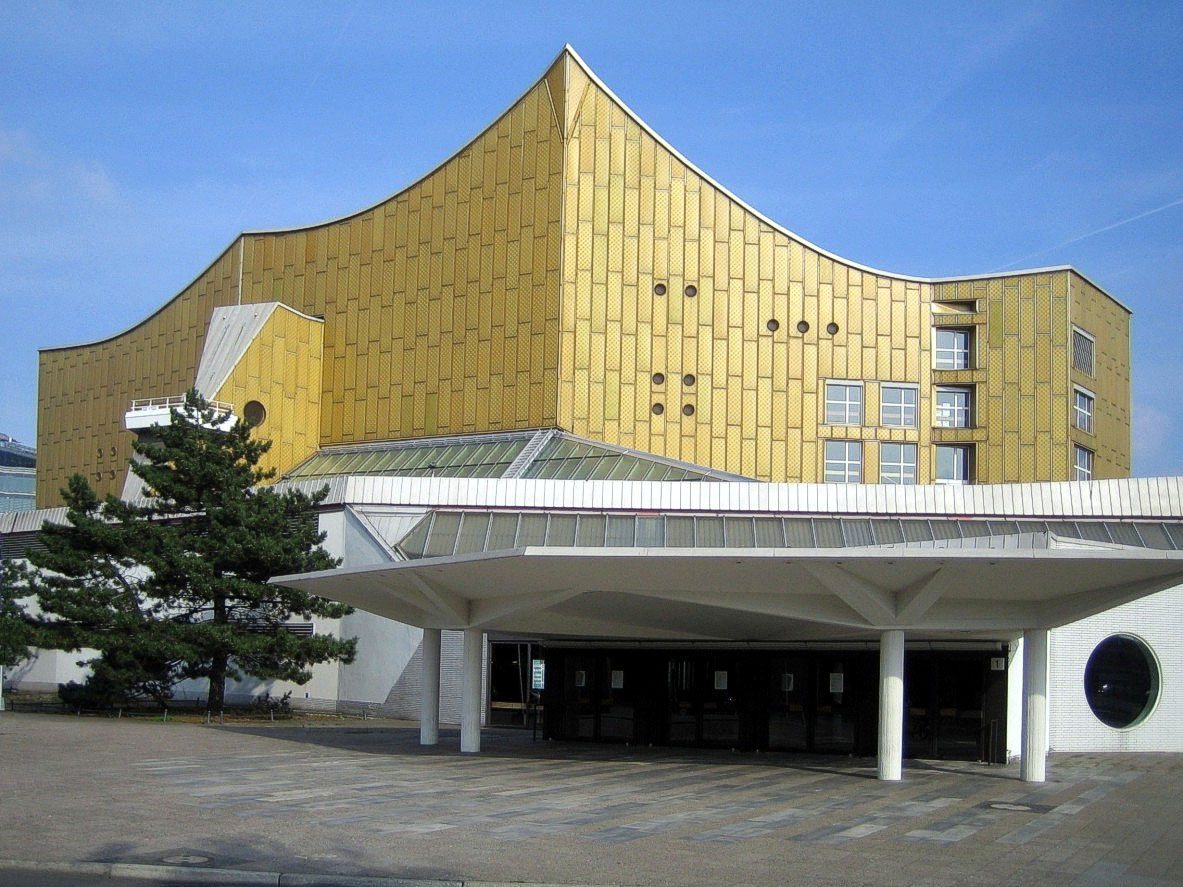
Berliner Philharmonie, Germany

- February – Springs Mills Building on Manhattan, New York, United States, designed by Harrison & Abramovitz.
- March 7 – MetLife Building on Manhattan, New York, United States, designed by Richard Roth.
- June 22 – Arrábida Bridge, Douro river, Portugal, designed by Edgar Cardoso.
- October 15 – Berliner Philharmonie concert hall, designed by Hans Scharoun.
- November – Phoenix Life Insurance Company Building in Hartford, Connecticut, designed by Max Abramovitz.

=== Buildings completed ===
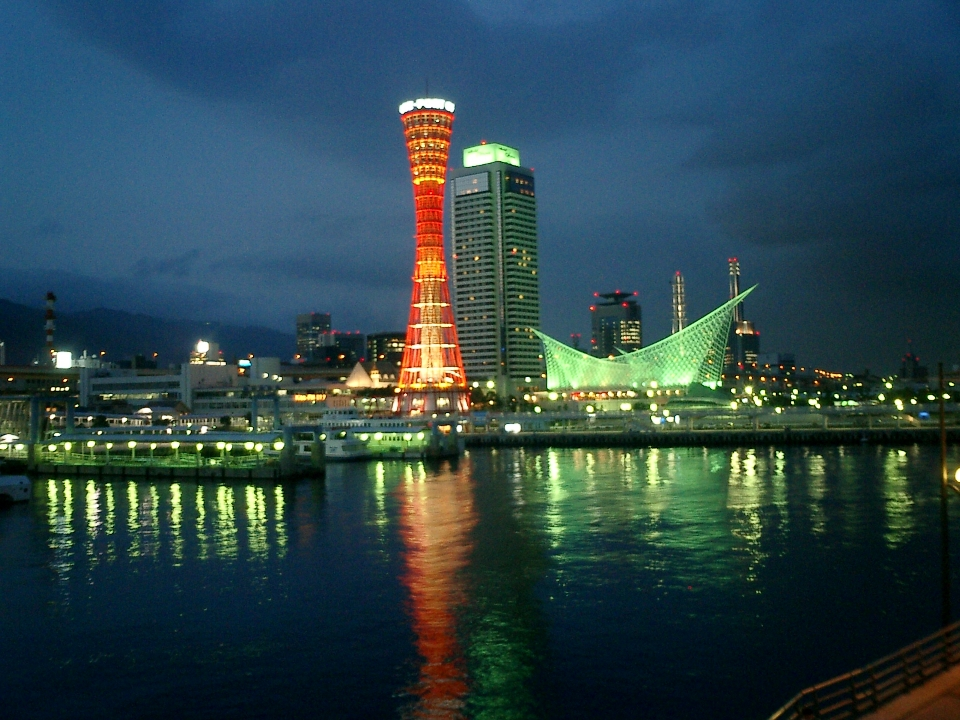
Kobe Port Tower in Kobe, Japan

- St John the Baptist's Church, Ermine, Lincoln, Lincoln, England, designed by Sam Scorer.
- Großer Sendesaal (concert hall) of Hanover Broadcast Station in West Germany, designed by Dieter Oesterlen.
- Bankside Power Station in London, designed by Giles Gilbert Scott. (Adaptive reuse as the Tate Modern art museum in 2000.)
- Vickers Tower on Millbank in London, designed by Ronald Ward and Partners.
- Alexander Fleming House, Blocks A-C, at Elephant and Castle in London, designed by Ernő Goldfinger.
- Darwin Building, Royal College of Art, South Kensington, London, designed by H. T. and Elizabeth Cadbury-Brown, Sir Hugh Casson and Robert Goodden.
- University of Leicester Engineering Building, England, designed by James Stirling and James Gowan.
- Alpha House, Coventry, England, built, a 17-storey residential tower block, the world's first multi-storey building erected by the "jack block" system devised by Felix Adler of Richard Costain (Construction) Ltd.
- Beinecke Rare Book & Manuscript Library at Yale University, designed by Gordon Bunshaft of Skidmore, Owings & Merrill.
- Core buildings of Fitzwilliam College, Cambridge, designed by Denys Lasdun.
- Salk Institute, by Louis I. Kahn, at La Jolla, California.
- Exxon Building in Houston, Texas.
- Hotel Ivoire, Abidjan, Ivory Coast, designed by Moshe Mayer.
- Jamaraat Bridge, Mina, Saudi Arabia.
- Kobe Port Tower in Kobe, Japan.
- Bunshaft Residence (sometimes called the Travertine House) in East Hampton, New York: designed by architect Gordon Bunshaft for himself and his wife, and his only residential project.
- Sadovnichesky Bridge, Vodootvodny Canal, Moscow.

== Awards ==
- American Academy of Arts and Letters Gold Medal – Ludwig Mies van der Rohe
- AIA Gold Medal – Alvar Aalto
- RAIA Gold Medal – Arthur Stephenson
- RIBA Royal Gold Medal – William Holford
- Grand Prix de Rome, architecture – Jean-Louis Girodet

== Publications ==
- John Summerson – The Classical Language of Architecture (BBC).

== Births ==
- October 16 – Filipe Oliveira Dias, Portuguese architect and writer
- October 17 – Alejandro Zaera Polo, Spanish architect and teacher
- June 24 – Benedetta Tagliabue, Italian architect based in Barcelona

== Deaths ==
- February 11 – Elmar Lohk, Estonian architect (born 1901)
- February 21 – Philip Hepworth, English architect (born 1890)
- March 17 – Adalberto Libera, Italian modernist architect (born 1903)
- March 22 – Herbert James Rowse, English architect working in Liverpool (born 1887)
- April 5 – J. J. P. Oud, Dutch architect (born 1890)
- April 23 – Adrian Gilbert Scott, English church architect, grandson of Sir George Gilbert Scott (born 1901)
