= 1965 in architecture =

The year 1965 in architecture involved some significant architectural events and new buildings.

== Events ==
- Reconstruction of Skopje in Yugoslavia planned by Kenzō Tange and team.

== Buildings and structures ==
=== Buildings opened ===
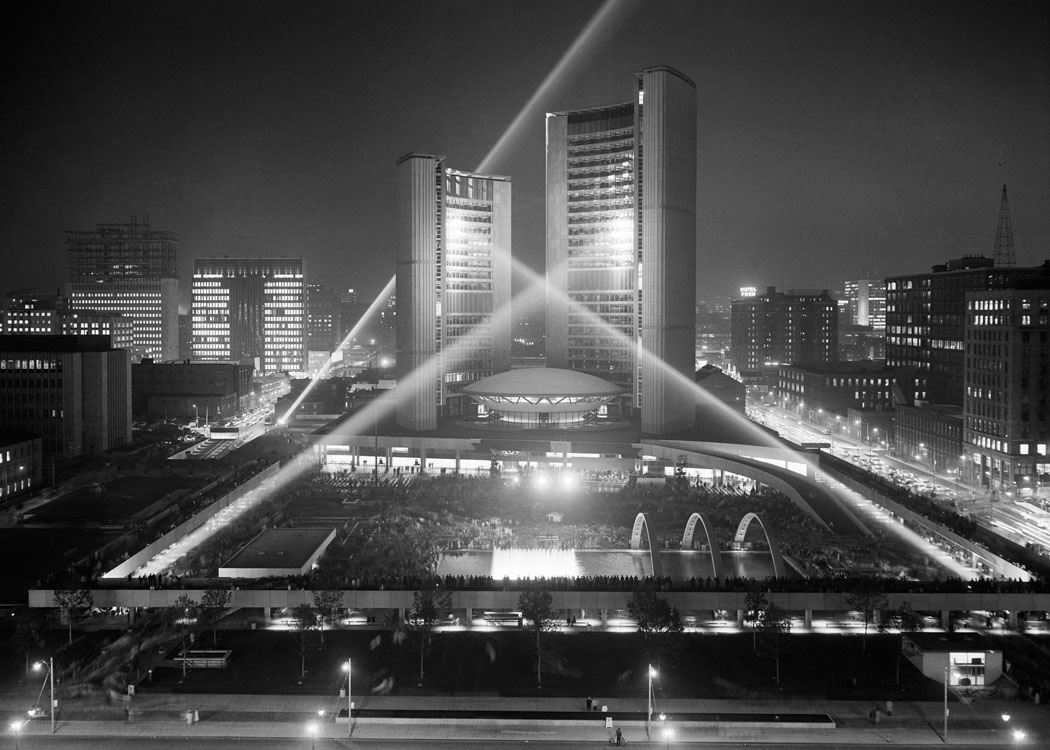
Toronto City Hall opening

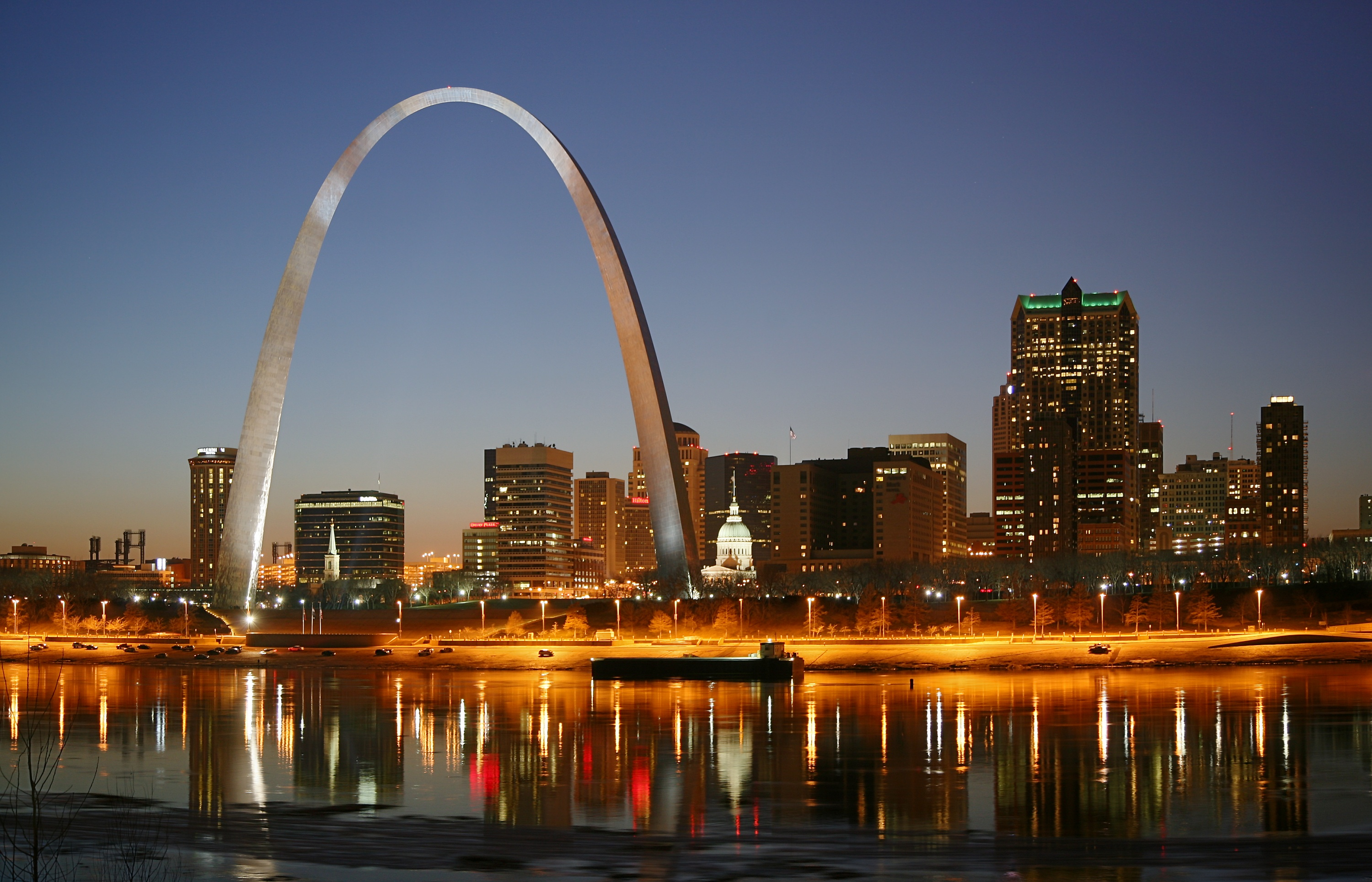
Gateway Arch, St. Louis, USA

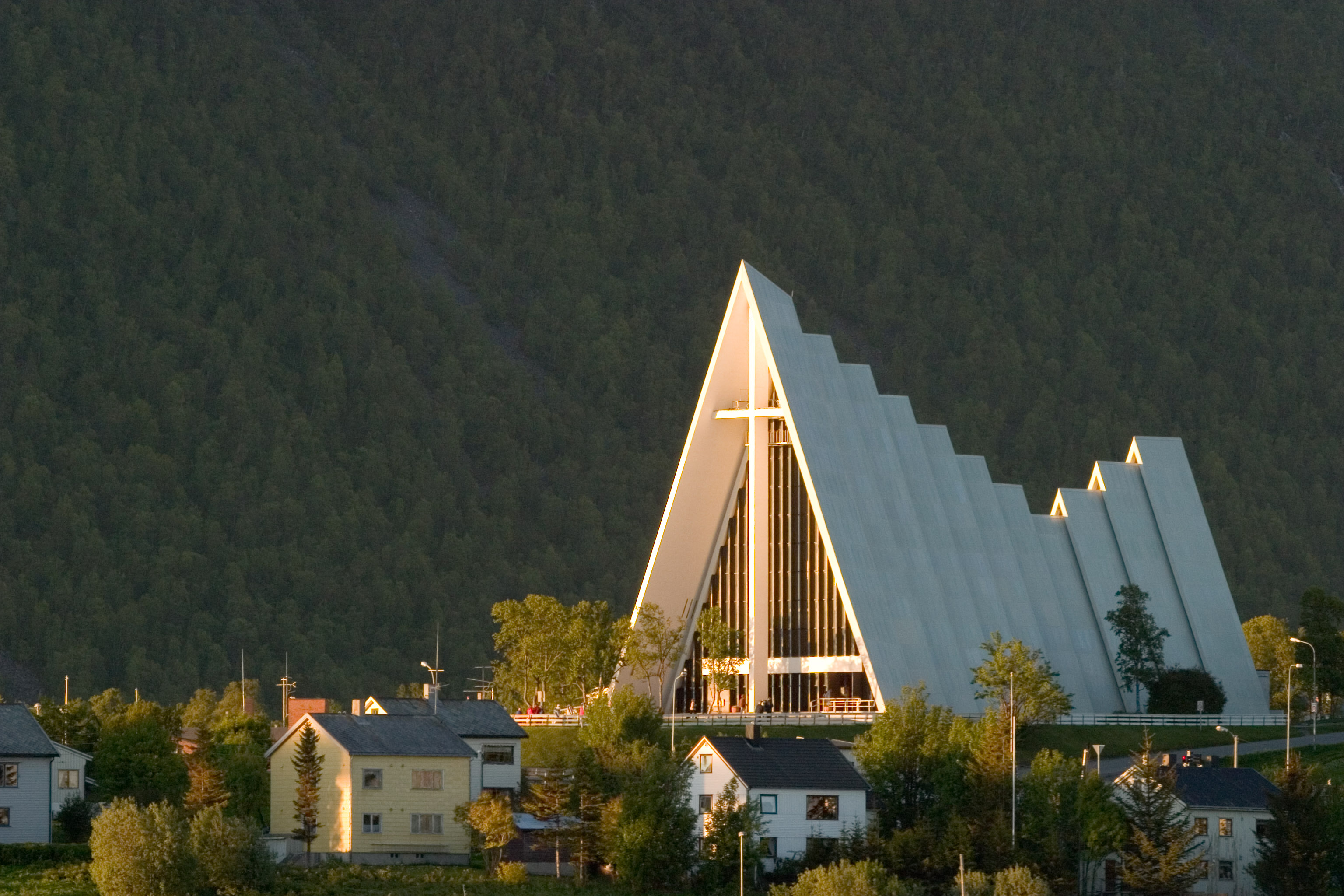
Arctic Cathedral, Tromsø, Norway

- August 15 – Cathedral of Our Lady Assumed into Heaven and St Nicholas, Galway, Ireland, designed by John J. Robinson, is dedicated.
- September – Toronto City Hall in Toronto, Ontario, Canada.
- October 6
  - Skylon Tower in Niagara Falls, designed by B+H Architects.
  - Post Office Tower in London, UK, designed by Eric Bedford and G. R. Yeats and topped out in 1964, is officially opened by Prime Minister Harold Wilson.
- October 28 – Gateway Arch (opened as Jefferson National Expansion Memorial) in St. Louis, Missouri, designed by Eero Saarinen.
- November 19 – Arctic Cathedral, Tromsø, Norway, designed by Jan Inge Hovig, is dedicated.
- December 28 – Museo de Arte de Ponce, Puerto Rico, designed by Edward Durell Stone.
- Shalom Meir Tower in Tel Aviv, Israel, designed by Yitzhak Pearlstein, Gideon Ziv and Meir Levy.
- The first phase of the University of California, Irvine campus, designed by William Pereira.
- The first phase of the University of California, Santa Cruz campus, designed by John Carl Warnecke.

=== Buildings completed ===
- Akosombo Dam, Ghana.
- Holyoke Center at Harvard University, Boston, United States, designed by Josep Lluís Sert.
- Richard J. Daley Center in Chicago, United States, designed by Jacques Brownson of C. F. Murphy Associates.
- NASA Vertical Assembly Building at Kennedy Space Center Launch Complex 39, Florida, United States.
- Seinajoki Town Hall in Finland, designed by Alvar Aalto.
- St Michael and All Angels Church, Woodchurch, Birkenhead, England, designed by Richard O'Mahony of F. X. Velarde Partners.
- Nozema Zendstation, The Hague, Netherlands.
- Elephant and Rhinoceros Pavilion, London Zoo, designed by Hugh Casson and Neville Conder.

== Awards ==
- Architecture Firm Award – Wurster, Bernardi & Emmons
- RAIA Gold Medal – Osborn McCutcheon
- RIBA Royal Gold Medal – Kenzo Tange

== Births ==
- April 10 – Diébédo Francis Kéré, Burkinabè architect
- April 13 – Patricio Pouchulu, Argentine architect
- June 21 – Smiljan Radić Clarke, Chilean architect
- Monica Ponce de Leon, Venezuelan-born architect and educator
- Kerstin Thompson, Australian architect

== Deaths ==
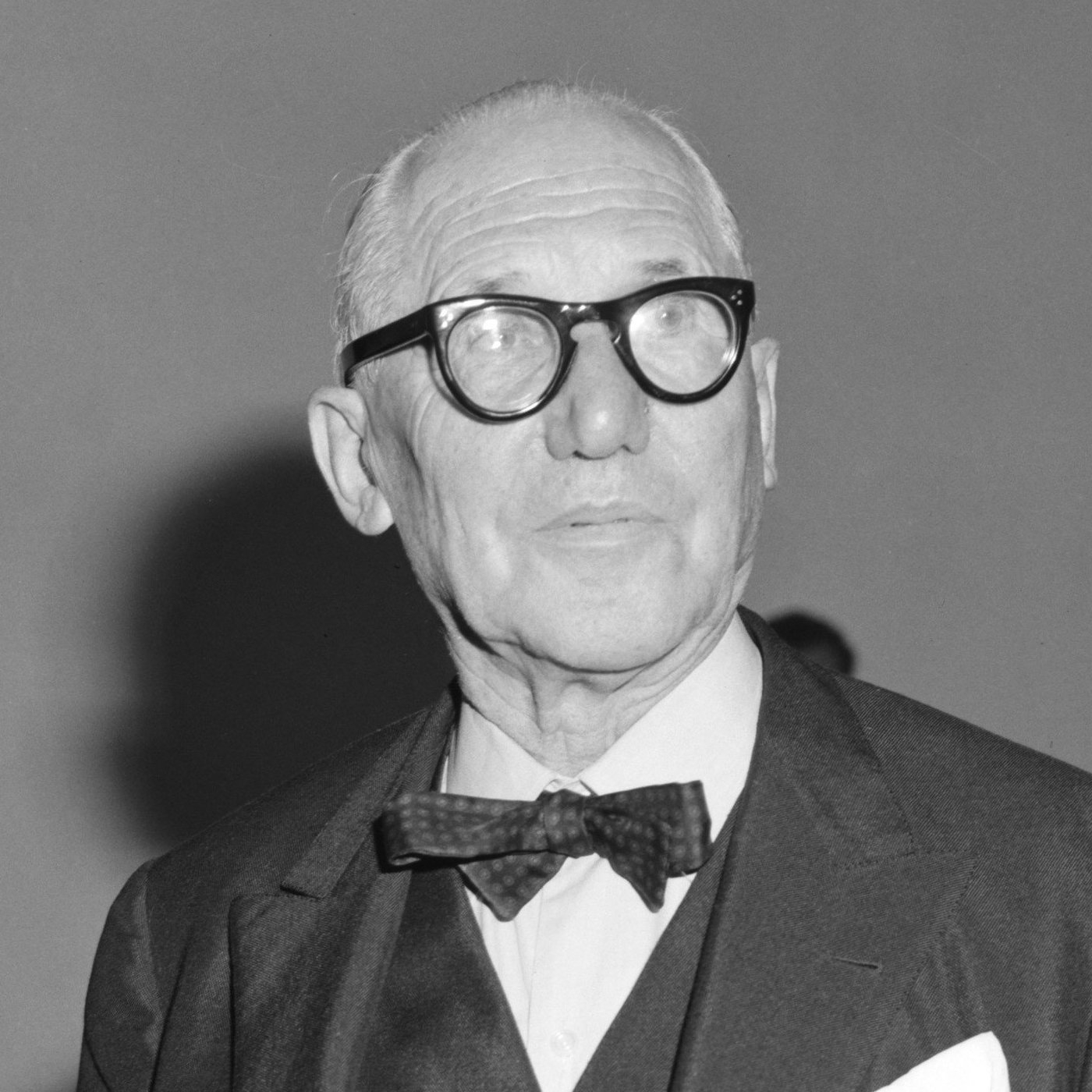
Le Corbusier

- January 11 – Florestano Di Fausto, Italian architect working around the Mediterranean (born 1890)
- January 23 – Ingrid Wallberg, Swedish architect (born 1890)
- May 10 – Karl Burman, Ukrainian-Estonian architect and painter (born 1882)
- June 21 – Kay Fisker, Danish architect, designer and educator (born 1893)
- August 6 – Donald McMorran, English neo-Georgian architect (born 1904)
- August 27 – Le Corbusier (Charles Edouard Jeanneret), Swiss-French architect, designer, painter, urban planner and writer (born 1887)
- September 13 – Louis Laybourne Smith, Australian architect and educator (born 1880)
- November 30 – William Strudwick Arrasmith, American architect, designer of Greyhound bus stations (born 1898)
