= 1890 in architecture =

The year 1890 in architecture involved some significant events.

== Buildings and structures ==
=== Buildings ===
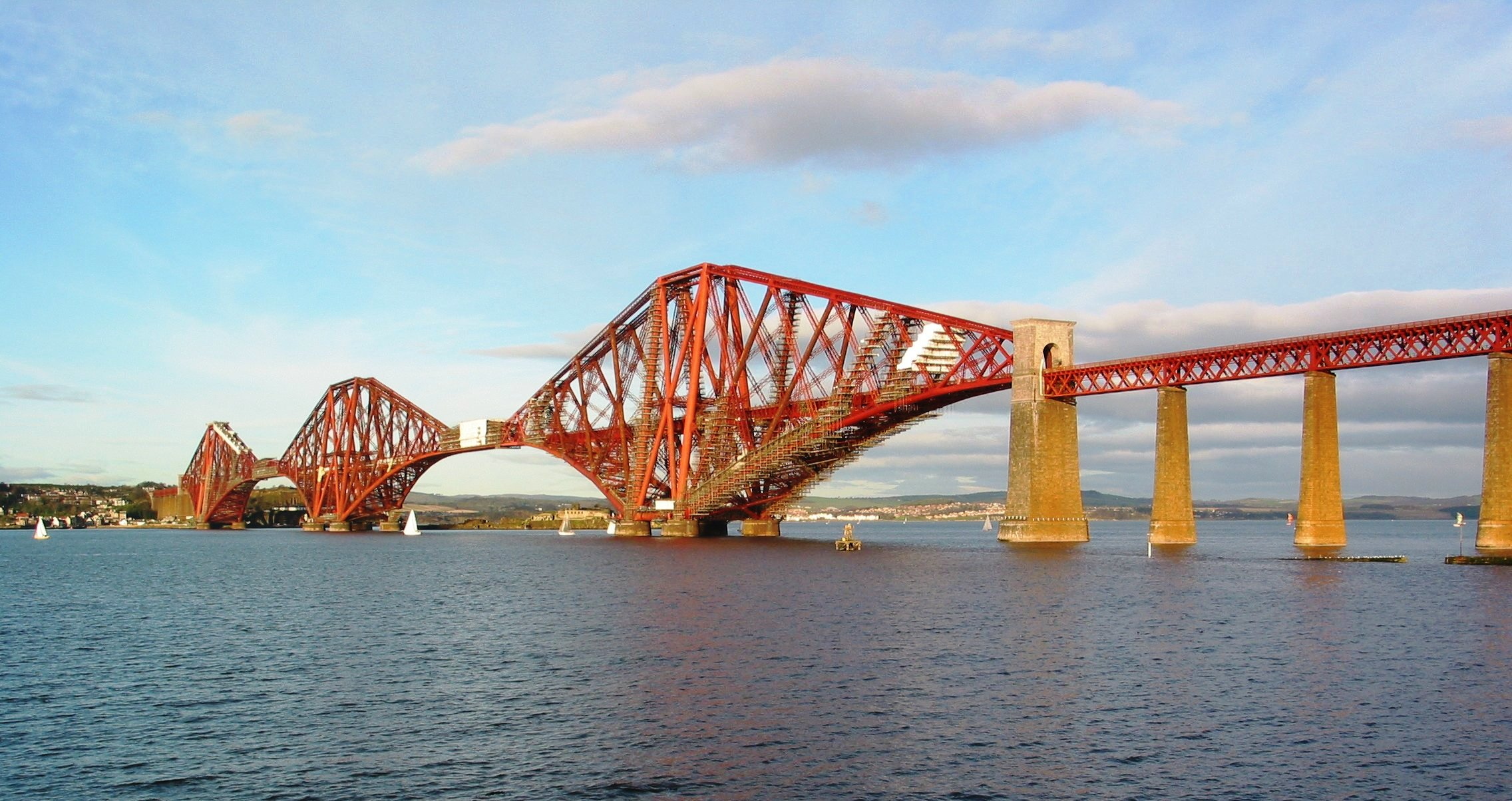
Forth Bridge

- February 3 – Ypsilanti Water Tower, Ypsilanti, Michigan, designed by William R. Coats, is completed.
- March 4 – The Forth Bridge across the Firth of Forth from South Queensferry to North Queensferry in Scotland, designed by Sir John Fowler and Sir Benjamin Baker, is opened.
- May 13 - Parish church of Holy Trinity, Sloane Street, London, designed by J. D. Sedding, is consecrated.
- May 30 – The James A. Garfield Memorial at Lake View Cemetery in Cleveland, Ohio, designed by George W. Keller, is dedicated.
- September 29 – St James's Roman Catholic Church, Spanish Place, Westminster, designed by Edward Goldie, is opened.
- The Arcade in Cleveland, Ohio, designed by John Eisenmann.
- The Demarest Building, a commercial building on Fifth Avenue in New York City, designed by Renwick, Aspinwall & Russell, is completed.
- Edwin Lutyens' first commission, Crooksbury, a country house near Farnham, England, is completed.
- The Second Madison Square Garden, designed by Stanford White, is completed on the site of the first Madison Square Garden.

== Awards ==
- RIBA Royal Gold Medal – John Gibson.
- Grand Prix de Rome, architecture: Emmanuel Pontremoli.

== Births ==
- February 9 – J. J. P. Oud, Dutch architect (died 1963)
- April 17 – Carl Krayl, German architect (died 1947)
- March 20 – Owen Williams, English structural engineer (died 1969)
- May 4 – Ingrid Wallberg, Swedish architect (died 1965)
- July 31 – Louis de Soissons, Canadian-born English architect (died 1962)
- November 23 – El Lissitzky, Russian architect and designer (died 1941)
- Philip Hepworth, English architect (died 1963)

== Deaths ==
- October 20 – Alfred B. Mullett, American architect (born 1834)
