= 1887 in architecture =

The year 1887 in architecture involved some significant architectural events and new buildings.

== Events ==
- Construction work begins on
  - Shrine of Our Lady of the Rosary, Rosario, Argentina.
  - Provinciaal Hof, Bruges, Flanders, designed by Louis Delacenserie and René Buyck.
  - Ponce de León Hotel, St. Augustine, Florida, designed by Carrère and Hastings.

== Buildings and structures ==
=== Buildings opened ===
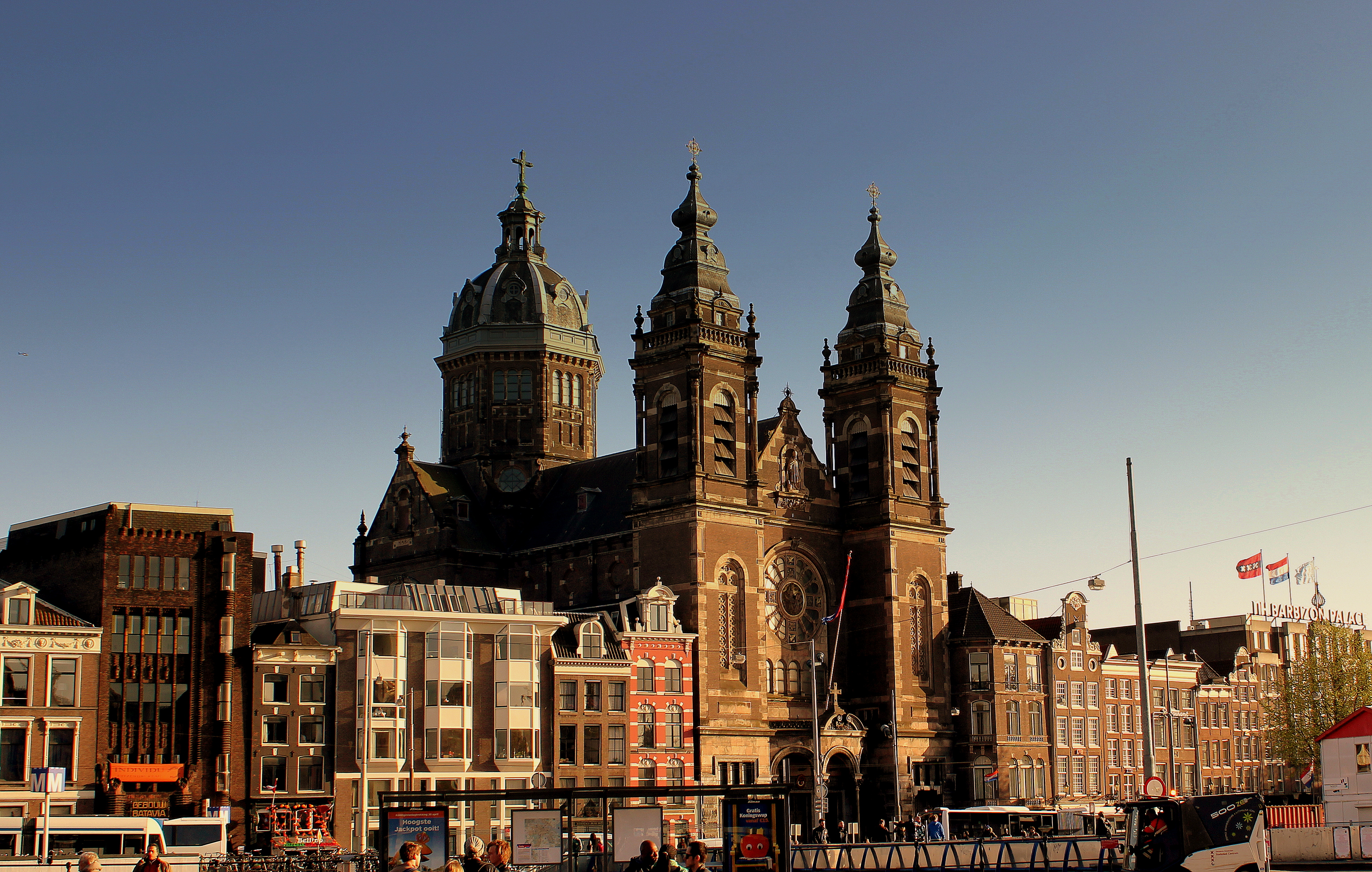
Basilica of St. Nicholas, Amsterdam

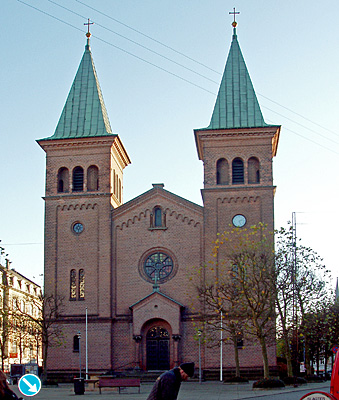
St Paul's Church, Aarhus

- March 29 – Peebles Old Parish Church, Scotland, designed by William Young (dedicated).
- April 23 – Metropolitan Cathedral, Iași, Romania, completed by Alexandru Orăscu (dedicated).
- June 20 – Victoria Terminus of the Great Indian Peninsula Railway in Bombay, designed by Frederick William Stevens.
- December 1 – Raffles Hotel, Singapore.

=== Buildings completed ===
- Cardiff Metropolitan Cathedral, designed by Pugin & Pugin.
- New façade of Florence Cathedral, designed by Emilio De Fabris (died 1883).
- Basilica of St. Nicholas, Amsterdam, designed by Adrianus Bleijs.
- St Paul's Church, Aarhus, designed by Vilhelm Theodor Walther.
- Cluj-Napoca Neolog Synagogue, Romania, designed by engineer Izidor Hegner.
- Eldridge Street Synagogue, New York City, designed by Peter and Francis William Herter.
- Sacred Heart Cathedral, Sarajevo, designed by Josip Vancaš.
- Rebuilt Gare Saint-Lazare terminus of Chemins de fer de l'Ouest in Paris, designed by Juste Lisch.
- Clock tower of Rochdale Town Hall in England, designed by Alfred Waterhouse.

== Awards ==
- RIBA Royal Gold Medal – Ewan Christian.

== Publications ==
- MacGibbon and Ross begin publication of The Castellated and Domestic Architecture of Scotland, from the twelfth to the eighteenth century.
- G. A. Wayss publishes Das System Monier-Eisengerippe mit Cementumhüllung-in seiner Anwendung auf das gesammte Bauwesen in Berlin, one of the first books on reinforced concrete (using Joseph Monier's system).

== Births ==
- March 21 – Erich Mendelsohn, German-Jewish Expressionist architect (died 1953)
- May 10 – Herbert James Rowse, English architect noted for work in Liverpool (died 1963)
- May 31 – Philip Tilden, English domestic architect (died 1956)
- June 15 – Oliver Hill, English architect (died 1968)
- August 30 – Eric Francis, British architect and painter (died 1976)
- October 6 – Le Corbusier (Charles-Édouard Jeanneret), Swiss-French architect, designer, painter, urban planner, writer and pioneer of modern architecture (died 1965)

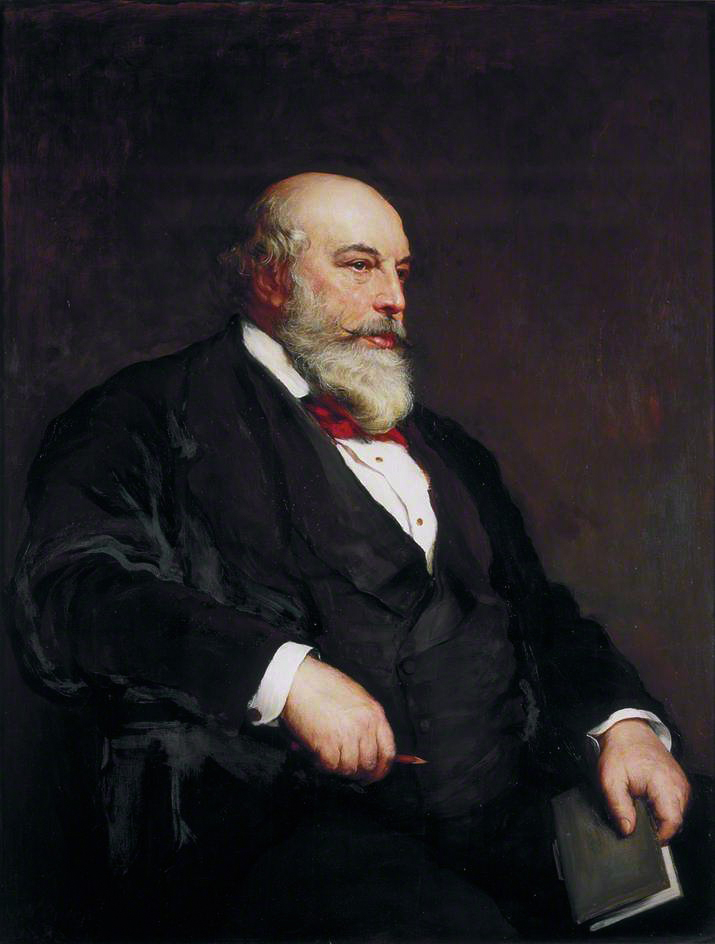
Horace Jones

== Deaths ==
- April 13 – David Stirling, Scottish-born Canadian architect (born 1822)
- May 8 – Thomas Stevenson, Scottish lighthouse engineer (born 1818)
- May 21 – Sir Horace Jones, English architect (born 1819)
- August 16 – Webster Paulson, English civil engineer (born 1837)
