= Filipe Oliveira Dias =

Portuguese architect (1963–2014)

Filipe Oliveira Dias (October 16, 1963 – October 15, 2014) was a Portuguese architect. He had a post-graduate degree from IUCC (Sevilla, SP), and was a professor at the Escola Superior de Artes Aplicadas (ESART), a school of the Polytechnical Institute of Castelo Branco, since 2006. He has been among Portugal's regularly published architects born in the 20th century. His book 15 Years of Public Work was published in November 2004 by Campo das Letras Editorial.

In 2004, he was awarded the Home National Institute Prize.

== Works ==
Filipe Oliveira Dias' emblematic buildings, all in Portugal, include:

- Central Services of Porto Polytechnical Institute, (1994)
- F Building of Porto Institute of Engineering of Porto Polytechnical Institute, (1998)
- Helena Sá e Costa Theatre, in Porto (1999)
- Central Library of Porto Polytechnical Institute, (2000)
- Vila do Conde/Póvoa de Varzim School of Industry and Management of Porto Polytechnical Institute, (2001)
- Porto Drama and Music School of Porto Polytechnical Institute, (2002)
- Felgueiras School of Technology and Management of Porto Polytechnical Institute, (2003)
- Bragança Theatre, (2004)
- Vila Real Theatre (2004)
- Mirandela Swimming Pools, (2004)
- Porto Social Home's - Monte de S. João, (2004) (Prize INH)
