= Nozema Zendstation, The Hague =

Reinforced concrete tower in The Hague, Netherlands

Nozema Zendstation The Hague is a 133-metre-high (436 ft) tower of reinforced concrete at The Hague, Netherlands. It was built in 1965.

== See also ==
- List of towers
