= H. T. Cadbury-Brown =

English architect

- Born: Henry Thomas Cadbury-Brown; 20 May 1913; Sarratt, Hertfordshire, England
- Died: 9 July 2009 (aged 96); Aldeburgh, Suffolk, England
- Education: Architectural Association
- Occupation: Architect
- Awards: President of the Architectural Association; Honorary Doctorate at the Royal College of Art
- Buildings: Royal College of Art; Ashmount School; World's End Housing (collaboration with Eric Lyons)

Henry Thomas Cadbury-Brown RA (20 May 1913 – 9 July 2009), also known as H.T. Cadbury-Brown and Jim Cadbury-Brown, was an English architect. He was educated at the Architecture Association where he was influenced by the architecture of Le Corbusier and Walter Gropius. After graduating he worked for architect Ernő Goldfinger and became his lifelong friend. He went on to set up his own successful practice.

His involvement with the Modern Architecture Research Group (MARS) led to friendships with other modernist architects and opportunities for work including the 1951 Festival of Britain. He may be best known for his design input into the Royal College of Art.

== Education and early work ==
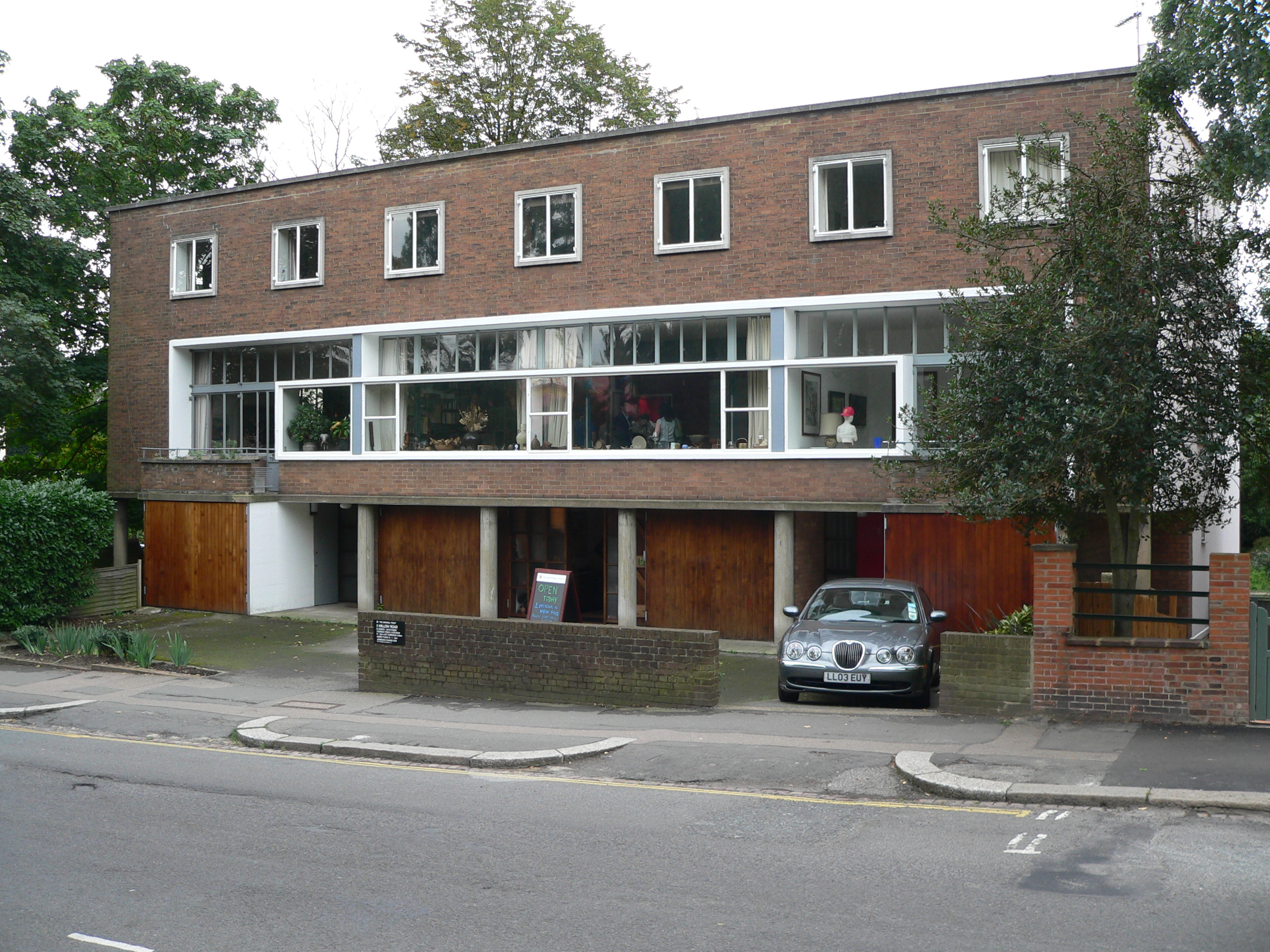
Front view of 1–3 Willow Road

Cadbury-Brown was born in Sarratt in Hertfordshire and boarded at Westminster School. From his childhood he was known as "Jim" after a family friend who had died in the First World War. Although there was family pressure for him to join the Navy, friends suggested architecture as he had shown an aptitude for maths and drawing. At the behest of the architect F. R. Yerbury he enrolled into the Architecture Association in 1930, aged 17. His first design projects were quite traditional, but after his introduction to the work of Le Corbusier by a friend his work became much more modern. The German magazine Moderne Bauformen exposed him to German modernism and the work of Walter Gropius. He respected the simplicity of the German designs and their grounding in realism rather than the intellectualism of other modernists.

In 1934 as a fourth-year student Cadbury-Brown met Ursula and Ernő Goldfinger and was delighted by their furniture and collection of paintings. After graduating he spent a year working at Goldfinger's office and became an admirer of his work and lifelong friend. He learnt first-hand about the composition of materials and detailing and assisted with the design of Goldfinger's Willow Road house.

His first solo project came in 1937 when he won a competition to design two travel centres for the Big Four British railway companies. The buildings, one in Queensway and the other in the Strand (both now demolished), were praised by one of the competition assessors (Charles Holden) for their simplicity and practicality. On the back of this commission Cadbury-Brown set up his own office in Clarges Street, London. In 1938 he designed an exhibition stand at the Design and Industries Association at the British Industries Fair at Olympia.

His friendship with Ralph Tubbs, whom he had met two years earlier upon joining the MARS Group, led to more work. They collaborated with another to design a bandstand in Weymouth for the MARS Group exhibition at the New Burlington Galleries. They went on to share offices and to design a display for the British Pavilion at the 1939 World's Fair.

Like many of the designers at the MARS Group exhibition, Cadbury-Brown would later be chosen by Hugh Casson to help design some of the pavilions at the Festival of Britain. Also through this association with the group, he received work from Frederick Gibberd to design eighty houses in Mark Hall South as part of the Harlow New Town project. In 1947 the sixth meeting of CIAM was hosted by MARS in Bridgwater, Somerset and Cadbury-Brown as secretary had a role in its organisation. MARS at that time was under the leadership of the architectural critic J M Richards who set the theme of the conference to architecture that appealed to the "Common Man". This combination of architecture with sculpture, painting and populism was of great interest to Cadbury-Brown.

When war broke out he was already an officer with the Territorial Army, in which he served as a major with the Royal Artillery. During his service he noted that he it made all the way from Normandy to Germany without firing a shot.

Whilst working on designs for the Festival of Britain, Cadbury-Brown met his wife Elizabeth Romeyn Elwyn, who was born in the United States on 28 March 1922. As a young American architect in London she was advised that it was unlikely that she would find work, but through her friendship with a cousin of Helena Rubinstein she was introduced to Goldfinger, where she worked as an unpaid intern. At that time she was already married to an English constitutional lawyer, Bill Dale, but after an amicable divorce she married Cadbury-Brown in 1953. Elizabeth joined Cadbury-Brown's office where she was able to use her considerable detailing skills.

== Selected projects ==
=== Festival of Britain ===
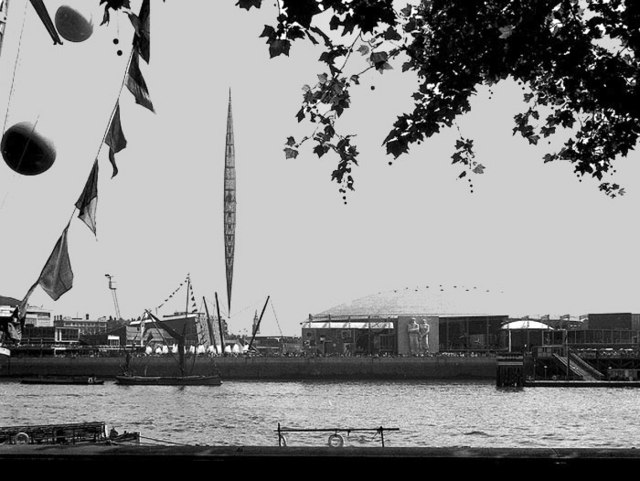
A view of the South Bank Exhibition from the north bank of the Thames, showing the Skylon and the Dome of Discovery

Cadbury-Brown had met Hugh Casson when the latter had been training at the Bartlett School of Architecture. When Casson was appointed Director of Design for the Festival he involved a number of the architects from the 1938 MARS Group exhibition. Cadbury-Brown was asked to design two pavilions (The Land of Britain and The People of Britain), the Turntable Café and a major promenade on the South Bank side of the River Thames called the "Concourse".

The pavilions were laid out either side of a central axis formed by the railway line across the river to Waterloo Station and divided into "Upstream" and "Downstream" zones. "Upstream" pavilions represented "The Land" of Britain and "Downstream" pavilions "The People" of Britain. There was some crossover however of the two zones across the axis. For example, Cadbury-Brown's two pavilions faced one another on the "Upstream" side even though they represented their own respective zones.

The entrance to each of Cadbury-Brown's two pavilions began with conical structures built with coloured sheets of aluminium suspended from cables. The Land of Britain pavilion demonstrated the forging of the land, its geology and climate; whereas the People of Britain pavilion exhibited the diversity of the people who inhabit the country. The People of Britain pavilion was partially constructed under the vaults of the railway viaduct. The visitors' route looped past a pool of water containing a sculpture of Orpheus by Heinz Henghes before ending at a two-storey building containing information about the Romans, Saxons and Iron Age. Cadbury-Brown described this building as Miesian in design with its grid structure and sliding doors.

His design for the main esplanade placed studded lights either side of the concourse with "flame fountains" at the far end.

=== Ashmount School ===
The Ashmount School in Islington was designed as a joint junior and infants school. On a sloping site separate three and two-storey blocks for the juniors and infants respectively are linked by their assembly halls, kitchen and dining rooms. As a function of the sloping site all of the blocks other than the junior block share a common roof.

The school uses an early example of all-glass curtain walling called the Hill System. Rather than use the common opaque, blue spandrel panels on the façade, Cadbury-Brown chose instead to just use glass panels. The corners of the building are glazed whilst the top of the curtain wall at the roof edge is neatly finished without a projecting edge (although the final detail was realised in felt rather than as designed in steel). Although the fireproof cladding for the columns behind make the building frame less visible, the building has been compared to those by Mies van de Rohe. The design has been considered comparable to the Eames House and Hunstanton School by Alison and Peter Smithson.

Although the buildings were locally listed in 1999, they have been under threat of demolition since 2005. With the relocation of the school to new premises in Crouch Hill Community Park, Islington Council prepared a Planning Brief in 2012 for the site's redevelopment. When asked to consider listing the building in 2005, English Heritage acknowledged that whilst the composition of the whole building was interesting it had been compromised by alterations and suffered from poor insulation and ventilation.

=== House in Aldeburgh ===
For many years, the Cadbury-Browns had a holiday home near the Suffolk town of Aldeburgh. Cadbury-Brown had designed a studio for Benjamin Britten in the early days of the Aldeburgh Festival and Britten had acquired a site opposite the parish church to build an opera house upon it. When this idea did not come to fruition, Britten converted the maltings at Snape and Cadbury-Brown bought the site. Seeing that the site already had a single storey dwelling on it he knew that it had potential and together with his wife they designed a new home (3 Church Walk).

After the house was completed in 1964 he sold part of the garden to Britten's colleague, the musician Imogen Holst and designed a house for her too. In 2000 the original house was Grade II listed.

His own home displayed a Japanese design influence which he attributed to Junzo Sakakura's Japanese pavilion at the 1937 Paris Exposition. The structural elements and the inter-relationship of the spaces were two things that he thought were important.

The approach to the house is via a narrow gap between the garage and the garden wall that opens out into a courtyard. The entrance to the house is in the corner of the courtyard and it leads to the main axis of the house at the mid-way point. Due to a restriction on the height of the building the Cadbury Browns introduced a stepped down "pit" off the living room and a platform level in the dining room that gives views out to the garden. Doorways are floor to ceiling, there are no skirtings and angled skylights bring daylight deep into the house where it is needed.

Although the Holst house was built on a smaller budget this is not apparent in the setting of the houses with each house carefully designed in relation to its garden. The importance of the garden in relation to the house architecture may have come from the influence of his former tutor at the Architectural Association, the landscape architect, Geoffrey Jellicoe.

As well as his sketch designs for Britten's opera house, he also designed a memorial for Britten on the beach at Aldeburgh. It would have taken the form of a great timber baulk standing vertical on the beach. The idea was that holes drilled in the timber would play notes from Britten's opera Peter Grimes whenever a storm of sufficient power struck. The design was not realised and Cadbury-Brown was not keen on the actual memorial by Maggi Hambling.

=== Royal College of Art ===
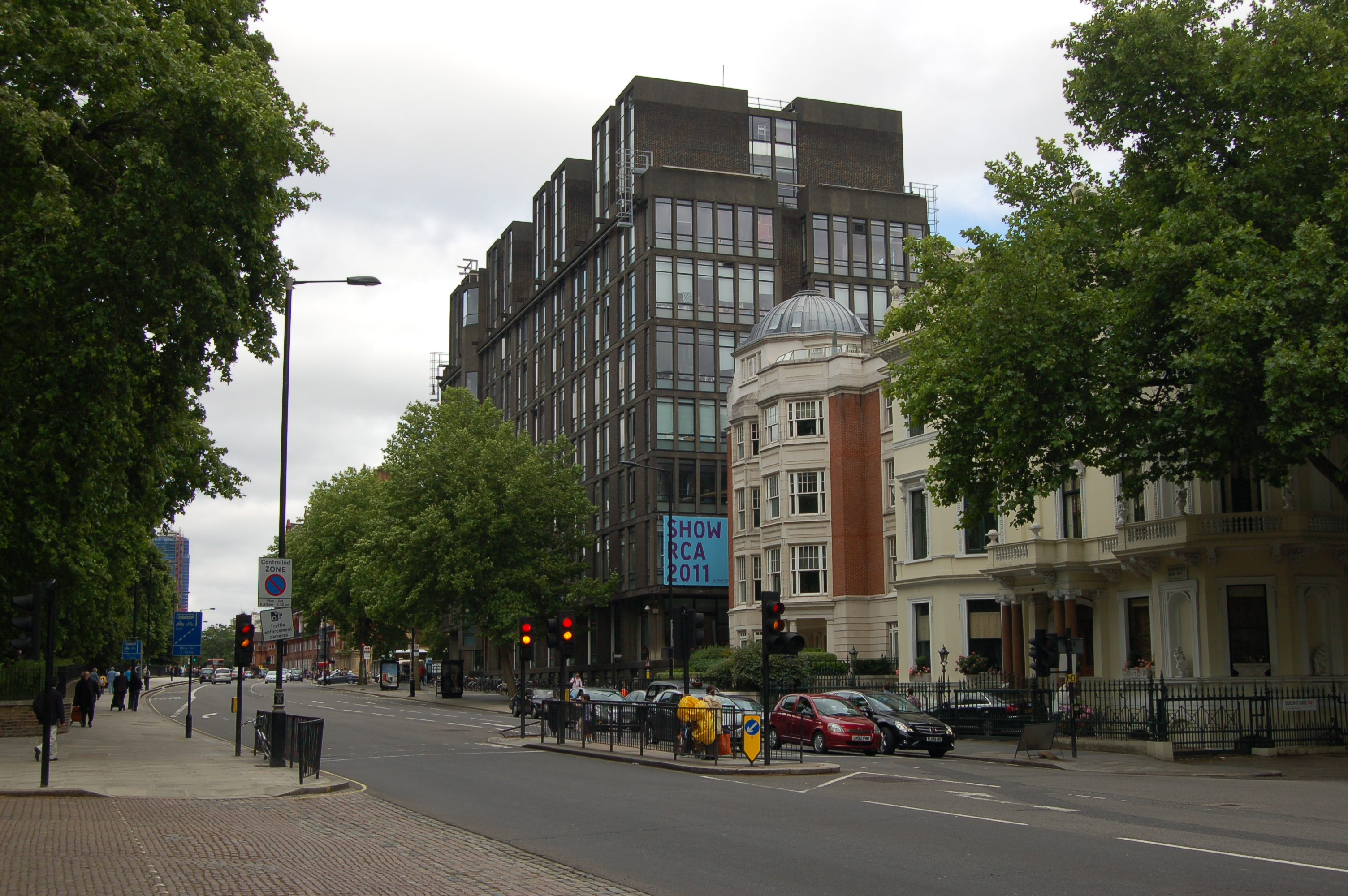
West elevation from Hyde Park

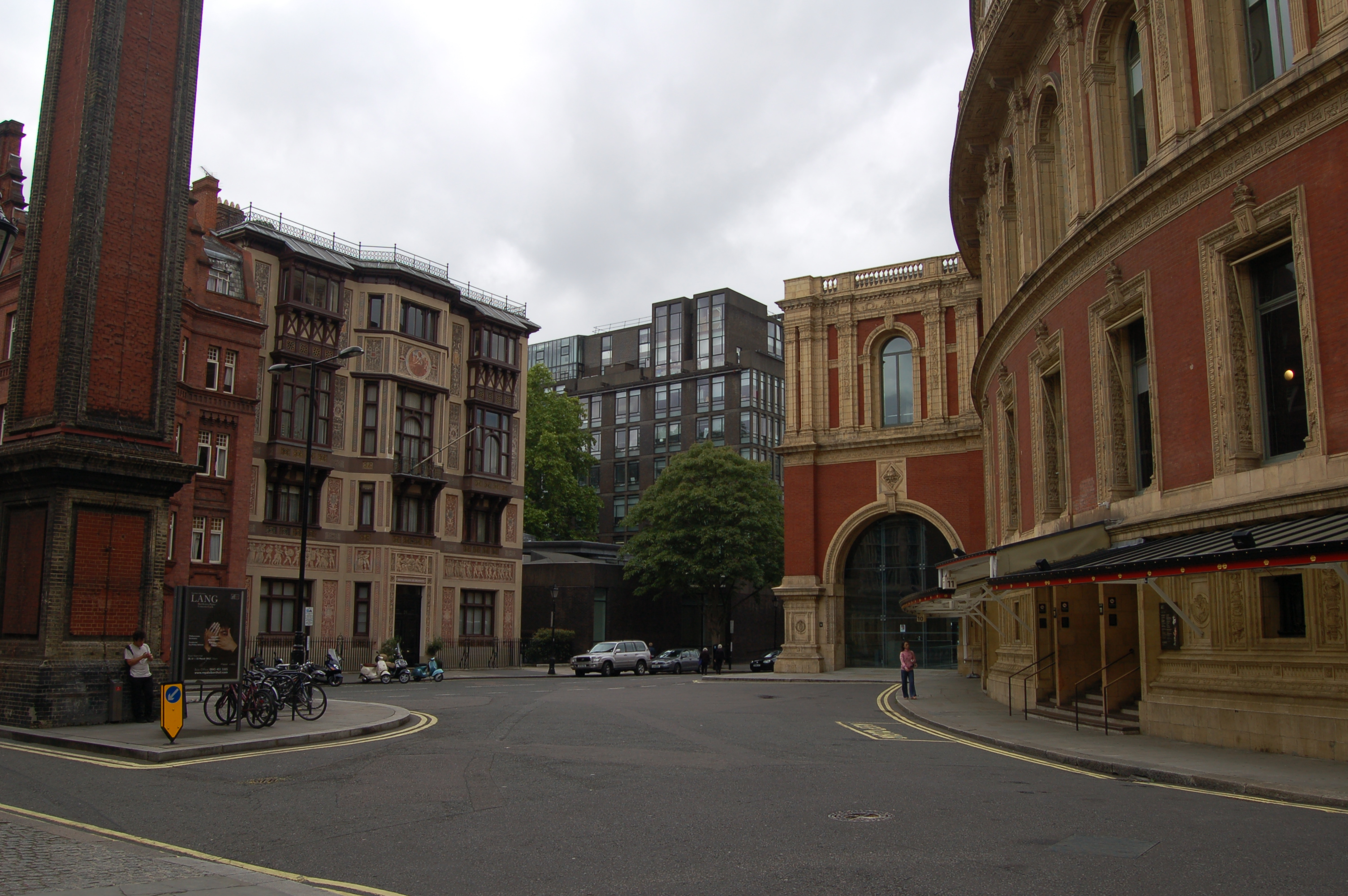
South elevation in context with the Royal Albert Hall on the left and former Royal College of Organists on the left

Head of sculpture at the Royal College of Art, Frank Dobson and his successor, John Skeaping both promoted the interrelationship of sculpture and architecture and this, as well as Cadbury-Brown's work with artists at the Festival of Britain, led him to get a part-time teaching job at the sculpture department. In the mid-1950s Government money became available for both an extension to the workshop for applied arts and for a new building on a site facing Kensington Gardens, adjacent to the Royal Albert Hall. The rector of the college, Robin Darwin decided to keep the design of the building "in-house" and asked the interior design course leader and architect, Hugh Casson for his help. Casson formed a team with two other architects, Cadbury-Brown and head of Silversmithing and Jewellery, Robert Goodden. In the team Casson had responsibility for client liaison, Goodden developed the brief and Cadbury-Brown did the design work and contract administration.

The site for the new building has a long frontage facing Hyde Park on its north side; to the west is Jay Mews; to the east the open space adjacent to the Royal Albert Hall; and the south faces the former Royal College of Organists. The flank of this last building has two sgraffito murals applied in the 1870s. There is a slope across the site of approximately one storey.

Whilst Cadbury-Brown was away teaching at Harvard with J. L. Sert, Wells Coates and Serge Chermayeff, Goodden developed the brief in detail. Upon his return the design started again in earnest. The brief identified rooms which required space with both normal and higher ceiling heights and Cadbury-Brown developed an L-shaped step in section to allow this to be easily accommodated. This design device was similar in principle to one in Göldfinger's Willow Road house between the lower entrance hall and higher studio and dining hall.

The initial design set the supporting columns back from the façade but expressed them externally by recessing some of the storeys. This created horizontal bands on the façade that were aligned with the terracotta ornament on the Albert Hall. The Planning Authority had asked for the entrance the new building to face the Albert Hall to reduce traffic problems on Kensington Gore and this suited Cadbury-Brown as it meant that the College could appropriate this space as an entrance courtyard.

In the final design the stair cores were moved near to the ends of the building to give views out on both the north and south façades. These, in conjunction with double-height galleries added to the top floor created a vertical rhythm to the façade. The number of recessed storeys was reduced to just one on the ground floor which gave the impression that the whole building was supported on the expressed columns. Verticality was further emphasised with the proportions of the windows which were slender and divided by precast concrete mullions. The stair towers have been compared with those of Charles Rennie Mackintosh at the western end of the Glasgow School of Art.

== Art and architecture ==
The combination of art and architecture remained important in Cadbury-Brown's work since the sixth CIAM meeting. At the Festival of Britain he was tasked with designing plinths for a number of sculptures around the festival including Barbara Hepworth and Henry Moore. For Ashmount school he asked one of his students at the Royal College of Art, John Willats to design a sculptural figure of a fighting cock and at housing in Hammersmith he enabled Stephen Sykes to apply decorative tile patterns to the communal stairs.

National Life Stories conducted an oral history interview (C467/16) with Henry Thomas Cadbury-Brown in 1997 for its Architects Lives' collection held by the British Library.

== List of selected projects ==
- 1937: British Railways Office, Bayswater
- 1939: British Railways Office, 170 Strand
- 1951: Land of Britain, People of Britain, Turntable Café, Concourse Layout and fountains
- 1952: Cook's Spinney Housing, Spinney Primary School and Harlow New Town
- 1955: Ashmount School, Hornsey Lane, Islington
- 1958: Studio for Benjamin Britten, The Red House, Aldeburgh
- 1967–1976: World's End housing, Chelsea with Eric Lyons
- 1990: Royal Academy Print Room
