= The Classical Language of Architecture =

1965 book of lectures by John Summerson

- Author: John Summerson
- Subject: Architecture
- Publication date: 1965
- ISBN: 0500201773

The Classical Language of Architecture is a 1965 compilation of six BBC radio lectures given in 1963 by John Summerson. It is a 60-some page discussion of the origins of classical architecture and its movement through Antiquity, Renaissance, Mannerist, Baroque, Neoclassical, and Georgian periods. A discussion of the rules and elements in classical terms of the Orders, architectural harmony of design, are included. For the original radio broadcasts the BBC published a booklet with 60 photographs of the buildings discussed, which were expanded in the book editions.

The metaphor of using "language" to refer to particular design patterns follows a trend in aesthetics.
