= Elizabeth Cadbury-Brown =

American architect

- Born: Elizabeth Romeyn Elwyn; 28 March 1922; Manhattan
- Died: 17 March 2002 (aged 79)
- Education: Columbia University
- Occupation: Architect
- Spouses: Bill Dale; H. T. Cadbury-Brown
- Practice: Ernő Goldfinger; H. T. Cadbury-Brown

Elizabeth Cadbury-Brown (born Elizabeth Romeyn Elwyn; 28 March 1922 – 17 March 2002) was an American-born British architect. She moved to London in 1948 and from then on worked mostly with H. T. Cadbury-Brown, her husband and professional partner.

== Early life ==
Elizabeth Elwyn was born in 1922 in Manhattan, New York. Her father, Adolf Elwyn, was a neuro-anatomy professor at Columbia University, and her mother was a social and environmental activist. She was raised in Croton-on-Hudson, New York, and attended Hessian Hills School. She studied English briefly at Columbia but transferred to a degree in architecture after a year.

== Career ==
Cadbury-Brown worked in a New York practice until 1948, when she decided to visit Europe. While in London she met Bill Dale, a lawyer whom she would later marry, and decided to stay and work there. Although she was told by the Royal Institute of British Architects that she would have difficulty finding work in London as an American with little experience, she found an unpaid position at the practice of Ernő Goldfinger. She began working for H. T. Cadbury-Brown in 1949, assisting him on plans for the Festival of Britain which would be held in 1951. They married and later went into practice together.

Together, the Cadbury-Browns collaborated on a number of projects. At the new buildings for the Royal College of Art in Kensington Gore, London, designed by H. T. Cadbury-Brown with Hugh Casson and Robert Goodden and built between 1960 and 1963, Elizabeth was assistant architect for Gulbenkian Hall, where her influence is clearly visible. The couple also worked together on Gravesend Civic Centre in Gravesend; on a controversial council housing project at World's End, Chelsea, from 1963; on the hexagonal lecture theatres for the University of Essex in 1965–1967; on the library and print room of the Royal Academy of Arts in Burlington House on Piccadilly from 1985 to 1987; and on the Cadbury-Browns' own home in Aldeburgh, Suffolk.

National Life Stories conducted an oral history interview (C467/55) with Betty Cardbury-Brown in 1998 for its Architects Lives' collection held by the British Library.

== Personal life ==
Cadbury-Brown married English lawyer William Dale in 1949. She divorced Dale and remarried H. T. Cadbury-Brown in 1953. Her first marriage ended amicably and she remained close friends with Dale. She died in Aldeburgh in 2002.
