= John Summerson =

British architectural historian (1904–1992)

Sir John Summerson CH CBE FBA FSA
- Born: John Newenham Summerson; 25 November 1904; Barnstead, Darlington, England
- Died: 10 November 1992 (aged 87)
- Known for: Architectural historian

Academic background
- Education: Harrow School and Bartlett School of Architecture, University College London

Sir John Newenham Summerson CH CBE FBA FSA (25 November 1904 – 10 November 1992) was one of the leading British architectural historians of the 20th century.

== Early life ==
John Summerson was born at Barnstead, Coniscliffe Road, Darlington. His grandfather worked for the Darlington and Stockton Railway and founded the family foundry of Thomas Summerson and Sons in Darlington in 1869. After the premature death of his father, Samuel James Summerson, in 1907, Summerson travelled extensively in England and Europe with his mother Dorothea and then attended a prep school at Riber Castle in Derbyshire, (Note: Summerson enjoyed his time at the school and the castle itself provoked an early interest in architecture, and a life-long distaste for the Gothic Revival. He described Riber as "an object of indecipherable bastardy – a true monster".) before going to Harrow (1918–1922) and the Bartlett School of Architecture at University College London, where he gained a bachelor's degree.

== Career ==
After graduation, Summerson worked in several junior roles, most notably in the office of Sir Giles Gilbert Scott, but architectural practice was not for him and he became a tutor at the Edinburgh College of Art, School of Architecture in 1929. Hired by the Modern Architectural Research Group (MARS), a think tank founded by a group of modernist architects, he settled back in London, moving on to a job as an assistant editor for the magazine Architect and Building News in 1934. Following the unsuccessful attempts to become a practising architect, and greater success as an architectural journalist, Summerson embarked on his first book, a biography of the architect John Nash (1752–1835). Published in 1935, it was "outstandingly successful".

He continued to write mainly about British architecture, especially that of the Georgian era. His Architecture in Britain: 1530–1830 (1st edition 1953; many subsequent editions) remained a standard work on the subject for students and general readers after his death. The Classical Language of Architecture (1963) is an introduction to the stylistic elements of classical architecture and traces their use and variation in different eras. He also wrote many more specialised works, including books about Inigo Jones and Georgian London (1945) illustrated by Alison Sleigh, as well as The Architecture of the Eighteenth Century (1986), in which he describes Boullée in a distinct positive manner, stating that Boullée was clearly the point of departure for one of the boldest innovators of the century, Claude Nicolas Ledoux. His 1945 book Georgian London was called "a masterpiece of British art history" by Simon Jenkins in a Sunday Times review of the 1988 edition.

One of the founders of the National Buildings Record (NBR) in 1941, Summerson served as its deputy director yet also took to the streets taking photographs for the organisation. He was also a Commissioner of the Royal Commission on the Historical Monuments of England (RCHME) for 21 years from 1953 to 1974, writing the introduction to the book celebrating the NBR's fiftieth anniversary in 1991. He sat on many other public bodies and committees, including the Royal Fine Arts Commission (1947–54) and the Historic Buildings Council (1953–78) and was an early and active member of The Georgian Group that was founded in 1937.

In 1945, Summerson was appointed Director and curator of Sir John Soane's Museum, a post he held until his retirement in 1984.

He was Slade Professor of Fine Art at the University of Oxford for 1958–59 and Slade Professor at Cambridge University for the 1966–7 academic year. He gave the 1964 Master-Mind Lecture on Inigo Jones. Summerson lectured at The Courtauld Institute of Art on the history of Georgian architecture in London, Birkbeck, University of London, and the Architectural Association and became a good friend of his student Roger Westman, who himself went on to become a noted architect.

Summerson was noted for his somewhat elitist approach, and he was not always a consistent friend of the conservation movement. He was hired by the ESB in Ireland to speak in favour of their demolition of 16 Georgian townhouses in Fitzwilliam Street, Dublin. The doomed terrace, he said, was "simply one damned house after another".

== Honours ==
Summerson was knighted in 1958; was awarded the Royal Gold Medal of the Royal Institute of British Architects in 1976; and was created a Member of the Order of the Companions of Honour in 1987. He was a Fellow of the Society of Antiquaries of London and elected a Fellow of the British Academy in 1954.

== Legacy ==
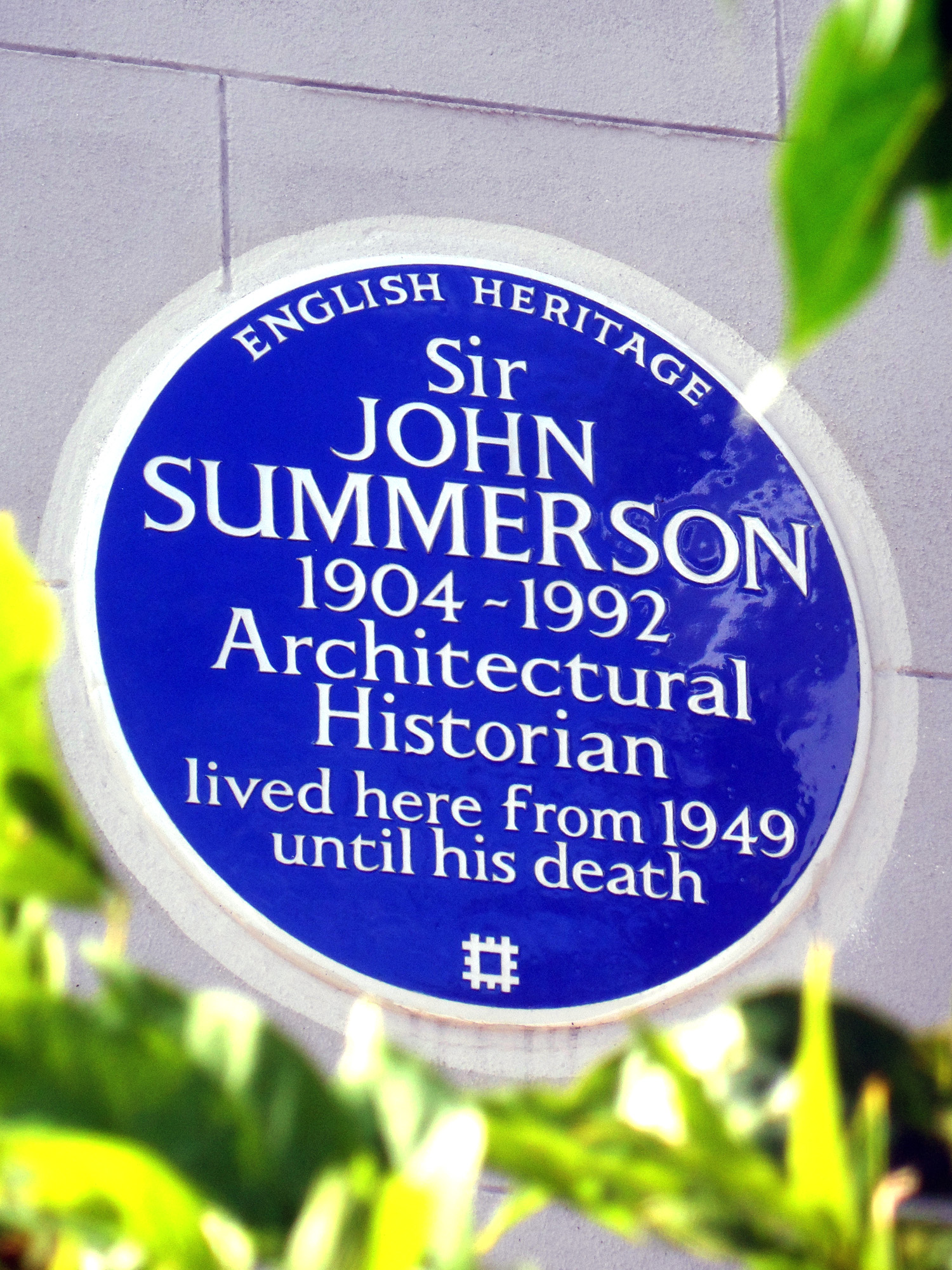
English Heritage blue plaque at 1 Eton Villas, Chalk Farm

The term Bristol Byzantine, referring to a style influenced by Byzantine and Moorish architecture and applied mainly to warehouses, factories, and other industrial buildings in the city of Bristol, is thought to have been invented by Summerson. He invented the term "prodigy house" for showy Elizabethan and Jacobean courtier houses. He had many notable students, including Phoebe Stanton.

There are a number of portraits of Summerson in the collection of the National Portrait Gallery, London; one in oils by the artist Leonard Rosoman and the others by the photographers, Walter Stoneman, Walter Bird, Barry Beattie, and Stephen Hyde.

Photographs attributed to Summerson are held in the Conway Library whose archive, of primarily architectural images, is being digitised under the wider Courtauld Connects project.

In March 2012, an English Heritage blue plaque commemorating Summerson was erected at his former residence in Chalk Farm, London, where he lived with his wife Elizabeth Hepworth, the sister of Dame Barbara Hepworth, the sculptor, and his three sons.

== Sources ==
- Casey, Christine (2005). Dublin. Buildings of Ireland. New Haven and London: Yale University Press. ISBN 978-0-300-10923-8.
- Girouard, Mark (2009) [2004]. "Summerson, Sir John Newenham (1904–1992)". Oxford Dictionary of National Biography (online ed.). Oxford University Press. doi:10.1093/ref:odnb/47466. (Subscription, Wikipedia Library access or UK public library membership required.)
- Hartwell, Claire; Pevsner, Nikolaus; Williamson, Elizabeth (2016). Derbyshire. The Buildings of England. New Haven and London: Yale University Press. ISBN 978-0-300-21559-5. OCLC 995068002.
