= Ingrid Wallberg =

Swedish architect

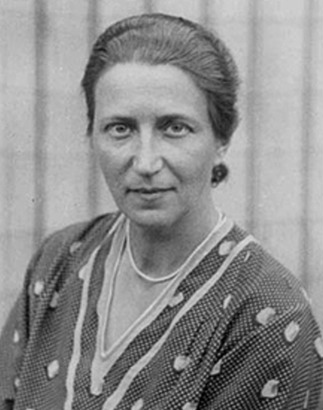
- Ingrid Wallberg around 1936
- Born: 4 May 1890; Halmstad, Sweden
- Died: 23 January 1965 (aged 74); Örgryte, Sweden
- Occupation: Architect
- Spouse: Albert Lilienberg
- Parents: Alfred Wilhelm Wallberg; Charlotta Benedikta
- Relatives: Olof Wallberg (brother)

Ingrid Wallberg (4 May 1890 – 23 January 1965) was a Swedish architect. Known for her functionalist designs, she became the first female architect in Sweden with her own firm.

== Life ==
Ingrid Wallberg was born on 4 May 1890 to an affluent family in Halmstad, Sweden, where her family owned the textile and brick industries Wallbergs Fabriks AB and Slottsmöllans tegelbruk. Her father Alfred Wallberg was the managing director of Wallbergs Fabriks AB. Wallberg spent much of her childhood at Villa Ekebo in Halmstad and attended the Djursholm school. In 1908, she fell ill with an ocular disorder and went to Berlin to live with one of her sisters. While in Berlin, she undertook an urban construction programme the following year. In 1915, she studied architecture at the Königliche Kunstgewerbeschule and simultaneously had private tutoring in constructional drawing and perspective drawing.

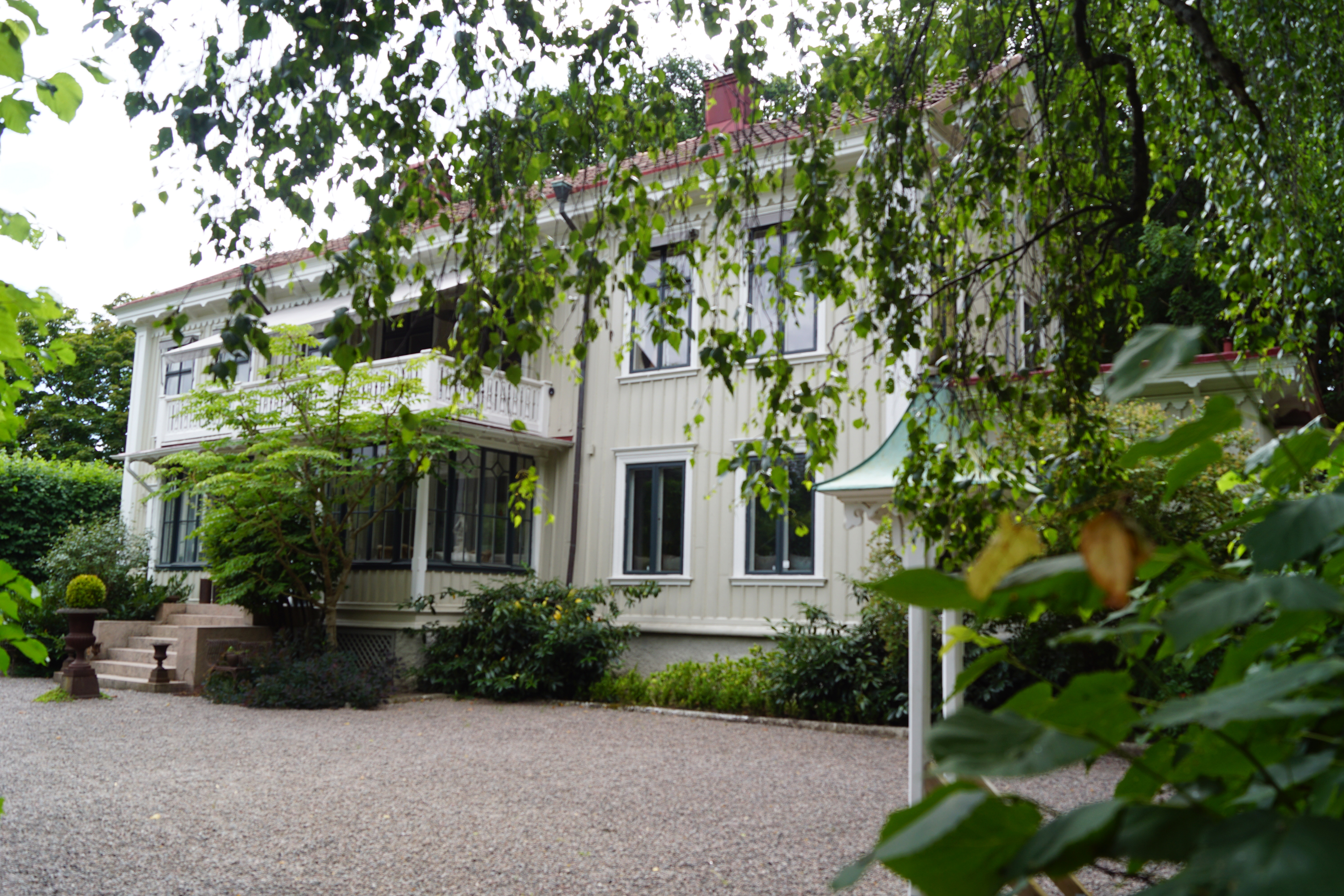
Stora Gårda mansion in Örgryte where Wallberg lived from 1909 until her death in 1965.

At the age of 17, Wallberg met the architect Albert Lilienberg. They married in 1909. Also in that year, Lilienberg became first city planning engineer of Gothenburg, and the couple moved to Stora Gårda, where their son Björn was born in 1917. During this time, Wallberg served as an assistant to her husband and together they entered several urban-planning competitions including one in Chicago, where they attained the third position. In 1923, Wallberg entered the Gothenburg Exhibition, where she closely worked with the Förening Hus och Hema and presented on the city's housing. Amidst an unhappy marriage, Wallberg developed an interest in reading books on town-planning and philosophy. She was also fond of German, English, and French fiction.

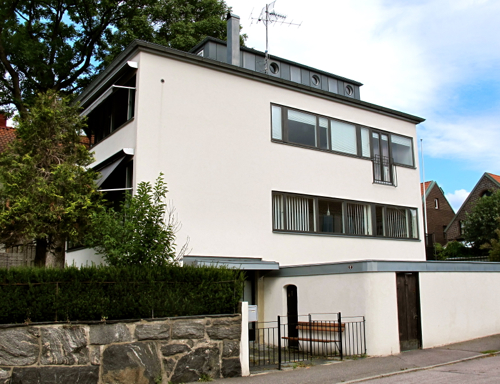
Villa in Prytzgatan, Örgryte, designed by Wallberg and Alfred Roth

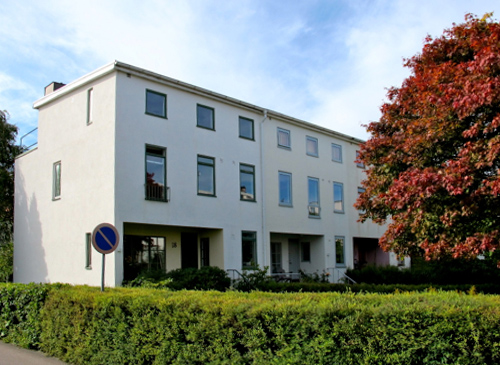
Terrace houses in Brödragatan in Örgryte in Göteborg

Wallberg and her husband divorced in January 1927. Following the divorce, Wallberg went to live with her sister Lotti, who had moved to Paris to marry Albert Jeanneret. Jeanneret was the brother of the Swiss architectural giant Le Corbusier. From the beginning of 1928, Wallberg practised on her own at the Le Corbusier's studio. During this time, she turned her attention to functionalism and received training from Alfred Roth, an architect at Le Corbusier. She returned to Sweden in 1928. With the help of Roth, she set up the architectural firm R & W in Gothenburg. Together they designed new apartment buildings and terraced houses, altered detached houses, and built factory buildings in the functionalist style. Part of Wallberg's earliest work, the house of master tailor Simonsson's house used rocks; this was widely admired across the nation.

In 1929, Wallberg married chief town doctor Gösta Göthlin. Upon the death of her father in 1930, she moved back to Halmstad and began to devote herself more to her family business. She became a member of the board of Wallbergs Fabriks AB, and eventually its chairman between 1955 and 1965.

In her hometown, Wallberg designed most of the industrial buildings and townhouses. Wallberg died in Örgryte, on 23 January 1965.
